= List of Chicago White Sox broadcasters =

== Radio ==
=== Stations ===
==== Shared rights (pre-1944) ====
In 1943 and earlier, several stations broadcast the White Sox simultaneously. The team allowed as many stations as desired to air their games, although probably not all stations aired all games, especially road games. For example, in 1931, Sox games aired on WIBO, WMAQ, WGN, WENR, and WCFL. Announcers for stations other than WGN and WMAQ are unknown.

Exclusive radio rights weren't awarded by the Sox until 1944.

- WMAQ 670 kHz (1926–1934)
  - Hal Totten (1926–1934)
- WGN 720 kHz (1927–1943)
  - Quin Ryan (1927–1930)
  - Bob Elson (1931–1937)
  - Bob Elson, Jim Fleming (1938)
  - Bob Elson (1939–1941)
  - Bob Elson, Jack Brickhouse (1942)
  - Jack Brickhouse (1943)
- WCFL 970 kHz (1931–1932, 1935–1940)
  - John O'Hara (1931)
  - Bob Hawk (1932)
  - Hal Totten (1935–1940)
- WIBO 560 kHz (1931–1932)
  - Norman Ross, Bob Hawk (1931)
  - Norman Ross (1932)
- WENR 870 kHz (1931)
  - Tris Speaker (1931)
- WBBM 770 kHz (1931–1940)
  - Pat Flanagan (1931–1935)
  - Pat Flanagan, John Harrington (1936)
  - Pat Flanagan, George Sutherland (1937)
  - Pat Flanagan, Val Sherman, Charlie Grimm (1938)
  - Pat Flanagan, John Harrington (1939)
  - Pat Flanagan (1940)
- WJJD 1130 kHz (1930–1931, 1937–1940)
  - Red Grange (1930)
  - Rocky Wolfe (1931)
  - John Harrington (1937–1938)
  - Lew Fonseca, Charlie Grimm (1939–1940)
- WJKS 1360 kHz (1932–1933)
  - John O'Hara (1932–1933)
- WIND 560 kHz (1934–1938)
  - John O'Hara (1934)
  - Russ Hodges (1935–1937)
  - Russ Hodges, Jimmy Dudley (1938)
- WCFL 1000 kHz (1941–1943)
  - Hal Totten (1941)
  - Hal Totten, Jimmy Dudley (1942)
  - Hal Totten (1943)
- WJJD 1160 kHz (1941–1943)
  - Pat Flanagan (1941–43)

Station frequencies and call letters are accurate for the years of their White Sox broadcasts.

Due to the North American Regional Broadcasting Agreement that took effect on March 29, 1941, WBBM moved from 770 to 780 kHz, WENR/WLS moved from 870 to 890, WCFL moved from 970 to 1000 and WJJD moved from 1130 to 1160. Most American and Canadian stations above 730 kHz changed frequencies on this date.

==== Exclusive rights (since 1944) ====
- 1944: WIND 560 kHz
  - Walt Lochman
- 1945–1947: WJJD 1160 kHz (day), WIND 560 kHz (night)
  - Jack Brickhouse (1945)
  - Bob Elson (1946–47)
- 1948–1949: WJJD 1160 kHz (day), WFMF 100.3 MHz (night)
  - Bob Elson
- 1950: WJJD 1160 kHz (day), WBIK 96.3 (night)
  - Bob Elson
- 1951: WJJD 1160 kHz (day), WCFL 1000 kHz (night)
  - Bob Elson
- 1952–1966: WCFL 1000 kHz
  - Bob Elson, Dick Bingham (1952)
  - Bob Elson, Don M. Wells (1953–1960)
  - Bob Elson, Ralph Kiner (1961)
  - Bob Elson, Milo Hamilton (1962–1965)
  - Bob Elson, Bob Finnegan (1966)
- 1967–1970: WMAQ 670 kHz
  - Bob Elson, Red Rush, Jay Scott
- 1971–1972: WTAQ 1300/WEAW-FM 105.1 MHz/WJOL-FM 96.7 MHz
  - Harry Caray, Ralph Faucher, Jay Scott
- 1973–1979: WMAQ 670 kHz
  - Harry Caray, Gene Osborn, Jay Scott (1973)
  - Harry Caray, Bill Mercer , Jay Scott (1974–75)
  - Harry Caray, Lorn Brown (1976)
  - Harry Caray, Lorn Brown, Jimmy Piersall, Mary Shane (1977)
  - Harry Caray, Lorn Brown, Jimmy Piersall (1978–79)
- 1980–1981: WBBM 780 kHz
  - Harry Caray, Jimmy Piersall, Joe McConnell, Rich King (1980)
  - Harry Caray, Joe McConnell, Rich King (1981)
- 1982–1995: WMAQ 670 kHz
  - Joe McConnell, Early Wynn (1982)
  - Joe McConnell, Lorn Brown, Early Wynn (1983)
  - Joe McConnell, Lorn Brown (1984)
  - Lorn Brown, Del Crandall (1985–1988)
  - John Rooney, Wayne Hagin (1989–1991)
  - John Rooney, Ed Farmer (1992–1995)
- 1996–2005: WMVP 1000 kHz
  - John Rooney, Ed Farmer
- 2006–2015: WSCR 670 kHz
  - Ed Farmer, Chris Singleton (2006–2007)
  - Ed Farmer, Steve Stone (2008)
  - Ed Farmer, Darrin Jackson (2009–2015)
- 2016–2017: WLS 890 kHz
  - Ed Farmer, Darrin Jackson (2016)
  - Ed Farmer, Jason Benetti, Darrin Jackson (2017)
- 2018–2020: WGN 720 kHz
  - Ed Farmer, Jason Benetti, Darrin Jackson (2018)
  - Ed Farmer, Darrin Jackson (2019)
  - Andy Masur, Darrin Jackson (2020)
- 2021–present: WMVP 1000 kHz, HD Radio simulcast on WTBC-FM-HD2 100.3-2 MHz
  - Len Kasper, Connor McKnight, Darrin Jackson (2021)
  - Len Kasper, Connor McKnight, Jason Benetti, Darrin Jackson (2022–2023)

On January 18, 2018, WLS owner Cumulus announced that they are exercising their opt-out clause and voiding its contract with the White Sox, due to the company's current bankruptcy proceedings. Less than a month later, on February 14, the White Sox and WGN Radio signed a multiyear agreement.

WJJD was a daytime-only station the years they had the White Sox radio rights. Night games were carried on WIND, WFMF, WBKI, and WCFL as listed above.

Station frequencies and call letters are accurate for the years of their White Sox broadcasts.

== Television ==
=== Stations (broadcast) ===
- WGN-TV Ch. 9 (1948–67)
  - Jack Brickhouse, Harry Creighton (1948–54)
  - Jack Brickhouse, Harry Creighton, Vince Lloyd (1955)
  - Jack Brickhouse, Vince Lloyd (1956–64)
  - Jack Brickhouse, Lloyd Pettit (1965–67)
- WFLD Ch. 32 (1968–72)
  - Jack Drees, Dave Martin (1968)
  - Jack Drees, Mel Parnell (1969)
  - Jack Drees, Billy Pierce (1970)
  - Jack Drees, Bud Kelly (1971–72)
- WSNS-TV Ch. 44 (1973–80)
  - Harry Caray, Bob Waller (1973–74)
  - Harry Caray, J.C. Martin (1975)
  - Harry Caray, Lorn Brown (1976)
  - Harry Caray, Lorn Brown, Jimmy Piersall, Mary Shane (1977)
  - Harry Caray, Lorn Brown, Jimmy Piersall (1978–79)
  - Harry Caray, Jimmy Piersall, Joe McConnell (1980)
- WGN-TV Ch. 9 (1981)
  - Harry Caray, Jimmy Piersall, Joe McConnell, Lou Brock (1981)
- WFLD Ch. 32 (1982–89)
  - Don Drysdale, Ken Harrelson (1982–85)
  - Don Drysdale, Frank Messer (1986–87)
  - John Rooney, Tom Paciorek (1988)
  - Gary Thorne, Tom Paciorek (1989)
- WGN-TV Ch. 9 (1990–2019)
  - Jim Durham, Tom Paciorek (1990)
  - Ken Harrelson, Tom Paciorek (1991–99)
  - Ken Harrelson, Darrin Jackson (2000–08)
  - Ken Harrelson, Steve Stone (2009–15)
  - Jason Benetti (home games only), Ken Harrelson or Chuck Swirsky (road games only), Steve Stone (2016–19)
- WCIU-TV Ch. 26 (2000–14)
  - Ken Harrelson, Darrin Jackson (2000–08)
  - Ken Harrelson, Steve Stone (2009–14)
- WPWR-TV Ch. 50 (2015–16)
  - Ken Harrelson, Steve Stone (2015)
  - Jason Benetti (home games only), Ken Harrelson or Chuck Swirsky (road games only), Steve Stone (2016)

=== Stations (cable/pay-TV) ===
- SportsVision/WPWR-TV/WBBS-TV Ch. 60 (1982–83)
  - Don Drysdale, Ken Harrelson, Joe McConnell, Early Wynn
- SportsVision/ONTV/WSNS-TV Ch. 44 (1984)
  - Don Drysdale, Ken Harrelson
- SportsVision (1985–1988)
  - Don Drysdale, Ken Harrelson (1985)
  - Don Drysdale, Frank Messer (1986–87)
  - John Rooney, Tom Paciorek (1988)
- SportsChannel Chicago (1989–97)
  - Gary Thorne, Tom Paciorek (1989)
  - Ken Harrelson, Tom Paciorek (1990–97)
- FSN Chicago (1998–2004)
  - Ken Harrelson, Tom Paciorek (1998–99)
  - Ken Harrelson, Darrin Jackson (2000–04)
- NBC Sports Chicago (2005–24)
  - Ken Harrelson, Darrin Jackson (2005–08)
  - Ken Harrelson, Steve Stone (2009–15)
  - Jason Benetti (home games only), Ken Harrelson or Chuck Swirsky (road games only), Steve Stone (2016–18)
  - Jason Benetti or Chuck Swirsky (select games), Steve Stone (2019–20)
  - Jason Benetti, Mike Monaco, or Len Kasper (select games), Steve Stone (2021)
  - Jason Benetti, Connor McKnight, Adam Amin, or Len Kasper (select games), Steve Stone (2022–23)
  - John Schriffen, Connor McKnight, or Len Kasper (select games), Steve Stone (2024)
- Chicago Sports Network (2025–present)
  - John Schriffen, Connor McKnight, Steve Stone, Dan Plesac, Gordon Beckham, Brooke Fletcher, Darrin Jackson

WBBS-TV and WPWR-TV shared Channel 60 and carried SportsVision programming in 1982 and 1983. In 1984, SportsVision programming was carried by ON-TV on WSNS-TV Ch. 44. All broadcasts were scrambled. SportsVision became a cable and satellite station in 1985 when ON-TV ceased operations. It changed its name to SportsChannel Chicago in 1989 and Fox Sports Net Chicago in 1998.

== See also ==
- List of current Major League Baseball announcers
- List of Chicago Bears broadcasters
- List of Chicago Blackhawks broadcasters
- List of Chicago Bulls broadcasters
- List of Chicago Cubs broadcasters
