= List of Chicago Cubs broadcasters =

The following is a list of Chicago Cubs broadcasters:

Names in bold are recipients of the Ford C. Frick Award, presented annually by the National Baseball Hall of Fame to a broadcaster for major contributions to baseball.

== 1920s-1940s ==
- Hal Totten (1924–44)
- Quin Ryan (1926–30)
- Pat Flanagan (1929–43)
- Red Grange (1930–31)
- **Bob Elson** (1931–42)
- John O'Hara (1931–33)
- Norman Ross (1931–32)
- Tris Speaker (1931)
- Rocky Wolfe (1931)
- Bob Hawk (1931–32)
- Ronald Reagan (1933–36)
- **Russ Hodges** (1935–38)
- John Harrington (1936–39)
- Jim Fleming (1938)
- Val Sherman (1938)
- **Jimmy Dudley** (1938–41)
- Jack Drees (1938)
- Charlie Grimm (1938–42; 1960)
- Lew Fonseca (1939–40)
- **Jack Brickhouse** (1942–44; 1947–81) "Hey-hey!" "Weeeeee!"
- Bert Wilson (1944–55) "I don't care who wins, as long as it's the Cubs!"
- Wayne Osborne (1945)
- Joe Wilson (1946–52)
- Bill Brundige (1949)
- Rogers Hornsby (1949)
- Harry Creighton (1949–56)

== 1950s-1970s ==
- Bud Campbell (1950–53)
- Gene Elston (1954)
- Vince Lloyd (1954–86) "Holy mackerel!"
- **Milo Hamilton** (1955–57; 1980–84) "Holy Toledo!!"
- Jack Quinlan (1956–64)
- Lou Boudreau (1958–59; 1961–87) "Kiss it goodbye!"
- Lloyd Pettit (1963; 1965–1966; 1969–1970)
- Jim West (1971-1976)

== 1980s-1990s ==
- **Harry Caray** (1982–97) "It might be... it could be... it is!" "Holy cow!" "Cubs win!"
  - In 1987, Caray suffered a stroke during the offseason leading to his absence from the broadcast booth for most of the first two months of the season. To fill the void, a series of celebrity guest announcers appeared on the WGN telecasts in his place.
- Steve Stone (1983–2000; 2003–2004)
- Dan Roan (1984–2019); substitute broadcaster and host of certain specials; WGN only
- Dewayne Staats (1985–89)
- Jim Frey (1987)
- Dave Nelson (1988–89)
- Ron Santo (1990–2010) "Boy, oh boy..."
- Bob Brenly (1990–91 radio; 2005–2012 TV)
- Thom Brennaman (1990–95)
- **Pat Hughes** (1996–present); radio play-by-play; "This ball's got a chaaaance...GONE!" "Get out the tape measure, LONG gone!"
- Josh Lewin (1997)
- Chip Caray (1998–2004) "Swung on and belted!" "Fisted!"
- Andy Masur (1999–2006); secondary play-by-play and pre-post game host

== 2000s-2010s ==
- Joe Carter (2001–2002) "Like a deer with headlights!"
- Dave Otto (2001–2002) "You gotta be some kind of strong..."
- Len Kasper (2005–2020) "Way back! It's outta here!" "They've gone back-to-back!" "Oh, baby!"
- Dan Plesac (2005–2008); substitute broadcaster; CSN Chicago only
- Cory Provus (2007–2008); secondary play-by-play and pre-post game host
- Judd Sirott (2009–2014); secondary play-by-play and pre-post game host
- Keith Moreland (2011–2013); radio color commentator
- Jim Deshaies (2013–present); color commentator, substitute TV play-by-play
- Ron Coomer (2014–present); radio color commentator
- Doug Glanville (2014–2019; 2021–2023); substitute color commentator
- Mark Grote (2015–2017); pre-post game host; substitute radio play-by-play
- Zach Zaidman (2018–present); pre-post game host; substitute radio play-by-play

== 2020s-2030s ==
- Ryan Dempster (2020–present); substitute color commentator
- Mark Grace (2020); substitute color commentator
- Sean Marshall (2020); substitute color commentator
- Jon Sciambi (2021–present); play-by-play
- Chris Myers (2021–2023); substitute play-by-play
- Beth Mowins (2021–2024); substitute play-by-play, first woman to broadcast a Cub game
- Ryne Sandberg (2021–2023); substitute color commentator
- Rick Sutcliffe (2021–present); substitute color commentator
- Joe Girardi (2022–2024); substitute/secondary color commentator
- Elise Menaker (2023–present); substitute/secondary color commentator
- Jon Lester (2024); substitute/secondary color commentator
- Alex Cohen (2024–present); substitute play-by-play
- Cliff Floyd (2025–present); substitute color commentator
