= WGN Sports =

Sports division of WGN-TV in Chicago

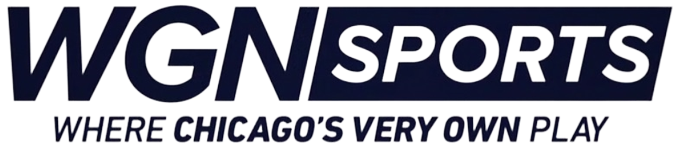
- Network: WGN-TV (1948–2022); WGN America (1978–2014)
- Launched: April 23, 1948
- Closed: October 9, 2022
- Country of origin: United States
- Owner: Nexstar Media Group
- Key people: Paul Rennie {(president/general manager, WGN-TV)
- Headquarters: Chicago, Illinois
- Major broadcasting contracts: Past: Chicago Blackhawks (NHL); Chicago Bulls (NBA); Chicago Cubs (MLB); Chicago White Sox (MLB); Chicago Fire FC (MLS)
- Formerly known as: WGN-TV Sports (1948–1993)
- Format: Sports
- Original language: English

WGN Sports (originally known as WGN-TV Sports from 1948 to 1993) was the programming division of WGN-TV (channel 9), an independent television station (now a CW owned-and-operated station) located in Chicago, Illinois, United States—which is owned by the Nexstar Media Group—that was responsible for all sports broadcasts on the station, some of which were previously also broadcast on its former national superstation feed, WGN America (now news and entertainment channel NewsNation).

At various points between the station's founding in 1948 until 2019, WGN Sports produced telecasts from several of Chicago's major professional sports teams, most notably the Chicago Cubs (MLB), Chicago White Sox (MLB), Chicago Bulls (NBA) and Chicago Blackhawks (NHL). Since the inception of the sports programming unit, the station had produced ancillary pre-game and post-game shows for most of its sporting events, including The Lead-Off Man (pre-game) and The Tenth Inning (post-game) for its Cubs and White Sox baseball telecasts and BullsEye for its telecasts of Bulls basketball games. In addition to those shown over WGN-TV within the Chicago market, game telecasts produced by the station were also syndicated to television stations in other parts of Illinois as well as portions of Indiana and Iowa that are within the respective broadcast territories of the contracted teams.

WGN-TV wound down its broadcasts of team-based sports programming between March and September 2019, beginning with the conclusion of Bulls and Blackhawks game coverage that spring, as the four professional teams prepared to make their game telecasts cable-exclusive (with the Cubs planning to move their telecasts to Marquee Sports Network upon its launch on February 22, 2020, and the Bulls, Blackhawks and White Sox relegating their local television broadcasts to existing regional sports network partner NBC Sports Chicago beginning with the Bulls' 2019–20 preseason schedule), thereby ending the Chicago market's distinction as the only remaining American media market to regularly offer over-the-air telecasts of sporting events from NBA, NHL and Major League Baseball teams. Amidst this hiatus, in February 2020, Chicago Fire FC (MLS) announced a multi-year agreement with WGN-TV to transfer their over-the-air telecasts to the station beginning with its 2020 season, returning regular sporting events to the station after a seven-month lag. WGN-TV's final sports broadcast was the October 9 matchup between the Fire and the New England Revolution, as a result of Apple TV reaching an exclusive 10-year worldwide broadcast deal with MLS.

Sports programming—in the form of national telecasts from the network’s sports division—would return to WGN-TV in February 2023 via a sublicensing agreement with The CW (which is majority owned by Nexstar) to broadcast LIV Golf tournaments that WCIU-TV (channel 26), the network’s Chicago affiliate at the time, chose to forego; the remainder of The CW’s sports programming moved to WGN-TV when it rejoined the network after a nine-year absence in September 2024.

== History ==
Throughout its history, WGN-TV has had a long-standing association with Chicago sports. The station has been noted for being one of a handful of commercial television stations in the United States—and, from the early 2000s until 2019, the only such station—to maintain a substantial schedule of locally originated telecasts from multiple major professional sports franchises. WGN is also among the few local television stations to have regularly carried events from teams in any of the five major sports leagues that have historically contracted their games for over-the-air broadcast well into the 21st century, even as professional sports franchises migrated most or all of their locally originated game telecasts to regional sports networks that require a subscription to a multichannel television provider (including cable, satellite, IPTV and fiber optic–based services) to receive, citing the hefty rights fees those services pay for the contractual rights that factor as major drivers of league and team revenue.

Each of the city's major professional sports franchises, along with several area collegiate teams, have had their games regularly televised over channel 9. The one exception is the Chicago Bears, who, like other NFL franchises, are bound by network broadcasting contracts by the National Football League for the most part, though most teams license some of their preseason games for regional over-the-air broadcast through in-house syndication units; although the Bears' cable-originated games have occasionally aired on WGN-TV by arrangement with ESPN under NFL provisions pertaining to national cable telecasts within a franchise's home market.

=== Chicago Cubs baseball ===
WGN-TV's respective relationships with Chicago's two Major League Baseball (MLB) franchises, the Chicago Cubs (of the National League) and the Chicago White Sox (of the American League), trace back to shortly before the station's inception in April 1948. Coverage of baseball games involving the Chicago Cubs has perhaps typified WGN-TV's programming identity, due to the popularity of the telecasts both locally and, as a superstation, throughout the Midwestern United States. On March 7 of that year, Channel 9 acquired the local television rights to broadcast all of the Cubs's daytime home games at Wrigley Field during the 1948 season, beginning with the team's April 23 game, in which the Cubs were set to play against the St. Louis Cardinals. (The Cubs would not hold nighttime games at Wrigley Field until August 1988, when it became the last MLB club to begin holding games after sunset.) The team's broadcast partnership with the Cubs owes itself to sister radio station WGN (720 AM)'s longtime role as the flagship of the team's radio network that dates to 1924 (when the Chicago Tribune acquired the station from Zenith-Edgewater Beach Broadcasting) and would last until 2014. The station aired its inaugural sports telecast on April 16, two weeks after WGN-TV signed on, involving an exhibition rivalry game between the Cubs and the White Sox (which the Sox won, 4–1).

WGN-TV shared the local telecast rights to the Cubs with WBKB-TV (channel 4, now CBS owned-and-operated station WBBM-TV on channel 2) until 1951, with Channel 9 gaining exclusive rights to the Cubs broadcasts starting in 1952. Jack Brickhouse, the longtime sports director—and later, vice president of sports programming—for the WGN television and radio stations, handled play-by-play announcing duties for the home games of both teams until 1967, and continued to call Cubs games until his retirement from broadcasting in 1981. Combining his relationships with both the Cubs and White Sox, Brickhouse called over 5,000 baseball games during his career, sharing the booth with announcers such as Milo Hamilton, Lou Boudreau, Vince Lloyd (who also served as a sports anchor for WGN-TV) and Lloyd Pettit (who also served as a WGN-TV news and sports anchor during the timeframe).

The station's relationship with the Cubs was further cemented on June 16, 1981, when the Tribune Company (renamed Tribune Media in August 2014 following the spin-off of its publishing division) purchased an 81% share in the franchise from William Wrigley III – who sold the franchise to alleviate himself of the large estate taxes that were accrued upon inheriting the team following the death of his parents – for $20.5 million. The sale was approved in a unanimous vote among the National League team owners on August 6 of that year. The purchase made Tribune the second operator of a superstation to own an MLB franchise (alongside Ted Turner, who owned the Atlanta Braves, which aired its games over his Atlanta independent WTBS) and one of three companies that owned television stations in the home markets of the teams they owned (along with Gene Autry, who then owned the California Angels and Los Angeles independent [and eventual WGN-TV sister station] KTLA in Los Angeles). (Detroit Tigers owner John Fetzer also owned television and radio stations in the Midwest during his ownership of the team from 1956 to 1983; however, none were based within the Detroit market.)

With the retirement of Brickhouse after the 1981 season, longtime announcer Harry Caray was dispatched from the South Side to replace him as the Cubs' lead television voice, under an initial two-year deal with the WGN television and radio stations. The decision to move most of the White Sox's game telecasts to over-the-air pay television led to his decision to switch team play-by-play allegiances, as the limited exposure that the Sox would experience as a result of having the majority of games available over Sportsvision (which required a set-top descrambler box to receive the signal) would limit the team's television accessibility. For the next 16 years, primarily working with analyst Steve Stone, Caray further established his place among Chicago's most-beloved personalities. Like Brickhouse, Caray was known for displaying an unapologetic, home team-oriented enthusiasm to his game calls, punctuated with memorable signature catchphrases for big plays (such as Caray's "Holy Cow!" and Brickhouse's "Hey-hey!"). Caray also brought his unique rendition of "Take Me Out to the Ball Game" during the seventh-inning stretch to the channel 9 broadcast booth. With WGN-TV's emerging prominence as a national superstation during the 1980s and 1990s, Caray's fan base – and that of the Cubs – grew beyond Chicago and the Midwestern U.S. into other parts of the country. On August 7, 2001, WGN-TV aired its first sports broadcast and the Chicago market's first live locally originated telecast to be presented in high definition, involving a regular season game between the Cubs and the Colorado Rockies; beginning with the 2004 Cubs and White Sox seasons, the station began broadcasting most Cubs, White Sox and Bulls home games in high definition.

On August 22, 2009, the Tribune Company transferred a controlling 95% interest in the team and its 25% stake in regional sports network Comcast SportsNet Chicago (now NBC Sports Chicago) to Thomas S. Ricketts (son of TD Ameritrade founder J. Joseph Ricketts) in a leveraged partnership arrangement – designed to prevent Tribune, which was in the midst of Chapter 11 bankruptcy protection proceedings due to the $13 billion in debt it accrued through Sam Zell's 2007 buyout and subsequent privatization of the company, from incurring taxes in an outright sale – for $845 million. Tribune continued to maintain a 5% interest in the Cubs as part of a 10-year partnership to satisfy IRS issues concerning the deal; on January 25, 2019, Tribune sold off the minority share to Ricketts-owned parent company Chicago Entertainment Ventures, LLC for $107.5 million.

On November 5, 2013, the Cubs exercised an option to opt out of their television contract with WGN-TV – which was originally set to end in 2022 – following the 2014 season, with the intent of seeking a higher-value deal for the next five-year contractual period. As part of the opt-out clause exercise, the team gave the station a 30-day window to make a counteroffer for a deal that would last through the 2019 season (which, in any instance, would raise the rights fees that WGN pays the team from an annual rate of $20 million, and align the contract with the end of the team's cable rights deal). On January 7, 2014, as part of a four-year contract with the station, WGN-TV announced that it would air a reduced slate of 45 Cubs games per season beginning in 2015; the remaining share of over-the-air broadcasts, totaling 25 games per season, would air on ABC-owned WLS-TV (channel 7), which acquired partial broadcast rights to those games on December 12, 2014.

=== Chicago White Sox baseball ===
On March 9, 1948, two days after the station signed its initial broadcast contract with the Cubs, WGN-TV signed a separate agreement with the Chicago White Sox to carry a package of daytime and evening games held at Comiskey Park, including all 21 nighttime games that were scheduled for the 1948 season, originally set to take effect with the April 20 season opener against the Detroit Tigers. For the 1962 season, WGN-TV would occasionally cover the Cubs and White Sox games occurring simultaneously, using the respective announcing staffs for both teams, which used "bingo" as a signal to other announcers to switch to coverage of the other ongoing game. When the Sox telecast rights came up for renewal in the spring of 1966, WGN-TV management rejected the Sox's offer to carry up to 162 games per year (amounting to a full season) during the next contractual period, due to the scheduling conflicts that airing such a large game schedule would pose with its Cubs telecasts. (At the time, WGN was contracted to air a minimum of 86 Cubs games per season under an existing two-year contract.) As a result, on November 9, 1966, the Sox struck a five-year deal with Field Communications-controlled UHF independent WFLD-TV (channel 32, now a Fox owned-and-operated station) to televise the team's full slate of home and away games starting in 1968.

Those rights were passed onto WSNS-TV (channel 44, now a Telemundo owned-and-operated station), as a result of then-owner Essaness Television Corporation signing a one-year agreement on August 3, 1972, that would see the competing independent acquire a package of at least 144 White Sox regular season games, beginning with the team's 1973 schedule. Although WSNS-TV had exclusivity over the White Sox telecasts, WGN maintained an outsourcing agreement with that station, under which Channel 9 handled production responsibilities for the games on behalf of WSNS. Around this time, White Sox broadcaster Harry Caray joined the WGN family, occasionally acting as a substitute sports anchor for its evening newscasts for most of the 1970s. In December 1980, Channel 9 signed a partial broadcasting agreement with White Sox, which confined its game telecasts to the team's road games—a reduced schedule of 60 games—for the 1981 season. The initial deal would have resulted in Cablevision (which had provided cable television service to the Chicago suburbs of Homewood and Oak Park by that time) broadcasting most of the team's home games through a production agreement with its SportsChannel production unit. Team co-owner Jerry Reinsdorf (a Chicago-area attorney and real estate investor) scuttled the Cablevision deal shortly after he and Eddie Einhorn assumed ownership of the team from Bill Veeck in December 1981, allowing WGN-TV to carry an additional slate of home games. (Sportschannel subsequently filed a breach of contract lawsuit against the White Sox as a result, with the new White Sox ownership contending that the original agreement was not binding for the 1982 season as contended by Cablevision.)

Former WGN Sports logo, used from November 11, 2002, to May 15, 2017.

Dissatisfied with the licensing fees it was receiving for the WGN telecasts, however, Reinsdorf and Einhorn (the latter being a former president of CBS Sports and founder of the defunct TVS Television Network syndicated sports service) decided to move the White Sox's telecasts to Sportsvision, a joint venture between the Reinsdorf–Einhorn partnership and Fred Eychaner, owner of upstart independent WPWR-TV (channel 60, now a MyNetworkTV owned-and-operated station on channel 50) through parent Metrowest Corporation. As Chicago was one of the last major metropolitan areas in the U.S. that had yet to be fully wired for cable television service, WPWR – which operated as a timeshare with HATCO-60-owned Spanish-language independent WBBS-TV (now UniMás owned-and-operated station WXFT-DT and sole occupant of channel 60) – would cede most of its broadcast day (running from 7:00 p.m. to 2:30 a.m.) to the subscription sports service, offering a mix of nighttime games from the White Sox and other local professional sports teams (including the Bulls and the Blackhawks); some of Sportsvision's Sox broadcasts were also simulcast over companion pay service ONTV (carried at the time over WSNS) and were also contracted out to WFLD to maintain free over-the-air coverage. (Due to low subscriber rates and resulting financial losses, Sox ownership sold Sportsvision to a venture of Cablevision Program Enterprises and The Washington Post Company in December 1983. The service, which evolved into SportsChannel Chicago in 1989, would move exclusively to cable on Cablevision's suburban Chicago systems in January 1984; Sportsvision's over-the-air sports rights were transferred to ONTV around this time.) With Harry Caray moving to Cubs play-by-play duties and Jimmy Piersall moving to Sportsvision as its pre- and post-game show host, the team hired former major league players Don Drysdale (who previously served as commentator for the California Angels and ABC Sports) and Ken Harrelson to helm the Sox broadcast booth for the 1982 season.

The Sox's eight-year tenure on WFLD ended in acrimony, with WFLD management filing a lawsuit accusing the team of mismanagement that resulted in declining game viewership and profit losses on the contract as well as breached advertising agreements with local auto dealership collective Chicagoland Dodge Dealers. As part of an out-of-court settlement between Sox ownership and WFLD, on September 14, 1989, the Reinsdorf ownership group signed a five-year agreement with WGN-TV to carry a minimum of 45 White Sox games per year, beginning with the 1990 season. Because of reductions to the team's local over-the-air broadcast schedule (due to shares of its game telecasts being split with regional and national cable sports networks and Major League Baseball's broadcast network partners) predating the Sox's third run on Channel 9, since the White Sox returned to the station in 1990, the number of White Sox games shown on the station had decreased to anywhere between 30 and 40 per season.

=== Chicago Bulls basketball ===
In August 1966, WGN-TV signed an agreement with the Chicago Bulls to broadcast games involving the upstart NBA franchise under a five-year agreement beginning with the 1966–67 season, beginning with an initial slate of up to twelve away games for the team's inaugural season. In the spring of 1972, the Bulls signed a three-year agreement with WSNS-TV to broadcast Bulls basketball games beginning with the 1973–74 season. The team returned to WGN for the 1976–77 season, running on the station for an additional eight seasons. Jack Brickhouse, Lorn Brown, Milo Hamilton and Bob Costas were among those assigned to work as Bulls play-by-play announcers for the WGN telecasts, with Johnny "Red" Kerr serving as an analyst.

In the fall of 1984, the Bulls signed an agreement with WFLD to broadcast the team's games for four years, effective with the 1985–86 season. In connection with the out-of-court settlement between WFLD station management and the White Sox, through the same agreement signed on September 14, 1989, that resulted in that station also re-acquiring the local television rights to the Sox, the Bulls (which Reinsdorf – as part of Chicago Professional Sports Limited Partnership, a 23-member majority shareholder group that acquired portions of its 56% share of the team from shares owned by, among others, the estate of longtime owner Arthur M. Wirtz and New York Yankees owner George Steinbrenner – bought in March 1985 for an estimated $9.2 million) announced that it would move its local television broadcasts back to WGN-TV under a five-year deal, beginning with the 1989–90 season. The return of the Bulls to WGN-TV was a major boon for the station, as it overlapped with the six-season NBA championship dynasty that flourished during Michael Jordan's tenure with the team.

=== Chicago Blackhawks hockey ===
Channel 9 originally served as the broadcast home for the NHL's Chicago Blackhawks from 1961 until 1975. Blackhawks broadcasts on WGN-TV were limited to away games, as then-owner Bill Wirtz had prohibited local coverage of his team's home games out of concern that televising those matches within the Chicago market could negatively impact ticket sales. (Televised Blackhawks road games were subsequently carried on WFLD from 1975 to 1978, and then shifted to WSNS-TV from 1978 to 1980.)

After he inherited the team from his father following the elder Wirtz's death in September 2007, Rocky Wirtz decided to end the longstanding embargo on local home game telecasts. On March 30, 2008, the Blackhawks announced three-year broadcasting agreements with Channel 9 and Comcast SportsNet Chicago that would allow both broadcasters to carry a divided schedule of the team's home and away games beginning with the 2008–09 season. The WGN deal marked the first time that the Blackhawks broadcast any of their games on a Chicago-area broadcast television station (outside of occasional network broadcasts), since their away games were carried on the Sportsvision and ONTV subscription services between 1982 and 1985. Since the start of the initial contract during the 2008–09 campaign, WGN-TV has carried between 20 and 25 Blackhawks games per season. On February 15, 2011, it was announced that the team had renewed their broadcast contract with WGN-TV for five additional years through the 2015–16 NHL season.

=== Chicago Fire FC soccer ===
On February 19, 2020, WGN-TV announced a multi-year agreement with Chicago Fire FC, awarding it the exclusive local broadcast rights to the franchise's Major League Soccer games as well as a monthly series featuring interviews and profiles of Fire players, coaches and fans; the initial 2020 season broadcast schedule will encompass 24 regular season matches, 18 of which will air in prime time. (The remaining ten televised Fire games will air on the MLS's national broadcast partners, ABC, ESPN, FS1, Univision and UniMás, the latter of which will air locally via O&Os WGBO-DT [channel 66] and WXFT-DT [channel 60], respectively; all WGN-televised Fire matches will also be streamed nationally via ESPN+.) The first Fire telecast to air on the station was an early-afternoon away game against the New England Revolution on March 7. (The inaugural season of Fire broadcasts on Channel 9 was quickly abbreviated due to the MLS's March 12 decision to suspend its 2020 regular season amid health concerns raised by the coronavirus pandemic.)

=== Other sporting events ===
==== Professional sports ====
WGN-TV also aired game telecasts featuring other professional sports teams that have since relocated from Chicago or have folded completely, including the Chicago Spurs of the National Professional Soccer League (from 1966 until 1967, when the NPSL's merger with the United Soccer Association to form the North American Soccer League led to the Spurs being relocated to Kansas City to alleviate competition with the consolidated league's existing Chicago Mustangs soccer club), original Chicago NBA expansion franchise Chicago Packers/Zephyrs (from 1961 until 1963, when the franchise moved to Baltimore as the Baltimore Bullets) and the Chicago Fire of the World Football League (from 1974 to 1975, after which owner Thomas Origer folded the team amid its injury-traced poor performance during the second half of its sole season).

WGN-TV carried select regular season NFL games involving the Chicago Bears and the now-defunct Chicago Cardinals via DuMont during the 1951 NFL season; following that, the Bears and Cardinals moved their telecasts to ABC – and by association, ABC O&O WBKB-TV (now WLS-TV) – under a limited contract that lasted until CBS gained primary rights to both teams as part of a league-wide television package in 1956. In November 2010, WGN-TV became the home for preseason and regular season games involving the Bears – the latter originally consisting of NFL Network Thursday Night Football simulcasts – that are not carried by a broadcast network. (Under NFL broadcasting rules, games that are televised on the league's national cable partners are required to be simulcast over a local broadcast station in the home markets of the participating teams.) This marked the first time that Channel 9 had broadcast games from all five of Chicago's legacy professional sports teams during the course of a single season; the Bears simulcasts were not carried on WGN America due to conflicts that would be incurred with the NFL Network telecasts. Among the Bears games shown on the station were simulcasts of ESPN-televised Monday Night Football broadcasts (including match-ups against Dallas on October 1, 2012, and Washington on September 23, 2019). In those cases, although ABC-owned WLS-TV has right of first refusal to MNF simulcasts as its corporate parent, The Walt Disney Company, holds majority ownership of ESPN, WLS management elected to exercise the station's right of first refusal over the game telecasts to avoid preempting ABC's live Monday night broadcast of Dancing with the Stars.

==== Collegiate, semi-professional and amateur sports ====
Along with Major League Baseball telecasts, WGN-TV's initial sports lineup included a Saturday night wrestling program produced by National Wrestling Alliance promoter Fred Kohler, Wrestling From Marigold, originating from the Marigold Gardens arena in downtown Chicago. Presided by play-by-play announcer Jack Brickhouse and commentator Vince Lloyd, WGN co-produced the program for national broadcast on the DuMont Television Network, which aired the program from September 1949 until March 1955, during the station's tenure as a DuMont affiliate. (WGN-TV continued to air Wrestling from Marigold as a local program until its cancellation by Channel 9 in 1957.) From 1948 until 1994, WGN also carried college basketball and football games from universities around the region (including the Illinois Fighting Illini, the Northwestern Wildcats, the DePaul Blue Demons, the Loyola Ramblers and the Notre Dame Fighting Irish). From 1966 to 1991, the station also carried a package of college football and basketball games involving teams in the Big Ten Conference; WGN also aired coverage of high school football games involving teams in the Chicago Public High School League from 1958 to 1979 and the Chicago College All-Star Game from 1948 to 1976.

The station's coverage of Little League Baseball games during the late 1940s, 1950s and 1960s was noted for the innovation of the center field camera angle now commonplace in baseball coverage. First utilized by the station in 1951, during Little League games held at Thillens Stadium, the angle – which allowed for clear views of pitch movement, action between the pitcher and the batter, and more effective close-ups than were capable with the then-standard overhead shot from behind-the-plate at upper deck – was used for those telecasts due to the smaller size of the stadium and the lack of a suitable place to place a camera behind the plate. The angles were later used for Cubs game coverage and was quickly adopted for local and national baseball telecasts by other professional and collegiate broadcasters.

==== Horse racing ====
WGN-TV has also held broadcast rights to the Illinois Derby, Hawthorne Gold Cup Handicap and Arlington Million (except in years NBC Sports carried coverage as part of the Road to the Breeders' Cup) horse races. During the years leading up to the programming separation of WGN-TV and now-former national feed WGN America, the Illinois Derby and Hawthorne Gold Cup Handicap telecasts were shown exclusively over the Chicago area signal. The restrictions did not apply to the Arlington Million, which continues to be simulcast on WGN America in selected years, even after the 2014 removal of Chicago-originated sports programming from its lineup, as one of two international-stature sporting events produced by Tribune Broadcasting properties to air on the channel (coverage of the Los Angeles Marathon from sister station KTLA being the other). In years which NBC Sports does not cover the Arlington Million as part of Road to the Breeders' Cup, WGN America carries the national simulcast, since the winner obtains an automatic bid to the Breeders' Cup Turf.

== Broadcast rights issues ==
When permitted under its contracts, WGN America occasionally aired national simulcasts of WGN's sports programming, mostly Cubs, White Sox and Bulls games. Baseball and basketball telecasts on WGN-TV and other superstations began raising the ire of Major League Baseball and NBA management during the 1980s and early 1990s, amid concerns over those broadcasts undercutting the value of broadcast contracts with other national broadcast and cable networks. The station's telecasts also ran into contractual restrictions after WGN became a charter affiliate of The WB in January 1995.

Restrictions similar to those that affected WGN America—as well as the absence of contractual streaming rights—also prevent WGN-TV from running sports highlights during live streams of the station's newscasts on the WGNTV.com website (unusual since some stations, including a few of WGN-TV/WGN America's Tribune-owned sister stations, have had permission to run sports highlights during live streams of local newscasts on their websites and mobile applications), which are substituted with a disclaimer screen denoting the restrictions that runs in place of the sports segment's video feed and accompanied by the audio portion of the segment.

=== Airtime leasing agreements ===
Following its launch in January 1993, WGN-TV began leasing airtime on sister cable news channel Chicagoland Television (CLTV) to carry a limited number of live Chicago Cubs game telecasts that were prohibited from airing on the station due to Major League Baseball's national television contracts at the time with CBS and ESPN. (The first WGN-leased game on CLTV, which provided supplementary local cable coverage to the team's existing agreement with SportsChannel Chicago, was an exhibition game against the Seattle Mariners on March 21, 1993. CLTV also offered late-night replays of afternoon Cubs games from the previous gameday.)

Additional games would be transferred to CLTV beginning with the 1998 season, in order to comply with contractual limits imposed by The WB (which began offering its programming over WGN upon the network's January 11, 1995 launch) on the number of network program preemptions, other than those caused by long-form breaking news coverage, that could occur on an annual basis. The move substantially reduced the number of games shown on WGN-TV from 144 games in 1997 to 92 games in 1998, with 62 additional WGN-contracted games being placed on CLTV and a select number of additional games originally set to air on CLTV also being shifted to WGN. As a result, although it continued to air some weekday games during network prime time hours periodically, Channel 9 shifted to showing the majority of scheduled sports broadcasts on weekday and weekend afternoons, weekday late evenings (in the case of games held in the West Coast after network programming ended locally) and weekend evenings. (During situations when WGN was scheduled to air sports broadcasts in place of network programs from The WB and, from 2006 to 2016, The CW, WGN-TV rebroadcast the sports-displaced network shows on a tape-delayed basis later in the week, usually in a weekend evening timeslot not occupied by a scheduled game telecast, as neither The WB nor The CW has ever aired prime time programs on Saturdays and as The CW had embargoed providing programs on Sundays from September 2009 until October 2018). Beginning in 1999, CLTV also added a slate of overflow games produced for Fox Sports Net Chicago, which would also offer the games over proprietary overflow channel Fox Sports Net Chicago Plus (which aired the games in place of CLTV in area suburbs served by a cable provider that did not offer the news channel on their lineup).

On July 8, 1999, Tribune Broadcasting entered into a leasing arrangement with Weigel Broadcasting, under which the latter's flagship independent station, WCIU-TV (channel 26, now a CW affiliate), would carry a select number of Cubs, White Sox and Bulls games—a cumulative average of 40 telecasts each year involving the three teams—that would be produced by WGN Sports for exclusive broadcast within the Chicago market, starting with the 1999–2000 Bulls season. (The WCIU telecasts were branded under the "CubsNet," "SoxNet" and "BullsNet" umbrellas until 2004, when WGN began marketing the telecasts under the brand "WGN Sports on The U". CLTV would continue to air select games not covered by the WCIU agreement until 2002.) On February 19, 2015, Weigel terminated its agreement with Tribune to carry WGN-produced Cubs and White Sox telecasts, in an effort to limit scheduling conflicts with WCIU's then-recently launched early-prime time newscast (produced through a news share agreement with WLS-TV); the WGN-leased overflow broadcasts were moved to WPWR-TV – airing under the brand "WGN Sports on My50" – beginning with the 2015 Cubs and White Sox seasons. The sub-licensing agreements as well as the splintering of the team's telecast rights with regional cable sports networks – Fox Sports Net Chicago (later FSN Chicago) from 1999 until 2003 and then Comcast SportsNet Chicago/NBC Sports Chicago beginning in 2004 – resulted in the number of Cubs games produced by WGN-TV gradually decreasing in recent years (down to 70 per season by 2008). (Until the Fox Sports Chicago deal, the Cubs were the last Major League Baseball franchise that did not have local broadcast contracts with both cable and broadcast television outlets.)

As a result of its decision to exempt the station from a renewed affiliation agreement involving the group's 12 other CW-affiliated stations dating to the network's 2006 founding with CW managing partner CBS Corporation, on May 23, 2016, Tribune announced that WGN-TV would convert into an independent station effective September 1. This would allow WGN-TV to increase the amount of sports programming that it could air during the calendar year (albeit, with far fewer televised games for each of the contracted teams than it had previously been able to air during its first tenure as an independent between 1956 and 1995) and give it full over-the-air exclusivity over Cubs, White Sox, Bulls and Blackhawks telecasts, resulting in the termination of its outsourcing agreement with WPWR (which would concurrently become a primary CW affiliate through an agreement with parent company Fox Television Stations).

==== WGN–Chicago Bulls dispute with the NBA ====
In 1982, the NBA instituted limits on the number of basketball games that teams could license to designated superstations – such as WGN-TV – that reached at least 5% of American cable households (not counting carriage within their home market), applying only to games that would conflict with those airing on the NBA's national cable partners, ESPN or USA Network, while allowing them to continue carrying up to 41 games per season under existing NBA local broadcast rules. The league's Board of Governors applied a set limit in June 1985, restricting the number of seasonal NBA telecasts that could be licensed to superstations to 25 games (which was applied to the Bulls' 1989 contract with Channel 9).

In April 1990, NBA Commissioner David Stern lowered the number of superstation-licensed telecasts to an annual limit of 20 games, a move it claimed would limit negative impacts on game viewership on the league's national television partners (at the time, TNT and NBC) as a result of concurring deals involving WGN and the Bulls and TBS and the Atlanta Hawks (the latter of which was part of an overall deal with Turner Sports that granted TNT national telecast rights to games from other NBA teams). The new restriction spurred a conspiracy and antitrust lawsuit that was filed by the Bulls (one of two NBA teams that voted against the proposal, along with the New Jersey Nets, then broadcasting over Secaucus, New Jersey–based superstation WWOR-TV) and Tribune Broadcasting with the United States District Court for the Northern District of Illinois on October 16, 1990, alleging that the league rules would harm the Bulls, their fans and WGN and that Stern's proposal was aimed at "phas[ing] out such superstations telecasts entirely in increments of five games each year over the next five years." (The NBA contended the restriction was exempt from antitrust law under a provision of the Sports Broadcasting Act of 1961, which was deemed in later rulings to only be applicable to the sale or transfer a national game package to a television network and not those involving individual teams.)

On January 26, 1991, Senior U.S. District Judge Hubert L. Will granted a permanent injunction in favor of the Bulls and WGN, prohibiting the league from instituting the policy on the determination that the NBA's superstation licensing restrictions were "a significant restraint of trade" in violation of the Sherman Antitrust Act. On February 20, 1992, attorneys with the NBA, WGN-TV and the Bulls reached an agreement to let WGN broadcast 30 Bulls games for the 1992–93 season, per the NBA's allotment that teams could license superstations to carry 30 games in a given season (up from both the limits mandated by the injunction and the proposed limit that resulted in the suit), a rule that would remain in place through the 1993–94 season before reverting to the originally proposed 25-game limit. Subsequently, on April 14 of that year, a three-judge panel of the Seventh Circuit Court of Appeals with the Northern District Court that overheard an appeal of Will's decision held that the superstation limit was an illegal restraint of trade. On November 5, the U.S. Supreme Court upheld the appellate court decision.

When the case was remanded back to Judge Will in October 1993, it was now based on new contractual terms in the league's deal with NBC that awarded it cable rights to games not covered by a national cable agreement, despite the network having yet to own general entertainment or sports-based cable outlets, as well as plans to implement a licensing fee (reportedly $250,000 per game) to teams that telecast over superstations. Bulls owner Jerry Reinsdorf (using the sustained fanbase of the Cubs through the WGN telecasts, even at times when the team's performance was mediocre to poor, as an example) and attorney Joel Chefitz both argued that the team's national availability through WGN was vital to maintaining the team's fanbase and to its financial success following Michael Jordan's sudden retirement from basketball and move to baseball. On January 6, 1995, Judge Will affirmed that the NBA's efforts to restrict carriage of the Bulls on WGN-TV was a "naked restraint" of competition in violation of antitrust laws, rejecting arguments by NBA representatives that broad television coverage through superstations hurt revenues for national, regional and local telecasts paid to the league and individual teams and noted that evidence "revealed that superstation coverage of the Bulls and Hawks may actually have helped to promote greater public interest in NBA basketball." The ruling permitted the station to televise at least 30 games (eleven fewer than the 41 annual games that the Bulls and WGN requested) over the Chicago signal and superstation feed, while allowing the NBA to impose a reasonable rights fee (around $40,000, rather than the $100,000 licensing fee sought by the NBA) for broadcasts of each game, based on the consideration that the league received more than $2 million in annual copyright payments from WGN's Bulls broadcasts.

On September 10, 1996, a three-judge Seventh Circuit panel overturned the 1992 decision and remanded the case to be re-heard by a federal judge. Although the Bulls initially maintained that WGN would still be able to nationally televise Bulls games, in October 1996, WGN-TV announced plans to restrict distribution of the 35 Bulls games it was scheduled to air during the 1996–97 season (a five-game increase over the 1995–96 season) exclusively to the Chicago area signal. (The WGN superstation would carry movies in place of the embargoed Bulls telecasts; the 9:00 p.m. newscast was also preempted nationally as a result of the restrictions due to their being subject to delay on the Chicago signal due to game overruns.) Despite the feed's continued carriage of Cubs and White Sox games and its purposing as the national feed of The WB for markets without a local affiliate, cable provider Tele-Communications, Inc. (TCI) – which provided service to portions of the immediate Chicago area through its Chicago Cable TV arm – cited the national restrictions on the Bulls as well as its own decision to make room for additional cable channels for its subsequent decision to remove the national WGN channel from its systems. However, criticism of the move from some subscribers led TCI to reverse course and retain the WGN superstation feed from affected systems in Illinois, Indiana, Iowa, Wisconsin and Michigan. (Some TCI systems elsewhere would not reinstate WGN until as late as 1998, through an effort by Tribune and the superstation feed's uplink carrier, United Video Satellite Group, to take advantage of TBS's conversion into a hybrid basic cable network.)

On December 12, 1996, the Bulls and WGN reached a settlement to the six-year-long lawsuit, which allowed WGN to air an extended schedule of 41 games – the maximum allowed under the NBA's local television policies – during the 1996–97 season (35 that would air only on the Chicago signal and twelve that would be shown on both the local and superstation feeds). From the 1997–98 season thereafter, the number of games permitted to air on the superstation feed increased to 15 per year. The parties also agreed to replace the NBA's superstation tax with a revenue sharing model, under which the NBA would collect 50% of all advertising revenue accrued from the national WGN telecasts. The restrictions, however, resulted in some Bulls away games televised by the WGN national feed being unavailable to television providers within the opposing team's designated market if the game was not carried by a national network, a local television station or a regional sports network.

==== Major League Baseball issues ====
Attempts to restrict WGN's access to professional sports also extended to Major League Baseball under the stewardship of Fay Vincent, whose tenure as League Commissioner included various unsuccessful moves to impose blackout rules for games carried on superstations. Even prior to Tribune's purchase of the team, Chicago Cubs management had lauded the benefits that WGN-TV's telecasts of their games for providing needed exposure and bolstering their fanbase dating to 1953, when Cubs business manager James P. Gallagher expressed that the team's telecasts "[had] helped to promote interest in the Cubs and in baseball in general in the Chicago area[, helping] to keep [..] attendance up and [bringing] the game[s] to many people who could not get out to the ball park."

In August 1990, the MLB filed a petition to the Federal Communications Commission (FCC) to propose allowing local television stations to force cable systems to blackout superstation-licensed games involving local franchises within the team's home market through a change in how network program non-duplication rules define a "network program" to include live sports broadcasts shown simultaneously on local and out-of-market stations available via cable. United Video – which, in addition to WGN, also distributed sister stations WPIX in New York City (which carried games from the New York Yankees), KTLA in Los Angeles (which aired Los Angeles Dodgers games) and KWGN-TV in Denver (which aired Colorado Rockies games) – filed an opposition to the move, citing that the proposal would result in the superstation signals being "chopped up even more and made even more difficult for cable systems to receive." Tribune Broadcasting contended that the petition was "protectionist," noting the lack of evidence that "viewers' current ability to choose between a local broadcast and a different version of the same game is harmful to either sports or the public interest." Tribune Broadcasting, TBS parent Turner Broadcasting System and the National Cable Television Association (NCTA) also filed petitions opposing the MLB request.

In April 1992, Vincent lobbied Congress to repeal the compulsory license that allowed cable systems to carry superstation signals. In July 1992, Vincent ordered the relocation of the Cubs, the Atlanta Braves and two other National League Eastern Division teams that did not regularly broadcast their games on superstations (the Cincinnati Reds and the St. Louis Cardinals) to different divisions starting with the 1993 season, with the Cubs and the Cardinals being reassigned the NL Western Division and the Braves and the Reds being moved to the Eastern Division. Tribune responded to the move with a breach of contract lawsuit, alleging that the action overstepped the bounds of Vincent's authority. The move sparked concerns that WGN-TV's revenues from the Cubs telecasts would be impacted if the Cubs were forced to play a larger number of games against other Western Division teams based in the Pacific Time Zone, resulting in an increased number of games being shown in the late evening locally and potentially impact advertising revenue from the 9:00 p.m. newscast if it had to delay it after prime time more frequently because of the late baseball starts. Tribune representatives accused Vincent using the issue as part of his and some team owners animosity toward superstations to deflect from management or performance-related problems within their baseball clubs, though the Cubs denied Vincent's claim that its opposition to the move had mainly to do with the "scheduling difficulties that will be experienced by [...] WGN-TV." U.S. District Judge Suzanne B. Conlon ruled in favor of Tribune and the Cubs in a preliminary ruling on July 23, 1992. A majority of MLB team owners passed a motion of no confidence against Vincent as MLB Commissioner in an 18-9-1 vote on September 4, 1992; he subsequently resigned on September 6.

=== Loss of sports rights ===
On January 2, 2019, NBC Sports Chicago reached exclusive multi-year deals with the White Sox, Bulls and Blackhawks to take effect that fall, relegating their regional telecasts exclusively to multichannel television services. Subsequently, on February 13, the Cubs and Sinclair Broadcast Group (which was sued by Tribune for breach of contract in August 2018, after Sinclair's various attempts to use loopholes around FCC rules to acquire all of Tribune's broadcasting properties created regulatory hurdles in the former's acquisition of the company and Tribune's resulting termination of the attempted merger) announced of the formation of the Marquee Sports Network, a regional sports network planned for launch in the spring of 2020 that would serve as the exclusive home of the Cubs' regional game telecasts. Unlike in New York and Los Angeles (where WPIX and KTLA maintain broadcast relationships with the New York Mets/New York Yankees and the Los Angeles Dodgers, respectively), neither team has elected to enter into a licensing agreement with either network to allow some games to remain available over-the-air via WGN-TV or another Chicago-area station.

As such, beginning with the April 1 game between the Blackhawks and the Winnipeg Jets, WGN wound down its local sports coverage throughout the spring and summer of 2019 as the station's contracts with all four teams expired. The station's final Bulls game aired on April 9, 2019, against the New York Knicks at Madison Square Garden. WGN-TV's final Cubs game broadcast aired on September 27, 2019, against the rival St. Louis Cardinals at Busch Stadium. WGN-TV's final sports telecast involving one of the four legacy professional sports franchises that the station has been involved with during its history was the second game of a White Sox–Detroit Tigers doubleheader at Guaranteed Rate Field on September 28, 2019. Ancillary sporting events (such as the Arlington Million horse race) may continue to be shown on WGN following the removal of its professional sports telecasts.

WGN-TV's contract with the Fire ended at the conclusion of the 2022 season as a result of Apple TV gaining exclusive worldwide rights to all MLS matchups for 10 years, beginning in 2023. The deal left WGN-TV without sports programming for the first time in the station's 74-year history; however on February 25, 2023, WGN-TV began carrying LIV Golf tournament events through a time-brokerage deal with Nexstar; although the deal was signed with The CW, WCIU, which had been affiliated with the network since September 2019, agreed to cede rights to the Chicago market due to cross-ownership. WGN-TV, which disaffiliated from the network in September 2015, would rejoin The CW as an owned-and-operated station (as Nexstar acquired a controlling stake in the network from Paramount Global and Warner Bros. Discovery in October 2022) on September 1, 2024, at which time it began carrying the remainder of the network’s sublicensed national sports telecasts, including Atlantic Coast and Pac-12 Conference college sports, AVP volleyball tournaments and NASCAR O'Reilly Auto Parts Series races.

== Distribution outside the Chicago market ==
=== WGN America ===
During WGN-TV's 37-year run as a national superstation, its national feed – which eventually became known as WGN America in August 2008 – distributed most of the station's sports telecasts to multichannel television providers throughout the United States and Canada. From November 8, 1978, until December 31, 1989, Tulsa, Oklahoma-based satellite uplink firm United Video Inc. distributed the WGN-TV Chicago signal nationwide, which allowed viewers outside Chicago to watch the station's sports telecasts as they would be seen locally – with local advertising and station promotions intact – except where league rules applying to superstations (such as the WGN–Bulls–NBA dispute and restrictions on national superstation telecasts based on time periods where broadcast and cable partners held national exclusivity) as mentioned above or requests from local stations that held the exclusive local rights to opponents of the Chicago teams resulted in blackout restrictions applying to the game broadcasts. After syndication exclusivity rules were re-implemented on January 1, 1990, the major sports leagues began to impose some partial restrictions on the national carriage of WGN-televised sports broadcasts due to concerns over impacts to revenues from game attendance and national television rights. From 1996 until 2014, the national channel aired all Cubs and White Sox games and about 10 to 20 Chicago Bulls NBA games that WGN-TV televised locally in the Chicago market.

As part of Tribune's conversion of the network from a superstation into a general entertainment cable channel, the company announced that WGN America would no longer broadcast Chicago Cubs, Bulls and White Sox games originated on WGN-TV in the Chicago market to a national audience. Peter Liguori, then the president and chief executive officer of Tribune Media, cited the limited revenue and viewership accrued from the national simulcasts relative to their contractual expense – revenue was reportedly only covering 20% of the rights fees – behind the decision to drop the national telecasts. Several seasons of sub-par play by the Cubs after Tribune's sale of the team to Thomas S. Ricketts in late 2009 also played a factor, as the team's television package cost five times as much for rights fees alone as the revenue it brought in for the national broadcasts. (Ironically, two seasons later, the Cubs underwent a major turnaround and had its strongest season in decades, going on to win its first World Series championship since 1908; WGN America would air the Cubs' 2016 World Series victory parade on November 4 of that year.) Even prior to the decision, WGN America had chosen not to air certain sports-related programming carried on the Chicago signal such as the Blackhawks' victory parade following its 2010 Stanley Cup championship win and a half-hour special paying tribute to the late Cubs player and broadcaster Ron Santo in 2011. (In the respective cases, WGN-TV's coverage of Santo's funeral aired on the digital subchannels of selected stations owned by Tribune and its partner group Local TV, while the NHL Network provided a simulcast of the Chicago signal's feed of the Blackhawks' victory parade.) The final WGN Sports-produced game telecast to air on WGN America was a contest between the Bulls and the Golden State Warriors, held at Chicago's United Center, on December 6, 2014.

Outside of stations in Illinois, Indiana and Iowa that carried the games through syndication agreements, in the years preceding the end of professional team broadcasts on the station, WGN-produced sports telecasts were only viewable elsewhere in North America via Canadian television providers that carry the Chicago television station's signal or through the out-of-market sports packages NHL Centre Ice (for Blackhawks telecasts), NBA League Pass (for Bulls telecasts) and MLB Extra Innings (for Cubs and White Sox telecasts), sometimes incorporating local commercials and station promos that were omitted from the national simulcasts on WGN America in recent years. (This also was the case for WGN-produced games shown on WPWR-TV, as well as WLS-TV's Cubs broadcasts.) Prior to striking agreements with other stations in Illinois and Indiana to carry Blackhawks games in 2015, these methods were the only ways that American viewers could view WGN's Blackhawks game coverage outside the Chicago market, since WGN America was not permitted to carry the team's games due to the NHL's exclusive broadcast contracts (such as its national television deal with NBCUniversal that began in 2008).

=== Regional syndication ===
Dating back to at least the early 1980s, WGN-TV had syndicated its Chicago Cubs and White Sox telecasts to television stations in parts of the Midwestern U.S. (among them, WCEE [now Daystar owned-and-operated station WPXS] in East St. Louis, Illinois–St. Louis, Missouri, during its tenure as an independent station); select Bulls games aired by WGN and WCIU were also simulcast to many of these same stations and others within the team's designated market territory. All White Sox, Bulls and Cubs games televised on WCIU began to be syndicated to local stations in central Illinois and Iowa through the "WGN Sports Network" service beginning with each team's respective seasons in 2011.

With the conversion of WGN America into a traditional cable channel, WGN-TV chose to expand distribution of its Cubs, White Sox, Bulls and Blackhawks telecasts through syndication agreements with television stations in Illinois, Indiana and Iowa – primarily those affiliated with The CW and MyNetworkTV – that are within each team's designated market area (including sister stations WHO-DT [channel 13] in Des Moines and WQAD-TV [channel 8] in Moline, Illinois – respectively affiliated with NBC and ABC – which carried WGN's baseball telecasts on their respective Antenna TV- and MyNetworkTV-affiliated digital subchannels). Most notably, WISH-TV (channel 8) in Indianapolis reached agreements to carry the station's Cubs, White Sox and Blackhawks telecasts (as well as games from the former that were produced by WLS-TV) as part of its efforts to restore sports content to its lineup in the months following the loss of its CBS affiliation – ironically, to WGN-TV sister station WTTV (channel 4) and its Kokomo-based satellite WTTK (channel 29) – and its subsequent switch to The CW in January 2015. Some games also air on MyNetworkTV-affiliated sister WNDY-TV (channel 23) due to pre-emption limitations included in The CW's affiliation contracts that also forced WGN to defer some of its sports telecasts prior to its 2016 disaffiliation from that network. WISH and WNDY never carried Bulls telecasts due to the presence of the Indiana Pacers (whose games air locally on Fox Sports Indiana) and due to restrictions enforced by the NBA on regional broadcasts outside a team's designated territory.

=== Broadcast rights by station ===
Media market	State	Station	Chicago Cubs	Chicago White Sox	Chicago Bulls	Chicago Blackhawks
Springfield	Illinois	WCIA	—N/a	—N/a	Yes	—N/a
Springfield	Illinois	WCIX	—N/a	—N/a	Yes	—N/a
Decatur	Illinois	WAND	Yes	—N/a	—N/a	—N/a
Decatur	Illinois	WBUI	Yes	—N/a	—N/a	—N/a
Peoria–Bloomington	Illinois	WAOE	Yes	Yes	—N/a	Yes
Quincy	Illinois	WGEM	Yes	Yes	—N/a	—N/a
Rockford	Illinois	WTVO	—N/a	—N/a	Yes	—N/a
Rockford	Illinois	WIFR-TV	Yes	Yes	—N/a	Yes
Fort Wayne	Indiana	WANE-TV	—N/a	Yes	—N/a	—N/a
Fort Wayne	Indiana	WISE-TV	Yes	—N/a	—N/a	—N/a
Indianapolis	Indiana	WISH-TV	Yes	Yes	—N/a	Yes
Indianapolis	Indiana	WNDY-TV	Yes	Yes	—N/a	Yes
South Bend	Indiana	WSJV	—N/a	Yes	Yes	—N/a
South Bend	Indiana	WMYS-LD	Yes	—N/a	Yes	—N/a
Cedar Rapids	Iowa	KCRG-TV	Yes	Yes	—N/a	—N/a
Davenport	Iowa	WQAD-TV	Yes	Yes	—N/a	Yes
Des Moines	Iowa	WOI-DT	Yes	—N/a	—N/a	—N/a
Des Moines	Iowa	KDMI	—N/a	—N/a	—N/a	Yes
Des Moines	Iowa	KCWI	Yes	Yes	—N/a	—N/a

== Programs throughout the years ==
=== Former programs ===
- MLB baseball
  - Chicago Cubs (1948–2019)
  - Chicago White Sox (1948–1966; 1981; 1990–2019)
  - Baseball pre-game show: The Lead-Off Man (1948–2019)
  - Baseball post-game show: The Tenth Inning (1948–2019)
- NHL hockey
  - Chicago Blackhawks (1961–1975, away games only; 2008–2019)
- NBA basketball
  - Chicago Packers/Zephyrs (1961–1963)
  - Chicago Bulls (1966–1973; 1976–1985; 1989–2019)
  - Basketball pre-game/post-game show: BullsEye (1966–1973; 1976–1985; 1989–2019)
- NFL football
  - Chicago Bears football (1951, select regular season games via DuMont; 2010–2019, via occasional cable simulcasts during regular season and team syndication network for select preseason games)
  - Chicago Cardinals football (NFL; 1951, select regular season games via DuMont)
- MLS soccer
  - Chicago Fire FC (2020–2022)
- Thoroughbred horse racing
  - Illinois Derby (1948–1969; 1972–2015; 2017)
  - Hawthorne Gold Cup Handicap (1948–2015; 2017)
  - Arlington Million (1981–1997; 2000–2019, occasionally simulcast on WGN America when event is not nationally televised)
- International Association of Athletics Federations
  - Los Angeles Marathon (2017–2019; KTLA broadcast syndicated by WGN)
- Chicago Spurs (NPSL; 1967)
- Chicago Fire (World Football League; 1974)
- National Wrestling Alliance
  - Wrestling From Marigold (1949–1957; as a DuMont program until 1956)
- College basketball and football
  - DePaul Blue Demons (1948–1994)
  - Illinois Fighting Illini (1948–1994)
  - Loyola Ramblers (1948–1994)
  - Northwestern Wildcats (1948–1994)
  - Notre Dame Fighting Irish (1948–1994)
  - Big Ten Conference (1966–1991)
  - Chicago College All-Star Game (1948–1976)
  - Chicago Public High School League football (1958–1979)
- Little League Baseball tournament (1948–1964)

== On-air staff ==
=== Former ===
^{[D]} indicates former staffer is deceased.

- Jason Benetti – White Sox play-by-play announcer (2016–2018), home games; (2019), and Bulls fill-in announcer (2016–2019)
- Lou Boudreau – Cubs play-by-play announcer (1958–1959; 1961–1987)^{[D]}
- Bob Brenly – Cubs color analyst (2005–2012)
- Thom Brennaman – Cubs play-by-play announcer (1990–1995)
- Jack Brickhouse – Cubs, White Sox and Bulls play-by-play announcer (1948–1981)^{[D]}
- Lou Brock – White Sox studio analyst (1981)^{[D]}
- Lorn Brown – Bulls play-by-play announcer (1976–1978)^{[D]}
- Lisa Byington – Bulls fill-in announcer (2018–2019)
- Chip Caray – Cubs play-by-play announcer (1998–2004)
- Harry Caray – White Sox play-by-play announcer (1981); Cubs play-by-play announcer (1982–1997)^{[D]}
- Joe Carter – Cubs play-by-play announcer (2001–2002)
- Bob Costas – Bulls play-by-play announcer (1979–1980)
- Jim Deshaies – Cubs color analyst (2013–2019)
- Jack Drees – Illinois High School Basketball Tournament play-by-play announcer (1962–1968)^{[D]}
- Jim Durham – Bulls and White Sox play-by-play announcer (1985–1991)^{[D]}
- Jack Fleming – Bulls play-by-play announcer (1978–1979)^{[D]}
- Pat Foley – Blachawks play-by-play announcer (2008–2019)
- Neil Funk – Bulls play-by-play announcer (2008–2019)
- Johnny Gottselig – Blackhawks play-by-play announcer (1962–1963)^{[D]}
- Tony Graffanino – White Sox fill-in color analyst (road games; 2016–2019)
- Charlie Grimm – Cubs color commentator (1960)^{[D]}
- Milo Hamilton – Cubs, Zephyrs and Bulls play-by-play announcer (1955–1966; 1980–1984)^{[D]}
- Ken Harrelson – White Sox play-by-play announcer (1991–2018)
- Mike Huff – White Sox fill-in play-by-play announcer (road games; 2016–2019)
- Darrin Jackson – White Sox color commentator (2000–2008)
- Len Kasper – Cubs play-by-play announcer (2005–2019)
- Johnny "Red" Kerr – Bulls color analyst (1976–1998, 1999–2008)^{[D]}
- Stacey King – Bulls color analyst (2006–2019)
- Steve Konroyd – Blackhawks studio analyst and intermission post-game host (2008–2019)
- Wayne Larrivee – Bulls play-by-play announcer (1991–2008); Cubs fill-in play-by-play announcer (1994–1999)
- Josh Lewin – Cubs studio analyst (1997)
- Vince Lloyd – Cubs and Bulls color analyst (1954–1986)^{[D]}
- Joe McConnell – White Sox color commentator (1981)^{[D]}
- John Mengelt – Bulls and Blue Demons color analyst (1982–1985)
- Tony Meola – Fire color analyst (2020–2022)
- Keith Moreland – Cubs fill-in analyst (2005–2010)
- Troy Murray – Blackhawks studio analyst (2008–2010)
- Dave Nelson – Cubs studio analyst (1988–1989)
- Eddie Olczyk – Blackhawks color commentator (2008–2019); occasional horse racing analyst (2008–2019)
- Tom Paciorek – White Sox color commentator (1990–1999)
- John Paxson – Bulls color analyst (1998–1999)
- Lloyd Pettit – Cubs and White Sox color commentator; Blackhawks play-by-play announcer/color commentator (1961–1970)^{[D]}
- Jimmy Piersall – White Sox color commentator (1981)^{[D]}
- Dan Roan – Cubs fill-in play-by-play announcer (2005; 2019); Horse racing host
- Denis Savard – Blackhawks studio analyst (2010–2014)
- Dewayne Staats – Cubs analyst (1985–1989)
- Steve Stone – Cubs color analyst (1983–2000; 2003–2004); White Sox color commentator (2009–2019)
- Chuck Swirsky – White Sox play-by-play announcer (road games; 2016–2019)
- Tyler Terens – Fire fill-in play-by-play announcer/sideline reporter (2020–2022)
- Arlo White – Fire play-by-play announcer (2021–2022)
- Bert Wilson – Cubs color commentator (1948–1955)^{[D]}
