= List of Chicago Bulls broadcasters =

Broadcasters for the Chicago Bulls National Basketball Association team.

== Television ==
=== Play-by-play ===
- Jack Brickhouse: 1966–1973 (WGN-TV)
- Andy Musser: 1973–1976 (WSNS)
- Lorn Brown: 1976–1978 (WGN-TV)
- Jack Fleming: 1978–1979 (WGN-TV)
- Bob Costas: 1979–1980 (WGN-TV)
- Milo Hamilton: 1980–1985 (WGN-TV)
- Joe Tait: 1982–1983 (Sportsvision Chicago)
- Bill Hazen: 1983–1985 (Sportsvision Chicago)
- Jim Durham: 1985–1991 (Sportsvision/SportsChannel Chicago, WFLD, WGN-TV)
- Wayne Larrivee: 1991–2008 (WGN-TV, WCIU-TV)
- Tom Dore: 1991–2008 (SportsChannel/Fox Sports Net/NBC Sports Chicago)
- Neil Funk: 2008–2020, 2025 (NBC Sports Chicago, WGN-TV, WCIU-TV, WPWR-TV)
- Adam Amin: 2020–present (Chicago Sports Network, NBC Sports Chicago)

=== Color analysts ===
- Vince Lloyd: 1966–1973 (WGN-TV)
- Dick Gonski: 1973–1975 (WSNS-TV)
- Lorn Brown: 1975–1976 (WSNS-TV)
- Johnny “Red” Kerr: 1975–1998, 1999–2008 (Sportsvision/SportsChannel/Fox Sports Net/Comcast SportNet Chicago, WGN-TV, WCIU)
- John Mengelt: 1982–1985 (WGN-TV)
- John Paxson: 1998–1999 (Fox Sports Net Chicago, WGN-TV)
- Stacey King: 2006–2026 (Chicago Sports Network, NBC Sports Chicago, WGN-TV, WCIU-TV, WPWR-TV)

=== Broadcast outlets ===
- WGN-TV (1966–1973, 1976–1985, 1989–2019)
  - WGN America (1978–1985; 1989–2014)†
- WSNS-TV (1973–1976)
- WFLD (1985–1989)
- WCIU-TV (1999–2014)
- WPWR-TV (2014–2019)
- ONTV/Sportsvision/SportsChannel Chicago/FSN Chicago (1982–2004)
- Comcast SportsNet Chicago/NBC Sports Chicago (2004–2024)
- Chicago Sports Network (2024–present)

†: from 1999 to 2014, WGN America only simulcast approximately half of WGN-TV's annual Bulls schedule.

== Radio ==
=== Play-by-play ===
- Lou Boudreau: 1966–1968 (WGN)
- Vince Lloyd: 1968–1970 (WGN)
- Jack Fleming:1970–1973 (WIND)
- Jim Durham: 1973–1991 (WIND, WVON, WGCI, WMAQ, WLUP)
- John Rooney: 1989–1991 (WLUP)
- Neil Funk: 1991–2008 (WMAQ, WMVP, WCKG)
- Chuck Swirsky: 2008–present (WMVP, WLS, WSCR)

=== Color analysts ===
- Vince Lloyd: 1966–1968 (WGN)
- Roy Leonard: 1968–1970 (WGN)
- Bill Berg: 1970–1980 (WIND)
- Norm Van Lier: 1980–1982 (WVON, WGCI-FM)
- Dave Baum: 1982–1985 (WIND)
- Johnny “Red” Kerr: 1985–1991, 1998–1999 (WMAQ, WMVP)
- Junior Bridgeman: 1989-1990 (WLUP)
- Bob Love: 1989–1990 (WLUP)
- Tom Boerwinkle: 1990–1994 (WLUP, WMAQ)
- Adam Howes: Game 6, 1993 Finals
- John Paxson: 1994–1995, 1999–2003 (WMAQ, WMVP)
- Harvey Catchings: 1995–1996 (WMAQ)
- Derrek Dickey: 1996–1999 (WMVP)
- Bill Wennington: 2003–Present (WMVP, WCKG, WLS, WSCR)

=== Broadcast outlets ===
- WGN (1966–1970)
- WIND (1970–1980, 1982–1985)
- WVON (1980–1981)
- WGCI-FM (1981–1982)
- WMAQ (1985–1988, 1991–1996)
- WLUP (1988–1991)
- WMVP (1996–2006, 2007–2016)
- WCKG (2006–2007)
- WLS (2016–2018)
- WSCR (2018–Present)

== Spanish radio ==
=== Play-by-play ===
- John Morales: 1991–1992 (WTAQ)
- Hector Molina: 1992–1999 (WIND)
- Omar Ramos: 2009–2024 (WRTO)
- Miguel Esparza: 2024–Present (WRTO)

=== Color analysts ===
- Christian Ramos: 1991–1992 (WTAQ)
- Hector Lozano: 1992–1999 (WIND)
- Ozzie Guillén Jr: 2009–2011 (WRTO)
- Elio Benitez: 2022–Present (WRTO)
- Miguel Esparza: 2023–2024 (WRTO)

=== Broadcast outlets ===
- WTAQ (1991–1992)
- WIND (1992–1999)
- WRTO (2009–Present)

== See also ==
- List of current National Basketball Association broadcasters
- List of Chicago Bears broadcasters
- List of Chicago Blackhawks broadcasters
- List of Chicago Cubs broadcasters
- List of Chicago White Sox broadcasters
