= Mary Shane =

American baseball broadcaster (1945–1987)

- Born: May 17, 1945; Milwaukee, Wisconsin, U.S.
- Died: November 1, 1987 (aged 42); Worcester, Massachusetts, U.S.

Mary Shane (May 17, 1945 – November 1, 1987) was the first full-time female play by play broadcaster for a Major League Baseball team in 1977.

She was born Mary Driscoll in Milwaukee, Wisconsin, the daughter of a former semi-pro baseball player. In 1967, she graduated from the University of Wisconsin at Madison with a B.A. in History. After college she became a history teacher at a Milwaukee high school for six years. In 1975, she decided for a career change and became a radio sportscaster at WRIT in Milwaukee, where she covered the Brewers, the Bucks and the Marquette Warriors.

In 1976, while working in the County Stadium press box for a White Sox - Brewers game, White Sox announcer Harry Caray was surprised to see a young woman in the press box and invited her to do some play-by-play. Shane did well enough that he asked her to join the broadcast the next day and again on a subsequent White Sox visit to County Stadium.

In, 1977, WMAQ radio and WSNS-TV, the flagship stations for the Chicago White Sox, hired her to join the broadcast team which already included Caray, Lorn Brown and Jimmy Piersall. However, Shane was pulled from the White Sox Broadcasts before the 1977 season concluded and her contract was not renewed. While her voice was an issue, Mary distinguished herself as a hard worker. Broadcasting partner Jimmy Piersall stated: “She never had a chance. Even a bad baseball player gets at least one full season to see if he’ll come around. But because of all the in-bred prejudice against a woman covering a baseball team, Mary didn’t even get that. It was a real shame, because I thought she had what it takes to make it. Someday, the idea of a woman bringing a woman’s perspective to baseball broadcasting will be a tremendous innovation somewhere.”

In the 1980s, Shane worked in Worcester, Massachusetts as sportswriter for the Worcester Telegram, becoming the first female reporter to regularly cover the Boston Celtics, winning an award for her writing. In her thirties, she became plagued by heart troubles and on November 1, 1987 at age 42 she died of a heart attack at her home in Worcester.
