= Rich King (sportscaster) =

American sports journalist (born 1947)

Rich King (born 1947 in Chicago, Illinois) is an American sports journalist who worked for CW affiliate and national cable superstation WGN-TV in Chicago, Illinois. He served as sports anchor for the station's 9 p.m. newscast on Saturday and Sunday evenings, and filed sports reports for the station's Sunday through Thursday evening newscasts. He retired on June 15, 2016, after 48 years in the business.

== Career ==
King was born and raised on the South Side of Chicago, near Comiskey Park. He attended the De La Salle Institute and is a graduate of the University of Illinois at Chicago.

King started his broadcast career in 1968 as an intern for WGN, who hired him as a writer and producer the following year. In 1970, Rich moved to radio station WBBM (AM) as a writer and producer, before becoming the assistant news director and managing editor two years later in 1972. In 1974, King became an on-air sportscaster along with being a color commentator and play-by-play announcer for the Chicago White Sox baseball club for the 1980 and 1981 seasons. In January 1985, he was promoted to sports director at WBBM radio and remained in that position until he joined CBS owned-and-operated station WBBM-TV. King returned to WGN-TV in an on-camera position as a sports reporter and anchor in August 1991. After a 1994 reader poll, the Chicago Sun-Times reported that viewers appreciated the "down-to-earth, no-hype styles" of King and his fellow WGN sports anchor Dan Roan.

== Other work ==
King has served on the Board of Directors for the Chicago Lighthouse for the Blind and the communications committee of the American Cancer Society.

=== "My Maggie" ===
King also authored a novel entitled My Maggie, which was published in October 2007 under King Books. The book centers on the story of King's late wife and childhood sweetheart Maggie Smith, who was diagnosed with hearing loss at the age of four, and whom he referred to as "an awkward tomboy with hearing aid wires tangled in her dress at the play lot" and later "a blossoming beauty." King and Smith married in 1970; they and were married for 32 years until she died as a result of cancer in 2002, after having fought the disease two previous times. 75% of royalties from the book went to the American Cancer Society and the Chicago Lighthouse for the Blind.

== Back in the Game ==
In 2015, King's second book, Back in the Game, was published by Eckhartz Press. The book is about his second wife and life after Maggie.

== Awards and recognition ==
King was recognized for his achievement in sportscasting. In 1989, he had the highest approval rating (75%) among local television and radio sports reporters in a Chicago Sun-Times readers poll. He was named "Sportscaster of the Year" by the Illinois Broadcasters Association in 1991. He also won awards from the Illinois chapters of the Associated Press and United Press International for his sportscasts. In 1998, King was honored with a Regional Emmy for his coverage of the Chicago Bulls basketball team.
