= Bob Elson =

Pioneering American baseball radio broadcaster (1904–1981)

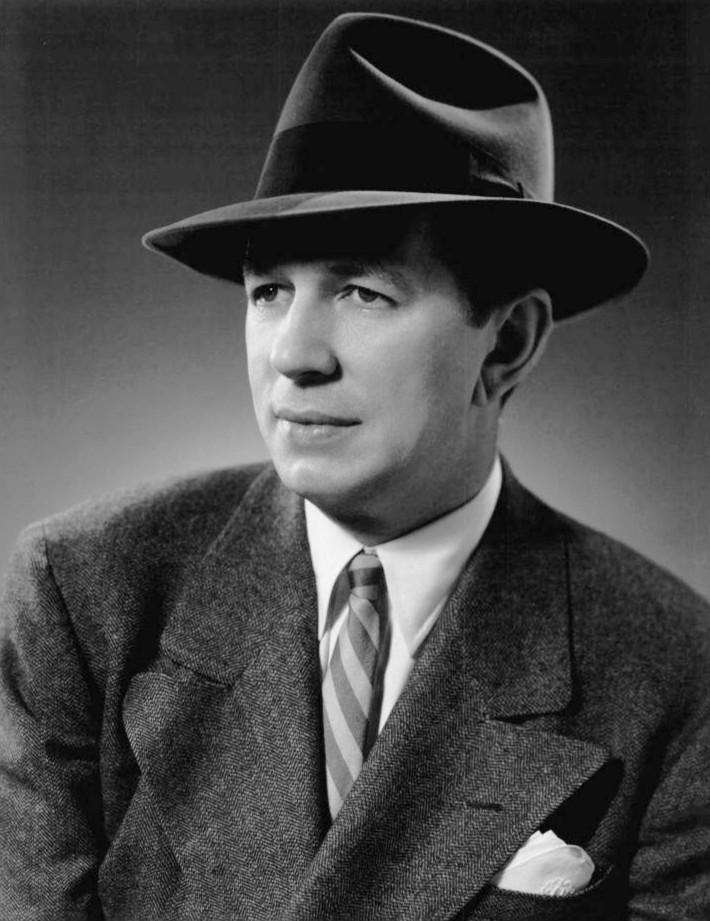
- Born: Robert Arthur Elson; March 22, 1904; Chicago, Illinois, U.S.
- Died: March 10, 1981 (aged 76); Chicago, Illinois, U.S.
- Sports commentary career
- Teams: Chicago White Sox (1931–42 and 1946–70); Chicago Cubs (1931–42); Chicago Bears (1933–36); Chicago Cardinals (1933–36); Chicago Black Hawks (1934–40, 1945–55, 1972–75); Oakland Athletics (1971)
- Genre: Play-by-play
- Sports: Major League Baseball; National Football League; National Hockey League

Robert Arthur Elson (March 22, 1904 – March 10, 1981) was a pioneering American sportscaster and the radio voice of Major League Baseball's Chicago White Sox for the better part of four decades. Known as "The 'Ol Commander", Elson broadcast an estimated 5,000 major league games. In his prime, was among the leading play-by-play men in the sport. In 1979, he received the Ford C. Frick Award from the National Baseball Hall of Fame for his excellence and longevity in the industry.

== Early life and career ==
Born in Chicago, Elson broke into the broadcasting industry by accident. While vacationing in St. Louis in 1928, he took a tour of radio station KWK. A receptionist saw him among 40 men in line for an audition, and thought he was going to audition as well. He became a finalist, and was hired after a vote by listeners. A few days later, officials at Chicago's WGN heard about Elson's victory and wondered what a Chicago native was doing broadcasting for a St. Louis station. They quickly hired him.

In 1931, Elson began calling all home games of the Chicago Cubs and Chicago White Sox. Such double duty would be impossible today, but in those days the Cubs and White Sox almost never played at home on the same day. They, like most teams, "re-created" away games in the studio using telegraphed messages from the ballpark rather than sending their broadcasting crew out on the road, to save money. Nationally, Elson called numerous World Series and All-Star Games in the 1930s and 1940s, most often teaming with Red Barber on Mutual radio.

Elson called radio broadcasts of Chicago Black Hawks hockey from 1934 to 1940 and again from 1945 to 1955, and Chicago Bears and Chicago Cardinals football from 1933 to 1936. He also called national broadcasts of pro and college football for Mutual radio in the 1930s and 1940s. An article in the December 1940 issue of Radio and Television Mirror identified Elson as the top football announcer for the network.

In 1942, Elson enlisted in the United States Navy and served for four years in World War II, a stint that earned him the nickname "The Ol' Commander." None other than President and Commander-in-Chief Franklin D. Roosevelt had him brought home to announce the 1943 World Series. When Major League Baseball began making annual films of the Fall Classic in 1943, Elson was chosen to narrate them, a role he filled through the 1948 campaign.

== Later career ==
For 25 seasons (1946–70), Elson broadcast for the White Sox exclusively. He called Oakland Athletics games in 1971 before returning to Chicago, where he teamed with Lloyd Pettit on Black Hawks radio broadcasts from 1972 to 1975.

== 1959 World Series ==
Despite his long association with the White Sox, Elson was bypassed by NBC for a role on its national television broadcasts of the 1959 World Series, which was the team's first Fall Classic since 1919 and would have been Elson's first since 1943. NBC Sports president Tom Gallery, who had grown up with Elson in Chicago, was not enamored of his style and selected Sox television announcer Jack Brickhouse instead. Elson re-created the series over White Sox radio flagship WCFL.

== Broadcast style ==
Elson was often described as "relaxed" on the air, not easily succumbing to emotion or hyperbole. Yet he left enough room for emotion while describing dramatic plays favorable to the home team. He was one of the first broadcasters to do on-field interviews. In later years, he felt uncomfortable with announcers who frequently criticized on-field performances, having grown up in an era when sportscasters frequently hung out with players and managers after games.

Elson's style inspired that of several other baseball broadcasters who grew up in the Midwest, a list that included the Cubs' Jack Brickhouse, Bert Wilson, Gene Elston, Jack Quinlan, and Milo Hamilton (who was Elson's partner with the White Sox from 1961 to 1965), the St. Louis Cardinals' Harry Caray (who succeeded Elson in the White Sox' booth in 1971), the Philadelphia Phillies' Harry Kalas, the Milwaukee Brewers' Bob Uecker, and the Seattle Mariners' Dave Niehaus.

== Non-sports career ==
Elson's broadcasting achievements went beyond sports. His broadcasts from Chicago's The Pump Room restaurant brought him recognition as "the interviewer who drew secrets from celebrities in all fields." For five years, he also did Bob Elson on Board the Century, which (in contrast to the title) he broadcast from LaSalle Street Station in Chicago. Elson caught celebrities for spontaneous interviews while they were in the station. In a similar vein, he did Bob Elson on the Flagships on KNX, interviewing people who were traveling on American Airlines.

Elson was co-host of An Hour With Elson and Anson, a daily variety program that began October 13, 1941, on WGN.

== Later years ==
Elson's wife, Jeanne, died in 1975. Six years later, he died at 76 years of age as a result of a heart ailment. He had three children, a son and two daughters.
