= Harry Creighton =

American sportscaster (1911–1986)

- Born: Harry Penberthy Creighton; March 19, 1911; Chicago Heights, Illinois, U.S.
- Died: November 25, 1986 (aged 75); Harvey, Illinois, U.S.
- Sports commentary career
- Teams: Chicago White Sox (1949–1956); Chicago Cubs (1949–1956)
- Sports: Major League Baseball; College football

Harry Penberthy Creighton (March 18, 1911 – November 25, 1986) was an American sportscaster who called Chicago Cubs and Chicago White Sox games for WGN-TV from 1949 to 1956.

== Biography ==
Creighton was born in Chicago Heights, Illinois and worked as a teller at the First National Bank of Chicago before he entered broadcasting. He began his career in 1932 at WAAF. In 1936, he took over the station's Sports Shorts so its host could focus on other duties. In 1942, he moved to WHBF in Rock Island, Illinois. That fall, he entered the United States Army at Fort Sheridan. He was honorably discharged due to injury in early 1943 and returned to WHBF.

In 1943, Creighton joined WGN as a sports and special events announcer. He covered college football, Golden Gloves boxing, and the Chicago Charities College All-Star Game for the station and appeared on many dramatic, musical, and variety shows for WGN and Mutual Broadcasting System. In 1949, he joined WGN-TV as a staff announcer and sidekick to Jack Brickhouse on the station's Cubs and White Sox broadcasts. Covering over 1,200 baseball games, Creighton reportedly "became more familiar to the Chicago public than the mayor", according to the Chicago Tribune.

Creighton left broadcasting in 1957 to become a beer distributor. He later worked as an executive for Canteen Corp. He retired in 1970 and spent his later years in Flossmoor, Illinois. He died on November 25, 1986, at Ingalls Memorial Hospital in Harvey, Illinois.
