= Bob Hawk =

American radio personality (1907–1989)

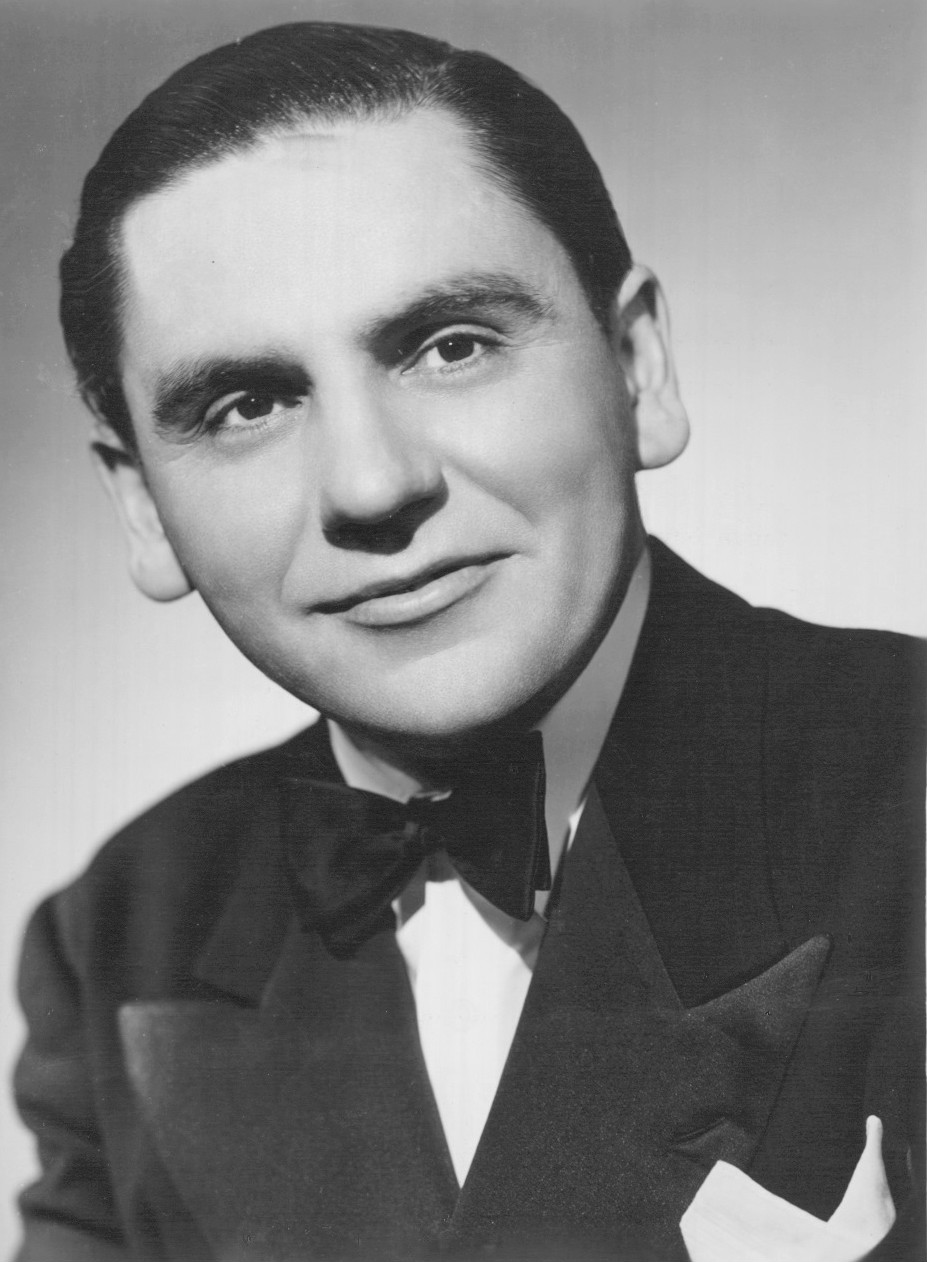
- In 1942
- Born: December 15, 1907; Creston, Iowa, U.S.
- Died: July 14, 1989 (aged 81); Laguna Hills, California, U.S.
- Occupation: Radio personality

Bob Hawk (December 15, 1907 – July 4, 1989) was an American radio quizmaster and comic whose early work in radio set the standard for the "man in the street” interviews.

== Early years ==
Born in Creston, Iowa, Hawk began his career by reading poetry on the radio in Chicago.

Hawk's mother was in part responsible for her son's eventual rise in broadcasting. When he won an elocution contest at the age of nine, Marietta Hawk had big dreams for her son. She worked with him in poetry and dramatic reading as well as oration. Before he was a high school graduate, his mother had entered him in 20 state and local competitions; young Hawk won 19 of them.

== Career ==
Hawk was one of the first people to use a disc jockey format on radio when, in 1927, he began making jokes, commenting about records, and interviewing performers on the air at a station in Chicago. The approach became popular with listeners, resulting in more time on the air for him and a nine-year tenure at the station.

Camel cigarettes sponsored several of his radio programs, including The Bob Hawk Show, a popular quiz show of the late 1940s and early 1950s.

His programs included:

- Chicago Cubs and Chicago White Sox baseball games for WCFL (1932)
- Foolish Questions (1936)
- Fun Quiz (1936)
- Quixie Doodles (1938) for the Mutual Broadcasting System
- Name Three (1939–1940) for Mutual, sponsored by Philip Morris
- Take It or Leave It (1940–1941) for CBS, sponsored by Eversharp
- How’m I Doin’? for CBS, sponsored by Camel
- Thanks to the Yanks (1942–1945) CBS, sponsored by Camel
- The Bob Hawk Show for CBS, sponsored by Camel

In 1949, The Bob Hawk Show moved to Hollywood from Chicago, then a central broadcasting hub with 22 radio stations. During its last years on the air, the program was recorded and edited down to 30 minutes. Hawk wrote the questions for his quiz programs, and he often devised clever ones. One such trick question: "Could a baseball game end in a six-six tie without a man touching first base?" Answer: "Yes, if the game was played between two girl teams."

Hawk failed to make the move to television, and in 1952, he was quoted in Time: "Why should I beat my brains out in TV when radio is paying so well?" At the time his radio show was consistently rated in the top 12 radio shows nationally.

== Death ==
Hawk died in Laguna Hills, California on July 4, 1989.

== Recognition ==
His star on the Hollywood Walk of Fame for radio is in the 6400 block of Hollywood Boulevard on the north side of the street'
