= Jack Fleming =

American sports announcer (1923–2001)

- Born: February 4, 1924; Morgantown, West Virginia, U.S.
- Died: January 3, 2001 (aged 76); Pittsburgh, Pennsylvania, U.S.
- Occupation: Sportscaster
- Years active: 1947–1996

Leo W. "Jack" Fleming Jr. (February 3, 1924 – January 3, 2001) was an American sports announcer for the National Football League (NFL)'s Pittsburgh Steelers and the National Basketball Association (NBA)'s Chicago Bulls in professional sports, and also the West Virginia Mountaineers football and basketball teams. One of his most famous calls was for the Steelers in 1972, on the "Immaculate Reception".

== Early life ==
Leo W. Fleming was born on February 3, 1924. He was a United States Air Force navigator during World War II. He flew 23 combat missions and began his radio career while recuperating at Ashford Military Hospital.

== Announcing career ==
=== West Virginia University ===
Jack Fleming, also known as the "Voice of the Mountaineers", served as the school's football and basketball announcer during the periods 1947–1959, 1962–1969, and 1974–1996. Some of Fleming's more memorable calls include calls on Rod Thorn, Major Harris, Jeff Hostetler, Will Drewery, the infamous "Flutie Sack" in 1984, Pat Randolph, Robert Walker's game-winning touchdown run against Miami in 1993, Ed Hill's game-winning touchdown catch against Boston College in 1993, and Amos Zereoué.

Fleming was a seven-time West Virginia sportscaster of the year winner, also receiving the 1996 Gene Morehouse Award from the West Virginia Sports Writers Association and the Chris Schenkel Award from the College Football Hall of Fame in 1999. In 1995, he was inducted into West Virginia University's Order of Vandalia, for outstanding service to the state and school.

Fleming was inducted into the West Virginia University Sports Hall of Fame in 2001.

=== Professional teams ===
Fleming also was the sports announcer for the Pittsburgh Steelers (1965–1993) of the NFL and the Chicago Bulls (1970–1973; 1978–1979) of the NBA. Fleming broadcast four Super Bowls, seven AFC Championship Games and an NBA All-Star Game during his tenure with both teams.

His most memorable call was in 1972 on the Steelers' "Immaculate Reception":

Hang onto your hats, here come the Steelers out of the huddle. Terry Bradshaw at the controls. Twenty-two seconds remaining. And this crowd is standing. And Bradshaw, back and looking again Bradshaw....running out of the pocket, looking for somebody to throw to, fires it downfield, and there's a collision! It's caught out of the air! The ball is pulled in by Franco Harris! Harris is going for a touchdown for Pittsburgh! Harris is going...5 seconds left on the clock. Franco Harris pulled in the football, I don't even know where he came from!
