= Len Kasper =

American sportscaster

- Education: Marquette University, '93; Public Relations
- Occupation: Sports broadcaster
- Years active: 1994–present
- Spouse: Pam
- Children: 1

Len Kasper is an American sportscaster. Since 2021, he has been the radio play-by-play announcer for the Chicago White Sox of Major League Baseball, teaming with color analyst Darrin Jackson on ESPN 1000 and the Chicago White Sox Radio Network.

From 2005 to 2020, Kasper worked alongside analysts Bob Brenly and Jim Deshaies on Chicago Cubs telecasts. He also joined the team's radio network for the fifth inning of games that were televised nationally (including playoff games), working with regular radio announcers Pat Hughes and Ron Coomer.

== Career ==
Kasper first worked for WTMJ-AM (620) from 1994 to 2002 in Milwaukee as the host of the station's daily sports show, hosted pregame and halftime shows for the Green Bay Packers, and was a co-host on a hot stove league show on the Brewers' radio network. After realizing he would need experience calling baseball games, he started working with Brett Dolan on the weekends in the late 1990s calling several innings at a time for the Beloit Snappers. In 1999, he was then asked to do fill-in TV work with the Milwaukee Brewers for Matt Vasgersian who started to get work on the national stage. Kasper continued to work alongside Bill Schroeder as a fill-in for Vasgersian on Brewers telecasts through 2001.

In 2002, Kasper was hired as a full-time TV play-by-play announcer to work alongside color commentator Tommy Hutton for the Florida Marlins and worked for Florida through the 2004 season until being hired for the Cubs in 2005. Kasper received the Harry Caray Sportscaster of the Year Award from the Pitch and Hit Club of Chicago in 2011.

On Friday, December 4, 2020, it was announced that he would be leaving the Chicago Cubs TV broadcasting booth to become the primary radio play-by-play announcer for the Chicago White Sox on WMVP 1000 AM and fill-in TV announcer on NBC Sports Chicago. He was replaced by Jon Sciambi.

Kasper founded and is the bass player for the band Sonic45. Sonic45 is a Chicago-based new wave band who have released two records "Space and Time" in 2021 and "SuperSonic" in 2024.

== Personal life ==
Kasper grew up in Michigan. His broadcasting influence was the Detroit Tigers' radio broadcasters, Ernie Harwell and Paul Carey. He graduated from Shepherd High School. He graduated summa cum laude from Marquette University with a degree in public relations in 1993.

Preceded by Chip Caray	Chicago Cubs Television Play-By-Play Announcer; 2005–2020	Succeeded by Jon Sciambi
