= Pat Flanagan (sportscaster) =

American sports broadcaster

- Flanagan in a publicity photo
- Born: Charles Carroll Flanagan; April 11, 1893; Clinton, Iowa, U.S.
- Died: July 2, 1963 (aged 70); Scottsdale, Arizona, U.S.
- Education: Grinnell College; Palmer College of Chiropractic
- Occupation: Broadcaster
- Spouse: Hazel Elinor Rieman

Charles Carroll "Pat" Flanagan (April 11, 1893 – July 2, 1963) was a play-by-play broadcaster for Major League Baseball's Chicago Cubs from 1929 to 1943.

== Biography ==
Flanagan was born in 1893 in Clinton, Iowa; graduated in 1913 from Grinnell College in Grinnell, Iowa; and later studied at the Palmer College of Chiropractic in Davenport, Iowa, during the 1920s. After college, he worked in Fond du Lac, Wisconsin, and Chicago. He served with the medical detachment of the 33rd Infantry Division during World War I.

Flanagan first broadcast sports for WOC in Davenport in 1921, getting his start as a fill-in announcer. He joined WBBM in Chicago in 1927, and became their first baseball announcer. He served as the radio announcer of Chicago Cubs games from 1929 to 1943, and also announced Chicago White Sox games. While home games in Chicago were broadcast live, Flanagan recreated the play-by-play for road games from reports transmitted by ticker tape.

In 1933, Flanagan served as radio announcer for the first Major League Baseball All-Star Game, held at Comiskey Park. He also did the play-by-play for three World Series (1932, 1934, and 1938) for CBS Radio. In his final season of announcing for the Cubs, 1943, he was assisted by Bert Wilson, who took over the lead role in 1944.

Flanagan died in 1963 in Scottsdale, Arizona. At the time of his death, he was the sports director for KOOL in Phoenix, Arizona. Flanagan has twice been a finalist for the Ford C. Frick Award, presented by the National Baseball Hall of Fame.
