= Hal Totten =

American sportscaster (1901–1985)

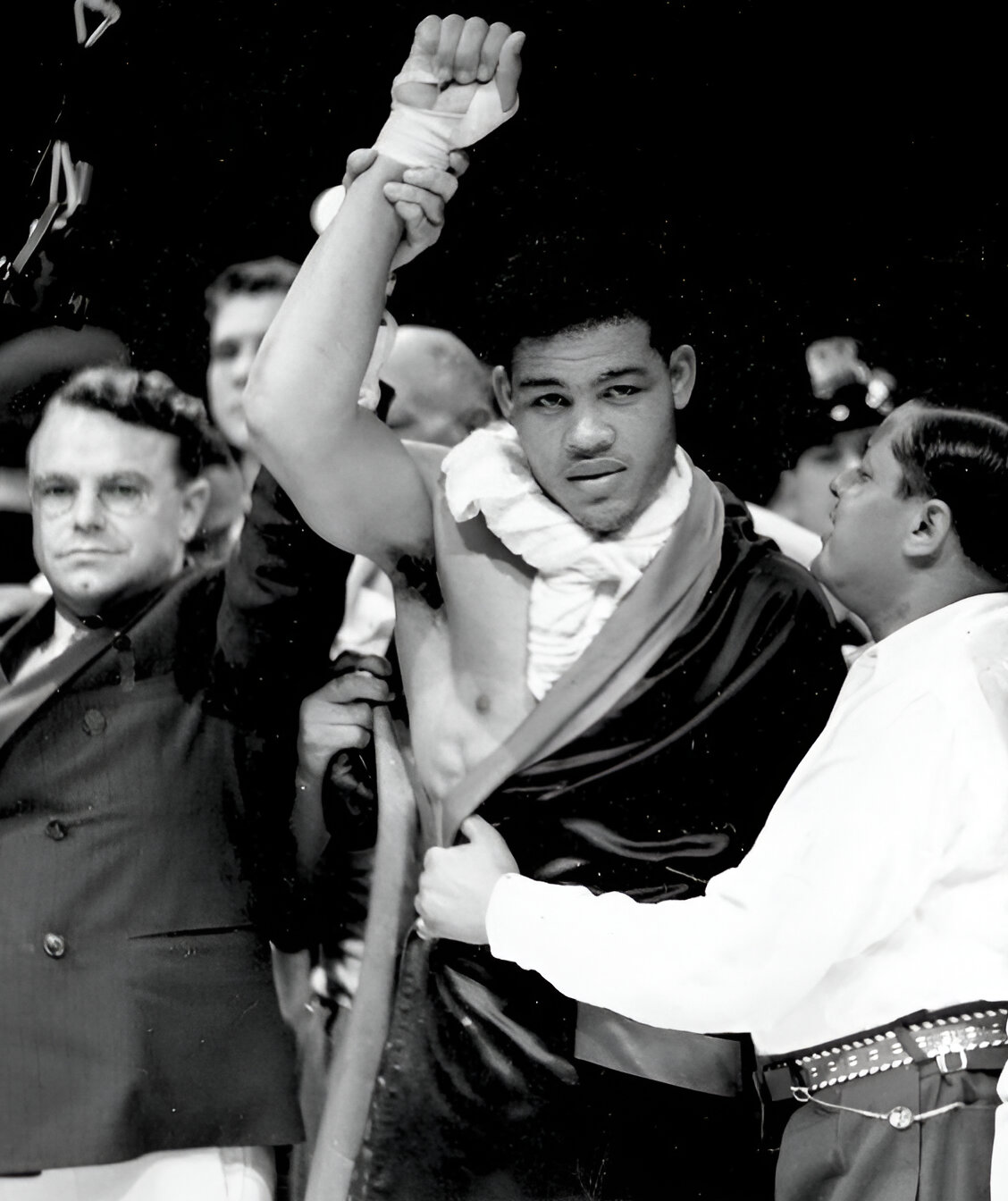
Totten (left) raising the hand of Joe Louis after his victory over Jim Braddock on June 22, 1937

Harold Osborn Totten (July 28, 1901 – April 5, 1985) was an American sportscaster from Chicago who called Major League Baseball games from 1924 to 1950.

== Early life ==
Totten was born on July 28, 1901, in Newark, New Jersey. He attended public school in Ithaca, New York, from 1906 to 1912, when his family moved to Chicago. After graduating from Nicholas Senn High School, Totten attended Northwestern University, where he played baseball and was the sports editor of The Daily Northwestern. While at Northwestern, Totten also served as a college correspondent for the Chicago Daily Journal and the Associated Press. He worked for the Journal in various roles from 1922 to 1924, including a year-long stint covering the criminal court. His coverage of the Leopold and Loeb trial led to him getting a job as a Rewrite man with the Chicago Daily News.

== Broadcasting ==
In 1924, Totten joined the Daily News-owned WMAQ as a sports broadcaster. On April 23, 1924, Totten called the first radio broadcast of a Major League Baseball game in Chicago, a 12–1 victory of the Chicago Cubs over the St. Louis Cardinals. In 1925 he became the first regular baseball announcer when WMAQ began regularly broadcasting Cub home games. In 1926, Totten began calling Chicago White Sox games as well. In 1933, Totten became the first person to call the Major League Baseball All-Star Game. He is also credited as the first announcer to conduct on-field interviews. In additional to baseball, Totten also called Chicago Maroons football and boxing, including the 1927 Jack Dempsey-Gene Tunney Long Count Fight. In 1945, Totten, then working for WGN, was reassigned to farm reporter. He also served as a backup announcer for Mutual's Game of the Day. In 1950, he left Chicago for Keokuk, Iowa, where he took over management of KOKX.

== Later life ==
From 1951 to 1960, Totten served as president of the Three-I League. He then served as president of the Southern Association until its demise in 1961.

Totten died on April 5, 1985, in Fort Myers, Florida. He was survived by a son, John Totten, who was the longtime public address announcer for Indianapolis Motor Speedway, and twin daughters, Barbara Totten Sales and Joyce Totten Apitz. In 2004, 2016, and 2022, Totten was a finalist for the National Baseball Hall of Fame's Ford C. Frick Award.
