= Vince Lloyd =

American sports announcer (1917–2003)

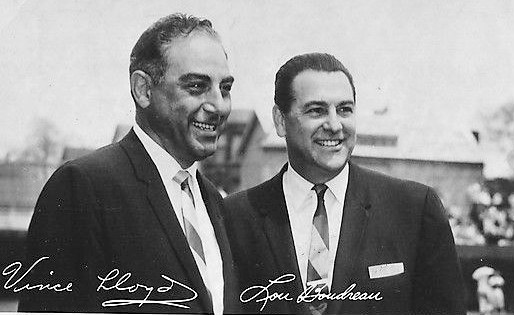
Vince Lloyd and Lou Boudreau as WGN broadcasters in 1965.

Vince Lloyd Skaff (June 1, 1917 – July 3, 2003), who worked under the name Vince Lloyd, was a radio announcer for Major League Baseball's Chicago Cubs for over 30 years. He also was the first radio voice in Chicago Bulls history.

Lloyd was born in Beresford, South Dakota, and after graduating from Yankton College in 1940 started his career with a number of local radio stations around the Midwest. He served in the U.S. Marine Corps during World War II.

During the 1950s, Lloyd was the sidekick to Jack Brickhouse on Cubs and Chicago White Sox television broadcasts, during a time when WGN-TV covered both teams' home games and selected road games. When Cubs radio play-by-play man Jack Quinlan died in an auto accident during spring training, in 1965, Lloyd was promoted to that position and Lloyd Pettit was brought in to back up Brickhouse.

Lloyd then began a more than 20-year radio run partnered with Hall of Fame shortstop Lou Boudreau.

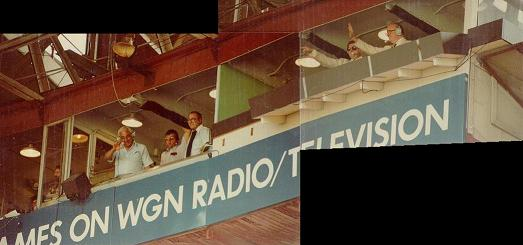
Cubs broadcasters, June 11, 1981 – Vince Lloyd, Lou Boudreau, Milo Hamilton, Jack Brickhouse

Various announcers have punctuated particularly exciting moments during a game with the exclamation "Holy..." something: Harry Caray and Phil Rizzuto invoked "Holy cow!" Milo Hamilton's was "Holy Toledo!" For a while, Lloyd was known for "Holy mackerel!" During the 1970s, a fan sent the broadcasting team a cowbell, and when a Cubs player would hit a home run, Lloyd and Boudreau would ring the bell as Lloyd proclaimed, "It's a bell-ringer!"

Vince Lloyd was also the first baseball announcer to interview a current US president on TV, when he spoke to John F. Kennedy during the White Sox TV pre-game show for the traditional Washington, D.C. season opener, at Griffith Stadium on April 10, 1961.

In the 1966–67 season, Lloyd teamed with Boudreau on Bulls' broadcasts for WGN Radio. He also was the voice of the Chicago Bears, Chicago Fire and Big Ten football and pro wrestling.

Lloyd died of stomach cancer on July 3, 2003, in Green Valley, Arizona. In 2026, he was inducted into the Cubs Hall of Fame.
