= Darrin Jackson =

American baseball player (born 1963)

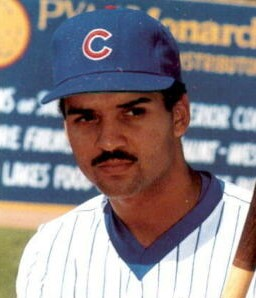
- Jackson with the Cubs in 1987
- Outfielder
- Born: August 22, 1963 (age 62); Los Angeles, California, U.S.
- Batted: Right Threw: Right

Professional debut
- MLB: June 17, 1985, for the Chicago Cubs
- NPB: April 1, 1995, for the Seibu Lions

Last appearance
- NPB: October 5, 1996, for the Seibu Lions
- MLB: October 3, 1999, for the Chicago White Sox

MLB statistics
- Batting average: .257
- Home runs: 80
- Runs batted in: 317

NPB statistics
- Batting average: .277
- Home runs: 39
- Runs batted in: 132
- Stats at Baseball Reference

Teams
- Chicago Cubs (1985, 1987–1989); San Diego Padres (1989–1992); Toronto Blue Jays (1993); New York Mets (1993); Chicago White Sox (1994); Seibu Lions (1995–1996); Minnesota Twins (1997); Milwaukee Brewers (1997–1998); Chicago White Sox (1999)

Career highlights and awards
- Best Nine Award (1995)

Darrin Jay Jackson (born August 22, 1963) is an American former Major League Baseball center fielder. He played 12 years for the Chicago Cubs (1985–1989), San Diego Padres (1989–1992), Toronto Blue Jays (1993), New York Mets (1993), Chicago White Sox (1994, 1999), Minnesota Twins (1997) and Milwaukee Brewers (1997–1998). He also played for the Seibu Lions in Japan (1995–1996). He is the current radio color analyst for the Chicago White Sox.
