= Jack Brickhouse =

American sportscaster (1916–1998)

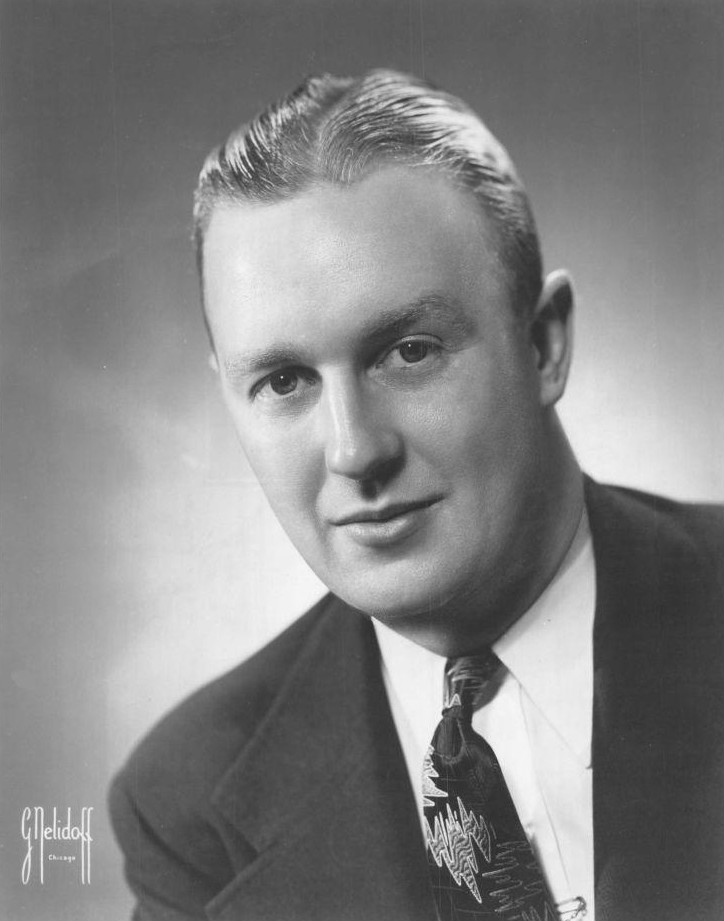
- Brickhouse in 1958
- Born: John Beasley Brickhouse; January 24, 1916; Peoria, Illinois, U.S.
- Died: August 6, 1998 (aged 82); Chicago, Illinois, U.S.
- Sports commentary career
- Team(s): Chicago White Sox (1940–45, 1947–67); Chicago Cubs (1940–44, 1947–81); New York Giants (1946); Chicago Bears (1953–77); Chicago Packers/Zephyrs (1961–63); Chicago Bulls (1966–73)
- Genre: Play-by-play
- Sport(s): Major League Baseball; National Football League; National Basketball Association

John Beasley Brickhouse (January 24, 1916 – August 6, 1998) was an American sportscaster. Known primarily for his play-by-play coverage of Chicago Cubs games on WGN-TV from 1948 to 1981, he received the Ford C. Frick Award from the Baseball Hall of Fame in 1983. In 1985, Brickhouse was inducted into the American Sportscasters Association Hall of Fame along with the Voice of the Yankees Mel Allen and Red Sox Voice Curt Gowdy. Brickhouse served as the organization's Secretary/Treasurer and was a member of its board of directors.

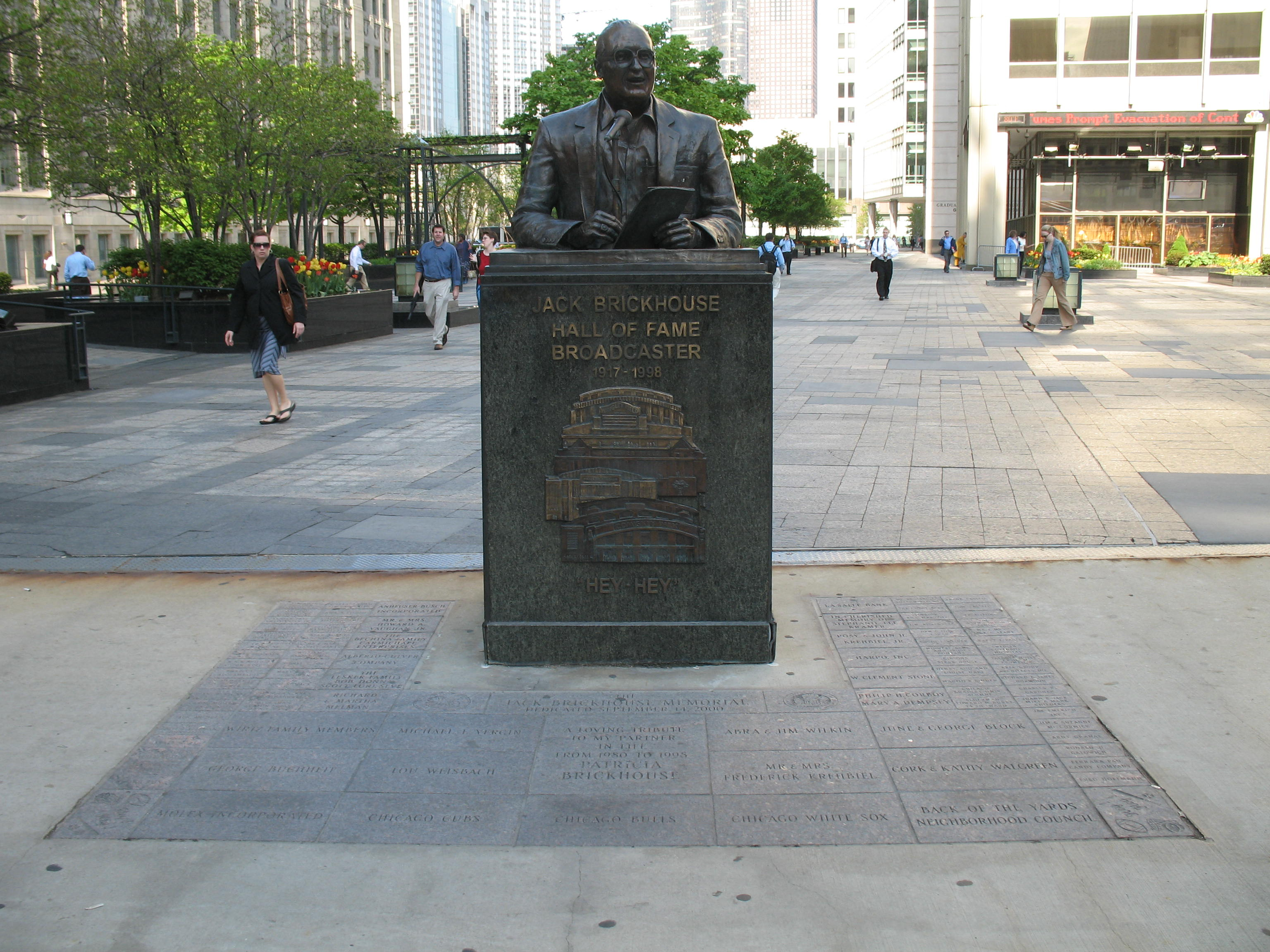
Bust of Jack Brickhouse in Chicago

Brickhouse also called Chicago White Sox games prior to that team leaving WGN in 1968. He covered national events from time to time, including three World Series for NBC television, although the Cubs never got there during his tenure. The voice on the audio track of the famous Willie Mays catch in Game 1 of the 1954 Series at the Polo Grounds belongs to Brickhouse, who was doing the Series along with the New York Giants' regular broadcaster, Russ Hodges. (Brickhouse had also called Giants games locally in 1946.) Brickhouse called the 1959 Series, which featured the White Sox with Los Angeles Dodgers announcer Vin Scully, and the 1950 Series with Jim Britt. In addition, Brickhouse partnered with fellow baseball broadcaster Mel Allen for NBC coverage of the 1952 Rose Bowl, and with Chris Schenkel for the network's coverage of NFL Championship Games in 1956 and 1963.

Brickhouse covered many other events in and outside of sports, such as professional wrestling for WGN and political conventions for the Mutual radio network. From 1953 to 1977 he was the voice of Chicago Bears football on WGN-AM radio, in an unlikely and entertaining pairing with the famous Chicago Sun-Times gossip columnist Irv Kupcinet. Brickhouse called Chicago Bulls basketball games for WGN-TV from 1966 until 1973, making him the voice of three of the major Chicago sports teams during that period. He was a boxing commentator as well. Fights he worked include the 1949 fight between Jersey Joe Walcott and Ezzard Charles and the 1951 fight between Johnny Bratton and Charley Fusari.

== Biography ==
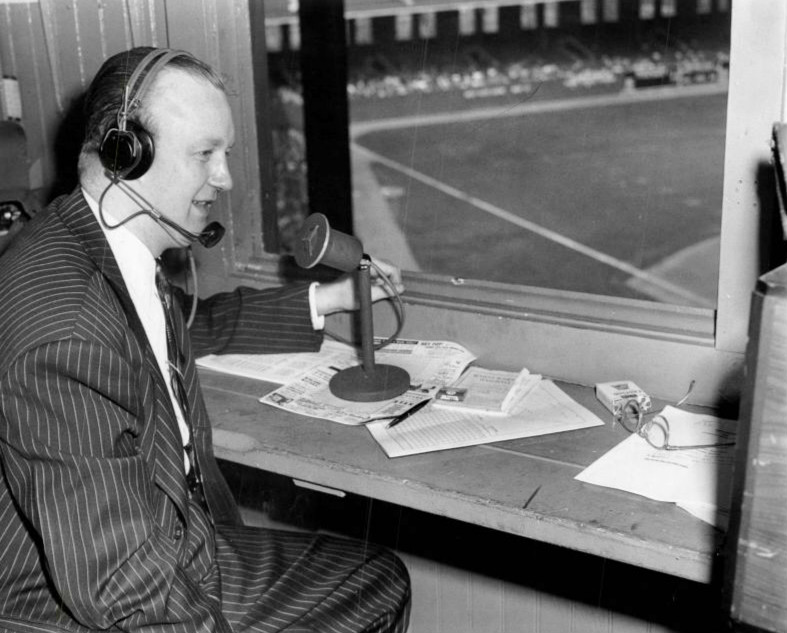
Brickhouse in the Comiskey Park press box in 1948 preparing to announce a White Sox game on television

Brickhouse was born in Peoria, Illinois, to Will and Daisy Brickhouse. His father died when Jack was two years old, and he was largely raised by his mother. He started his first job when he was only eleven, delivering the Peoria Journal and Peoria Star, and subsequently attended Peoria Manual High School.

He began his long broadcasting career at eighteen, at Peoria radio station WMBD in 1934. Chicago radio station WGN hired him in 1940 to broadcast Cubs and White Sox games, largely on the recommendation of their top announcer, Bob Elson. Brickhouse served in the U.S. Marine Corps in World War II. He announced White Sox games on WJJD in 1945 but missed the 1945 Cubs season, the only time during his broadcasting career that the Cubs would win the National League pennant. His was the first face seen when WGN-TV, Chicago's Channel 9, began broadcasting in 1948. His only pennant as a broadcaster was won by the White Sox in 1959, but neither the 1945 Cubs nor the 1959 Sox won the World Series.

Brickhouse broadcast both Cubs and White Sox games until 1967, because they almost never played at home on the same day. He retired in 1981.

Even in retirement, Brickhouse maintained a high profile as a Cubs and WGN ambassador. He occasionally returned to the booth for special events, such as Wrigley Field's annual "70's Night". He also guest-hosted with Harry Caray when the Cubs secured their first postseason berth in 39 years, as they clinched the 1984 National League Eastern Division title in Pittsburgh. The Cubs won the first two games of the League Championship Series at Wrigley, but lost three games to the Padres in San Diego, once again failing to win the pennant (1984 was the last year that the LCS was a best-of-five series).

Brickhouse hosted a weekly segment on WGN's local version of WCW Pro in the early 1990s called "Brickhouse's Bonus." In 1990, Brickhouse narrated the retrospective VHS tape, The Sporting News Presents Baseball in the 80's.

== Broadcasting style ==
Brickhouse tried to let the pictures speak for themselves. In contrast, his successor as Cubs announcer, Harry Caray, a radio broadcaster by training, tended to describe the game on TV as if he were doing a radio broadcast. Brickhouse was sparer with his descriptive prose; perhaps not as spare as Vin Scully of the Los Angeles Dodgers, but talking in quick bursts rather than long sentences, knowing that the well-established camera work of WGN-TV and of producer Arne Harris would tell much of the story.

Instead of over-describing the action, "Brick" was more likely to add "flavor" to what was obviously happening, with almost childlike enthusiasm. He would pepper his play-by-play with various old-fashioned expressions, such as "Whew, boy!" after a close play that went the home team's way, or "Oh, brother!" when it went the other way, or "Wheeeee!" when the team would do something well. During games at Wrigley Field, if the score was tied going into the bottom of the ninth inning, Brickhouse would retort, "Any old kind of a run wins it for the Cubs."

His best-known expression was "Hey-hey!" after an outstanding play by the home team such as a homer in baseball or a touchdown in football, or even after taking a trick in a card game. But it was when he used it for a home run call that stuck in fans' memories, and that phrase now vertically adorns the screens on the foul poles at Wrigley Field along with Caray's signature expression, "Holy Cow!"

Chicago columnist and lifelong Cubs fan Mike Royko's annual Cubs quiz, April 11, 1968, included the following question:

Q: Quick – When a ball goes over the left field wall, what street does it land on?
A: Waveland Avenue. But to hear Jack Brickhouse yell, you'd think it landed in his eye.

(One More Time: The Best of Mike Royko, University of Chicago, 1999, p. 29-31)

Some examples of Brickhouse's calls:

September 22, 1959; White Sox at Cleveland in the ninth inning of what would be the American League pennant-clinching game.

"[Carroll] Hardy on second, [Jimmy] Piersall on first, and 'dangerous' Vic Power is up ... one out. Power ... is 1 for 4, an infield single ... there's a ground ball ... [Luis] Aparicio has it ... steps on second, throws to first ... The Ball Game's over! The White Sox are the Champions of 1959!! a forty-year ... wait has now ended!!!"

May 15, 1960; pitcher Don Cardwell, in his Cub debut, is trying to get the last out of a no-hitter, against the St. Louis Cardinals; the batter is Joe Cunningham, the left fielder is Walt "Moose" Moryn...

- "Watch it now ... Hit on a line to left ... Come on, Moose! ... He caught it! Moryn made a fabulous catch! ... It's a no-hitter for Cardwell! ... What a catch that Moryn made; what a catch he made!"

December 15, 1963; Bears defensive back Dave Whitsell makes a game-clinching pick-six interception, defeating Detroit and clinching the Western Conference for the Bears...

- "Here's the pass ... picked off by Whitsell! ... He's gonna go!! ... He's gonna go!!! ... Touchdown!!!! ... Hey-Hey!!!!!"

May 12, 1970; Atlanta's Pat Jarvis pitches to "Mr. Cub", Ernie Banks...

- "Jarvis fires away ... That's a fly ball, deep to left, back, back ... That's It! Hey-Hey! He did it!! Ernie Banks got number 500!!! The ball tossed to the bullpen ... everybody on your feet ... this ... is it!!!! wheeeeeee!!!!!"

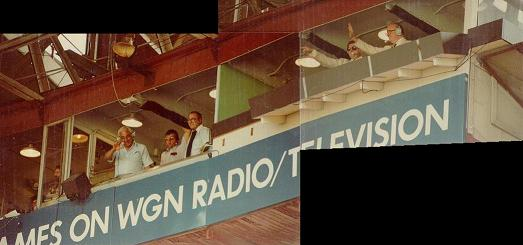
Cubs broadcasters, June 11, 1981 – Vince Lloyd, Lou Boudreau, Milo Hamilton, Jack Brickhouse

== Illness and death ==
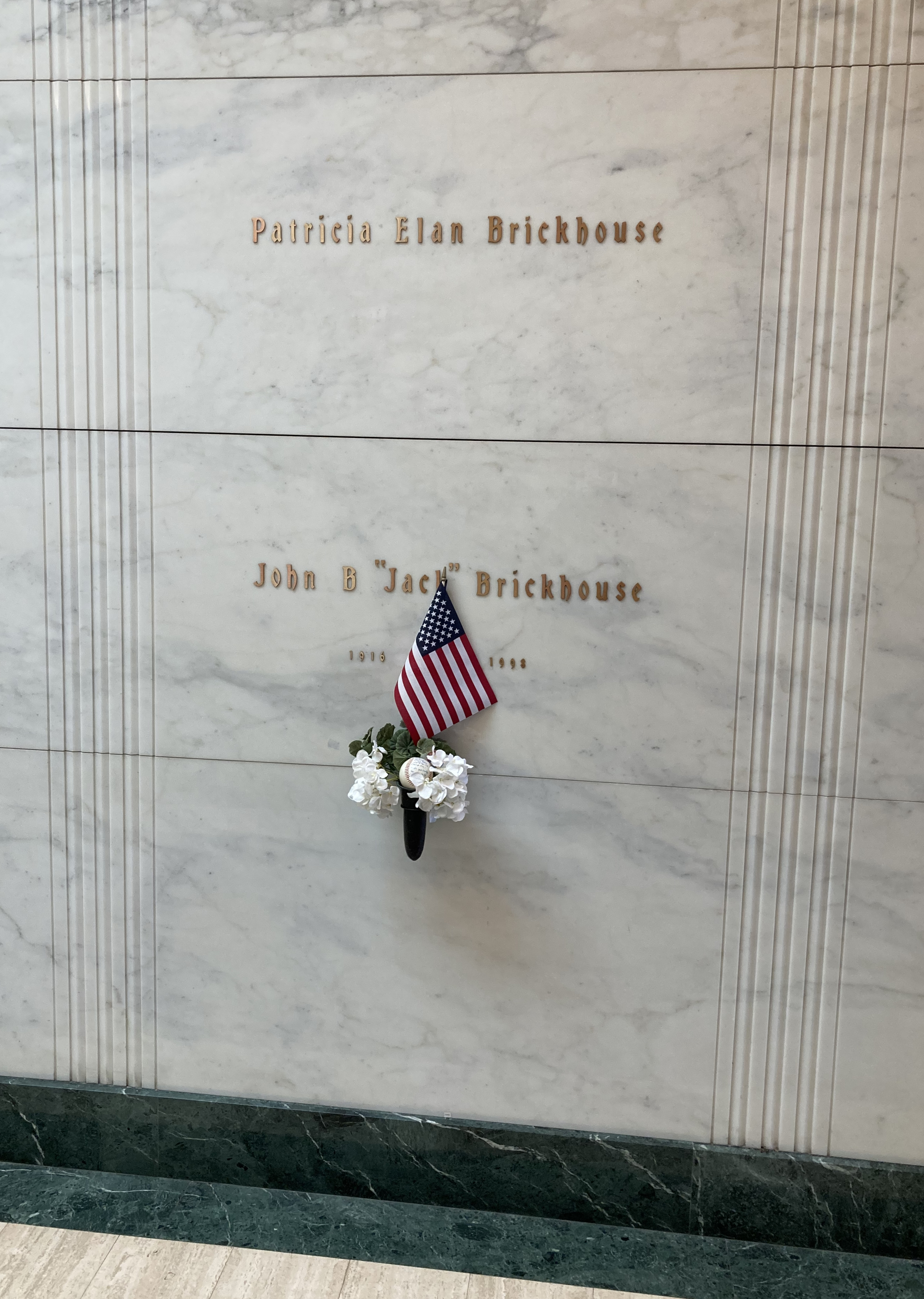
Brickhouse's grave at Rosehill Mausoleum

On February 27, 1998, Brickhouse fell ill and collapsed while preparing for the funeral of fellow Chicago broadcaster Harry Caray. Following brain surgery on March 3 to remove a blood clot, he quickly improved, making a few on-air appearances in the spring and early summer. Though burdened with a gravelly voice (which he attributed to the surgery and said would soon pass), Brickhouse seemed on the road to recovery until his death on August 6 from cardiac arrest. He was interred at the Rosehill Cemetery and Mausoleum in Chicago.

== Legacy ==
Brickhouse was inducted into the Radio Hall of Fame in 1998.

His godson Scott Simon followed him into broadcasting.
