= Lorn Brown =

American sports broadcaster (1938–2010)

- Born: September 18, 1938; East Chicago, Indiana, U.S.
- Died: June 24, 2010 (aged 71); Las Cruces, New Mexico, U.S.
- Education: Illinois Central College
- Sports commentary career
- Team(s): Chicago White Sox (1976–79); Milwaukee Brewers (1980–81); New York Mets (1982)
- Genre: Play-by-play
- Sport: Major League Baseball

Lorn Brown (September 18, 1938 – June 24, 2010) was a sports broadcaster who worked for baseball's AAA Iowa Oaks (1973–1974) and MLB St. Louis Cardinals (September 1974 fill-in), Chicago White Sox (1976–1979, 1983–1988), Milwaukee Brewers (1980–1981), and New York Mets (1982), among other jobs. He once said that he changed the spelling of his first name from Lorne to Lorn because he didn't want to be confused with the actor Lorne Greene.

Brown's career included working alongside such baseball broadcasters as Harry Caray, Bob Uecker, and Bob Murphy, each a recipient of the prestigious Ford C. Frick Award, the highest honor in the field. While a member of the Mets' TV broadcast team (WOR Channel 9), many Mets fans referred to him as "The Professor" because of his appearance; beside his greying beard and glasses, he would often choose to wear a vest or a tweed jacket on air. He was replaced in the Mets booth by Tim McCarver, who would go on to become the highest-profile baseball broadcaster of his generation and winner of the Ford Frick award.

According to Daniel Okrent, his work alongside Uecker could be strained:

Long baseball seasons demanded humor, and Uecker provided it. With the players, he was always charming; at other times, though, he could be brutally cold, as he was to his radio-booth partner from the year before, Lorn Brown. When Brown was doing the play-by-play, Uecker would turn off his mike, making himself inaccessible to a desperate Brown, a decent, earnest, and rather unimaginative man who couldn't easily make it through an inning without the help of a partner. Brown was stolid, plodding, hung up on statistics. He was also painfully ill at ease among ball players, and Uecker disdained him for it.

Brown's basketball work included Bradley U., Drake U, Big 10, ACC, Missouri Valley, Notre Dame and Metro Conf. TV networks, as well as Chicago Bulls television from 1974 to 1978. Brown is a member of the Illinois Basketball Coaches Hall of Fame.

Brown also turned his baritone voice toward work in the commercial voice-over field, narrating commercials for Budweiser beer, Ace Hardware, and the National Football League, among others. He was represented by Grossman & Jack Talent, Inc.

He attended Mount Carmel High School in Chicago.

Brown died from apparent heart failure on June 24, 2010, at the age of 71.
