= Bert Wilson (sportscaster) =

American radio broadcaster (1911–1955)

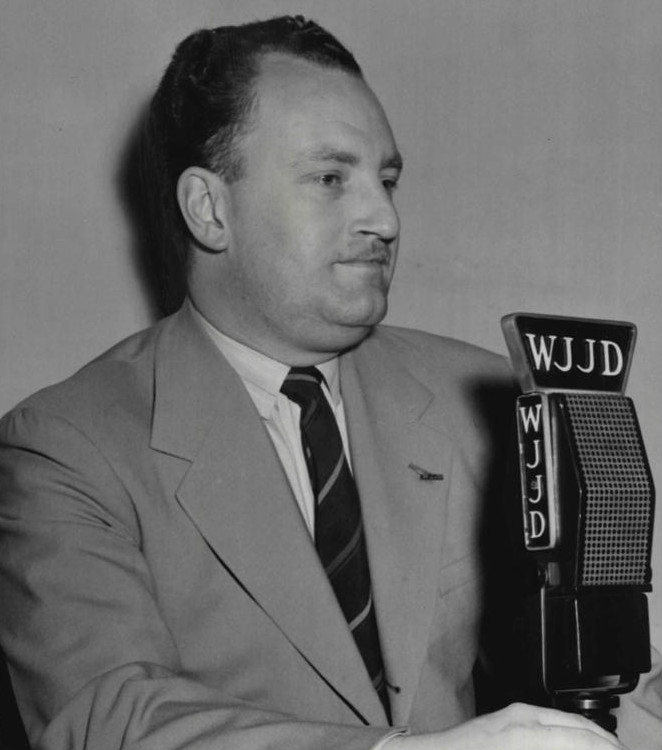
- Wilson in 1949
- Born: Ralph Bertram Puckett; February 5, 1911; Columbus, Ohio, U.S.
- Died: November 5, 1955 (aged 44); Mesa, Arizona, U.S.
- Education: University of Iowa
- Occupation: Broadcaster
- Awards: Chicagoland Sports Hall of Fame

Bert Wilson (born Ralph Bertram Puckett; February 5, 1911 – November 5, 1955), was a play-by-play broadcaster for Major League Baseball's Chicago Cubs from 1943 to 1955.

== Biography ==
Wilson was born in Columbus, Ohio, and attended the University of Iowa, studying voice and trumpet performance. He began his radio career in Cedar Rapids, Iowa, before moving to Indianapolis and then Chicago. Wilson spent his first year broadcasting for the Chicago Cubs as Pat Flanagan's assistant, then took over in 1944.

Wilson was an unabashed "homer," known for two catchphrases: "I don't care who wins, as long as it's the Cubs!" and "Sic 'em, Cubs!" He also invented a short-lived catchphrase for the double play combination of Ernie Banks, Gene Baker and Steve Bilko: "Bingo to Bango to Bilko"; the phrase did not threaten the fame of "Tinker to Evers to Chance". He also had other well-known phrases, such as "It's a beautiful day in Chicago" and, when the Cubs were doing poorly near the end of the season as they frequently were, "Bring on the Bears." Wilson also called Chicago Bears football in the 1940s.

The Cubs were contenders when Wilson first began covering them for WGN, but by the mid-1950s were engaged in an annual battle with the Pittsburgh Pirates for last place in the National League. Following the 1955 season, Wilson, worn out by travel and suffering from heart trouble, left the Cubs and signed with the Cincinnati Reds to do a less taxing schedule of play-by-play on television in 1956. Wilson, however, died at age 44 from heart failure that November near his winter home in Mesa, Arizona. He was survived by his wife and three children.

Wilson is an inductee of the Chicagoland Sports Hall of Fame. He has twice been a finalist for the Ford C. Frick Award, presented by the National Baseball Hall of Fame.
