= Milo Hamilton =

American sportscaster (1927–2015)

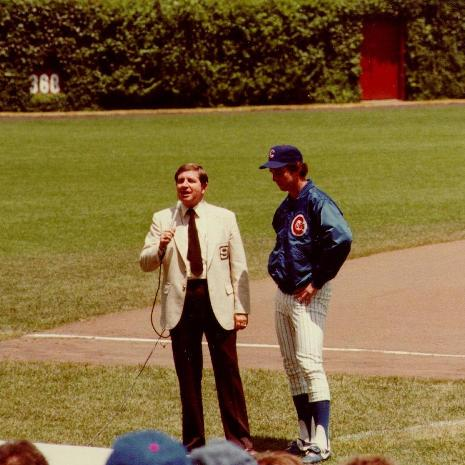
- Hamilton preparing to interview Mike Krukow at Wrigley Field in 1981
- Born: Leland Milo Hamilton; September 2, 1927; Fairfield, Iowa, U.S.
- Died: September 17, 2015 (aged 88); Houston, Texas, U.S.
- Occupation: Sportscaster
- Years active: 1953–2012
- Spouse: Arlene Weiskopf (m. 1952; w. 2005)
- Children: 2
- Sports commentary career
- Teams: St. Louis Browns (1953); St. Louis Cardinals (1954); Chicago Cubs (1955–57, 1980–84); Chicago White Sox (1961–65); Atlanta Braves (1966–75); Pittsburgh Pirates (1976–79); Houston Astros (1985–2012)
- Genre: Play-by-play
- Sport: Baseball (MLB)

Leland Milo Hamilton (September 2, 1927 – September 17, 2015) was an American sportscaster, best known for calling play-by-play for seven different Major League Baseball teams from 1953 to 2012, most prominently for the Houston Astros from 1985 until his retirement in 2012. He received the Ford C. Frick Award from the Baseball Hall of Fame in 1992.

== Early career ==
Hamilton was born in Fairfield, Iowa, a small city in the southeastern part of the state. He served in the United States Navy during World War II. During his time in the Navy, he broadcast on Armed Forces Radio. He graduated from the University of Iowa in 1949. After beginning his sportscasting career by calling college football and basketball for the Iowa Hawkeyes, as well as minor league baseball for the Davenport Tigers and pro basketball for the Tri-Cities Blackhawks (now the Atlanta Hawks) of the NBA, he got his first MLB announcing job in 1953, with the St. Louis Browns of the American League.

When the Browns moved to Baltimore as the Orioles, Hamilton did not go with them. Instead, he joined the St. Louis Cardinals, where he worked alongside Harry Caray and Jack Buck during the 1954 season. However, he was let go after only one year when the Cardinals wanted a spot in the booth for Joe Garagiola. Hamilton next moved to the Chicago Cubs, working alongside Bert Wilson and Jack Quinlan. After three years, he was let go when Cubs owner P. K. Wrigley wanted to make room for Lou Boudreau as a broadcaster.

After four years away from baseball, Hamilton was hired by the Chicago White Sox in 1961, serving as the assistant to longtime announcer Bob Elson.

== Atlanta Braves ==
When the Milwaukee Braves relocated to Atlanta for the 1966 season, Hamilton got the call to become the team's play-by-play announcer. Hamilton's voice was already somewhat known in Atlanta; local station WGST had been part of the White Sox radio network in the early 1960s. Hamilton was paired with Ernie Johnson, Sr., a retired Braves player.

Hamilton soon became so popular in Atlanta that executives with Braves flagship station WSB-TV credited the Braves' high ratings on television (in 1972, with a prime-time ratio of 27) in part to Hamilton. During much of this period, he was also the commercial spokesperson for Atlanta-based Delta Air Lines, appearing on camera for Delta commercials introducing the Lockheed L-1011 and the Boeing 747 to Delta's fleet.

While in Atlanta, Hamilton narrated Hank Aaron's record-breaking 715th career home run in the Braves' home opener for 1974:

Henry Aaron, in the second inning walked and scored ... He's sittin' on 714 ... Here's the pitch by Downing ... swinging ... there's a drive into left-center field ... that ball is gonna beeee ... OUTTA HERE! IT'S GONE! IT'S 715! There's a new home run champion of all time ... and it's HENRY AARON!

Years later Hamilton remarked, "Hammer (Aaron) and I are forever joined at the hip because of 715."

The Braves did not draw well at that time because of several poor-to-mediocre seasons from 1971 through 1975. Hamilton criticized the poor attendance on the air. He refused to gloss over this issue, and the Braves' owners fired him after the 1975 season. Shortly thereafter, the team was sold to Ted Turner, who made the Braves a national phenomenon via then-cable "superstation" WTCG (later to become WTBS, now TBS) with Hamilton's replacements Skip Caray and Pete Van Wieren, and with Johnson continuing in the booth.

== Pittsburgh Pirates ==
Hamilton briefly considered a return to St. Louis after Jack Buck left the Cardinals for NBC, but pulled out of talks after learning that Buck could return to the team to reclaim his job if the NBC project (GrandStand) failed. Instead, he joined the Pittsburgh Pirates for the 1976 season, succeeding Bob Prince. Any announcer would have had difficulty following the deeply entrenched Prince, who had been part of the Pirates' broadcast team since 1948 and who had been the Pirates' top announcer since 1954. Hamilton was the subject of biting criticism by sportswriters and by fans. Most of them were used to Prince's folksy style, and they thought that Hamilton was too restrained. One writer derided Hamilton's style as "broadcast-school professionalism". Hamilton proved to be relatively thin-skinned to the criticism, and even felt that Prince manipulated Pittsburgh sportswriters against him, as well as attempting to track down people who wrote critical letters to newspapers about his commentary. In the end, the situation in Pittsburgh became untenable for both Hamilton and the fans, and he eventually left to be replaced by his color man Lanny Frattare, with whom he hadn't gotten along, and whose announcing style was more similar to Prince's.

== Chicago Cubs ==
Unhappy in Pittsburgh, Hamilton jumped at a chance to return to Chicago in 1980 to join the Cubs' broadcast team alongside Brickhouse, Lloyd and Boudreau. He was under the impression that he was heir-apparent to Brickhouse upon the latter's retirement; indeed, he later said that he had been "guaranteed in blood" that he would replace Brickhouse on Cubs television broadcasts in 1982. Brickhouse himself called Hamilton "the voice of the Cubs for years to come" just before he retired in 1981. That plan changed when Harry Caray, discontented with new White Sox ownership, was brought in shortly after the Tribune Company bought the Cubs.

Hamilton and Caray never got along, in part because Hamilton blamed Caray for his replacement with Garagiola 27 years earlier in St. Louis. Hamilton claims that during the 1984 season, their relationship got even chillier when Caray admitted to him that he'd in fact had an affair with the daughter-in-law of the longtime Cardinals owner Gussie Busch — which has long been rumored to be the reason for his firing by the Cardinals in 1969.

Hamilton also claimed that Caray said on the air that he had mailed alimony checks to all of his ex-wives. However, on the record, Caray always denied that there was ever an affair.

The Cubs dismissed Hamilton after the 1984 season. Hamilton blamed Caray for the firing. He told the writer Curt Smith that officials at WGN-TV spent an hour praising him, but they told him that they had to dismiss him because Caray didn't like him, and Caray was more important to the Cubs.

Hamilton made comments critical of Caray that were published in a story after the latter's death in 1998, but Hamilton claimed in his book Making Airwaves: 60 Years at Milo's Microphone that his comments quoted in that story were actually part of a magazine article from 13 years earlier, and that he did not in fact make the comments after Caray's death. This story prompted an angry reaction from Caray's son, Skip Caray, who had succeeded Hamilton as a broadcaster for the Atlanta Braves. In 2006, Hamilton related his experiences with Caray in his autobiography. He devoted a chapter to Caray, whom he referred to as the Canary, calling him "a miserable human being."

== Houston Astros ==
After leaving Chicago, Hamilton joined up with the Houston Astros. This was his longest and last tenure as announcer. He spent two years as the number-two announcer behind longtime Astros voice Gene Elston (another native Iowan). After Elston was criticized for his lackluster call of the 1986 NL West clinching no-hitter by Mike Scott, he was let go, and Hamilton became the Astros main announcer from 1987 through 2012. While Elston called the 1986 NL West clincher against the San Francisco Giants on television alongside Bill Worrell, Hamilton called the game on the radio alongside Larry Dierker. This is Hamilton's call of the final out:

Scott has struck out a dozen. His teammates have all the hits in the game. The score is 2-0 Houston. Now the hitter is Will Clark. He’s 0-for-3. Swing and a bouncer! This could be it! (Glenn) Davis runs to the bag! Game is over! No-hitter! Astros win the championship! What a way to do it! A no-hitter! Mike Scott has just thrown his first career no-hitter, and the Astros are the National League champions of the West!

On July 29, 2005, Hamilton, now in his late 70s, announced that starting with the 2006 season, he would no longer accompany the club on the road, announcing only home games, although he traveled with the club when Busch Stadium, Nationals Park, Citi Field, and Marlins Park opened respectively.

In February 2012, Hamilton announced his plans to retire as an active broadcaster after the 2012 season, though intending to remain active with the Astros in a more limited way.

== Other sports ==
In addition to his early work with the Iowa Hawkeyes and Tri-Cities Blackhawks, Hamilton also, at various points in his career, called NBA basketball for the Chicago Zephyrs, Chicago Bulls and Houston Rockets; college basketball for Northwestern, Georgia Tech, Kentucky, and DePaul, as well as various Southwest Conference games for the Home Sports Entertainment channel in the '80s; and college football for Northwestern, Ohio State and Georgia Tech.

== Commentating style ==
Hamilton's style could be described as enthusiastic but not "over the top." He told Smith that Elston encouraged him to save his voice for thrilling moments, such as Aaron's 715th home run. Hamilton was also known for his catch phrase "Holy Toledo, what a play!"

== Honors ==
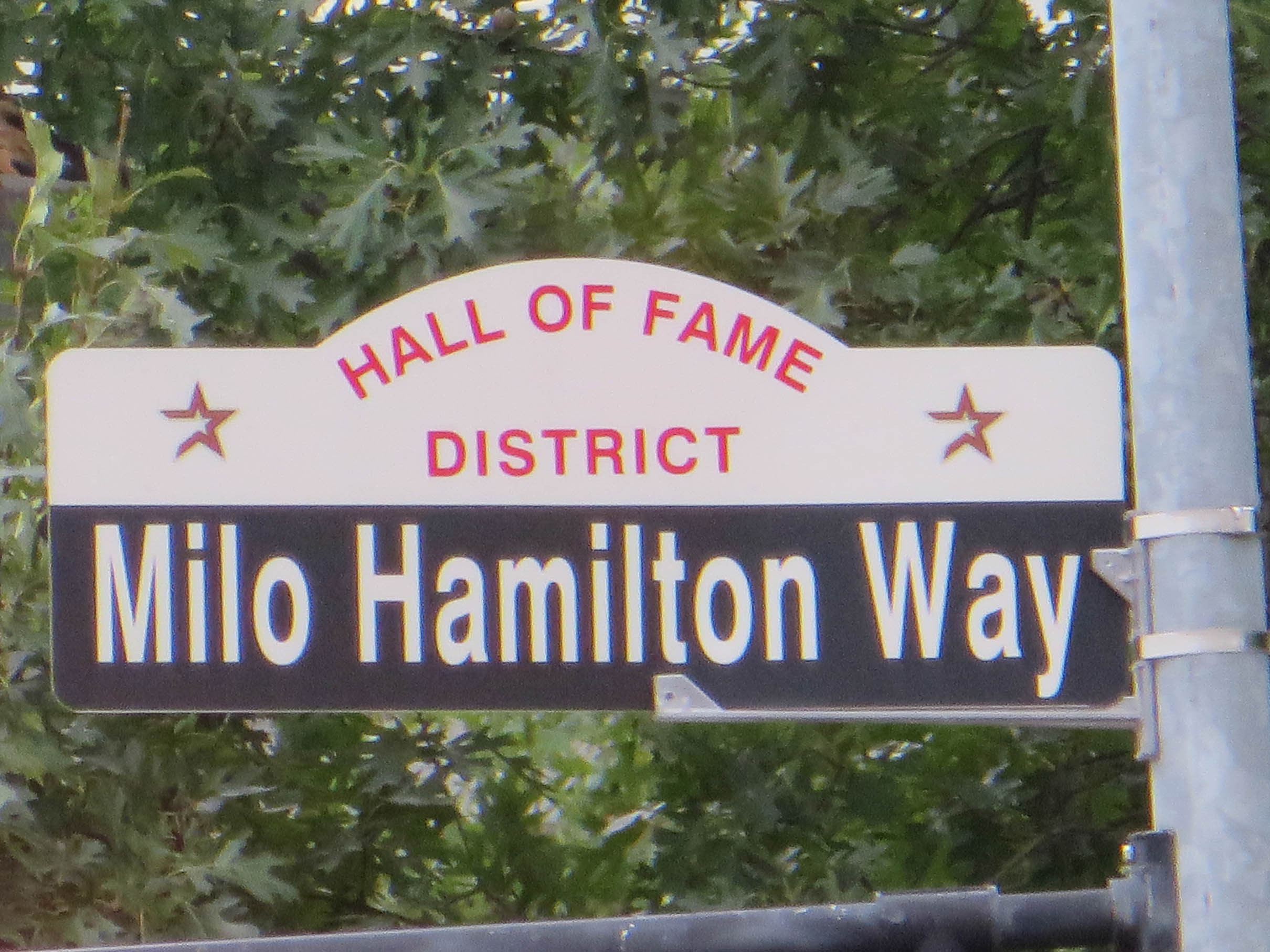
Milo Hamilton Way in Houston

Hamilton was the 1992 recipient of the Baseball Hall of Fame's Ford C. Frick Award. He was inducted into the National Radio Hall of Fame in 2000 and later inducted into the Texas Radio Hall of Fame.

On April 8, 2009, during the opening series against the Chicago Cubs, Houston Mayor Bill White dedicated Hamilton Street in downtown Houston to Milo Hamilton by renaming it Milo Hamilton Way.

Through his retirement in 2012, Hamilton had broadcast major league games in 59 different ballparks.

Hamilton was elected, as part of the inaugural class, to the Houston Astros Hall of Fame in 2019.

== Personal ==
His wife of nearly 53 years, Arlene, died at age 73 in February 2005. The couple had two children: Mark and Patricia. The Hamiltons’ daughter, Patricia Joy Hamilton Watson, a former Delta Air Lines flight attendant, died on July 10, 2006, in Atlanta, three weeks after suffering a stroke.

On October 7, 2007, Hamilton suffered a heart attack while eating lunch with his son in Houston. He was taken to Houston Methodist Hospital in the Texas Medical Center, where doctors discovered that one of his coronary arteries was 99 percent blocked. Hamilton underwent a successful angioplasty and recovered to return to his sportscasting career.

Hamilton died on September 17, 2015, at the age of 88 after having chronic lymphocytic leukemia since 1974. For the rest of the season and through their playoff run, the Astros added a patch with Hamilton's initials on their uniforms.

== See also ==
- Houston Astros award winners and league leaders
