= 2016 Baseball Hall of Fame balloting =

Elections to the Baseball Hall of Fame

National Baseball

Hall of Fame and Museum
- New inductees: 2
- via BBWAA: 2
- Total inductees: 312
- Induction date: July 24, 2016

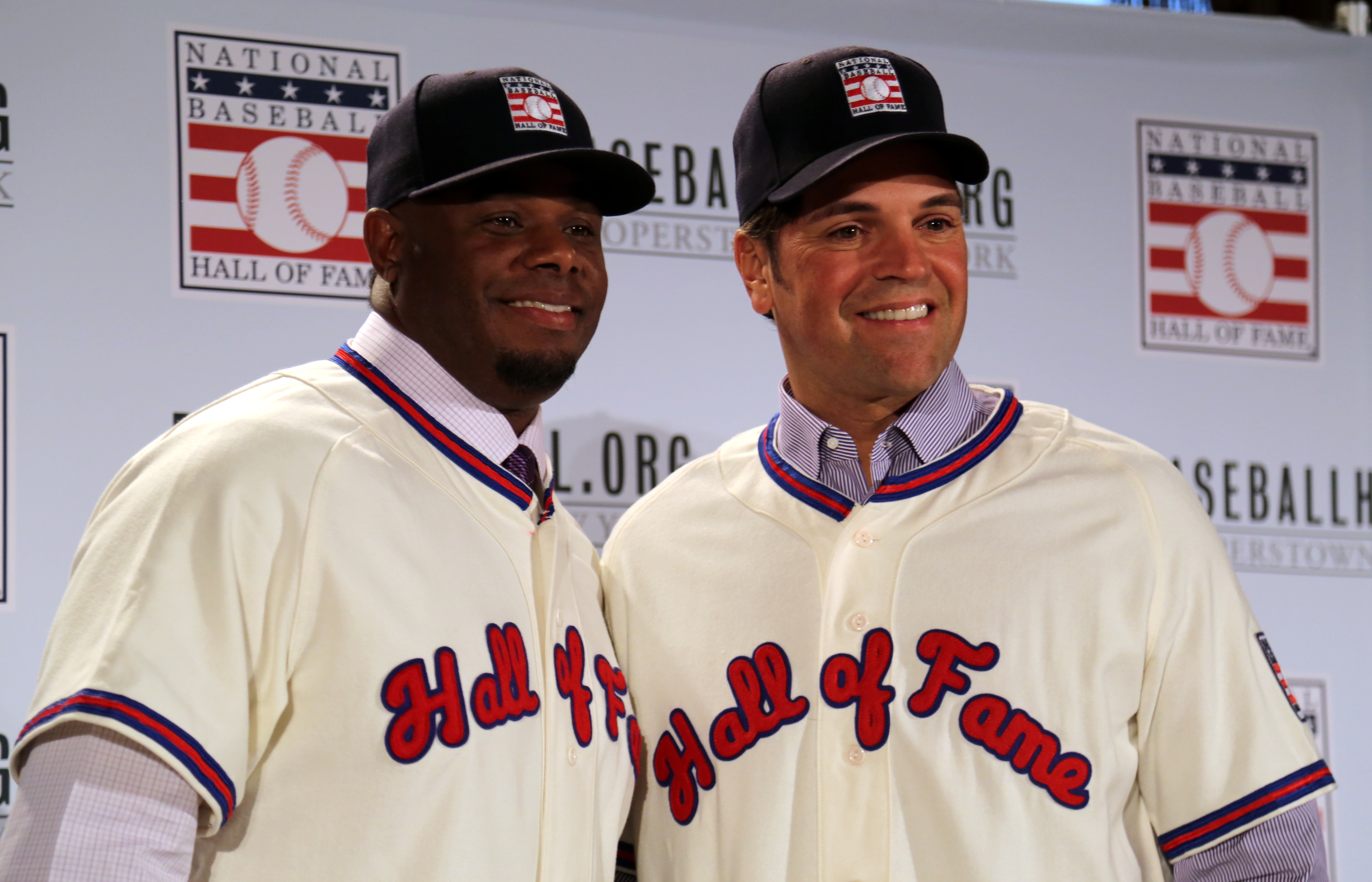
2016 inductees Ken Griffey Jr. (left) and Mike Piazza

Elections to the Baseball Hall of Fame for 2016 proceeded according to rules most recently amended in 2015. As in the past, the Baseball Writers' Association of America (BBWAA) voted by mail to select from a ballot of recently retired players, with results announced on January 6, 2016; Ken Griffey Jr. and Mike Piazza were elected to the Hall of Fame.

The Pre-Integration Era Committee, the last of three new voting committees established during an earlier rules change in 2010 to replace the more broadly defined Veterans Committee, convened in December 2015 to select from a ballot of players and non-playing personnel who made their greatest contributions to the sport prior to 1947 – called the "Pre-Integration Era" by the Hall of Fame – but failed to select any inductees.

The Hall of Fame induction ceremonies was held on July 24, 2016, at the Hall of Fame in Cooperstown, New York, with commissioner Rob Manfred presiding. On the day before the actual induction ceremony, the annual Hall of Fame Awards Presentation took place. At that event, two awards for media excellence were presented – the Hall's Ford C. Frick Award for broadcasters and the BBWAA's J. G. Taylor Spink Award for writers. The other major Hall of Fame award, the Buck O'Neil Lifetime Achievement Award, was not scheduled to be presented again until 2017.

== BBWAA election ==
On July 26, 2014, the Hall announced changes to the rules for election for recently retired players, reducing the number of years a player will be eligible to be on the ballot from fifteen years to ten. Two candidates presently on the BBWAA ballot (Lee Smith and Alan Trammell) in years 10-15 were grandfathered into this system and retained their previous 15 years of eligibility. In addition, BBWAA members who were otherwise eligible to cast ballots were required to complete a registration form and sign a code of conduct before receiving their ballots, and the Hall will make public the names of all members who cast ballots (but not their individual votes) when it announces the election results. The code of conduct specifically states that the ballot is non-transferable, a direct reaction to Dan Le Batard turning his 2014 Hall of Fame ballot over to the sports website Deadspin and allowing the site's readers to make his Hall votes (an act that drew him a lifetime ban from future Hall voting). Violation of the code of conduct will result in a lifetime ban from BBWAA voting.

The most recent rules change, announced on July 28, 2015, tightened the qualifications for the BBWAA electorate. Beginning with the 2016 election, eligible voters must not only have 10 years of continuous BBWAA membership, but also be currently active members, or have held active status within the 10 years prior to the election. A BBWAA member who has not been active for more than 10 years can regain voting status by covering MLB in the year preceding the election. As a result of the new rule, the vote total in 2016 decreased by 109 from the previous year, to 440.

The BBWAA ballot was announced on November 9, 2015; ballots were submitted by December 21, and results were announced on January 6, 2016. The ballot included two categories of players:

- Candidates from the 2015 ballot who received at least 5% of the vote but were not elected, as long as they first appeared on the BBWAA ballot no earlier than 2002.
- Selected individuals, chosen by a screening committee, whose last appearance was in 2010.

All BBWAA members with at least 10 years of continuous membership and active membership status at any time in the preceding 10 years were eligible to vote. There were 440 total ballots cast with 3,496 individual votes for players, an average of 7.95 players named per ballot.

As in most recent elections, the controversy over use of performance-enhancing drugs (PEDs) is likely to dominate the election. ESPN.com columnist Jim Caple noted in the days before the announcement of the 2012 results that the PED issue and the BBWAA's limit of 10 votes per ballot was likely to result in a major backlog in upcoming elections:

Due to the steroid issue and a general lack of consensus, the following players will probably be on the ballot in three years: Barry Bonds, Roger Clemens, Pedro Martinez, Randy Johnson, Sammy Sosa, Jeff Bagwell, John Smoltz, Edgar Martinez, Mark McGwire, Mike Mussina, Jeff Kent, Larry Walker, Alan Trammell, Fred McGriff, Rafael Palmeiro, Lee Smith, Tim Raines, Gary Sheffield, Mike Piazza, Curt Schilling and, of course, Bernie [Williams]. That's 21 players who warrant serious consideration. And that's not counting Barry Larkin, who might be elected this year, and also assuming Greg Maddux, Tom Glavine, Craig Biggio and Frank Thomas make it their first years on the ballot. Finding room for Bonds, Clemens, Pedro, Johnson and others means I'll have to dump more good players from my ballot than the Marlins dumped after winning the 1997 World Series.

Caple's predictions about the players on the 2015 ballot, as well as the players he expected to be elected before then, mostly proved accurate. Larkin was indeed elected in 2012, and Maddux, Glavine and Thomas were elected on their first ballot appearance in 2014. The main exceptions were Palmeiro and Williams, who got less than 5% of the vote in prior elections and failed to stay on, and Biggio, who fell short of election in both of his first two years on the ballot, missing out in 2014 by two votes. Biggio was finally elected in 2015.

Another ESPN.com writer, Tim Kurkjian, noted that the 2013 ballot would include several new candidates who either tested positive or were strongly linked to PEDs:

The next Hall of Fame ballot will include Barry Bonds, Roger Clemens, Sammy Sosa, Mike Piazza, Craig Biggio and Curt Schilling. They all have Hall of Fame numbers, some stronger than others, but Bonds, Clemens, Sosa and Piazza certainly are not going to be elected on the first ballot — and in the case of Bonds, Clemens and Sosa, they might not make it to Cooperstown for many, many years to come.

In his first year on the ballot, Ken Griffey Jr. received 99.3% of the vote, a BBWAA election record at the time (surpassing the 98.84% of Tom Seaver). Mike Piazza, in his fourth year, finished second at 83.0% and was the only other player elected. Griffey became the first number 1 pick elected to the Hall of Fame, having been selected first overall in the 1987 MLB Draft, while Piazza became the latest pick to be elected having been selected in the 62nd round of the 1988 MLB Draft.

Alan Trammell and Mark McGwire were on the ballot for their final time. Neither were elected, meaning they will not be eligible for further consideration by the BBWAA. Following a July 2016 rule change, they will be considered eligible for consideration by the Veterans Committees, which has now been split into four eras. In 2017, McGwire appeared on the post-1988 (Today's Game) committee ballot, authorised to consider all MLB figures whose greatest contributions occurred after 1987, with the restriction that the only players that can be considered are those whose BBWAA eligibility has been exhausted. McGwire received fewer than 5 votes. In 2018, Trammell appeared on the Modern Baseball committees ballot, authorised to consider all MLB figures whose greatest contributions occurred from 1970 to 1987, with the restriction that the only players that can be considered are those whose BBWAA eligibility has been exhausted. Trammell was elected, receiving 81.3% of the vote. Other committees include pre-1949 (meeting decennially), 1950-69 (quintennially), and the two biennial committees that will skip when the quintennial and decennial committees vote, the 1980–87 and the aforementioned post-1988.

=== Results ===
Player	Votes	Percent	Change	Year
**Ken Griffey Jr.**†	437	99.3	–	1st
**Mike Piazza**	365	83.0	▲13.1%	4th
Jeff Bagwell	315	71.6	▲15.9%	6th
Tim Raines	307	69.8	▲14.8%	9th
Trevor Hoffman†	296	67.3	–	1st
Curt Schilling	230	52.3	▲13.1%	4th
Roger Clemens	199	45.2	▲7.7%	4th
Barry Bonds	195	44.3	▲7.5%	4th
Edgar Martínez	191	43.4	▲16.4%	7th
Mike Mussina	189	43.0	▲18.4%	3rd
Alan Trammell	180	40.9	▲15.8%	15th
Lee Smith	150	34.1	▲3.9%	14th
Fred McGriff	92	20.9	▲8.0%	7th
Jeff Kent	73	16.6	▲2.6%	3rd
Larry Walker	68	15.5	▲3.7%	6th
Mark McGwire	54	12.3	▲2.3%	10th
Gary Sheffield	51	11.6	▼0.1%	2nd
Billy Wagner†	46	10.5	–	1st
Sammy Sosa	31	7.0	▲0.4%	4th
Jim Edmonds†*	11	2.5	–	1st
Nomar Garciaparra*	8	1.8	▼3.7%	2nd
Mike Sweeney†*	3	0.7	–	1st
David Eckstein†*	2	0.5	–	1st
Jason Kendall†*	2	0.5	–	1st
Garret Anderson†*	1	0.2	–	1st
Brad Ausmus†*	0	0	–	1st
Luis Castillo†*	0	0	–	1st
Troy Glaus†*	0	0	–	1st
Mark Grudzielanek†*	0	0	–	1st
Mike Hampton†*	0	0	–	1st
Mike Lowell†*	0	0	–	1st
Randy Winn†*	0	0	–	1st

Key
	Elected to the Hall of Fame on this ballot (named in **bold italics**).
	Elected subsequently, as of 2026 (named in plain italics).
	Renominated for the 2017 BBWAA election by adequate performance on this ballot and has not been elected, as of 2026.
	Eliminated from annual BBWAA consideration by poor performance or expiration on this ballot and has not been elected, as of 2026.
†	First time on the BBWAA ballot.
*	Eliminated from annual BBWAA consideration by poor performance or expiration on this ballot.

Players who were eligible for the first time who were not included on the ballot were: Ronnie Belliard, Eric Byrnes, Frank Catalanotto, Jesús Colomé, Elmer Dessens, Pedro Feliz, José Guillén, Cristian Guzmán, Bob Howry, Gabe Kapler, Mike Lamb, Jason LaRue, Ron Mahay, Dámaso Marte, Gary Matthews Jr., Gil Meche, Brian Moehler, Chad Moeller, Bengie Molina, Russ Ortiz, Chan Ho Park, Jay Payton, Mike Redmond, Juan Rincón, David Riske, Scott Schoeneweis, Scot Shields, Russ Springer, Fernando Tatís, Jeff Weaver and Gregg Zaun.

== Pre-Integration Era Committee ==
In keeping with the voting procedure by eras, the BBWAA-appointed Historical Overview Committee, made up of 11 BBWAA members, identified ten Pre-Integration candidates who were judged to have made their greatest contributions from the origins of the sport to the end of baseball's color line in 1947. This era was previously under consideration in the 2013 election, when three candidates were elected; Bill Dahlen was the only other candidate to receive more than three votes. Along with the era, these rules defined the consideration set:

- Players who played in at least 10 major league seasons, who are not on Major League Baseball's ineligible list (e.g., Shoeless Joe Jackson), and have been retired for 21 or more seasons.
- Managers and umpires with 10 or more years in baseball and retired for at least five years. Candidates who are 65 years or older are eligible six months after their retirement.
- Executives retired for at least five years. Active executives 65 years or older are eligible for consideration.

However, due to the passage of time, the only listed criteria that materially restricted the field from which the candidates were selected were years of service and presence on baseball's ineligible list.

The eleven BBWAA-appointed Historical Overview Committee members were Dave Van Dyck (Chicago Tribune); Bob Elliott (Toronto Sun); Jim Henneman (formerly Baltimore Sun); Steve Hirdt (Elias Sports Bureau); Rick Hummel (St. Louis Post-Dispatch); Bill Madden (formerly New York Daily News); Jack O'Connell (BBWAA secretary/treasurer); Jim Reeves (formerly Fort Worth Star-Telegram); Tracy Ringolsby (MLB.com); Glenn Schwarz (formerly San Francisco Chronicle); and Mark Whicker (Los Angeles News Group). All except Henneman and Reeves were members of the committee that selected the 2013 candidates.

The Pre-Integration ballot for election was released on October 5, 2015; final voting was conducted by the Pre-Integration Committee, a 16-member body which met at baseball's winter meetings in Nashville on December 6, with 75% (12 of 16 votes) required for election; results were announced the following morning. The committee's members, appointed by the Hall of Fame's board of directors, were announced later in fall 2015 and included members of the Hall, baseball executives, members of the media and historians:

- Hall of Famers: Bert Blyleven, Bobby Cox, Pat Gillick and Phil Niekro
- Executives: Chuck Armstrong, Bill DeWitt, Gary Hughes and Tal Smith
- Media/Historians: Steve Hirdt, Peter Morris, Jack O'Connell, Claire Smith, Tim Sullivan, T.R. Sullivan, Gary Thorne and Tim Wendel

Blyleven, Gillick, Niekro, DeWitt, Hughes, Hirdt, Morris, Smith and T.R. Sullivan previously served on the committee which selected the 2013 inductees. For the second consecutive year, none of the candidates received enough votes for election; it marked the third consecutive year – and the fifth time in seven years – in which no former players were chosen by the Hall's special committees.

At the time of the election, figures from this era were scheduled to be considered prior to the 2019 inductions. However, in July 2016, the Hall announced changes to its era-based committee system, replacing the three then-current committees with four new voting bodies. The Pre-Integration Era body was replaced by the newly created Early Baseball committee. The new committee will consider figures whose greatest contributions occurred before 1950 (a slightly broader time frame from its predecessor), but will not hold its first meeting until 2020 as part of the 2021 election process. Most significantly, this committee will meet only once a decade, specifically in years ending in 0.

The candidates for election were:

Candidate	Category	Votes	Percent
Doc Adams	Pioneer	10	62.5%
Bill Dahlen	Player	8	50%
Harry Stovey	Player	8	50%
Sam Breadon	Executive	<4	
Wes Ferrell	Player	<4	
August Herrmann	Executive	<4	
Marty Marion	Player	<4	
Frank McCormick	Player	<4	
Chris von der Ahe	Executive	<4	
Bucky Walters	Player	<4	

Breadon, Dahlen, Ferrell, Marion and Walters were previously candidates on the 2013 ballot.

== J. G. Taylor Spink Award ==
The J. G. Taylor Spink Award has been presented by the BBWAA at the annual summer induction ceremonies since 1962. Through 2010, it was awarded during the main induction ceremony, but is now given the previous day at the Hall of Fame Awards Presentation. It recognizes a sportswriter "for meritorious contributions to baseball writing". The recipients are not members of the Hall of Fame but are featured in a permanent exhibit at the National Baseball Museum.

On December 8, 2015, Boston Globe columnist Dan Shaughnessy received 185 out of 417 of the votes cast, making him the 2016 recipient of the J. G. Taylor Spink Award.

== Ford C. Frick Award ==
The Ford C. Frick Award, honoring excellence in baseball broadcasting, has been presented at the induction ceremonies since 1978. Through 2010, it had been presented at the main induction ceremony, but is now awarded at the Awards Presentation. Recipients are not members of the Hall of Fame but are permanently recognized in an exhibit at the museum. To be eligible, an active or retired broadcaster must have a minimum of 10 years of continuous major league broadcast service with a ball club, a network, or a combination of the two. The honor is based on four criteria: longevity; continuity with a club; honors, including national assignments such as the World Series and All-Star Games; and popularity with fans.

This was the third and final Frick Award selection under a process similar to that instituted for Veterans Committee balloting in 2010. Under this process, candidates were considered every third year, based on the era in which they made their most significant contributions:

- "Broadcasting Dawn Era" — 1920s to early 1950s, including the early radio broadcasters. Individuals from this era were considered for the 2016 award.
- "High Tide Era" — Mid-1980s to present, including the rise of regional cable networks. Individuals from this era were last considered for the 2014 award.
- "Living Room Era" — Mid-1950s to early 1980s, including the rise of television. Individuals from this era were last considered for the 2015 award.

As part of the rules changes announced in July 2016, the Hall also announced changes to the Frick Award selection process, effective with the 2017 award. While the process will continue to involve three annually rotating voting bodies, the groups of candidates to be considered by each committee have changed. The newly established committees will rotate in the following order: "Current Major League Markets" (team-specific broadcasters), "National Voices" (national broadcasters), and "Broadcasting Beginnings" (early broadcasters). In addition, the number of finalists will be reduced from 10 to 8, and the three ballot slots that had been filled by fan voting on the Hall's Facebook page will now be chosen by a committee of baseball historians.

Ten finalists from the "Broadcasting Dawn Era" were announced on October 6, 2015. In accord with the current guidelines, seven were chosen by a Hall of Fame research committee, while the other three were selected (for the final time) from a list of candidates by fan voting at the Hall's Facebook page from September 14 to October 2.

- Jack Graney
- Harry Heilmann
- Al Helfer
- France Laux
- Tom Manning
- Graham McNamee
- Rosey Rowswell
- Hal Totten
- Ty Tyson
- Bert Wilson

All of the candidates were deceased, with the most recently living among them being Laux, who died in November 1978. Heilmann is a Hall of Fame member as a player.

On December 9, McNamee was announced as the recipient. The Hall's official announcement called him "quite possibly the first celebrity sportscaster... renowned as the most recognized personality during radio’s formative years." He began his broadcasting career in 1923 with WEAF (now known as WNBC) in New York City, and called 12 World Series, countless other baseball games, and 10 other sports until his death in 1942.
