= 2014 Baseball Hall of Fame balloting =

Elections to the Baseball Hall of Fame

National Baseball

Hall of Fame and Museum
- New inductees: 6
- via BBWAA: 3
- via Expansion Era Committee: 3
- Total inductees: 306
- Induction date: July 27, 2014

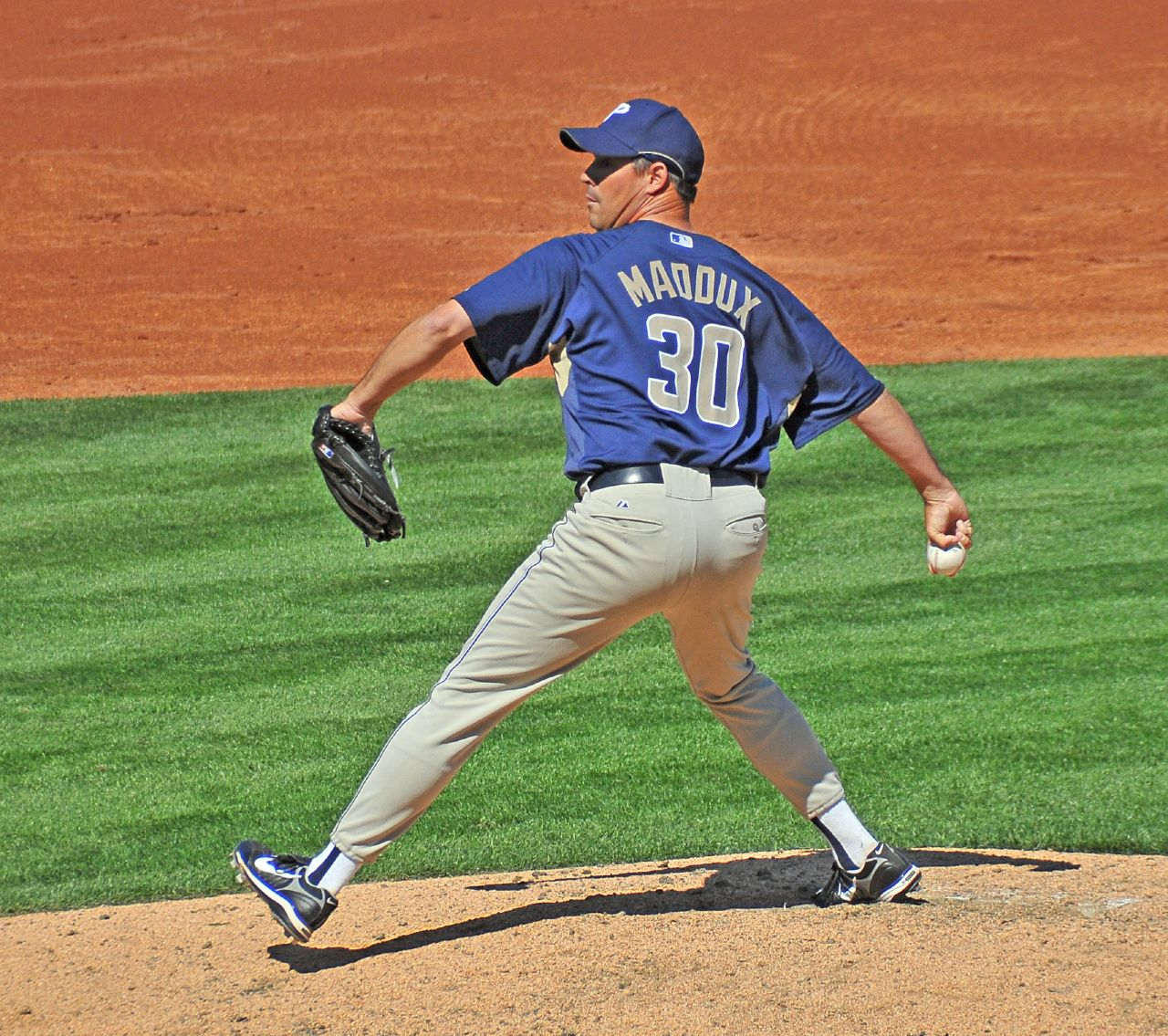
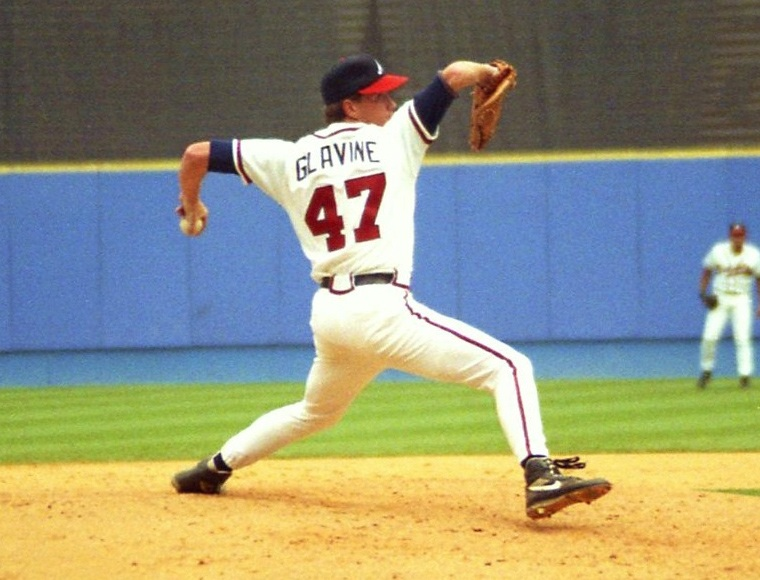
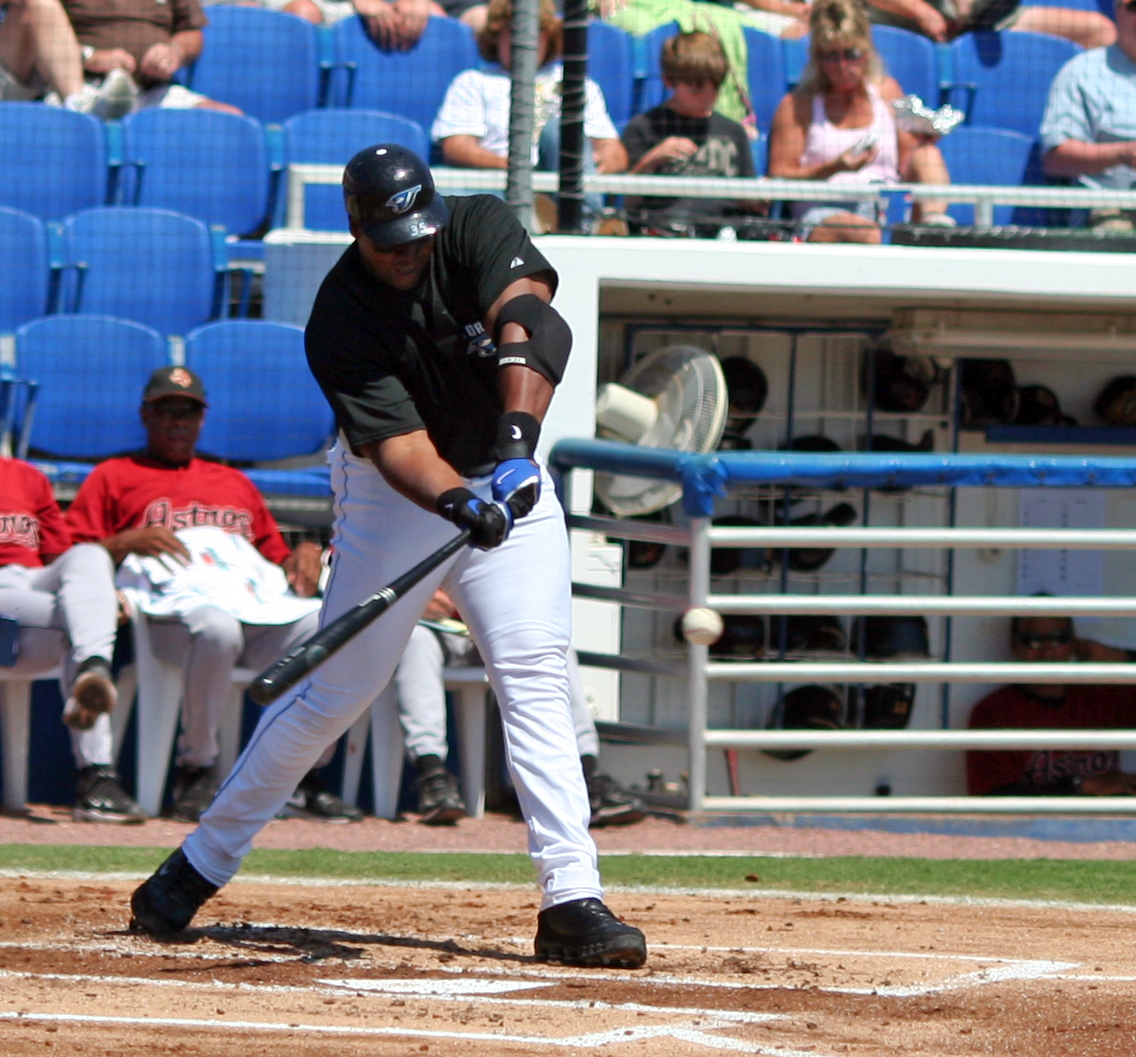
2014 BBWAA inductees (L-R): Greg Maddux, Tom Glavine, and Frank Thomas

Elections to the Baseball Hall of Fame for 2014 proceeded according to rules most recently revised in July 2010. As in the past, the Baseball Writers' Association of America (BBWAA) voted by mail to select from a ballot of recently retired players, with results announced on January 8, 2014. The Expansion Era Committee, one of three voting panels that replaced the more broadly defined Veterans Committee following the July 2010 rules change, convened early in December 2013 to select from a ballot of retired players and non-playing personnel who made their greatest contributions to the sport after 1972, a time frame that the Hall of Fame calls the "Expansion Era".

The induction class consisted of managers Bobby Cox, Tony La Russa, and Joe Torre, elected by the Expansion Era Committee, and Greg Maddux, Tom Glavine, and Frank Thomas, elected by the BBWAA.

The induction ceremonies were held on July 27, 2014, at the Hall of Fame in Cooperstown, New York. On the day before the actual induction ceremony, the annual Hall of Fame Awards Presentation took place. At that event, the Hall presented two awards for media excellence—its own Ford C. Frick Award for broadcasters and the BBWAA's J. G. Taylor Spink Award for writers. In addition, the Buck O'Neil Lifetime Achievement Award was also handed out; under the rules for that award, last presented in 2011, it may be presented no more frequently than every third year.

== BBWAA election ==
Key
	Elected to the Hall of Fame on this ballot (named in **bold italics**).
	Elected subsequently, as of 2026 (named in plain italics).
	Renominated for the 2015 BBWAA election by adequate performance on this ballot and has not been elected, as of 2026.
	Eliminated from annual BBWAA consideration by poor performance or expiration on this ballot and has not been elected, as of 2026.
†	First time on the BBWAA ballot.
*	Eliminated from annual BBWAA consideration by poor performance or expiration on this ballot.

The BBWAA ballot was announced on November 26, 2013. The BBWAA was authorized to elect players active in 1994 or later, but not after 2008; the ballot included the following categories of players:

- Candidates from the 2013 ballot who received at least 5% of the vote but were not elected, as long as their first appearance on the BBWAA ballot was in 2000 or later.
- Individuals chosen by a screening committee whose last game appearance was in or before 2008.

All 10-year members of the BBWAA were eligible to vote, and had until December 31, 2013, to return their ballots to the Hall.

The ballot consisted of 17 of the 18 candidates who received at least 5% of the vote in the 2013 election, plus 19 first-time candidates. (The other candidate who received 5% or more of the 2013 vote, Dale Murphy, dropped off the ballot after 15 years.) Voters were instructed to cast votes for up to 10 candidates. Under BBWAA rules, write-in votes were not permitted.

Results of the 2013 election by the BBWAA were announced on January 8, 2014. A total of 571 ballots were cast (including one ballot which supported no candidates), with 429 votes required for election. A total of 4,793 individual votes were cast, an average of 8.39 per ballot—the highest per-ballot average since 1960 (8.51 votes per ballot), the first per-ballot average of 8 or higher since 1983 (8.36), and the first per-ballot average of even 7 or higher since 1986 (7.04). According to former BBWAA president Bill Shaiklin, 50% of all voters filled out all 10 available slots on their ballots, up from 22% in 2013. Any candidate who received votes on at least 75% of the ballots would be inducted. Those candidates who received less than 5% of the vote will not appear on future BBWAA ballots, but may eventually be considered by the Veterans Committee.

Candidates who were eligible for the first time are indicated with a dagger (†). The candidates who received at least 75% of the vote and were elected are indicated in bold italics; candidates selected in subsequent elections, if any, will be indicated in italics.

Jack Morris was on the ballot for the 15th and final time.

Player	Votes (571 cast)	Percent	Change	Year
**Greg Maddux**†	555	97.2%	–	1st
**Tom Glavine**†	525	91.9%	–	1st
**Frank Thomas**†	478	83.7%	–	1st
Craig Biggio	427	74.8%	▲6.6%	2nd
Mike Piazza	355	62.2%	▲4.4%	2nd
Jack Morris	351	61.5%	▼6.2%	15th
Jeff Bagwell	310	54.3%	▼5.3%	4th
Tim Raines	263	46.1%	▼6.1%	7th
Roger Clemens	202	35.4%	▼2.2%	2nd
Barry Bonds	198	34.7%	▼1.5%	2nd
Lee Smith	171	29.9%	▼17.9%	12th
Curt Schilling	167	29.2%	▼9.6%	2nd
Edgar Martínez	144	25.2%	▼10.7%	5th
Alan Trammell	119	20.8%	▼12.8%	13th
Mike Mussina†	116	20.3%	–	1st
Jeff Kent†	87	15.2%	–	1st
Fred McGriff	67	11.7%	▼9.0%	5th
Mark McGwire	63	11.0%	▼5.8%	8th
Larry Walker	58	10.2%	▼11.4%	4th
Don Mattingly	47	8.2%	▼5.0%	14th
Sammy Sosa	41	7.2%	▼5.3%	2nd
Rafael Palmeiro*	25	4.4%	▼4.4%	4th
Moisés Alou†*	6	1.1%	–	1st
Hideo Nomo†*	6	1.1%	–	1st
Luis Gonzalez†*	5	0.9%	–	1st
Éric Gagné†*	2	0.4%	–	1st
J. T. Snow†*	2	0.4%	–	1st
Armando Benítez†*	1	0.2%	–	1st
Jacque Jones†*	1	0.2%	–	1st
Kenny Rogers†*	1	0.2%	–	1st
Sean Casey†*	0	0.0%	–	1st
Ray Durham†*	0	0.0%	–	1st
Todd Jones†*	0	0.0%	–	1st
Paul Lo Duca†*	0	0.0%	–	1st
Richie Sexson†*	0	0.0%	–	1st
Mike Timlin†*	0	0.0%	–	1st

The newly eligible candidates included 28 All-Stars, 12 of whom were not on the ballot, representing a total of 83 All-Star selections. Among the candidates were 10-time All-Star and 2-time Cy Young Award winner Tom Glavine, 8-time All-Star and 4-time Cy Young Award winner Greg Maddux, 6-time All-Star Moisés Alou, 5-time All-Star and 2-time MVP Award winner Frank Thomas, 5-time All-Star and 1-time MVP Award winner Jeff Kent, and 5-time All-Stars Luis Gonzalez. The field included 1995 NL Rookie of the Year Hideo Nomo, two MVPs (Kent and Thomas), three Cy Young Award winners (Glavine, Maddux and Éric Gagné). The field included four candidates with at least five Gold Glove Awards: Maddux (18 at pitcher, a record), Mussina (7 at pitcher), Kenny Rogers (5 at pitcher) and J. T. Snow (6 at first base).

As in most recent elections, it was expected that the controversy over use of performance-enhancing drugs (PEDs) was likely to dominate the elections. ESPN.com columnist Jim Caple noted in the days before the announcement of the 2012 results that the PED issue and the BBWAA's limit of 10 votes per ballot was likely to result in a major backlog in upcoming elections:

Due to the steroid issue and a general lack of consensus, the following players will probably be on the ballot in three years: Barry Bonds, Roger Clemens, Pedro Martinez, Randy Johnson, Sammy Sosa, Jeff Bagwell, John Smoltz, Edgar Martinez, Mark McGwire, Mike Mussina, Jeff Kent, Larry Walker, Alan Trammell, Fred McGriff, Rafael Palmeiro, Lee Smith, Tim Raines, Gary Sheffield, Mike Piazza, Curt Schilling and, of course, Bernie [Williams]. That's 21 players who warrant serious consideration. And that's not counting Barry Larkin, who might be [Ed. – and was] elected this year, and also assuming Greg Maddux, Tom Glavine, Craig Biggio and Frank Thomas make it their first years on the ballot. Finding room for Bonds, Clemens, Pedro, Johnson and others means I'll have to dump more good players from my ballot than the Marlins dumped after winning the 1997 World Series.

Several other players returning from the 2013 ballot with otherwise-strong Hall credentials have been linked to PEDs, among them Mark McGwire (who admitted to long-term steroid use in 2010), Jeff Bagwell (who never tested positive, but was the subject of PED rumors during his career), and Rafael Palmeiro (who tested positive for stanozolol shortly after denying that he had ever used steroids).

Players who were eligible for the first time who were not included on the ballot were: Tony Armas Jr., Gary Bennett, Joe Borowski, Jose Cruz Jr., Mike DiFelice, Damion Easley, Scott Elarton, Shawn Estes, Sal Fasano, Keith Foulke, Scott Hatteberg, Geoff Jenkins, Jason Johnson, Ray King, Jon Lieber, Esteban Loaiza, Kent Mercker, Matt Morris, Trot Nixon, Abraham Nunez, Odalis Perez, Tomas Perez, Mark Redman, Alberto Reyes, Ricardo Rincon, Dave Roberts, Rudy Seanez, Shannon Stewart, Tanyon Sturtze, Mark Sweeney, Salomon Torres, Steve Trachsel, Javier Valentin, Jose Vidro, Daryle Ward, and Dmitri Young.

=== Controversies ===
Following the vote, a number of writers expressed concern about what they viewed as a flawed election process.

Jayson Stark of ESPN.com noted about this election,

It wasn't exactly a perfect day for any of us who care about this process, because it sledgehammered home this painful reminder of the enduring Hall of Fame crisis of the 21st century: We still have no idea how to resolve the fate of many of the greatest players of all time. Now do we?...Is this what we want -- a Hall that attempts to pretend that players who just happen to hold some of the greatest records in the entire record book are now invisible to the naked eye?

Jonah Keri, writing for the ESPN outlet Grantland, remarked,

Short of dropping the required share of the vote well below 75 percent, I think there's a good chance that the voters' failure to elect candidates who not only match but raise the bar on existing inductees has put us in an intractable position. That position will leave many obviously worthy players at the mercy of the Expansion Era Committee, or whatever the veterans committees will be called 10 or 12 years from now. And not to be overly dramatic about it, but there's a reasonable chance that some of those players will either never make it in or be dead by the time they do, the way Ron Santo was when he got his long-overdue induction.

It was also revealed that voter Dan Le Batard had allowed Deadspin to use his vote. The website was protesting the "absurd election process" by submitting to BBWAA the results from a poll of its readers. He was subsequently permanently stripped of his Hall of Fame voting privileges.

== Expansion Era Committee ==
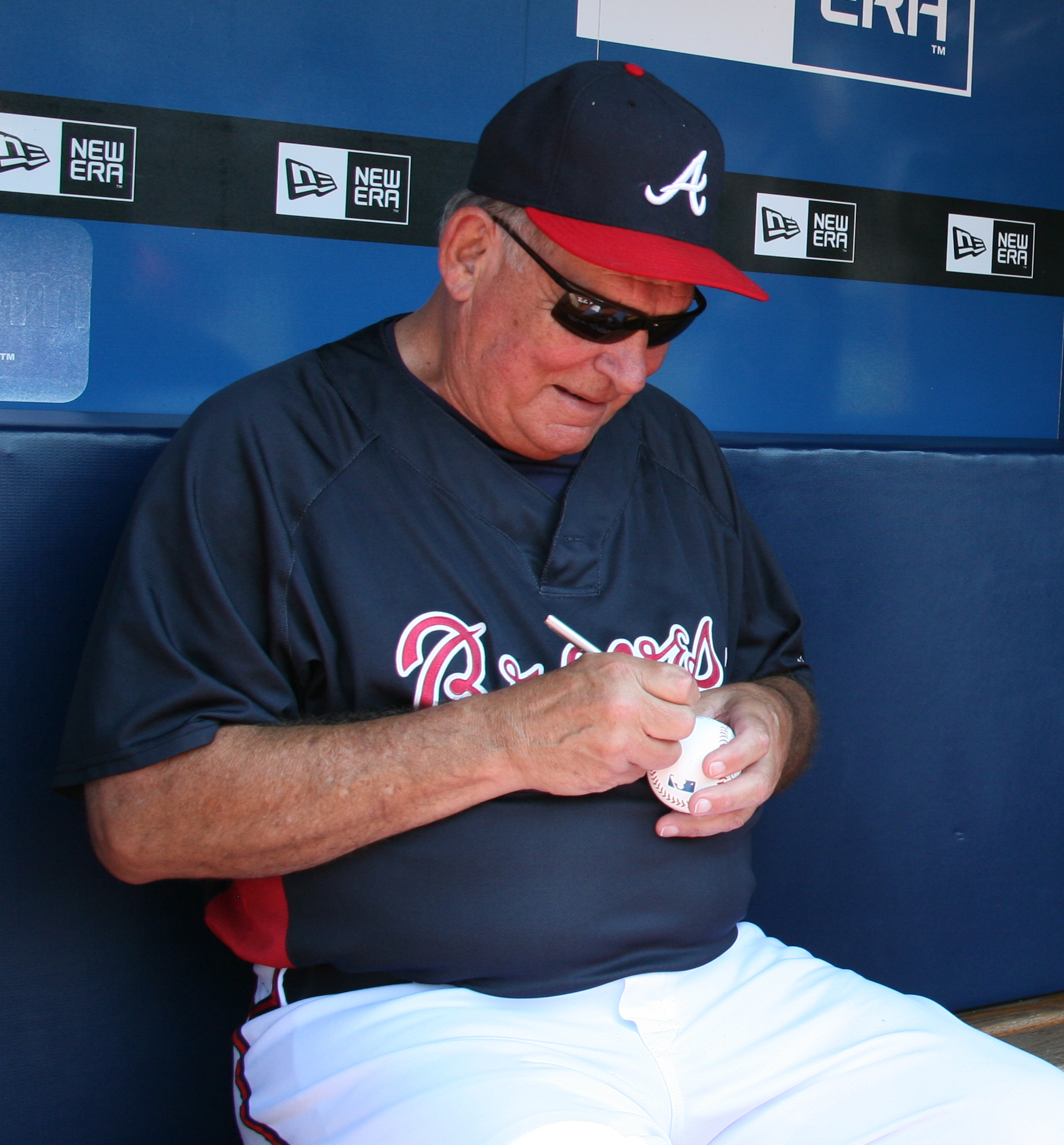
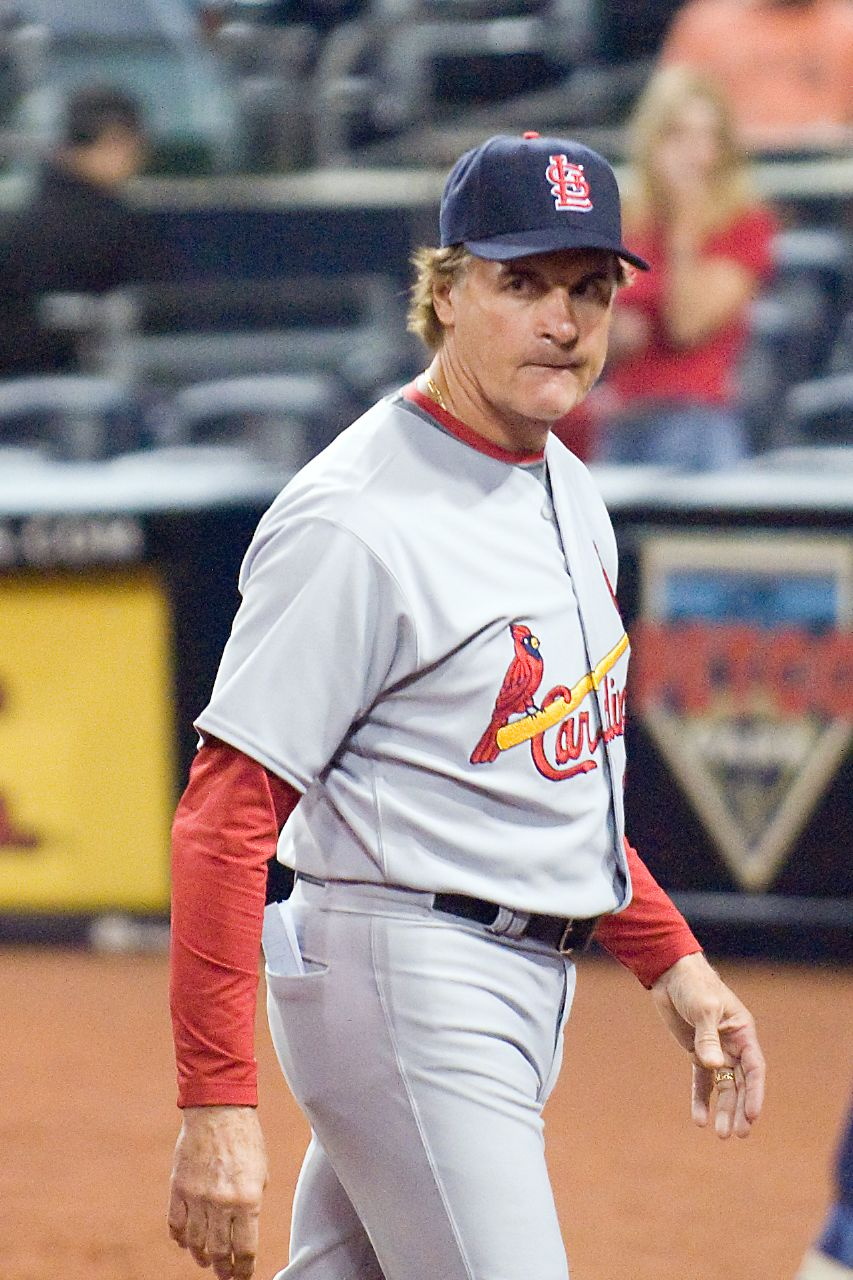
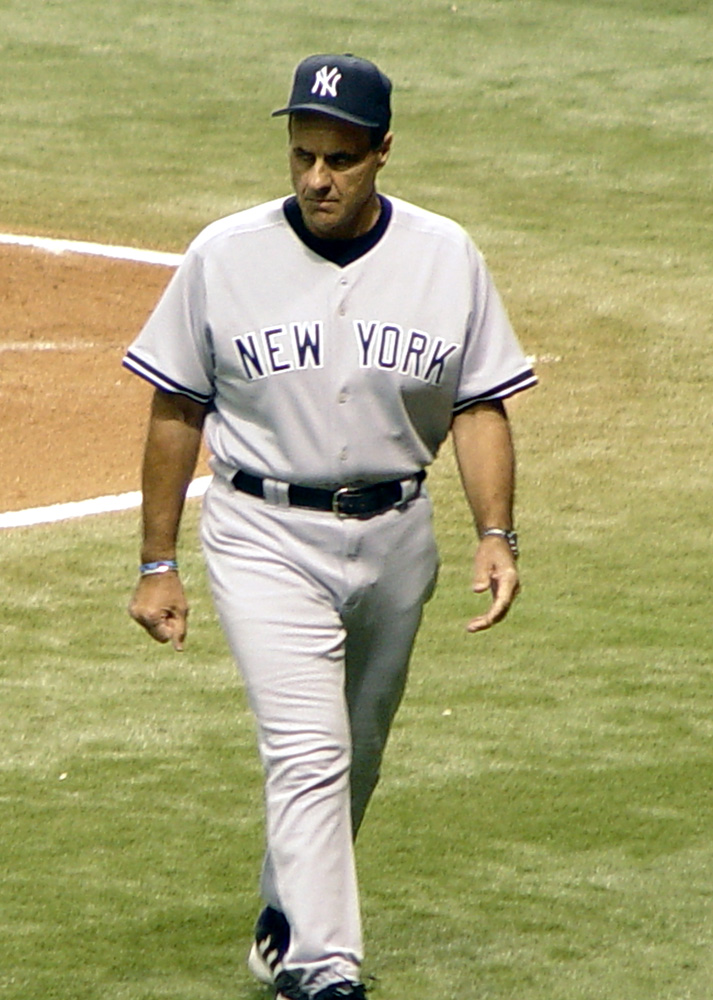
2014 Era Committee inductees (L-R): Bobby Cox, Tony La Russa, and Joe Torre

In keeping with the current voting procedure by eras, the BBWAA-appointed Historical Overview Committee, made up of 11 BBWAA members, identified 12 Expansion Era candidates who were judged to have made their greatest contributions after 1972; this group was previously considered in 2011. Although several managers and executives and one umpire from this period were selected between 1993 and 2011, no player from this period has yet been elected by any of the forms of the Veterans Committee. Along with the post-1972 era, these criteria defined the consideration set:

- Players who played in at least 10 major league seasons, who are not on Major League Baseball's ineligible list (e.g., Pete Rose), and have been retired for 16 or more seasons (players last active in 1997 or earlier);
- Managers and umpires with 10 or more years in baseball and retired for at least five years. Candidates who are 65 years or older are eligible six months following retirement;
- Executives retired for at least five years. Active executives 65 years or older are eligible for consideration.

The eleven BBWAA-appointed Historical Overview Committee members were Dave Van Dyck (Chicago Tribune); Bob Elliott (Toronto Sun); Steve Hirdt (Elias Sports Bureau); Rick Hummel (St. Louis Post-Dispatch); Bill Madden (New York Daily News); Ken Nigro (formerly The Baltimore Sun); Jack O'Connell (BBWAA secretary/treasurer); Tracy Ringolsby (Fox Sports Rocky Mountain/MLB.com); Glenn Schwarz (formerly San Francisco Chronicle); Claire Smith (ESPN); and Mark Whicker (Orange County Register).

The ballot for election by the Expansion Era Committee was released on November 4, 2013, and the Hall of Fame announced the results on December 9. The cutoff for election and summer 2014 induction remains the standard 75%, or 12 of 16 votes.

Candidate	Category	Votes	Percent	Ref
Bobby Cox	Manager	16	100%	
Tony La Russa	Manager	16	100%	
Joe Torre	Manager	16	100%	
Dave Concepción	Player	<6		
Steve Garvey	Player	<6		
Tommy John	Player	<6		
Billy Martin	Manager	<6		
Marvin Miller	Executive	<6		
Dave Parker	Player	<6		
Dan Quisenberry	Player	<6		
Ted Simmons	Player	<6		
George Steinbrenner	Executive	<6		

Dave Concepcion, Steve Garvey, Tommy John, Billy Martin, Marvin Miller, Dave Parker, Dan Quisneberry, Ted Simmons and George Steinbrenner each received six or fewer votes.

The Expansion Era Committee's 16-member voting electorate, appointed by the Hall of Fame's Board of Directors, was announced at the same time as the ballot of 12 candidates. The Hall officially calls this group the "Expansion Era Committee", but media still generally refer to it as the "Veterans Committee".

- Hall of Famers: Rod Carew, Carlton Fisk, Whitey Herzog, Tommy Lasorda, Joe Morgan, Paul Molitor, Phil Niekro, Frank Robinson
- Executives: Paul Beeston, Andy MacPhail, Dave Montgomery, Jerry Reinsdorf
- Media and historians: Steve Hirdt, Bruce Jenkins, Jack O'Connor, Jim Reeves

Players eligible for the first time who were not named on the ballot include Bob Boone, Bill Buckner, Dwight Evans, Keith Hernandez, Fred Lynn, Dale Murphy, Willie Randolph and Frank White. Other first-time eligibles who did not appear on the ballot include manager Lou Piniella and umpire Ed Montague.

Following the election, ESPN columnist Rick Reilly accused the committee members of hypocrisy, believing they did not follow the same standard for managers who had alleged or confirmed PED users on their teams as many BBWAA members used in refusing to vote for the same players. Reilly was especially critical of La Russa's election, claiming he "did more for juicers than Jack LaLanne", and added (emphasis in original):

In all, the three managers being inducted oversaw at least 34 players who've been implicated as PED users and never noticed a thing wrong. You could build a wing with the admitted and suspected drug cheats they won with: A-Rod, Roger Clemens (Torre), Jason Giambi, Jose Canseco (Torre and La Russa), Mark McGwire (La Russa), Melky Cabrera (Torre and Cox), David Justice (Torre and Cox), Andy Pettitte (Torre), Manny Ramirez (Torre with the Dodgers) and [Gary] Sheffield (Torre and Cox). If we get really lucky, maybe disgraced HGH pitcher Darren Holmes will show up. He played under all three of them! It's just another year in the Hall of Farce, where the codes of conduct shift like beach sand; where the rules for one set of men are ignored for another; where PED poppers can never enter, but the men who turned their backs to the cheating get gleaming, bronze plaques. . . . But for the expansion error committee to let these three managers in — unanimously, no less — after winning hundreds of games with better chemistry is the gold standard of double standards.

== J. G. Taylor Spink Award ==
The J. G. Taylor Spink Award has been presented by the BBWAA at the annual summer induction ceremonies since 1962. Through 2010, it was awarded during the main induction ceremony, but is now given the previous day at the Hall of Fame Awards Presentation. It recognizes a sportswriter "for meritorious contributions to baseball writing". The recipients are not members of the Hall of Fame but are featured in a permanent exhibit at the National Baseball Museum.

The three nominees for the 2014 award, selected by a BBWAA committee, were announced at the BBWAA's annual All-Star Game meeting on July 16, 2013. They were Roger Angell, longtime essayist for The New Yorker; the late Furman Bisher, longtime columnist for the Atlanta Journal-Constitution; and Mel Durslag, former columnist for the Los Angeles Herald Examiner. Under BBWAA rules, the winner was to be announced either during the 2013 World Series or at the 2013 winter meetings; in recent years, the announcement has been made at the winter meetings.

On December 10, the Hall announced Angell as the recipient. He received 258 votes from a total of 451 ballots, including four blanks. Bisher received 115 votes and Durslag 74. Angell, who was 93 at the time of announcement, is the first Spink Award recipient to have never been a member of the BBWAA; according to the Hall, the group "limits its membership to writers covering Major League Baseball for daily newspapers, wire services and some Internet outlets." However, the award is not restricted to BBWAA members, and Angell was nominated by the group's San Francisco Bay Area chapter. Angell has written about baseball for The New Yorker for over 50 years, and many of his essays for the magazine have been reprinted in several best-selling books spanning four decades.

== Ford C. Frick Award ==
The Ford C. Frick Award, honoring excellence in baseball broadcasting, has been presented at the induction ceremonies since 1978. Through 2010, it had been presented at the main induction ceremony, but is now awarded at the Awards Presentation. Recipients are not members of the Hall of Fame but are permanently recognized in an exhibit at the museum. To be eligible, an active or retired broadcaster must have a minimum of 10 years of continuous major league broadcast service with a ball club, a network, or a combination of the two. The honor is based on four criteria: longevity; continuity with a club; honors, including national assignments such as the World Series and All-Star Games; and popularity with fans. The recipient was announced during the 2013 winter meetings on December 11, following a vote by a 20-member committee composed of the living recipients along with broadcasting historians and columnists.

Beginning with this year's election, the selection process underwent major changes similar to those instituted for Veterans Committee balloting in 2010. Candidates are now considered every third year, based on the era in which they made their most significant contributions:

- "High Tide Era" — Mid-1980s to present, including the rise of regional cable networks. Individuals from this era were considered for the 2014 award.
- "Living Room Era" — Mid-1950s to early 1980s, including the rise of television. Individuals from this era were later considered for the 2015 award.
- "Broadcasting Dawn Era" — 1920s to early 1950s, including the early radio broadcasters. Individuals from this era were later considered for the 2016 award.

Also, the committee that selects the final recipient no longer has a role in determining any of the finalists. In previous years, the selection committee also chose seven of the 10 finalists, but that role has now been given to a Hall of Fame research committee.

Ten finalists from the "High Tide Era" were announced on October 2, 2013. In accord with the new guidelines, seven were chosen by a Hall of Fame research committee. Three were selected from a list of candidates by fan voting at the Hall's Facebook page from September 9 to September 30.

- Committee selections:
  - Joe Castiglione
  - Ken Harrelson
  - Eric Nadel
  - Eduardo Ortega
  - Mike Shannon
  - Dewayne Staats
  - Pete Van Wieren
- Fan selections:
  - Jacques Doucet
  - Bill King
  - Duane Kuiper

All finalists except King were living when the ballot was announced; the only living finalist who was not active was Van Wieren (who would die six days after the induction ceremony).

On December 11, Nadel was announced as the recipient. He has been a radio broadcaster for the Texas Rangers since 1979. and has been the team's lead radio voice since 1985. Nadel became the first broadcaster associated primarily with the Rangers to receive the award.

== Buck O'Neil Lifetime Achievement Award ==
Another Hall of Fame honor, the Buck O'Neil Lifetime Achievement Award, was also presented at the 2014 Awards Presentation. The award was created in 2008 in honor of Buck O'Neil, a Negro leagues star who went on to become one of baseball's leading ambassadors until his death in 2006. The first award was presented posthumously to O'Neil at the 2008 induction ceremony, and the second was given to veteran baseball executive Roland Hemond in 2011. According to the Hall,

The Buck O'Neil Lifetime Achievement Award is presented by the Hall of Fame's Board of Directors not more than once every three years to honor an individual whose extraordinary efforts enhanced baseball's positive impact on society, broadened the game's appeal, and whose character, integrity and dignity are comparable to the qualities exhibited by O'Neil.

As with the media awards, recipients are not members of the Hall of Fame but are permanently recognized by the Hall. In this case, the recipients are listed alongside a life-size statue of O'Neil that stands at the entrance to the museum. Written nominations for the award are accepted by mail at any time; the nomination must specifically state how the nominee meets the traits exemplified by O'Neil.

On December 4, 2013, the Hall announced that Joe Garagiola would be the 2014 recipient. Garagiola, a former player and broadcaster who received the Frick Award in 1991, is a founder of two organizations that, according to the Hall, "impact baseball in a positive manner"—the Baseball Assistance Team, which has distributed over $28 million in grants to needy members of the professional baseball community since the organization's formation in 1986, and the National Spit Tobacco Education Program, devoted to education on the dangers of smokeless tobacco.
