= 2011 Baseball Hall of Fame balloting =

Elections to the Baseball Hall of Fame

National Baseball

Hall of Fame and Museum
- New inductees: 3
- via BBWAA: 2
- via Expansion Era Committee: 1
- Total inductees: 295
- Induction date: July 24, 2011

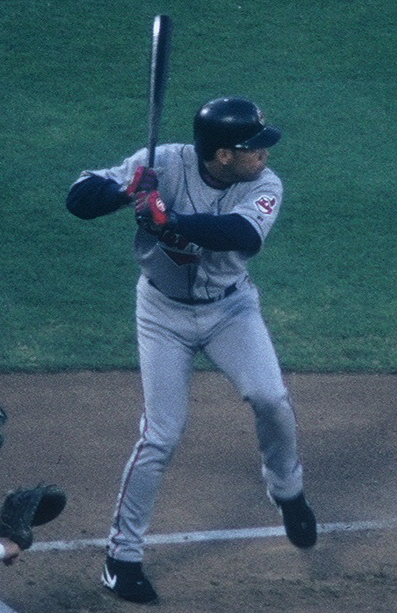
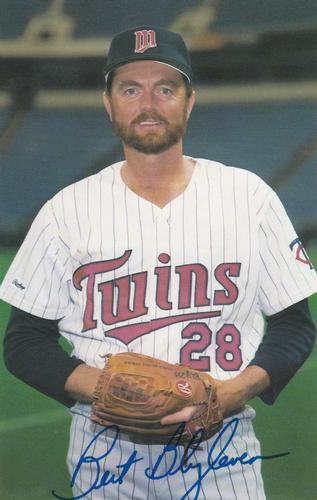
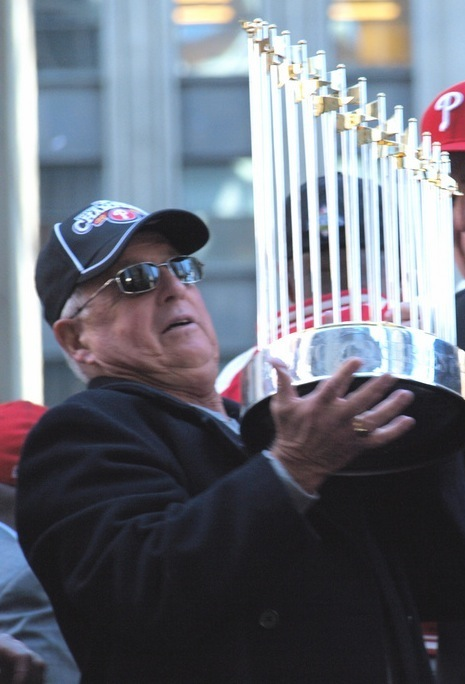
2011 inductees (L-R): Roberto Alomar, Bert Blyleven, and Pat Gillick

Elections to the National Baseball Hall of Fame for 2011 proceeded according to the rules revised in July 2010. As in the past, the Baseball Writers' Association of America (BBWAA) voted by mail to select from a ballot of recently retired players. The new Expansion Era Committee, which replaced the Veterans Committee, convened in December 2010 to select from an Expansion Era ballot of long-retired players and non-playing personnel who made their greatest contributions to the sport from 1973 to the present time, called the "Expansion Era" by the Hall of Fame.

The Hall of Fame induction class of 2011 consisted of players Roberto Alomar and Bert Blyleven, elected by the BBWAA, and executive Pat Gillick, elected by the committee, who formally entered the Hall on July 24, 2011, at the Hall of Fame in Cooperstown, New York.

For the first time, the Hall of Fame extended its induction festivities over a weekend. On the day before the main induction ceremony, the Hall of Fame hosted the first Hall of Fame Awards Presentation. Two annual awards for media excellence, the Hall's own Ford C. Frick Award for broadcasters and the BBWAA's J. G. Taylor Spink Award for writers, were presented at this ceremony. The irregularly presented Buck O'Neil Lifetime Achievement Award was also included in the ceremony. Previously, these awards were presented at the actual induction ceremony.

== BBWAA election ==
The BBWAA ballot was announced on November 29, 2010. The BBWAA was again authorized to elect players active in 1991 or later, but not after 2005; the ballot included candidates from the 2010 ballot who received at least 5% of the vote but were not elected, along with selected players, chosen by a screening committee, whose last appearance was in 2005. All 10-year members of the BBWAA were eligible to vote.

Results of the 2011 election by the BBWAA were announced on January 5, 2011. The writers' ballot consisted of 33 players–14 candidates returning from the 2010 ballot, plus 19 first-time candidates, the most since the 1991 ballot's 24 newcomers. Voters were instructed to cast votes for up to 10 candidates; any candidate who received votes on at least 75% of the ballots would be honored with induction to the Hall. Write-in votes were not permitted.

A record 581 ballots were cast (including five ballots which supported no candidates), with 436 votes required for election. A total of 3,474 individual votes were cast, an average of 5.98 per ballot. Any candidate who received votes on at least 75% of the ballots would be inducted. Those candidates who received less than 5% of the vote will not appear on future BBWAA ballots, but may eventually be considered by the Expansion Committee.

Candidates who were eligible for the first time are indicated with a dagger (†). The candidates who received at least 75% of the vote and were elected are indicated in bold italics; candidates who have since been selected in subsequent elections are indicated in italics. The candidates who received less than 5% of the vote, thus becoming ineligible for future BBWAA consideration, are indicated with an asterisk (*).

Dave Parker was on the ballot for the 15th and final time.

Player	Votes	Percent	Change	Year
**Roberto Alomar**	523	90.0	▲16.3%	2nd
**Bert Blyleven**	463	79.7	▲5.5%	14th
Barry Larkin	361	62.1	▲10.5%	2nd
Jack Morris	311	53.5	▲1.2%	12th
Lee Smith	263	45.3	▼2.0%	9th
Jeff Bagwell†	242	41.7	–	1st
Tim Raines	218	37.5	▲7.1%	4th
Edgar Martínez	191	32.9	▼3.3%	2nd
Alan Trammell	141	24.3	▲1.9%	10th
Larry Walker†	118	20.3	–	1st
Mark McGwire	115	19.8	▼3.9%	5th
Fred McGriff	104	17.9	▼3.6%	2nd
Dave Parker	89	15.3	▲0.1%	15th
Don Mattingly	79	13.6	▼2.5%	11th
Dale Murphy	73	12.6	▲0.9%	13th
Rafael Palmeiro†	64	11.0	–	1st
Juan González†	30	5.2	–	1st
Harold Baines*	28	4.8	▼1.3%	5th
John Franco†*	27	4.6	–	1st
Kevin Brown†*	12	2.1	–	1st
Tino Martinez†*	6	1.0	–	1st
Marquis Grissom†*	4	0.7	–	1st
Al Leiter†*	4	0.7	–	1st
John Olerud†*	4	0.7	–	1st
B. J. Surhoff†*	2	0.3	–	1st
Bret Boone†*	1	0.2	–	1st
Benito Santiago†*	1	0.2	–	1st
Carlos Baerga†*	0	0.0	–	1st
Lenny Harris†*	0	0.0	–	1st
Bobby Higginson†*	0	0.0	–	1st
Charles Johnson†*	0	0.0	–	1st
Raúl Mondesí†*	0	0.0	–	1st
Kirk Rueter†*	0	0.0	–	1st

Key
	Elected to the Hall of Fame on this ballot (named in **bold italics**).
	Elected subsequently, as of 2026 (named in plain italics).
	Renominated for the 2012 BBWAA election by adequate performance on this ballot and has not been elected, as of 2026.
	Eliminated from annual BBWAA consideration by poor performance or expiration on this ballot and has not been elected, as of 2026.
†	First time on the BBWAA ballot.
*	Eliminated from annual BBWAA consideration by poor performance or expiration on this ballot.

The two candidates who earned Hall of Fame induction, Alomar and Blyleven, fell short of induction in 2010 by fewer than 10 votes—the first time in history that two candidates had done so in the same election.

The newly eligible candidates included 25 All-Stars, nine of whom were not on the writers' ballot, representing a total of 60 All-Star selections. Among the new candidates were 6-time All Star Kevin Brown, and 5-time All Stars Larry Walker and Benito Santiago. The field also included three Rookie-of-the-Year Award winners Jeff Bagwell, Raúl Mondesí and Santiago. Walker won seven Gold Glove Awards for the right field position. Juan González won six Silver Slugger Awards in the outfield.

The new candidates on the 2011 ballot included three MVP Award winners: Jeff Bagwell (1994 NL), Walker (1997 NL), and González (1996 and 1998 AL). Also eligible was Rafael Palmeiro, who recorded over 3000 hits and 500 home runs, which would typically foreshadow a first-ballot election; however, his candidacy has generated controversy due to his testing positive for steroids. Palmeiro has steadfastly maintained his innocence in the steroid controversy, stating that he must have tested positive due to a tainted B12 injection. Ongoing debate about the influence of steroids on the game in the 1990s was widely believed to have affected the vote totals for several power hitters on the ballot, including McGwire, Bagwell, Walker and Gonzalez, regardless of whether they had ever tested positive for steroid use or had even been accused of involvement with steroids; the top five vote-getters were either pitchers or middle infielders with relatively few home runs. Walker's candidacy was also affected by voters' assessment of his extreme home/away statistical splits, attributed by many to the fact that he spent slightly more than half his career with hitter's paradise Coors Field as his home park, though he also spent several years playing in the more pitching-friendly Olympic Stadium. Many candidates may simply have been seeking to remain on the ballot for 2012, when a generally weaker field of candidates is expected, with the most prominent new candidates including Bernie Williams, Rubén Sierra, Vinny Castilla, Eric Young, Tim Salmon, Brad Radke and Danny Graves.

Players who were eligible for the first time who were not included on the writers' ballot were: Terry Adams, Wilson Álvarez, Brian Anderson, James Baldwin, Pat Borders, Ricky Bottalico, Frank Castillo, Roger Cedeño, Jason Christiansen, Wil Cordero, Midre Cummings, Cal Eldred, John Flaherty, Buddy Groom, Jeffrey Hammonds, Dave Hansen, Félix Heredia, Denny Hocking, Al Levine, Luis López, Matt Mantei, Dave McCarty, Jim Mecir, Ramiro Mendoza, Mike Mordecai, Greg Myers, C. J. Nitkowski, José Offerman, Keith Osik, Antonio Osuna, Eddie Pérez, Jay Powell, Paul Quantrill, Steve Reed, Rey Sánchez, Ugueth Urbina, Ismael Valdez, Gabe White, Matt Whiteside, Gerald Williams and Dan Wilson. José Lima, who last played in the major leagues in 2006 and died on May 23, 2010, was eligible for consideration in this round of balloting – similar to the inclusion on the ballot of Darryl Kile and Rod Beck in 2003 and 2008 respectively – but was not placed on the ballot. Under Hall of Fame rules, an otherwise eligible player who dies before being retired 5 years becomes eligible in the first election held at least 6 months after his death.

== Expansion Era Committee ==
In keeping with the new Hall of Fame voting procedure, the Historical Overview Committee identified 12 Expansion Era candidates who were judged to have made their greatest contributions from 1973 to present. Along with the 1973 to present time era, these rules defined the consideration set:

- Players who played in at least 10 major league seasons, who are not on Major League Baseball's ineligible list (e.g., Pete Rose), and have been retired for 16 or more seasons (players last active in 1994 or earlier);
- Managers and umpires with 10 or more years in baseball and retired for at least five years. Candidates who are 65 years or older are eligible six months following retirement;
- Executives retired for at least five years. Active executives 65 years or older are eligible for consideration.

Historical Overview Committee (eleven veteran BBWAA members): Dave Van Dyck (Chicago Tribune); Bob Elliott (Toronto Sun); Rick Hummel (St. Louis Post-Dispatch); Steve Hirdt (Elias Sports Bureau); Moss Klein (formerly Newark Star-Ledger); Bill Madden (New York Daily News); Ken Nigro (formerly The Baltimore Sun); Jack O'Connell (BBWAA secretary/treasurer); Nick Peters (formerly Sacramento Bee); Tracy Ringolsby (FSN Rocky Mountain); and Mark Whicker (Orange County Register).

The Expansion Era ballot was originally scheduled for release in October but was delayed until November 8, 2010. The 12 Expansion Era Candidates were eight players, one manager, and three executives. The sole candidate who was elected is indicated in bold italics.

Candidate	Category	Votes	Percent
**Pat Gillick**	Executive	13	81.25%
Marvin Miller	Executive	11	68.75%
Dave Concepción	Player	8	50%
Vida Blue	Player	<8	
Steve Garvey	Player	<8	
Ron Guidry	Player	<8	
Tommy John	Player	<8	
Billy Martin	Manager	<8	
Al Oliver	Player	<8	
Ted Simmons	Player	<8	
Rusty Staub	Player	<8	
George Steinbrenner	Executive	<8	

All except Martin and Steinbrenner were living when the ballot and results were announced. Martin and Miller were holdovers from the most recent ballots covering managers and executives (2010), and Oliver was a holdover from the most recent ballot covering post-1942 players (2009).

The new Expansion Era Committee (16-members appointed by the Hall's board of directors) was announced at the same time as the final ballot:

- Hall of Famers: Johnny Bench, Whitey Herzog, Eddie Murray, Jim Palmer, Tony Pérez, Frank Robinson, Ryne Sandberg, Ozzie Smith
- Executives: Bill Giles, David Glass, Andy MacPhail, Jerry Reinsdorf
- Media: Bob Elliott, Tim Kurkjian, Ross Newhan, Tom Verducci

The Committee convened at the 2010 winter meetings in Orlando, Florida with the standard 75% or 12 of 16 votes required for election and July 2011 Hall of Fame induction. Results were announced at 10:00 am EST on December 6.

== J. G. Taylor Spink Award ==
The J. G. Taylor Spink Award has been presented by the BBWAA at the annual summer induction ceremonies since 1962. Through 2010, it was awarded during the main induction ceremony, but is now awarded the previous day. It recognizes a sportswriter "for meritorious contributions to baseball writing". The recipients are not members of the Hall of the Fame but are featured in a permanent exhibit at the National Baseball Museum.

The three nominees for the 2011 award were Bob Elliott of the Toronto Sun, Bill Conlin of the Philadelphia Daily News, and Joe Giuliotti of the Boston Herald. This was the third consecutive year Elliott had been nominated and the second for Giuliotti.

Under BBWAA rules, the winner was to be announced either during the 2010 World Series or at the 2010 winter meetings. The winner of the 2011 J. G. Taylor Spink Award, announced at the winter meetings, was Bill Conlin, who received 188 votes from the 434. Elliott received 160 votes. Joe Giuliotti got 83 votes. Three blank ballots were among those submitted.

== Ford C. Frick Award ==
The Ford C. Frick Award, honoring excellence in baseball broadcasting, has been presented at the induction ceremonies since 1978. Through 2010, it had been presented at the main induction ceremony, but is now presented the previous day. Recipients are not members of the Hall of Fame but are permanently recognized in an exhibit at the museum. To be eligible, an active or retired broadcaster must have a minimum of 10 years of continuous major league broadcast service with a ball club, a network, or a combination of the two. The honor is based on four criteria: longevity; continuity with a club; honors, including national assignments such as the World Series and All-Star Games; and popularity with fans. The recipient was announced on December 8, 2010, at the winter meetings, following a vote by the same committee that selected seven of the finalists (below).

Ten finalists were announced in October 2010. In accord with guidelines established in 2003, seven were chosen by a committee composed of the living recipients along with broadcasting historians and columnists. Three were selected from a list of candidate by fan voting in September 2010 at the Hall's Facebook page.

- Committee selections:
  - René Cárdenas
  - Dizzy Dean
  - Ned Martin
  - Tim McCarver
  - Graham McNamee
  - Eric Nadel
  - Dave Van Horne
- Fan selections:
  - Tom Cheek
  - Jacques Doucet
  - Bill King

Five candidates were living when the ballot was announced—the active McCarver, Nadel, and Van Horne; and the retired Cárdenas and Doucet.

On December 8, Dave Van Horne, the lead play-by-play announcer for the Florida Marlins (now Miami Marlins) on the team's radio network, was named as the recipient. He began his career with the Richmond Braves in the Triple-A International League before joining the English-language radio broadcast team for the Montreal Expos in their inaugural year of 1969. He remained with the Expos through 2000 before joining the Marlins in 2001. He also called the Expos' last home game in Montreal in 2004 as a member of the visiting Marlins broadcast team. He has also called games on The Baseball Network, and called three World Series and National League Championship Series for Canadian networks, in addition to the Marlins' 2003 World Series victory.

The Frick Award is Van Horne's second award for broadcasting excellence from a baseball hall of fame. In 1996, he received the Jack Graney Award, given irregularly for excellence in either writing or broadcasting, from the Canadian Baseball Hall of Fame. Van Horne became the second Frick Award winner, after 2009 recipient Tony Kubek, to have called games for a Canadian team, and also the second Marlins broadcaster to receive the Frick Award, after 2001 recipient Felo Ramírez.

== Buck O'Neil Lifetime Achievement Award ==
The Hall presented its Buck O'Neil Lifetime Achievement Award for the second time. The award was created in 2008 in honor of Buck O'Neil, a Negro leagues star who went on to become one of baseball's leading ambassadors until his death in 2006. The first award was presented posthumously to O'Neil at the 2008 induction ceremony. According to the Hall,

The Buck O'Neil Lifetime Achievement Award is presented by the Hall of Fame's Board of Directors not more than once every three years to honor an individual whose extraordinary efforts enhanced baseball's positive impact on society, broadened the game's appeal, and whose character, integrity and dignity are comparable to the qualities exhibited by O'Neil.

As with the media awards, recipients are not members of the Hall of Fame but are permanently recognized in an exhibit at the museum. The Hall accepts written nominations for the award by mail at any time; the nomination must specifically state how the nominee meets the traits exemplified by O'Neil.

Roland Hemond received the O'Neil Award at the Awards Presentation. He first came to prominence as the assistant scouting director of the Milwaukee Braves in the 1950s, and became the first scouting director of the Los Angeles Angels in 1961. From there, Hemond went on to be general manager of the Chicago White Sox and Baltimore Orioles, winning the MLB Executive of the Year Award three times (1972 and 1983 in Chicago, 1989 in Baltimore). He went to the newly created Arizona Diamondbacks as Senior Executive Vice President in 1996, seeing them through their MLB debut in 1998. Hemond returned to the White Sox as an adviser in 2001, and to the Diamondbacks in 2007 as a special assistant to the president, a position he still holds.

Outside the front office, Hemond is president of the Association of Professional Baseball Players of America, which provides financial and other assistance to individuals connected with professional baseball. He also helped found the Professional Baseball Scouts Foundation, a similar organization focused on assisting veteran scouts who need special support.
