= Ford C. Frick Award =

Annual award for baseball broadcasters

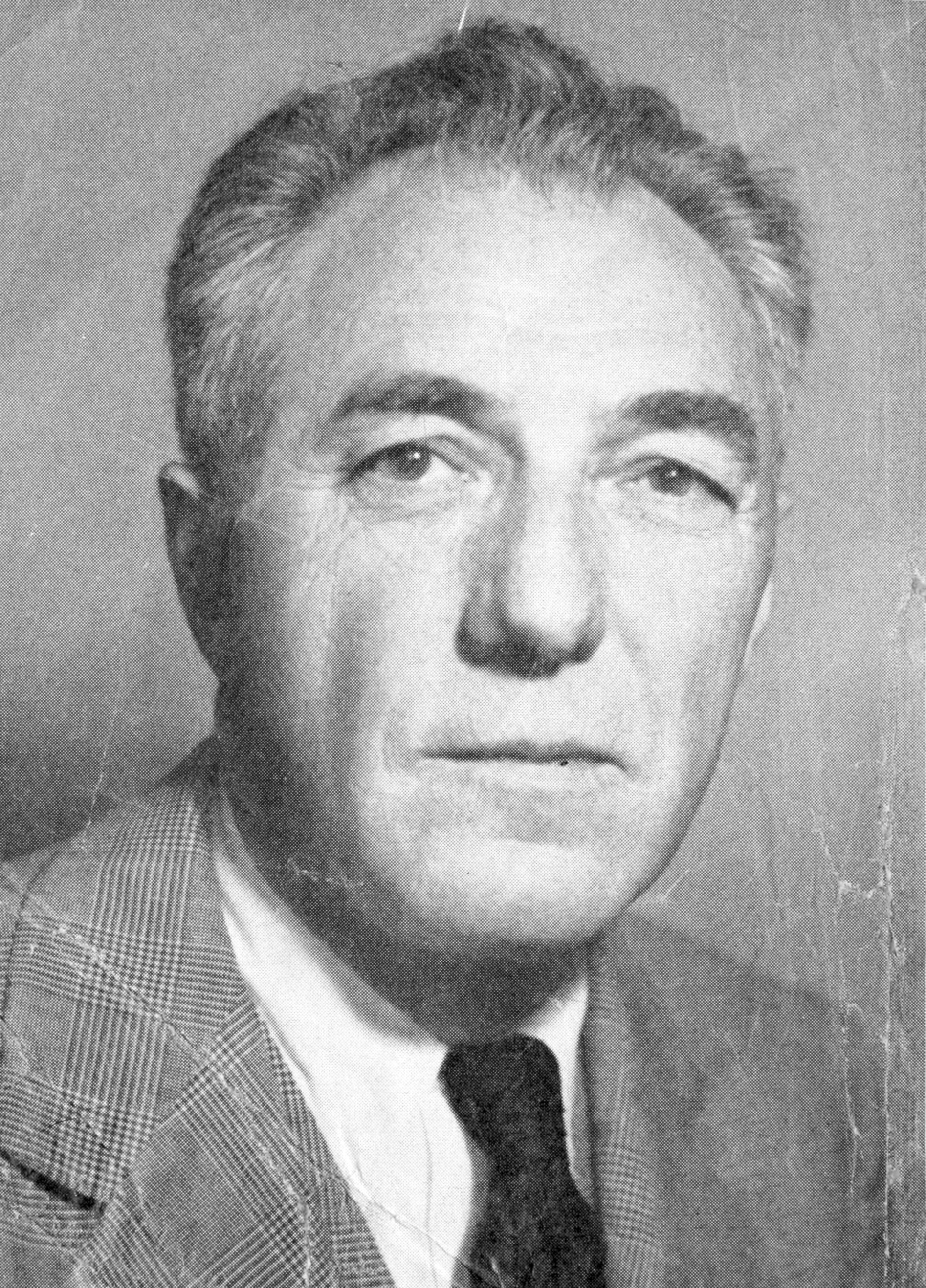
- Ford C. Frick, the award's namesake
- Sport: Baseball
- Awarded for: "Commitment to excellence, quality of broadcasting abilities, reverence within the game, popularity with fans, and recognition by peers."
- Location: Cooperstown, New York
- Presented by: National Baseball Hall of Fame

History
- First award: 1978
- First winner: Mel Allen
- Most recent: Joe Buck (2026)
- Website: Official website

The Ford C. Frick Award is presented annually by the Baseball Hall of Fame in the United States to a broadcaster for "major contributions to baseball". (Note: This award should not be confused with a like-named Ford C. Frick Award given to the Rookie of the Year in each league from 1965 into the 1970s.) It is named for Ford C. Frick, former commissioner of baseball. Before his career as an executive, Frick was a baseball writer and occasional broadcaster; he gained fame as a ghostwriter for Babe Ruth in the 1920s. The award was created in 1978, and renamed for Frick after his death that year.

Recipients of the award are "honorees" of the Hall of Fame, not members; they are not "inducted" or "enshrined", they are not "Hall of Fame broadcasters", and there is no "broadcasters' wing" of the Hall of Fame. The award is given at a separate ceremony from the induction ceremony on Hall of Fame weekend. As with recipients of the BBWAA Career Excellence Award for baseball writing, the honorees are permanently recognized in a "Scribes & Mikemen" exhibit in the Hall's library.

== Selection ==
Detail on the selection process for the award when it was first established is lacking.

From 2004 to 2016, fans were allowed to vote for three of the award's ten annual nominees; in the final years of fan voting, it was conducted on the Hall's Facebook page. Through 2013, seven candidates were selected by a committee consisting of previous Frick Award winners and broadcast historians and columnists, which also determined the final recipient. Beginning with the 2014 award, the final election committee no longer selected any of the finalists; that became the role of a Hall of Fame research committee.

=== 2014 changes ===
Other changes in the selection process were also announced for the 2014 award; these changes were similar to those instituted in 2010 for Veterans Committee balloting. From 2014 to 2016, candidates were considered every third year, based on the era in which they made their most significant contributions:

- "High Tide Era": Mid-1980s to present, including the rise of regional cable networks. Individuals from this era were considered for the 2014 award.
- "Living Room Era": Mid-1950s to early 1980s, reflecting the rise of television. Individuals from this era were considered for the 2015 award.
- "Broadcasting Dawn Era": Origin of broadcasting to early 1950s. Individuals from this era were first considered for the 2016 award.

=== 2017 changes ===
The Hall of Fame announced further changes to the selection process in 2016 that took effect immediately, with the first award affected by these changes being that for 2017. Fan voting was eliminated, and the final ballot was cut from 10 to 8. Candidates were still considered every third year, but in mostly different categories:

- "Current Major League Markets": Broadcasters who made their mark with one or more specific MLB teams. These individuals were first considered for the 2017 award.
- "National Voices": Broadcasters who made their contributions with national media. These individuals were first considered for the 2018 award.
- "Broadcasting Beginnings": Pioneers of baseball broadcasting, roughly covering the time span of the previous "Broadcasting Dawn Era". These individuals were first considered for the 2019 award.

=== 2022 changes ===
In April 2022, the Hall of Fame announced further changes to the Frick Award selection process. The size of the ballot was restored to 10 nominees, while also requiring that at least one candidate be a foreign-language broadcaster. The election cycle was also revised, effective with the 2023 balloting: four consecutive elections will have a composite ballot of local and national broadcasters, followed by one election for broadcasters whose careers ended before 1994 (the introduction of the Wild Card era). Thus, recipients will be selected per the following balloting rotation, which will then repeat:

- Composite ballot (local and national voices): 2023, 2024, 2025, 2026
- Pre-Wild Card Era ballot: 2027

=== Veterans Committee participation ===
For several years in the early 2000s, Frick Award honorees also became life members of the Veterans Committee, which considers candidates for Hall of Fame induction who are not eligible for the regular voting by the Baseball Writers' Association of America – specifically, players no longer on the BBWAA ballot and all non-players. However, starting with the 2008 elections, voting for players on the main Veterans Committee ballot was restricted to Hall of Fame members. After further changes announced for the 2011 elections, Frick Award winners became eligible to serve on the voting bodies that replaced the Veterans Committee that consider candidates from different eras of baseball.

== Recipients ==
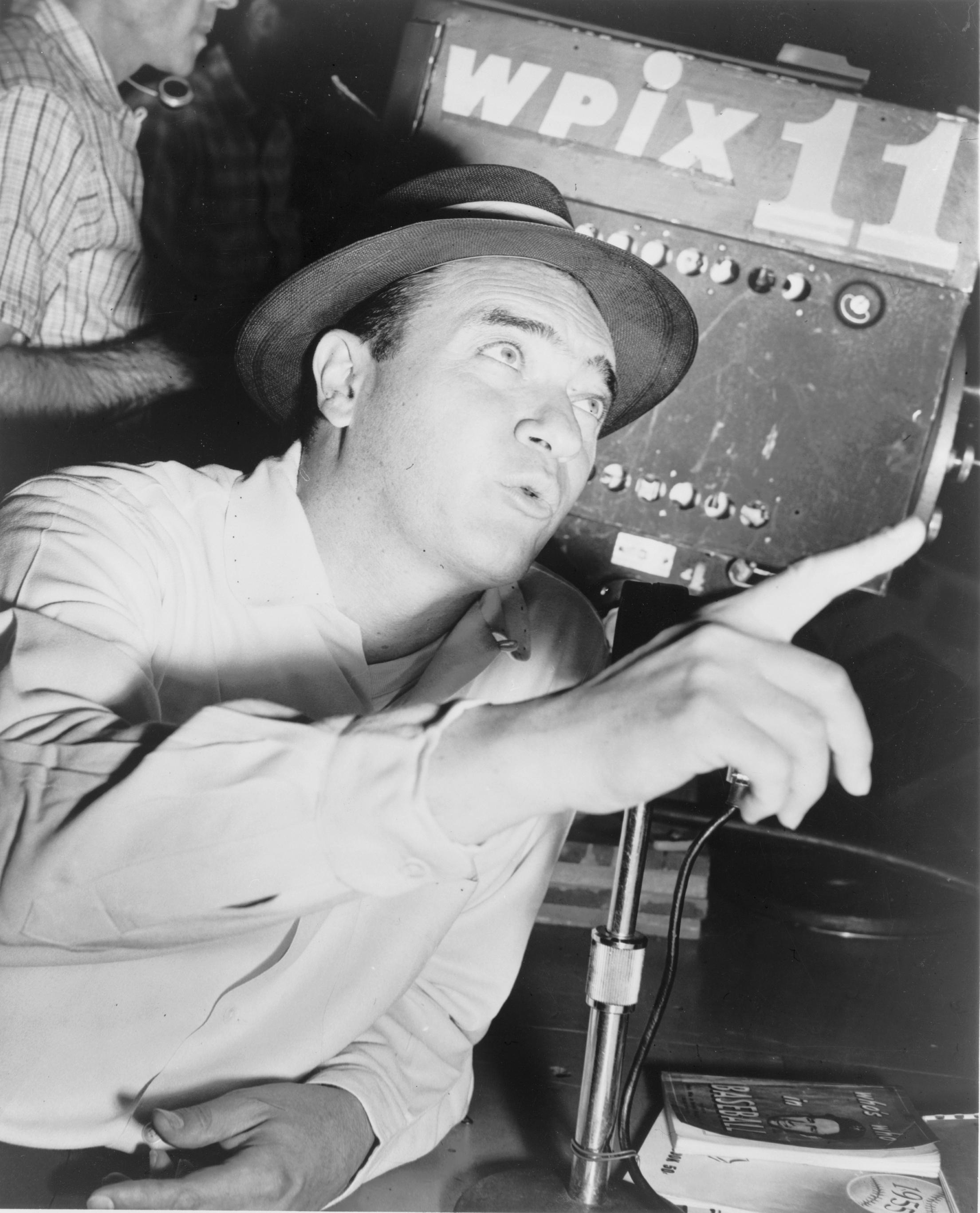
Mel Allen, 1978 co-recipient

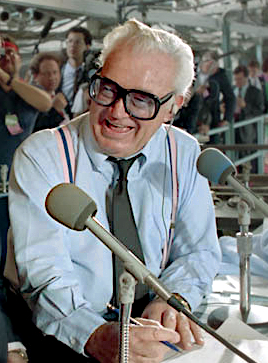
Harry Caray, 1989 recipient

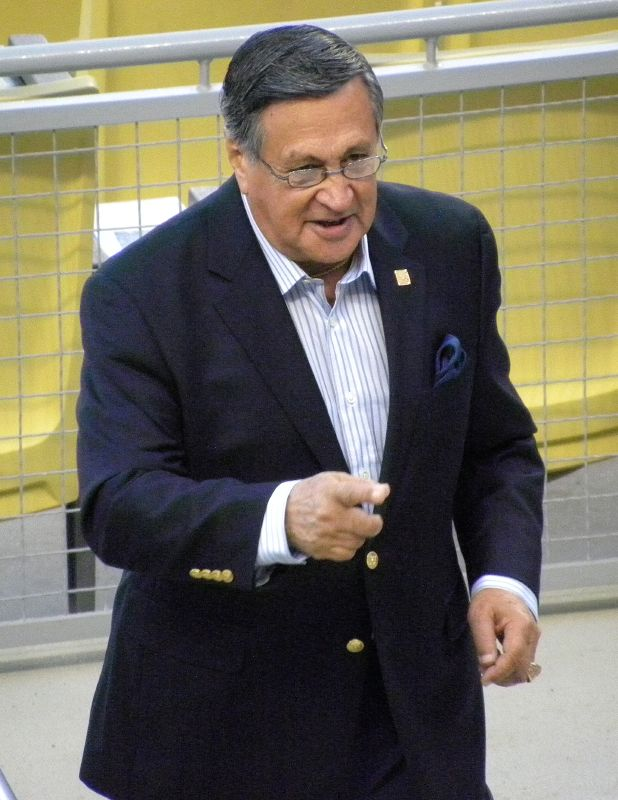
Jaime Jarrín, 1998 recipient

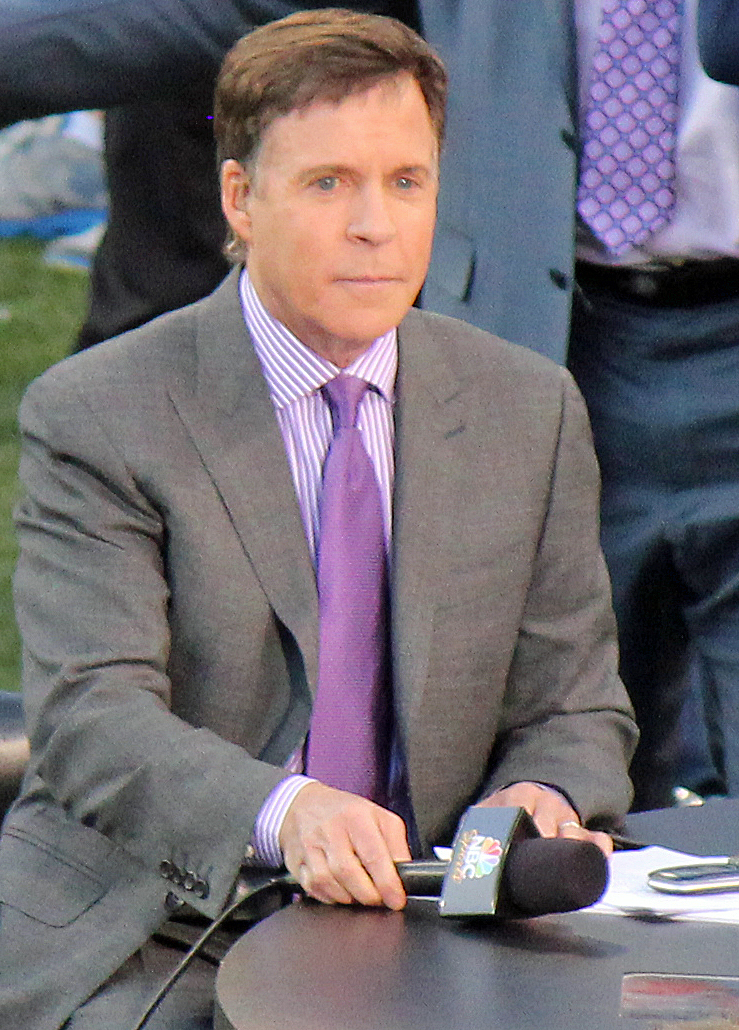
Bob Costas, 2018 recipient

Year	Honoree	Primary affiliation(s)
1978	Mel Allen	New York Yankees
1978	Red Barber	Brooklyn Dodgers, New York Yankees
1979	Bob Elson	Chicago White Sox, Chicago Cubs, Mutual
1980	Russ Hodges	New York/San Francisco Giants
1981	Ernie Harwell	Detroit Tigers
1982	Vin Scully	Brooklyn/Los Angeles Dodgers, NBC, CBS Radio
1983	Jack Brickhouse	Chicago Cubs, Chicago White Sox
1984	Curt Gowdy	Boston Red Sox, NBC
1985	Buck Canel	New York Yankees, New York Mets
1986	Bob Prince	Pittsburgh Pirates
1987	Jack Buck	St. Louis Cardinals, CBS
1988	Lindsey Nelson	New York Mets
1989	Harry Caray	St. Louis Cardinals, Chicago White Sox, Chicago Cubs
1990	By Saam	Philadelphia Phillies, Philadelphia Athletics
1991	Joe Garagiola	St. Louis Cardinals, NBC
1992	Milo Hamilton	Houston Astros
1993	Chuck Thompson	Baltimore Orioles
1994	Bob Murphy	New York Mets
1995	Bob Wolff	Washington Senators, NBC
1996	Herb Carneal	Minnesota Twins
1997	Jimmy Dudley	Cleveland Indians
1998	Jaime Jarrín	Los Angeles Dodgers
1999	Arch McDonald	Washington Senators
2000	Marty Brennaman	Cincinnati Reds
2001	Felo Ramírez	Florida Marlins
2002	Harry Kalas	Philadelphia Phillies
2003	Bob Uecker	Milwaukee Brewers, ABC, NBC
2004	Lon Simmons	San Francisco Giants, Oakland Athletics
2005	Jerry Coleman	San Diego Padres
2006	Gene Elston	Houston Astros, CBS Radio
2007	Denny Matthews	Kansas City Royals
2008	Dave Niehaus	Seattle Mariners
2009	Tony Kubek	Toronto Blue Jays, New York Yankees, NBC
2010	Jon Miller	Baltimore Orioles, San Francisco Giants, ESPN
2011	Dave Van Horne	Montreal Expos, Florida Marlins
2012	Tim McCarver	New York Mets, ABC, CBS, Fox
2013	Tom Cheek	Toronto Blue Jays
2014	Eric Nadel	Texas Rangers
2015	Dick Enberg	California Angels, San Diego Padres, NBC
2016	Graham McNamee	NBC Radio
2017	Bill King	Oakland Athletics
2018	Bob Costas	NBC, MLB Network
2019	Al Helfer	Brooklyn Dodgers, Mutual
2020	Ken Harrelson	Chicago White Sox
2021	Al Michaels	Cincinnati Reds, San Francisco Giants, ABC
2022	Jack Graney	Cleveland Indians
2023	Pat Hughes	Milwaukee Brewers, Chicago Cubs
2024	Joe Castiglione	Boston Red Sox
2025	Tom Hamilton	Cleveland Indians/Guardians
2026	Joe Buck	St. Louis Cardinals, Fox

== See also ==
- List of current Major League Baseball announcers
- List of sports journalism awards
- Curt Gowdy Media Award—the NBA's comparable award
- Foster Hewitt Memorial Award—the NHL's comparable award
- Pete Rozelle Radio-Television Award—the NFL's comparable award
- BBWAA Career Excellence Award—the National Baseball Hall of Fame's award for baseball writers
