= Joe Garagiola =

American baseball player (1926–2016)

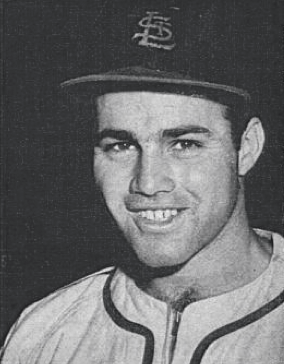
- Garagiola in 1947
- Catcher
- Born: February 12, 1926; St. Louis, Missouri, U.S.
- Died: March 23, 2016 (aged 90); Scottsdale, Arizona, U.S.
- Batted: Left Threw: Right

MLB debut
- May 26, 1946, for the St. Louis Cardinals

Last MLB appearance
- September 26, 1954, for the New York Giants

MLB statistics
- Batting average: .257
- Home runs: 42
- Runs batted in: 255
- Stats at Baseball Reference

Teams
- St. Louis Cardinals (1946–1951); Pittsburgh Pirates (1951–1953); Chicago Cubs (1953–1954); New York Giants (1954)

Career highlights and awards
- World Series champion (1946); Ford Frick Award (1991); St. Louis Walk of Fame; Buck O'Neil Lifetime Achievement Award (2014)
Military career
Allegiance	United States
Branch	United States Army
Service years	1944–1946
Conflicts	World War II; Pacific theater

Joseph Henry Garagiola Sr. (February 12, 1926 – March 23, 2016) was an American professional baseball catcher, and later a radio and television personality with a varied career.

He played nine seasons in Major League Baseball (MLB) for the St. Louis Cardinals, Pittsburgh Pirates, Chicago Cubs, and New York Giants. He was later well known outside baseball as one of the regular panelists on The Today Show, but he was best known for his many years as one of the lead baseball announcers on NBC, frequently amplifying, for comedic effect, remarks attributed to his old friend Yogi Berra (whether Berra had made them or not); he also made numerous appearances as a host and panelist on a range of talk and game shows.

== Early life ==
Born in St. Louis, Missouri, Garagiola grew up on Elizabeth Avenue in an Italian-American neighborhood in the south of the city called the Hill, just across the street from Yogi Berra, his childhood friend and competitor, who was a year older. As teenagers, almost all baseball scouts rated Garagiola the better prospect. Still, it was Berra who went on to a Hall of Fame career, while Garagiola was a journeyman. About living across the street from Berra during their youth, Garagiola often quipped, "Not only was I not the best catcher in the Major Leagues, I wasn't even the best catcher on my street!"

== Baseball career ==
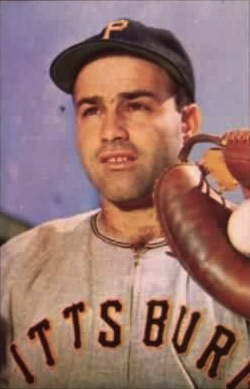
Garagiola with the Pirates

Garagiola was signed at age 16 by the St. Louis Cardinals organization. At age 17, he remains the youngest player in Columbus Red Birds history. Garagiola advanced to Columbus of the Class AA American Association in 1943 and was with them when he was drafted into military service on April 24, 1944. After undergoing basic training at Jefferson Barracks, Missouri, Garagiola was sent to Fort Riley, Kansas, where he quickly established himself as the catcher for the Fort Riley Centaurs, with teammates Rex Barney and Pete Reiser.

Garagiola was sent to the Philippines in 1945, where he played ball for Kirby Higbe's Manila Dodgers. He was discharged from service in early 1946 and was just 20 years old when he joined the Cardinals. Garagiola made his major league debut in 1946.

As a rookie in 1946, in his only World Series appearance, Garagiola batted 6-for-19 in five games, including in Game 4, when he went 4-for-5 with three RBIs. On September 11, 1947, Joe Garagiola and Jackie Robinson were involved in an incident at home plate. Garagiola allegedly spiked Robinson's foot in the second inning, and when Robinson came to the plate the next inning and made a comment to him, Garagiola reportedly responded with a racial slur. An argument ensued and umpire Beans Reardon held back Garagiola while Robinson responded with a mock clap.

Garagiola never quite lived up to the promise of his youth, appearing in only 676 games over nine seasons for four National League teams. He was a mediocre hitter (though certainly good for a catcher) in the majors, which featured in his self-deprecating humor. He once told this story himself: "He knew that it was time to retire when he was catching, and his ex-teammate Stan Musial stepped into the batter's box, turned to Joe, and said, 'When are you gonna quit?'"

Looking back at his career in 1970, Garagiola observed, "It's not a record, but being traded four times when there are only eight teams in the league tells you something. I thought I was modeling uniforms for the National League."

== After baseball ==
=== Books ===
After his retirement from baseball, Garagiola lent his name to a 1960 book, Baseball Is a Funny Game, which sold well upon release and helped establish Garagiola as a "personality." The book—largely ghostwritten—was a collection of humorous anecdotes surrounding his upbringing and his playing career, and it showcased the folksy, humorous style that became his trademark as a broadcaster.

Garagiola also wrote It's Anybody's Ballgame (1988) and Just Play Ball (2007).

=== Baseball broadcasting ===
Garagiola turned to broadcasting following his retirement as a player, first calling Cardinals radio broadcasts on KMOX from 1955 to 1962.

As an announcer, Garagiola was best known for his almost 30-year association with NBC television. He began doing national baseball broadcasts for the network in 1961 (teaming with Bob Wolff). Garagiola called several World Series on NBC Radio in the 1960s, teaming with announcers including By Saam and George Kell. After Mel Allen was fired, Garagiola was added to the New York Yankees broadcast team, where he worked with lead announcer Phil Rizzuto from 1965 to 1967; in May 1967, he called Mickey Mantle's 500th home run. Garagiola subsequently returned to broadcasting NBC baseball, and in May 1973, became the host of the pre-game show The Baseball World of Joe Garagiola; he then became a play-by-play announcer beginning in 1974.

Garagiola alternated play-by-play duties with Curt Gowdy on NBC until 1976, when he assumed the role full-time. He teamed with color commentator Tony Kubek from 1976 to 1982; in 1983, he shifted to color commentary as Vin Scully joined the network as lead play-by-play announcer. (Kubek was demoted to NBC's #2 baseball broadcast with Bob Costas.) Aside from working the Saturday Game of the Week for NBC, Scully and Garagiola called three All-Star Games (1983, 1985, and 1987), three National League Championship Series (1983, 1985, and 1987), and three World Series (1984, 1986, and 1988).

After calling the World Series with Scully in 1988, Garagiola resigned from the network in November following a contract dispute. His slot on NBC's baseball broadcasts was subsequently filled by Tom Seaver.

Post-NBC, Garagiola spent a year (1990) as a cable-television commentator for the California Angels. From 1998 to 2012, he performed part-time color commentary duties for the Arizona Diamondbacks, where his son Joe Jr. was general manager. Garagiola officially announced his retirement from broadcasting on February 22, 2013.

=== Other broadcasting ventures ===
Besides calling baseball games for NBC, Garagiola served as a co-host on Today from 1967 to 1973 and again from 1990 to 1992. He occasionally guest-hosted The Tonight Show Starring Johnny Carson, including the only live appearances by members of The Beatles on the program while still a group, when John Lennon and Paul McCartney appeared in May 1968.

In the late 1960s and 1970s, Garagiola hosted the game shows He Said, She Said; Joe Garagiola's Memory Game; Sale of the Century; and To Tell the Truth, as well as the short-lived Strike It Rich. Garagiola was a guest celebrity panelist on Match Game in the late 1970s. He hosted the St. Louis area professional wrestling show Wrestling at the Chase for three years from 1959 to 1962 (his brother, Mickey, was the ring announcer) and was a regular host of the Orange Bowl Parade in Miami on New Year's Eve. Garagiola achieved a new field of fame as co-host of the Westminster Kennel Club Dog Show for USA Network from 1994 to 2002, remarking:

I say to some people, "I played in the World Series, and I broadcast the World Series. I broadcast the All Star Game. I've done the Today show, The Tonight Show, The Tomorrow Show, the Yesterday Show, the Day After Tomorrow Show". And people come up to me and say, "I love you in Westminster".

From 1969 to 1970, Garagiola was the Saturday afternoon host of the program Monitor. During the 1960s, he contributed commentaries to Monitor for several years and had a daily five-minute morning drive-time sports commentary program on the network.

From 1977 to 1983, his name was attached to the PGA Tour's Tucson Open tournament, broadcast by NBC.

One of Garagiola's first appearances on TV was in 1960, when he appeared onstage at a campaign event for John F. Kennedy. Surrounded by politicians including former President Harry S. Truman, Garagiola put his arm around the former president and, knowing that his father who had often questioned his son's career choices would be watching the event on television, looked into the camera and said, "Hey Pop, I just want you to see who I'm hanging around with."

=== Testimony at Curt Flood trial ===
In 1970, Garagiola appeared at a preliminary trial following former Cardinals outfielder Curt Flood's lawsuit against Major League Baseball, challenging the game's reserve clause. Testifying before Judge Irving Ben Cooper in New York, Garagiola defended the clause, a stance he later deemed a "terrible mistake."

=== Politics ===
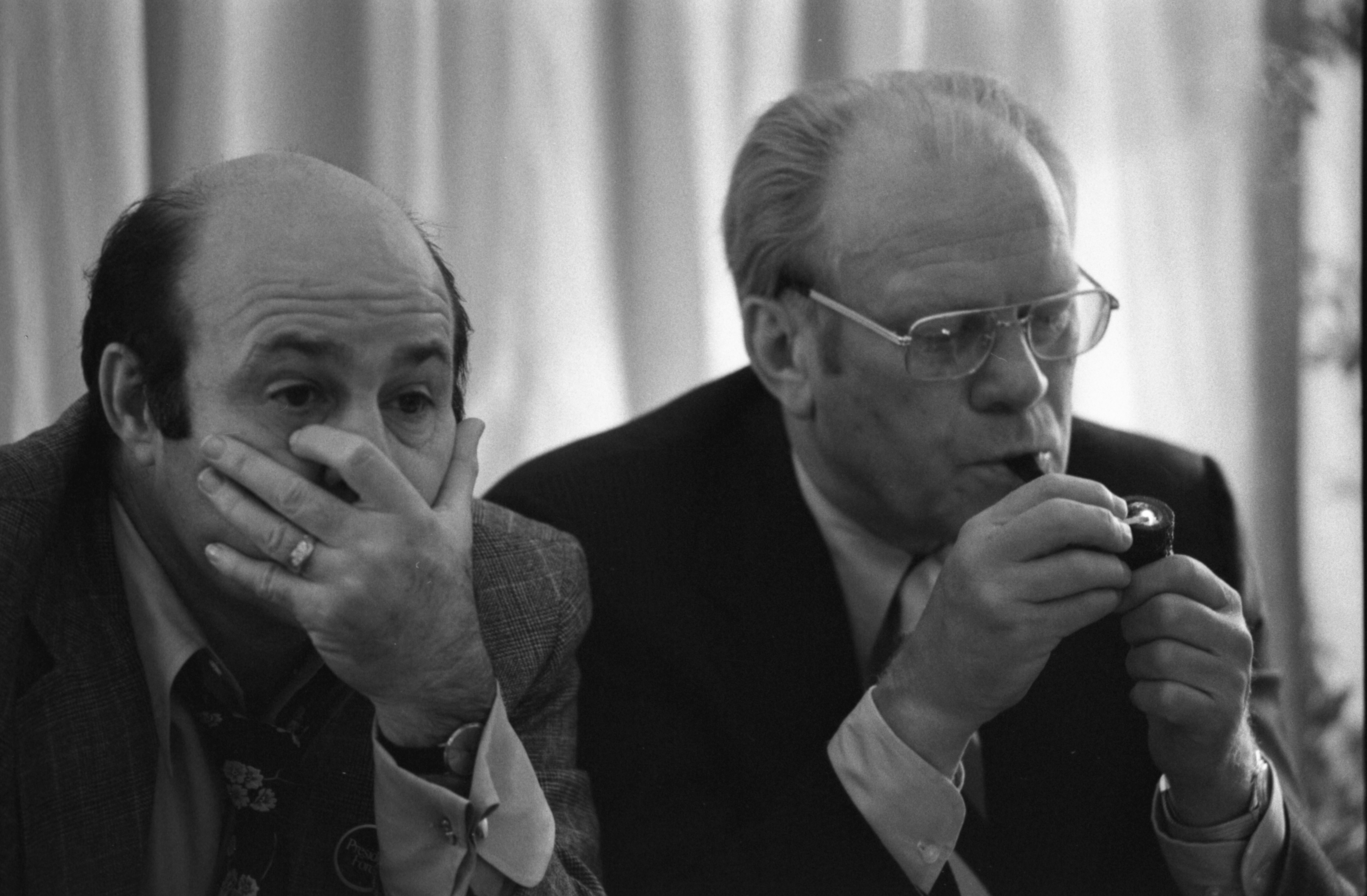
Garagiola and President Ford watching the returns for the 1976 presidential election, for which they had done a series of television ads together

In the 1976 presidential election, Garagiola enthusiastically supported the candidacy of President Gerald Ford. During the fall campaign, the Republican National Committee hired Garagiola to do a series of television ads with Ford, with Garagiola talking to Ford in a relaxed, informal setting. Derided by Ford's critics as "The Joe and Jerry Show", the ads in their opinion were considered to have negatively affected the Ford campaign.

The two men became close friends, and on election night in November 1976 Ford invited Garagiola to be one of his guests at the White House to watch the results on television. Ford lost to Democrat Jimmy Carter, the former governor of Georgia.

=== Advocacy against chewing tobacco ===
Garagiola was an advocate against the use of chewing tobacco. He had picked up the habit during his playing days with the Cardinals, but quit cold turkey in the late-1950s. He annually visited major league teams during spring training with players from his generation who have suffered from oral cancer related to the addiction, and he always made comments about it on broadcasts whenever the camera would be on a player chewing tobacco.

=== Society for American Baseball Research ===
Garagiola was the keynote luncheon speaker at the 2007 convention of the Society for American Baseball Research held in St. Louis.

== Honors ==
Garagiola was inducted into the Missouri Sports Hall of Fame in 1970. He was presented with a Peabody Award in 1973 for his NBC work. In 1991, he was honored by the Baseball Hall of Fame with the Ford C. Frick Award for outstanding broadcasting accomplishments. He was inducted into the National Sportscasters and Sportswriters Association Hall of Fame in 2004. He has also been given his own star on the St. Louis Walk of Fame. The St. Louis Wrestling Hall of Fame inducted him in 2008 for his Wrestling at the Chase broadcasts. In 2012, he was honored by the Catholic Community Foundation of the Diocese of Phoenix, receiving its inaugural Legacy Award at its 24th Annual Crosier Gala for his tireless help and generosity with the St. Peter's Mission School on the Gila River Reservation. (The American Sportscasters Association also honored him for his work with the St. Peter's Mission School with its Humanitarian Award in 1995.)

On December 4, 2013, Garagiola was named as the 2014 recipient of the Buck O'Neil Lifetime Achievement Award, presented once every three years by the Baseball Hall of Fame for positive contributions to Major League Baseball. The Hall's official announcement specifically cited his advocacy against smokeless tobacco, as well as his role as a founder of the Baseball Assistance Team, a charity that provides grants to needy members of the professional baseball community.

In the 2013 film 42, Garagiola was portrayed by actor Gino Anthony Pesi.

In the 1990s, Garagiola began working with the St. Peter's Indian Mission Catholic School, a poorly-funded educational facility on the Gila River Indian Reservation, south of Phoenix. During his many years of charity work with the school he helped facilitate the repair or construction of an all-purpose facility, a basketball court, a soccer and track field, a library and computer learning center and extensive repairs on the old mission church.

For his work, he was honored by tribal leaders with the nickname "Awesome Fox" and today his name can be seen on The Joe Garagiola Learning Center and Awesome Fox Field at the mission school.

== Personal life ==
Garagiola married Audrie Ross, the organist at the Cardinals' ballpark in St. Louis, in 1949; their two sons later had an association with baseball. Joe Jr., was the general manager for the Arizona Diamondbacks, and later senior vice president of baseball operations for Major League Baseball. His other son Steve is a retired broadcast journalist as well; he served as a reporter and anchor for WDIV-TV, the NBC affiliate in Detroit. His daughter, Gina, has also worked in TV news, as a field reporter for Phoenix television station KTVK, and is now a freelance writer. Garagiola Sr. had eight grandchildren. One of those grandchildren, Chris, was named the radio play-by-play announcer for the Diamondbacks in December 2023.

== Death ==
Garagiola died on March 23, 2016, at age 90, in Scottsdale, Arizona. The Diamondbacks wore a patch in his memory on their right sleeve for the 2016 season, a black circle with "JOE" written in white in the center, with a catchers' mask replacing the O.

Garagiola's funeral mass was held on April 13 in St. Louis at St. Ambrose Catholic Church, the same church where he was baptized. He was interred at Resurrection Cemetery in St. Louis.

Media offices
Preceded by New show	Host of He Said, She Said; 1969–1970	Succeeded by Bert Convy on Tattletales (1974–1978, 1982–1984)
Preceded by Garry Moore	Host of To Tell the Truth; 1977–1978	Succeeded by Robin Ward in 1980
Preceded by Curt Gowdy	World Series network television play-by-play announcer (with Curt Gowdy in 1975 and Dick Enberg in 1982; concurrent with Keith Jackson and Al Michaels in even numbered years); 1975–1982	Succeeded by Al Michaels (in odd numbered years only) and Vin Scully (in even numbered years only)
Preceded by Curt Gowdy	Lead play-by-play announcer, Major League Baseball on NBC; 1974–1982 (alternated with Curt Gowdy from 1974 to 1975 and Dick Enberg in 1982)	Succeeded by Vin Scully
Preceded by Fred Haney; Tony Kubek	Lead color commentator, Major League Baseball on NBC; 1961–1965; 1983–1988	Succeeded by Pee Wee Reese; Tom Seaver
