= David Montgomery (baseball) =

American baseball executive (1946–2019)

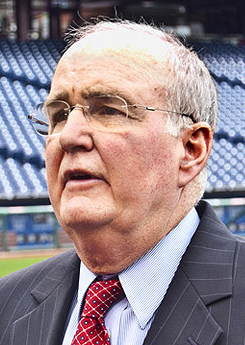
- Montgomery in 2011
- Born: June 26, 1946; Philadelphia, Pennsylvania, U.S.
- Died: May 8, 2019 (aged 72)
- Occupation: Baseball executive
- Known for: President and CEO of the Philadelphia Phillies
- Awards: Buck O'Neil Lifetime Achievement Award; Philadelphia Phillies Wall of Fame

David Paul Montgomery (June 26, 1946 – May 8, 2019) was an American businessman and baseball executive. He served as chairman, minority-owner, and president of the Philadelphia Phillies of Major League Baseball.

== Early life and education ==
As a child growing up in Philadelphia, Montgomery attended Philadelphia Phillies games at Connie Mack Stadium. Before attending college, Montgomery worked as a paper delivery boy and a high school baseball coach. Montgomery was a 1964 alumnus of the William Penn Charter School in Philadelphia and as an undergraduate attended the University of Pennsylvania where he was first a liberal arts major, and then a history major. Montgomery was a member of Phi Sigma Kappa fraternity while an undergraduate. Montgomery continued to attend Phillies games as a college student with future governor Ed Rendell, where he recalled "[trying] to eat all the food that $5 could buy... as they shared their thoughts with the players". He also attended the Wharton Business School as a graduate student, graduating in 1970. During his tenure at Wharton, he also coached the linemen for the varsity football team at Germantown Academy.

== Baseball career ==
After interviewing for positions with the Scott Paper Company and Quaker Oats and being encouraged by Rendell to apply for a job with the Philadelphia 76ers, Montgomery reached out to former Phillies ace Robin Roberts, whose son he coached at Germantown, about a job with the baseball club. Montgomery was hired as a member of the Phillies' sales department in 1971, becoming director of sales and marketing in the mid-1970s and the head of the business department by 1980. During the early 1970s, he was also the team's scoreboard operator.

Montgomery, along with co-owner Bill Giles, purchased the team in 1981 for $30 million ($106,000,000 today); Giles, the primary owner, named Montgomery the executive vice president of the team. In 1997, when Giles left the team presidency to become the chairman and focus on negotiating for a new stadium for the team, he recommended Montgomery to replace him as team president. In so doing, Montgomery became the first native of Philadelphia to run the club in over 60 years. One of his focuses with the team was brand development, evidenced by the team's commitment to signing successful players to long-term contracts prior to the opening of Citizens Bank Park in 2004.

In August 2014, Montgomery took a leave of absence from the Phillies, while undergoing treatment for jaw bone cancer. When he returned to the team in January 2015, he assumed the title of chairman, while Giles became chairman emeritus. Pat Gillick, who served as interim president during Montgomery's leave, assumed the role permanently.

In 2013, the Phillies opened a $4 million facility at their Carpenter Complex as the first indoor climate-controlled training center at a major-league spring-training site. It is used by the team year-round in Clearwater for training, rehabilitation, and daily workouts. On March 22, 2018, the Phillies renamed the indoor facility at the complex the "David P. Montgomery Baseball Performance Center."

== Awards and honors ==
Montgomery received the Allan H. (Bud) Selig Executive Leadership Award from the Professional Baseball Scouts Foundation, the Ed Snider Lifetime Distinguished Humanitarian Award from the Philadelphia Sports Writers Association, and has been recognized by the Mural Arts Program, the Boys & Girls Clubs of Philadelphia and the Schuylkill Center for Environmental Education. Daisy Field, where he grew up playing baseball, was re-named for him in 2018, and in May 2019, he was honored by the Fairmount Park Conservancy as the recipient of the Centennial Award for Civic Leadership.

On March 5, 2020, Montgomery was named the fifth winner of the Buck O'Neil Lifetime Achievement Award by the National Baseball Hall of Fame. Commissioner Rob Manfred and Montgomery's wife Lyn spoke on his behalf.

On August 17, 2024, the Montgomery was posthumously inducted into the Phillies Wall of Fame. During his induction ceremony, the Phillies announced the high angled wall in left-center field at Citizens Bank Park would be named "Monty's Angle" in honor of him. During the design of Citizens Bank Park, Montgomery had specifically requested for the section of the wall to add a sense of uniqueness to the park and increase the likelihood for plays such as an inside-the-park home run.

== Outside baseball ==
Montgomery was a trustee of the University of Pennsylvania, served community action organizations, and was a member of Major League Baseball Enterprise's board of directors.

== Personal life ==
Montgomery and his wife Lyn had three children and three grandchildren. Montgomery was diagnosed with cancer of the jawbone in May 2014, and underwent surgery that same year. He died from the disease on the morning of May 8, 2019, at the age of 72.
