= Pat Gillick =

American professional baseball executive (born 1937)

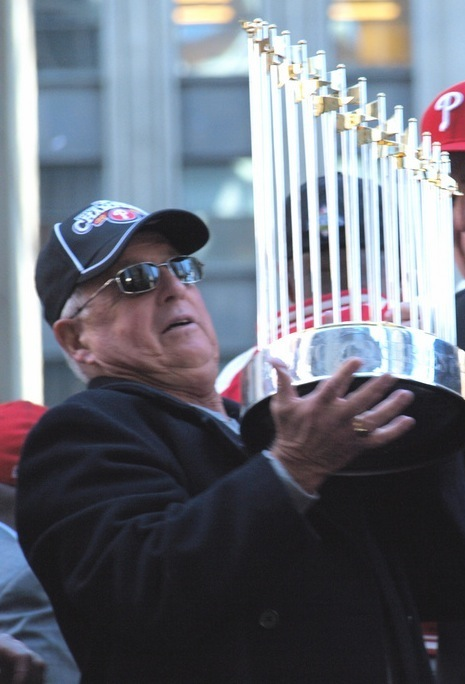
- Gillick at the 2008 Phillies World Series parade
- General manager
- Born: August 22, 1937 (age 89); Chico, California, U.S.
- Stats at Baseball Reference

Teams
- As general manager: Toronto Blue Jays (1978–1994); Baltimore Orioles (1996–1998); Seattle Mariners (2000–2003); Philadelphia Phillies (2006–2008); As president: Philadelphia Phillies (2014–2015)

Career highlights and awards
- 3× World Series champion (1992, 1993, 2008); Toronto Blue Jays Hall of Excellence; Philadelphia Phillies Wall of Fame

Member of the National

Baseball Hall of Fame
- Induction: 2011
- Vote: 81.3%
- Election method: Expansion Era Committee

Lawrence Patrick David Gillick (born August 22, 1937) is an American-Canadian professional baseball executive. He served as the general manager of four MLB teams: the Toronto Blue Jays (1978–1994), Baltimore Orioles (1996–1998), Seattle Mariners (2000–2003), and Philadelphia Phillies (2006–2008). He guided the Blue Jays to World Series championships in 1992 and 1993 and the Phillies in 2008. He is a minority owner of the Phillies.

Gillick was inducted into the National Baseball Hall of Fame in 2011, the Canadian Baseball Hall of Fame in 1997, the Ontario Sports Hall of Fame in 2013, the Toronto Blue Jays Level of Excellence in 1997, and the Phillies Wall of Fame in 2018.

Before working as an executive, he won a college national championship as a pitcher for the University of Southern California (USC) Trojans in 1958.

== Early life ==
Gillick was born to former minor league baseball player Larry Gillick in Chico, California. In 1951, he earned his Eagle Scout from the Boy Scouts of America. He continued to stay involved in Scouting and received the Order of the Arrow's Vigil Honor mere months after winning the College World Series at USC. After graduating from Notre Dame High School in Sherman Oaks, California, he hitchhiked to Vulcan, Alberta, to toil as a kid pitcher with the semi-pro Vulcan Elks of the Foothills-Wheatbelt League. Gillick had to wire his grandmother for $25 to finance his last leg from Montana to Vulcan. In 1956 while playing for Vulcan Elks, Gillick was picked up by George Wesley of the Granum White Sox to pitch in tournaments. He threw a no hitter in Medicine Hat, fanned 17 batters in Calgary and pitched Granum to an 18–1 victory in Fernie.

He attended USC and joined the Delta Chi Fraternity. He graduated in 1958 with a degree in business. He was also a gifted pitcher, playing on the 1958 national title baseball team at USC. He spent five years in the minor league systems of the Baltimore Orioles and Pittsburgh Pirates, venturing as high as Triple-A. A left-hander, Gillick posted a win–loss record of 45–32 with an earned run average of 3.42 in 164 minor league games.

== Front office career ==
Pat Gillick is a member of the Toronto Blue Jays' Level of Excellence.

Gillick retired from playing and began a front-office career in 1963, when he became the assistant farm director with the Houston Colt .45s. He would eventually work his way up to the position of director of scouting before moving to the New York Yankees system in 1974, as a coordinator of player development. In 1976, he moved, this time to the expansion Toronto Blue Jays, becoming their vice-president of player personnel, and in 1977, their vice-president of baseball operations and general manager. In 1984, he was named executive vice-president of baseball operations.

As Toronto's general manager, Gillick won five division titles (1985, 1989, 1991, 1992 and 1993) and led the club to their first World Series championships in 1992 and 1993. Shortly after Gillick resigned in 1994, the Blue Jays went into decline, not finishing higher than third place until 2006, and failing to make the playoffs until 2015.

In 1995, Gillick was named the general manager of the Baltimore Orioles to replace Roland Hemond, who had resigned. He cited the fact that they were close to winning a championship as a factor to his decision to come out of retirement. He guided the Orioles to the playoffs in 1996 and 1997. He announced on September 20, 1998 his departure from the Orioles when his three-year contract expired after the conclusion of the 1998 season. The Orioles struggled shortly after his departure, failing to achieve a winning season until 2012.

Gillick then became the general manager of the Seattle Mariners, who had parlayed their incredible 1995 playoff run into a new ballpark and the financial resources to become a perennial contender. Upon his hiring, the responsibility fell on Gillick to trade Ken Griffey Jr. to Cincinnati after Griffey played out his final season in Seattle. The Mariners made back-to-back playoff appearances for the first (and only) time in franchise history in 2000 and 2001, and the 2001 team, with a 116–46 record, tied the 1906 Chicago Cubs for the all-time Major League Baseball record for most wins in a single season. However, the Mariners failed to make it past the American League Championship Series in either year and did not make the playoffs for the rest of Gillick's tenure as general manager and advisor. Gillick resigned after the 2003 season. Following his departure, the Mariners would not reach the playoffs again until 2022.

On November 2, 2005, Gillick was named the Philadelphia Phillies' general manager. His first big move was to trade Jim Thome and cash to the Chicago White Sox for Aaron Rowand and Gio González and Daniel Haigwood, being a move which cleared the way for Phillies' Rookie of the Year Ryan Howard to become the permanent starter. Howard would be named NL MVP that year.

Gillick had permanent residence in Toronto with his wife Doris, however they have since relocated to Seattle after he became the Phillies general manager. He had become a Canadian citizen in 2004.

Gillick retired from his position as general manager after leading the Phillies to a World Series championship in 2008. Assistant general manager Rubén Amaro Jr. was named his successor. Gillick remained with the Phillies as a senior advisor to Amaro and president David Montgomery. In August 2014, Gillick became interim president of the Phillies while Montgomery was on medical leave. In January 2015, Montgomery returned but became Phillies chairman, while Gillick assumed the club presidency on a permanent basis. Gillick returned to his senior advisor role after the Phillies promoted Andy MacPhail to president after the 2015 season. Gillick is a minority owner of the Phillies.

Beginning in 2016, Gillick served as part-owner of teams in the collegiate woodbat Great West League such as the Chico Heat and Yuba-Sutter Gold Sox. He won championships with the Heat in the league's inaugural season in 2016 and their final season in 2018.

=== Record as general manager ===
Team	Year	Regular season					Postseason			
Team	Year	Games	Won	Lost	Win %	Finish	Won	Lost	Win %	Result
TOR	1978	161	59	102	.366	7th in AL East	—	—	—	—
TOR	1979	162	53	109	.327	7th in AL East	—	—	—	—
TOR	1980	162	67	95	.414	7th in AL East	–	–	–	–
TOR	1981	58	16	42	.276	7th in AL East	–	–	–	–
TOR	1981	48	21	27	.438	7th in AL East	–	–	–	–
TOR	1982	162	78	84	.481	6th in AL East	–	–	–	–
TOR	1983	162	89	73	.549	4th in AL East	–	–	–	–
TOR	1984	162	89	73	.549	2nd in AL East	–	–	–	–
TOR	1985	161	99	62	.615	1st in AL East	3	4	.429	Lost ALCS (KC)
TOR	1986	162	86	76	.531	4th in AL East	–	–	–	–
TOR	1987	162	96	66	.593	2nd in AL East	–	–	–	–
TOR	1988	162	87	75	.537	3rd in AL East	–	–	–	–
TOR	1989	162	89	73	.549	1st in AL East	1	4	.200	Lost ALCS (OAK)
TOR	1990	162	86	76	.531	2nd in AL East	–	–	–	–
TOR	1991	162	91	71	.562	1st in AL East	1	4	.200	Lost ALCS (MIN)
TOR	1992	162	96	66	.593	1st in AL East	8	4	.667	Won World Series (ATL)
TOR	1993	162	95	67	.586	1st in AL East	8	4	.667	Won World Series (PHI)
TOR	1994	115	55	60	.478	3rd in AL East	–	–	–	–
TOR total		2,651	1,352	1,297	.510		21	20	.512	
BAL	1996	162	88	74	.543	2nd in AL East	4	5	.444	Lost ALCS (NYY)
BAL	1997	162	98	64	.605	1st in AL East	5	5	.500	Lost ALCS (CLE)
BAL	1998	162	79	83	.488	4th in AL East	–	–	–	–
BAL total		486	265	221	.545		9	10	.474	
SEA	2000	162	91	71	.562	2nd in AL West	5	4	.556	Lost ALCS (NYY)
SEA	2001	162	116	46	.716	1st in AL West	4	6	.400	Lost ALCS (NYY)
SEA	2002	162	93	69	.574	3rd in AL West	–	–	–	–
SEA	2003	162	93	69	.574	2nd in AL West	–	–	–	–
SEA total		648	393	255	.606		9	10	.474	
PHI	2006	162	85	77	.525	2nd in NL East	–	–	–	
PHI	2007	162	89	73	.549	1st in NL East	0	3	.000	Lost NLDS (COL)
PHI	2008	162	92	70	.568	1st in NL East	11	3	.786	Won World Series (TB)
PHI total		486	266	220	.547		11	6	.647	
Total		4,271	2,276	1,993	.533		50	46	.521	

== Honors and awards ==
- In 1993, Sporting News awarded its Sportsman of the Year honor to Gillick and Blue Jays manager Cito Gaston.
- In 1997, Gillick was inducted into the Canadian Baseball Hall of Fame.
- In 2002, Gillick was inducted into the Toronto Blue Jays' Level of Excellence
- In 2008, baseball fans voted him the "This Year in Baseball Awards" Executive of the Year.
- Also in 2008, he was named "King of Baseball", a ceremonial title awarded annually by Minor League Baseball in recognition of one person's longtime dedication and service to professional baseball.
- In December 2009, Sports Illustrated named him as number 7 on its list of the Top 10 GMs/Executives of the Decade across all sports.
- On December 6, 2010, Gillick was elected to the National Baseball Hall of Fame by the new Expansion Era Committee which considers Expansion Era candidates identified from the Expansion Era, 1973–present. He was the fourth general manager ever enshrined. He was formally inducted on July 24, 2011, along with Roberto Alomar and Bert Blyleven.
- In 2013, Gillick was inducted into the Ontario Sports Hall of Fame
- In 2015, Gillick received the Distinguished Eagle Scout Award from the Boy Scouts of America
- In 2018, Gillick became the first executive inducted into the Philadelphia Baseball Wall of Fame

Sporting positions
Preceded by Peter Bavasi	Toronto Blue Jays General manager 1978–1994	Succeeded by Gord Ash
Preceded by Roland Hemond	Baltimore Orioles General manager 1995–1998	Succeeded by Frank Wren
Preceded by Woody Woodward	Seattle Mariners General manager 1999–2003	Succeeded by Bill Bavasi
Preceded by Ed Wade	Philadelphia Phillies General manager 2005–2008	Succeeded by Rubén Amaro Jr.
