= Buck O'Neil Lifetime Achievement Award =

Award presented by the National Baseball Hall of Fame

The Buck O'Neil Lifetime Achievement Award is an award presented by the National Baseball Hall of Fame not more than once every three years to honor an individual who enhances baseball's positive image on society, who broadens the game's appeal, and whose integrity and dignity are comparable to the namesake of the award, John Jordan "Buck" O'Neil. There have been five recipients of the award since its inception in 2008.

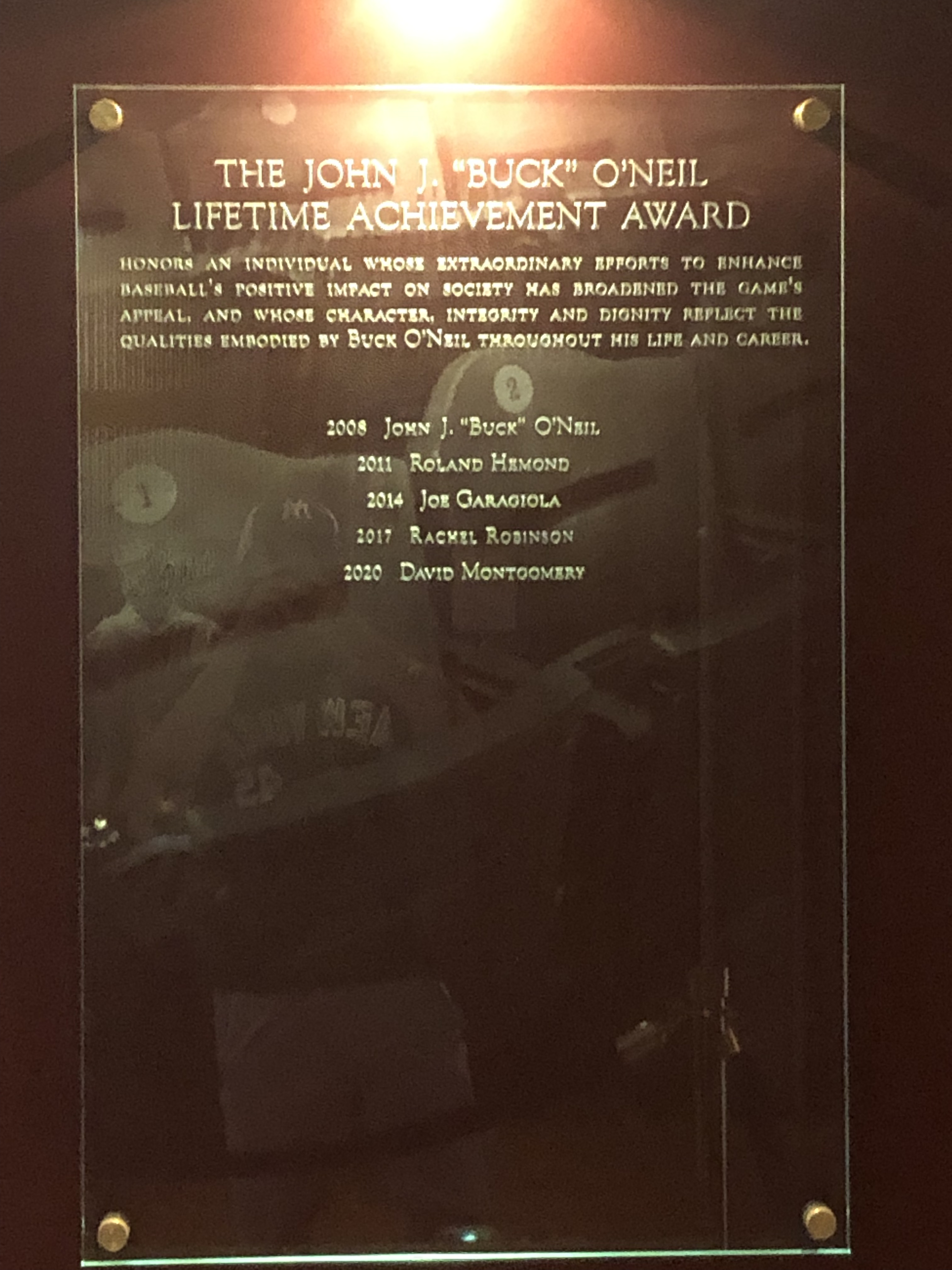
The list of award winners (2021)

== History ==
In 2008, the Hall of Fame dedicated a life-size bronze statue of O'Neil near the museum's entrance in Cooperstown, New York. With the statue are a list of recipients of the award and a plaque that summarizes O'Neil's contributions to the game of baseball. A smaller statue is given to each honoree at the induction ceremony during Hall of Fame Weekend.

== Awardees ==
| Year | Honoree | Refs |
|---|---|---|
| 2008 | Buck O'Neil | |
| 2011 | Roland Hemond | |
| 2014 | Joe Garagiola | |
| 2017 | Rachel Robinson | |
| 2020 | David Montgomery | |
| 2023 | Carl Erskine | |
| 2026 | Bill White | |

== See also ==
- John "Buck" O'Neil Legacy Award
- Baseball awards § Other individual awards
