= Tim Sullivan (sports columnist) =

American sports writer

Tim Sullivan is an American sports writer. He has been a journalist for over 35 years and has formerly worked for U-T San Diego and The Cincinnati Enquirer, and currently writes for the Louisville Courier-Journal as a member of their sports staff. Sullivan's 2012 dismissal from U-T San Diego drew criticism after Sullivan announced via Twitter that he was no longer working for the paper. Sullivan joined The Courier-Journal later that same year.

== Awards ==
- Cincinnati Magazine, Worst Sports Writer, 1986
- Cincinnati Magazine, Best Sports Writer, 1988
- Best of Gannett, 1988
- NSSA Hall of Fame nominee for California Sportswriter, 2011
