= Roland Hemond =

American baseball executive (1929–2021)

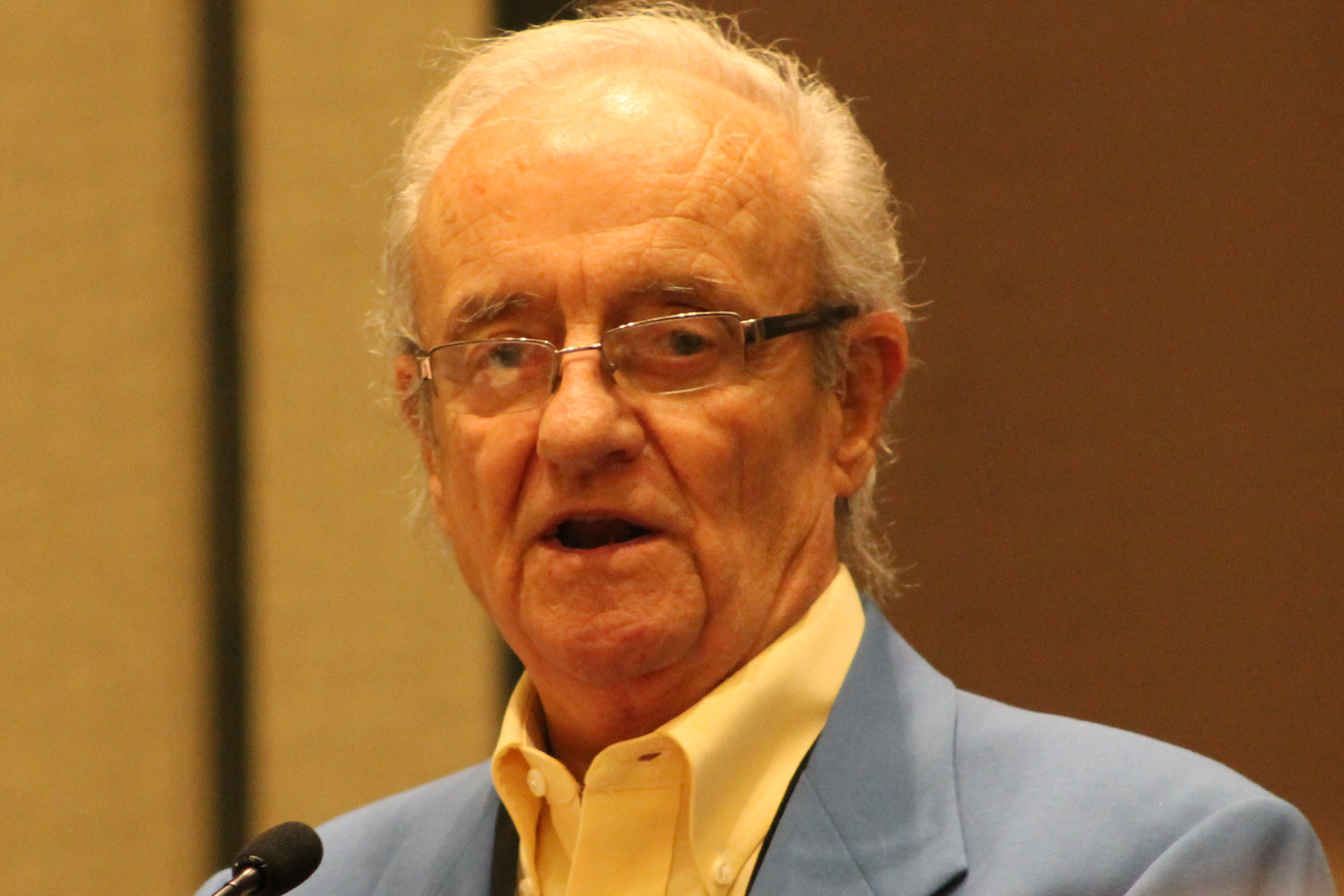
- Hemond in 2014
- General manager / Executive
- Born: October 26, 1929; Central Falls, Rhode Island, U.S.
- Died: December 12, 2021 (aged 92)

Teams
- As general manager: Chicago White Sox (1973–1985); Baltimore Orioles (1988–1995); As executive: Milwaukee Braves (1952–1960); California Angels (1961–1970); Chicago White Sox (2001–2007); Arizona Diamondbacks (1996–2000, 2007–2017)

Career highlights and awards
- World Series champion (1957); 2× Sporting News Executive of the Year (1972, 1989); United Press International Executive of the Year (1983); Buck O'Neil Lifetime Achievement Award; Branch Rickey Award

Roland A. Hemond (October 26, 1929 – December 12, 2021) was an American professional baseball executive who worked in Major League Baseball. He served as the scouting director of the California Angels, general manager of the Chicago White Sox and Baltimore Orioles, senior executive vice president of the Arizona Diamondbacks, executive advisor to the general manager of the White Sox, and special assistant to the president for the Arizona Diamondbacks.

== Career ==
After graduating from high school, Hemond served in the United States Coast Guard for four years from 1947 to 1951 and was stationed at Brooklyn Navy Yard for three of those years. In 1951, he took a job with the Hartford Chiefs, a Minor League Baseball team. After two months, he was hired by the Boston Braves, and stayed with the team when it relocated to Milwaukee. In 1961, the Los Angeles Angels hired him as their scouting director.

Both Hemond and Chuck Tanner joined the Chicago White Sox from the Angels on September 4, 1970, when general manager Stu Holcomb hired them as director of player personnel and manager respectively. Hemond became general manager in 1973. Hemond was promoted to special assistant to the chairman of the board and president when Ken Harrelson replaced him as executive vice president of baseball operations on October 2, 1985. He resigned from the White Sox on April 29, 1986, and became Commissioner of Baseball Peter Ueberroth's consultant for special projects seventeen days later on May 16.

The Baltimore Orioles hired Hemond as their general manager in 1988, and he served in the role until 1995. From 1996 to 2000, he was the senior executive vice president of the Arizona Diamondbacks. He returned to the White Sox between 2001 and 2007 as an executive advisor. In 2007, Hemond returned to the Arizona Diamondbacks as special assistant to the president.

Hemond was also credited with the original idea for the Arizona Fall League, an off-season developmental league owned and operated by Major League Baseball. The league features the top prospects from each of the MLB teams, with all games played in the spring training stadiums in and around Phoenix, Arizona. He was the former president of the Association of Professional Ball Players of America (APBPA), a non-profit that provides anonymous financial assistance and college scholarships to current and former players, scouts, and others connected with any level of professional organized baseball. Hemond was a long-time member of the Society for American Baseball Research (SABR) and a regular presenter and panelist at the Society's conferences; the Arizona chapter of SABR was renamed in his honor on January 28, 2017.

Hemond was credited with mentoring Dave Dombrowski, Walt Jocketty, Doug Melvin, and Dan Evans.

== Awards ==
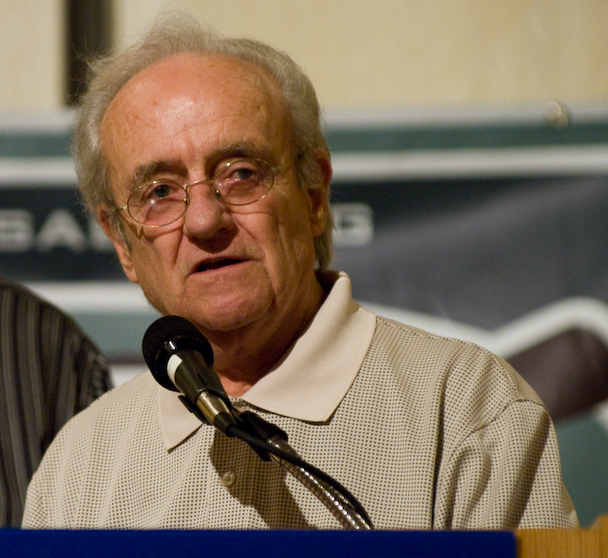
Hemond in 2009

Hemond was a two-time winner of Major League Baseball's Executive of the Year award (1972, 1989), as well as winner of the United Press International Executive of the Year Award in 1983. In 2001, he was named the King of Baseball. Hemond won the Branch Rickey Award in 2003.

In February 2011, the Baseball Hall of Fame announced that Hemond would become the second person to receive the Buck O'Neil Lifetime Achievement Award recognizing "the profound impact he has had on the game, for his baseball intelligence as a keen talent evaluator and in building winning teams, to the universal respect he has earned for mentoring generations of baseball executives, past and present." The award was presented to him on July 23.

Three annual awards are named in Hemond's honor: the Roland Hemond Award, presented by the White Sox in honor of those who are dedicated to bettering the lives of others through extraordinary personal sacrifice; the Baseball America Award, presented to a person who has made major contributions to scouting and player development; and the Society for American Baseball Research (SABR) Award, given to the executive who has displayed great respect for scouts. Hemond was the inaugural recipient of both the Baseball America and SABR awards. He received an honorary degree in Humane Letters from the University of Phoenix in July 2006.

== Personal life ==
Hemond and his wife, Margo, had five children. Hemond died on December 12, 2021, at the age of 92.

Sporting positions
Preceded by Stuart Holcomb	Chicago White Sox General Manager; 1970–1985	Succeeded by Ken Harrelson
Preceded by Hank Peters	Baltimore Orioles General Manager; 1988–1995	Succeeded by Pat Gillick
