= Tracy Ringolsby =

American sportswriter

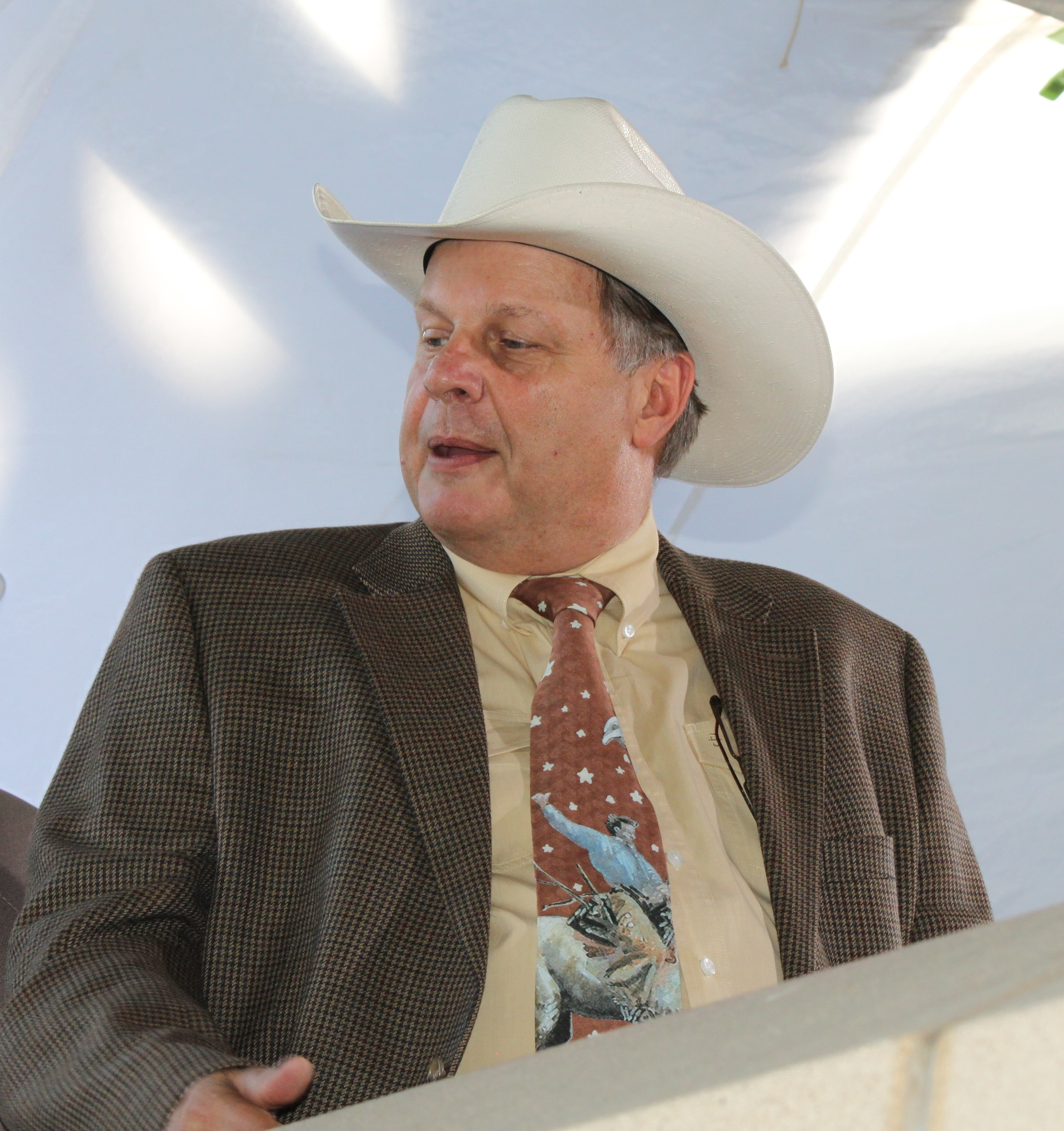
- Ringolsby in 2010
- Born: April 30, 1951 (age 73); Cheyenne, Wyoming, U.S.
- Occupation: Sportswriter
- Employer: Baseball America
- Awards: J. G. Taylor Spink Award

Tracy Ringolsby (born April 30, 1951) is an American sportswriter. He was a founder and original columnist for Baseball America from its beginning until a new ownership group took over changed the publication from its focus on minor leagues to a more generic approach. In retirement, he created a Rockies focused website, InsideTheSeams.com, and a University of Wyoming focused website, WelcomeTo7220.com, in reference to the school being located at the highest elevation (7,220 feet) of any Division 1 school. He worked for the Rocky Mountain News in Denver, Colorado, until its closure during spring training 2009, and spent 2009–2013 as the pre-game/post-game analyst with Fox Sports Rocky Mountain/ROOTSPORTS for Rockies telecasts. He is the former president of the Baseball Writers' Association of America (BBWAA) and was a member from 1976 to 2013. He rejoined the BBWAA in 2016 when employees of MLB.com, where he worked for more than four years, were admitted to the BBWAA.

== Awards ==
Ringolsby won an Emmy in 2010, 2011 and 2012 for his Beyond the Boxscore segment on the Rockies pre-game show. He was the 2000 recipient of the Shining Star Award for journalistic excellence, presented by the Colorado Press Association, becoming the first sports writer nominated for the award. Ringolsby was the 2005 recipient of the J. G. Taylor Spink Award which was presented at the Baseball Hall of Fame in Cooperstown, New York, on July 30, 2006. He was selected Colorado Sports Writer of the Year in 2005 and 2008, and was honored by the Wyoming Sports Hall of Fame for career achievement in 2009. He also received an honorary doctorate in letters from the University of Wyoming in the spring of 2009.

== Background ==
A native of Wyoming, Ringolsby is a graduate of Cheyenne East High School, and a member of the school's Hall of Fame. Tracy then attended Colorado State University in Fort Collins, Colorado for a year and a half before finishing up what time he spent in college at the University of Wyoming, from which both of his parents earned their degrees.

He began his writing career as one-man sports staff for the Wyoming State Tribune, the afternoon newspaper in Cheyenne, the day after he turned 17. He later worked for United Press International before beginning a career of covering Major League Baseball.

== Writing career ==
After two years in college, Ringolsby chose to follow up on the sports writing career he began in Cheyenne during his high school days, and went to work for United Press International. He worked for UPI from June 1971 until February 1977, spending time at the UPI bureaus in Cheyenne, Denver and Kansas City. Ringolsby was a beat writer covering he Colorado Rockies for the Rocky Mountain News from 1992, the year before the Rockies played their first game, until Feb. 27, 2009, the day the paper folded. Ringolsby previously worked for the Long Beach Independent Press-Telegram (California Angels, March 1977 – July 1980), the Seattle Post-Intelligencer (Seattle Mariners, July 1980 – July 1983), the Kansas City Star-Times (Kansas City Royals, August 1983 – February 1986), and the Dallas Morning News (Texas Rangers, March 1986 – 1991).

== Other activities ==
Ringolsby is a co-founder of Baseball America and a former member of the board of directors for the Professional Baseball Scouts Foundation during its existence. He was a member of the Society for American Baseball Research from 1979 through 2009, and rejoined for 2014–15. He wrote a syndicated baseball column from 1986–2006, and was a columnist for FoxSports.com from April 2006 until July 2012.

Ringolsby was a member of the board of directors of the Cowboy Joe Club at the University of Wyoming for 12 years, and a former member of the Board of Directors of the National Western Stock Show.

== Personal life ==
Ringolsby and his wife, Jane, live outside of Cheyenne, Wyoming, with their four horses, Donotto, Sunny, Valkyra and Simon. His daughter, Laramie, and grandson, Scout, reside in Cheyenne. Ringolsby is a member of a pioneer family in Wyoming with roots to three of the four families that originally settled southeast Wyoming and southwest Nebraska—the Wilkinson, Golden and Tracy families.
