= Veterans Committee =

Various committees of the National Baseball Hall of Fame and Museum

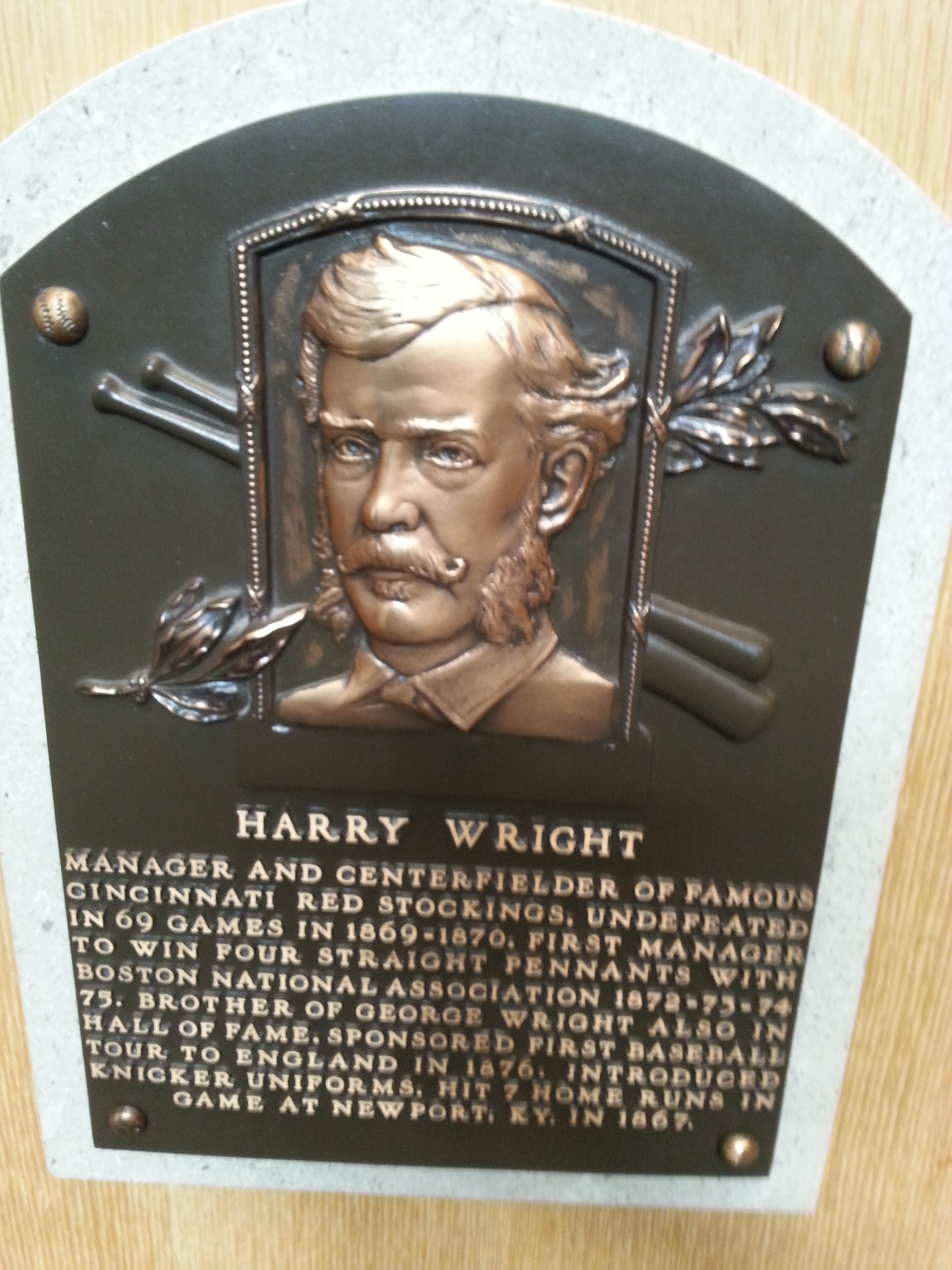
Plaque for Harry Wright, one of the first selections by the Veterans Committee, at the Hall of Fame

The Veterans Committee is the popular name of various committees of the National Baseball Hall of Fame and Museum that elect participants other than recently retired players.

Originally, it referenced the National Baseball Hall of Fame Committee to Consider Managers, Umpires, Executives and Long-Retired Players; a former voting committee of the Baseball Hall of Fame that provided an opportunity for Hall of Fame enshrinement to all individuals who are eligible for induction but ineligible for consideration by the Baseball Writers' Association of America (BBWAA). The term "Veterans Committee" is taken from the body's former official name: National Baseball Hall of Fame Committee on Baseball Veterans, which first met in 1953.

The committee structure and voting process has undergone multiple changes, most recently in April 2022. Currently, baseball players and non-players (managers, executives, and umpires) considered by the committee are classed into two timeframes, the Contemporary Baseball Era (1980–present) and the Classic Baseball Era (before 1980). Voting is conducted annually in December, with any elected persons inducted into the Hall of Fame the following calendar year. Balloting currently rotates on an annual basis for nominees selected from one of three groups: players of the Contemporary Baseball Era, non-players of the Contemporary Baseball Era, and all persons of the Classic Baseball Era.

== History ==
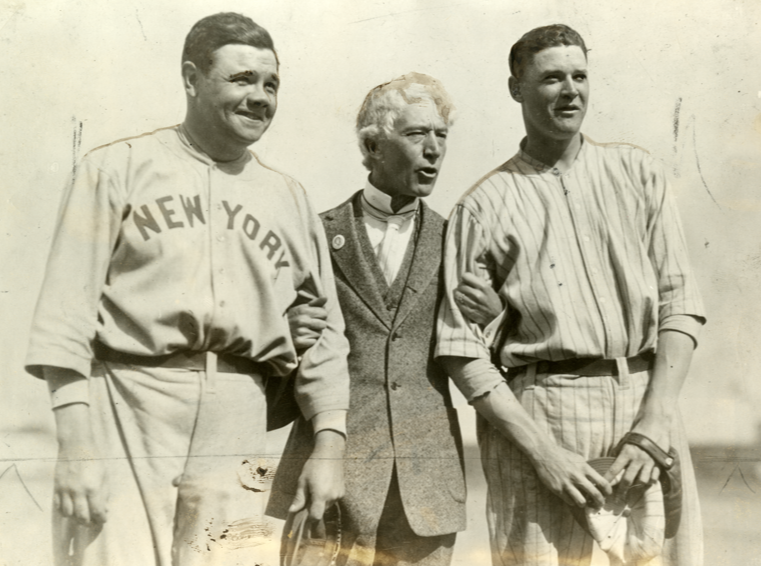
Kenesaw Mountain Landis (center), with Babe Ruth (left) and Bob Meusel

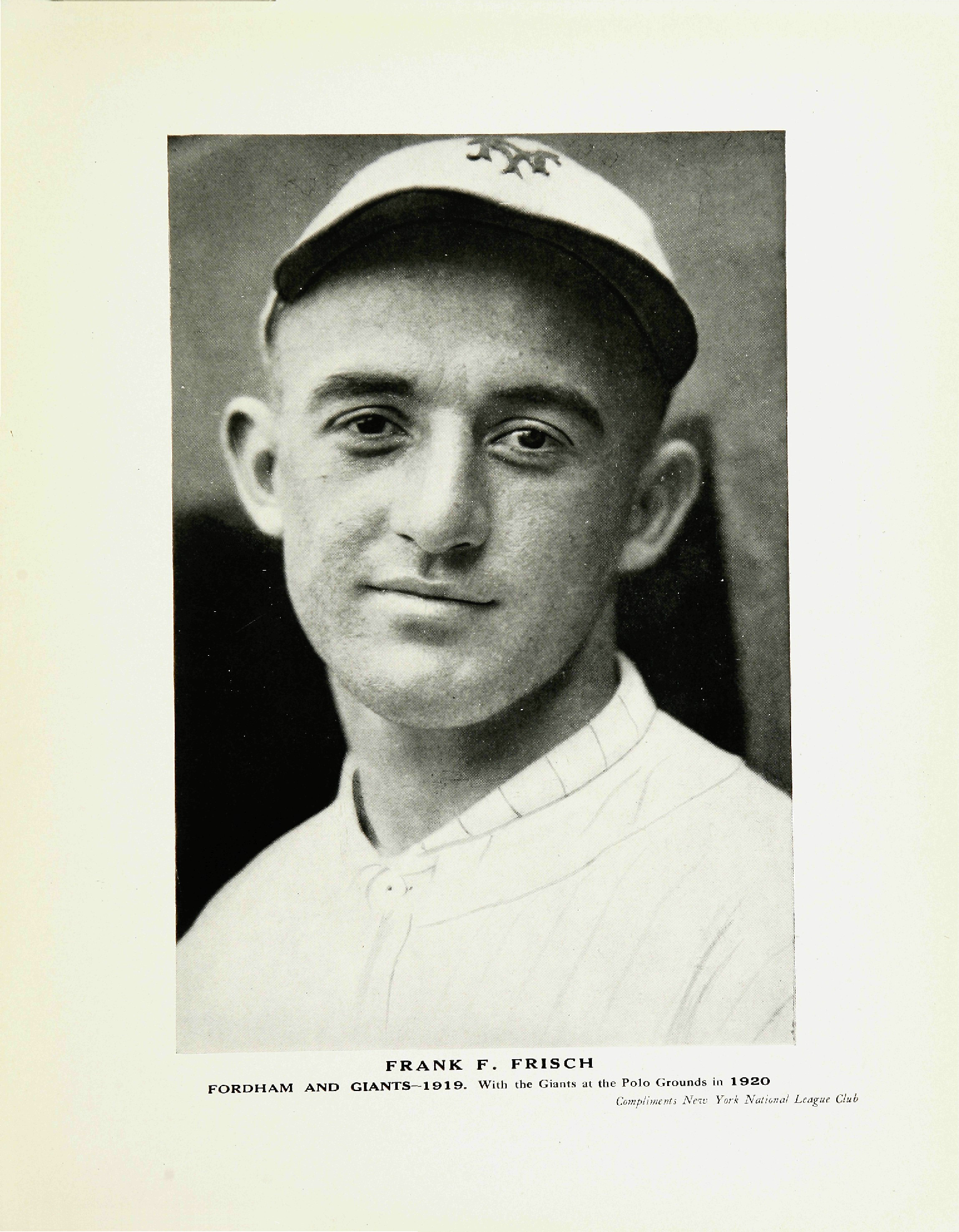
Frankie Frisch as a player, c.1919

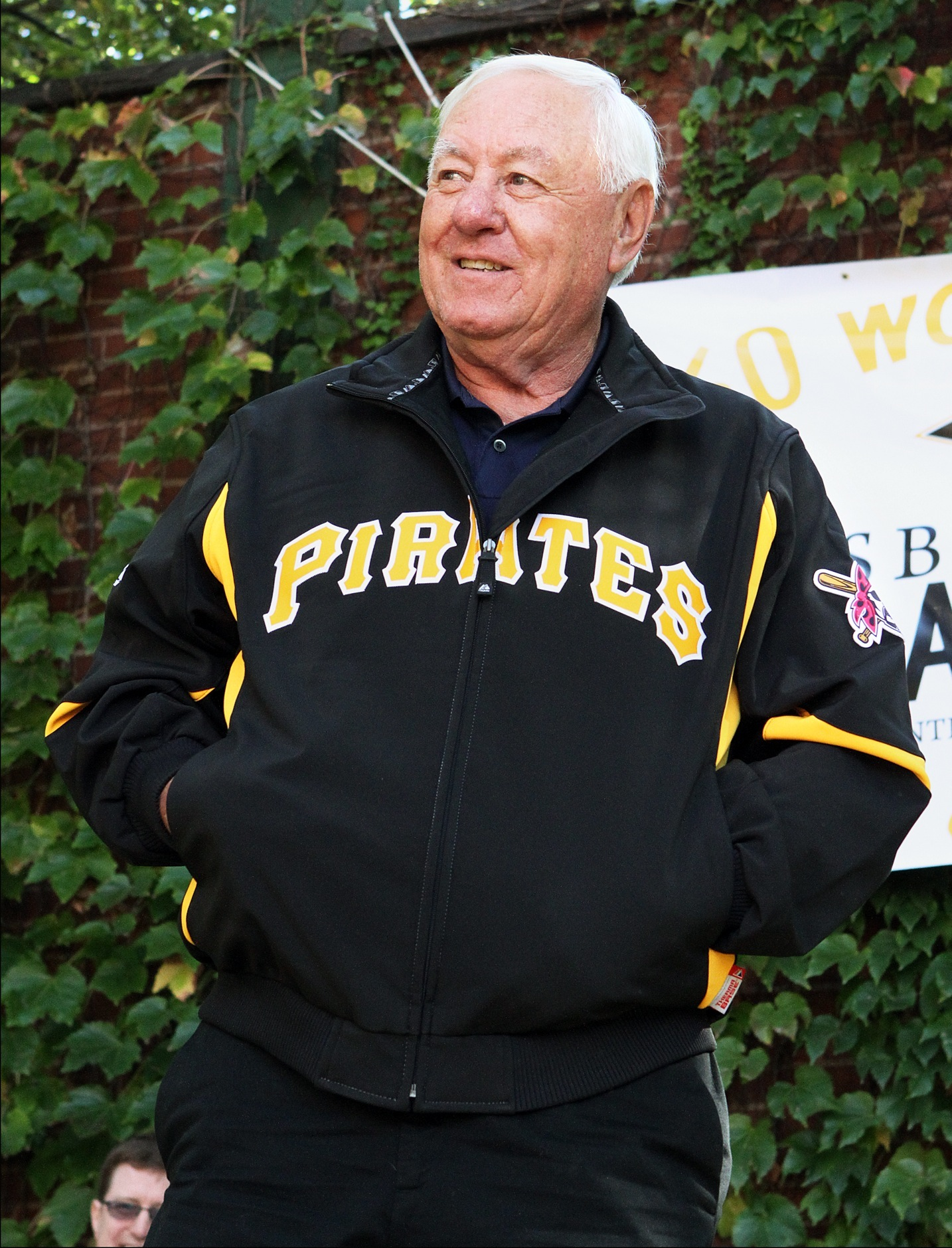
Bill Mazeroski was elected by the Veterans Committee in 2001.

The Veterans Committee can be traced back to 1939 when Commissioner of Baseball Kenesaw Mountain Landis formed the Old-Timers Committee to consider players from the 19th century for induction to the Hall of Fame. In 1939, the committee selected five players. In 1944, shortly after Landis' death, the committee voted him into the Hall via a special election. Landis was the 28th person inducted to the Hall—over the next several years, the committee added 23 more: 10 in 1945, 11 in 1946, and 2 in 1949.

In 1953, the Veterans Committee met for the first time under the name Committee on Baseball Veterans. In its first voting, the 11-member committee elected six players to the Hall. Starting in 1955, they would meet to elect up to two players in odd-numbered years. In 1959, Lee Allen succeeded Ernest Lanigan as Hall of Fame historian. According to Bill James, Paul Kerr (president of the Hall of Fame from 1961 to 1978) would generally convince the committee to select players that Allen suggested to him, until Allen's death in 1969. In 1961, the Veterans Committee expanded from 11 to 12 members. In 1962, the Veterans Committee went back to annual elections to the Hall of Fame, with the continued mandate to elect up to two players a year. In 1971, the Veterans Committee made seven selections; partly in response to such a large class, the Veterans Committee was then limited to selecting two players and one non-player every year.

Frankie Frisch, a 1947 inductee to the Hall, was a major voice on the committee in the 1970s. Backed by former teammate and fellow Hall of Famer Bill Terry and sportswriters J. Roy Stockton and Fred Lieb, who had covered Frisch's teams, he managed to get five of his teammates elected to the Hall by the committee between 1970 and 1973: Jesse Haines, Dave Bancroft, Chick Hafey, Ross Youngs, and George Kelly. Additionally, in the three years after his death, two more teammates (Jim Bottomley and Freddie Lindstrom) were elected. After Frisch died and Terry left the committee, elections were normalized.

After the 1977 election, the Veterans Committee was limited to two selections overall per year. In 1978, membership increased to 15 members; five Hall of Famers, five owners and executives, and five sportswriters. The members would meet in Florida during spring training to elect a player or two every year. The Veterans Committee mandate of up to two players was increased briefly from 1995 to 2001. In these years, the committee could elect one extra player from the Negro leagues and one from the 19th century in addition to the two regular players.

Starting in 1995, the Veterans Committee met in closed sessions to elect as many as two executives, managers, umpires, and older major league players—the categories considered in all its meetings since 1953. By a new arrangement it separately considered candidates from the Negro leagues and from the 19th century with authority to select one from each of those, via two special ballots. The older players eligible were those with ten major league seasons beginning 1946 or earlier; those who received at least 100 votes from the BBWAA in some election up to 1992; and those who received at least 60% support in some election beginning 1993. Players on Major League Baseball's ineligible list could not be elected. The committee could elect up to four people each year.

During much of its existence, the Veterans Committee consisted of 15 members selected by the Hall of Fame for defined terms. A six-man subcommittee of this group met as a screening committee to determine who would be on the ballot. The committee met annually to consider candidates in four separate categories: players, managers, umpires, and executives. The Veterans Committee met privately, and its ballots and voting results were generally not revealed prior to 2003. From the mid-1970s until 2001, the top candidate in each category was elected to the Hall of Fame if he earned at least 75% of the committee's votes.

The Board of Directors reformed the system radically with new rules enacted in August 2001. Formerly, 15 members were appointed to limited terms; the new Veterans Committee would comprise all living members of the Hall, plus recipients of the Spink and Frick awards to writers and broadcasters. In particular, the new members were 61 living Hall of Famers, 13 living recipients of the J. G. Taylor Spink Award, 13 living recipients of the Ford C. Frick Award, and three members of the previous committee with terms that had not yet expired. Elections for players retired more than 20 years would be held every other year and elections for (managers, umpires and executives) would be held every fourth year. The first cycle for both categories would be in 2002 and 2003 for induction in 2003.

== Revisions to the voting process ==
=== 2001 revisions ===
In 2001, the Hall of Fame radically changed the composition and election procedures for the Veterans Committee, which was revised to consist of:

- All living members of the Hall of Fame;
- All living recipients of the Ford C. Frick Award for baseball broadcasters;
- And all living recipients of the J. G. Taylor Spink Award for baseball writers.

All members of the former Veterans Committee remained active until the expiration of their terms. Only two were on the committee for the 2003 election, the first under the new election procedures. Only one of the former Veterans Committee members (John McHale) remained on the committee for the 2005 and 2007 elections, and his term expired immediately after the 2007 election.

The election procedures instituted in 2003 are listed below. The procedures were changed again in 2007. Rules, and portions thereof, that changed in 2007 are indicated in italics.

- Elections for players would now be held every two years, starting in 2003.
- Managers, umpires, and executives would be elected from a single composite ballot every four years, starting in 2003.
- The Historical Overview Committee, a ten-member panel appointed by the secretary-treasurer of the Baseball Writers' Association of America, created an initial list of figures from whom both ballots would be created. At this point, the players' ballot consisted of 200 players.
- Ballots were screened by two groups – a sixty-member panel drawn from the membership of the BBWAA, and a panel of six living Hall of Famers selected by the Hall of Fame Board. The Hall of Famer panel selected five players for the players' ballot, and the BBWAA panel selected twenty-five players for the players' ballot, as well as all candidates for the composite ballot.
- The selections of the Hall of Famer and BBWAA panels were then merged, creating a single players' ballot. Players chosen on both ballots appeared only once on this ballot, which now contained a minimum of twenty-five and a maximum of thirty players.
- The players' ballot and composite ballot (fifteen candidates) are made public before voting.
- Balloting is held by mail, with a stated deadline.
- The Veterans Committee vote is made public after voting.
- All candidates who receive 75% or more of the vote are elected; election is no longer restricted to only the top vote-getter.
- Every player with ten or more years of major-league experience who has not been active in the previous twenty years, and is not on Major League Baseball's ineligible list, is eligible for Veterans Committee consideration. In the past, players who did not receive a certain percentage of the votes on a BBWAA ballot were permanently ineligible for Hall of Fame consideration.

Using these procedures, no one was elected to the Hall of Fame by the Veterans Committee in 2003, 2005, or 2007.

=== 2007 revisions ===
Following the 2007 elections, the makeup of the committee was again changed, and several procedures were also modified:

==== Changes affecting all elections ====
- The Historical Overview Committee will continue to formulate the players and managers/umpires ballots, but it will now present a players' ballot of only twenty players and a managers/umpires ballot of only ten figures. The executives ballot, consisting of ten individuals, will be formulated by the voting body for that ballot.

==== Changes affecting player elections ====
- The players ballot is now restricted to players whose careers began in 1943 or later.
- Voting for the players ballot is now restricted to Hall of Fame members. Winners of the Frick and Spink Awards are considered "honorees" and are thus ineligible to vote on the main players ballot.
- The list of those eligible for the players ballot will be separately reviewed by a six-member panel of Hall of Famers, which will select five players for the ballot.
- Next, all living Hall of Famers are invited to a meeting at the Hall of Fame during induction weekend. The Hall of Famers who are present at this meeting will narrow the list to a final ballot of 10 players.
- The final players ballot is sent to all living Hall of Famers, who can vote for as many as four individuals.

==== Pre World War II players ====
- Players whose careers began before 1943 are now considered every five years by a committee of twelve Hall of Famers, writers, and baseball historians, to be chosen by the Hall of Fame Board. The first election of pre-World War II players was conducted in 2009.

==== Changes affecting non-player elections ====
- The composite ballot will be split into two separate ballots, one for managers and umpires and the other for executives.
- Voting on the managers/umpires and executives ballots will now be conducted for induction in even-numbered years, starting with the class of 2008.
- The voting body for the managers/umpires ballot will be a sixteen-member body of Hall of Famers, executives, and media veterans appointed by the Hall of Fame Board.
- The voting body for the executives ballot will be a separate twelve-member body of Hall of Famers, executives, and media veterans appointed by the Hall of Fame Board.
- Each ballot is presented to the applicable voting board. As is the case for the players' ballot, each voter can choose as many as four individuals.

The threshold for induction remained at 75% of all who voted on the appropriate ballot. In the first election held under the new rules, two managers and three executives were elected in December 2007 as part of the 2008 election process.

=== 2010 revisions ===
The Hall announced a new Veterans Committee voting process on June 26, 2010, effective with the 2011 election process that began late in 2010. The two biggest changes are:

- Managers, umpires, executives, and players will now be considered on a single ballot.
- Living Hall of Fame members will no longer constitute a single electoral body. Instead, separate 16-member subcommittees will be created to vote on individuals from different eras of baseball.

Candidates were classified by the time-periods that cover their greatest contributions:

- Pre-Integration Era (1871–1946)
- Golden Era (1947–1972)
- Expansion Era (1973 and later)

Candidates from each era were considered every third year, starting with the Expansion Era in the 2011 election (December 2010, 2013), followed by the Golden Era (December 2011, 2014) and then by the Pre-Integration Era (December 2012, 2015).

The existing Historical Overview Committee formulated each ballot for release in the October or November before the next planned induction ceremony. The Expansion Era ballot included 12 candidates, while the other two ballots included ten each. The Hall's Board of Directors selected 16-member committees for each era, made up of Hall of Famers, executives, baseball historians, and media members. Each committee convened at the Winter Meetings in December to consider and vote on candidates from its assigned era. As before, the threshold of induction remained at 75% of those voting.

=== 2016 revisions ===
On July 23, 2016, the Hall of Fame announced changes to the Era Committee system. Highlighting these changes was a restructuring of the time-frames to be considered, with a much greater emphasis on modern eras. Additionally, those major league players, managers, umpires and executives who excelled before 1950, as well Negro leagues stars, would still be afforded an opportunity to have their careers reviewed, but with less frequency.

Separate 16-member subcommittees were defined to vote on individuals from different eras of baseball, with candidates still being classified by the time-periods that covered their greatest contributions:

- Early Baseball (1871–1949)
- Golden Days (1950–1969)
- Modern Baseball (1970–1987)
- Today's Game (1988–present)

The size of all committee ballots was set at 10 candidates. Whilst there was previously a one-year waiting period after elimination from annual BBWAA consideration, that waiting period was removed. The Today's Game and Modern Baseball committees were scheduled to convene twice every five years, the Golden Days committee once every five years, and the Early Baseball committee once every 10 years.

While meetings take place in December, voting was included with the induction class for the following calendar year (e.g. December 2016 committee balloting was part of 2017 Hall of Fame elections and induction).

Committee meeting rotation
Meeting year	Induction year	Era Committee(s) meeting
2016	2017	Today's Game
2017	2018	Modern Baseball
2018	2019	Today's Game
2019	~~2020~~ 2021	Modern Baseball
2021	2022	Golden Days, Early Baseball

The induction ceremony originally scheduled for July 26, 2020, was cancelled due to the COVID-19 pandemic; persons originally scheduled for induction in 2020 were inducted in 2021. Committee meetings originally scheduled for December 2020 (Golden Days and Early Baseball) were postponed for a year, due to the COVID-19 pandemic. Committee scheduling for 2022 and beyond is not presented here, as the structure of committees was further amended in April 2022.

The criteria for committee eligibility differed for players, managers, and executives:

- Players: Must be retired for at least 15 years. This means that no player will be eligible for committee consideration until a minimum of 10 years after he first becomes eligible to appear on the BBWAA ballot, regardless of whether or not he appears on a ballot.
  - The Hall has not yet established a policy on the timing of eligibility for committee consideration for players who die while active or during the standard 5-year waiting period for BBWAA eligibility. In these instances, the standard waiting period for BBWAA eligibility of 5 years from retirement is shortened to 6 months from death.
- Managers and umpires: Must have at least 10 years of service in that role, and either be (1) retired for at least 5 years or (2) at least age 65 and retired for 6 months.
- Executives: Must be retired for at least 5 years, or be at least age 70. Executives who meet the age cutoff will be considered regardless of their positions in an organization or their currently active statuses. Previously, active executives 65 years or older were eligible for consideration.

=== 2022 revisions ===
The Hall of Fame announced additional changes to its era committees on April 22, 2022, effective immediately. The multiple eras previously utilized were collapsed into just two eras: the Contemporary Baseball Era (1980–present) and the Classic Baseball Era (prior to 1980). An annual rotation of three ballots was also defined:

- Contemporary Baseball Era players: balloting in December 2022 for the class of 2023
- Contemporary Baseball Era non-players (managers, executives, and umpires): balloting in December 2023 for the class of 2024
- Classic Baseball Era: balloting in December 2024 for the class of 2025

The rotation will then continue every three years. A one-year waiting period beyond potential BBWAA eligibility (which had been abolished in 2016) was reintroduced, thus restricting the committee to considering players retired for at least 16 seasons.

In 2025, the eligibility rules were modified to require a candidate who did not receive a minimum of five votes to skip consideration for their next ballot cycle and wait six years for reconsideration; additionally, any candidate who fails to receive five votes on multiple ballots will be barred from any further consideration in the future.

== Committee members ==
=== 1953–2001 ===
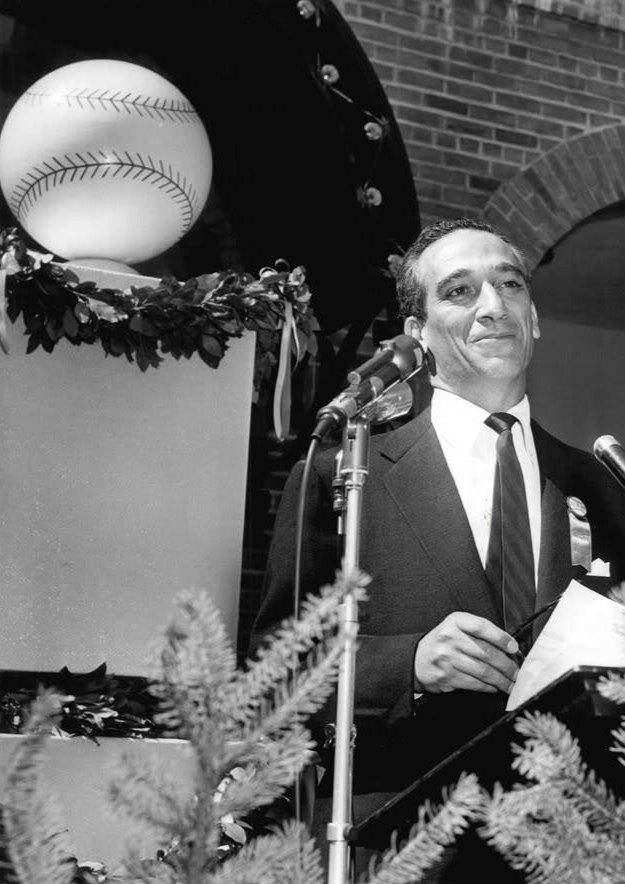
Shirley Povich as master of ceremonies at Cooperstown, 1955

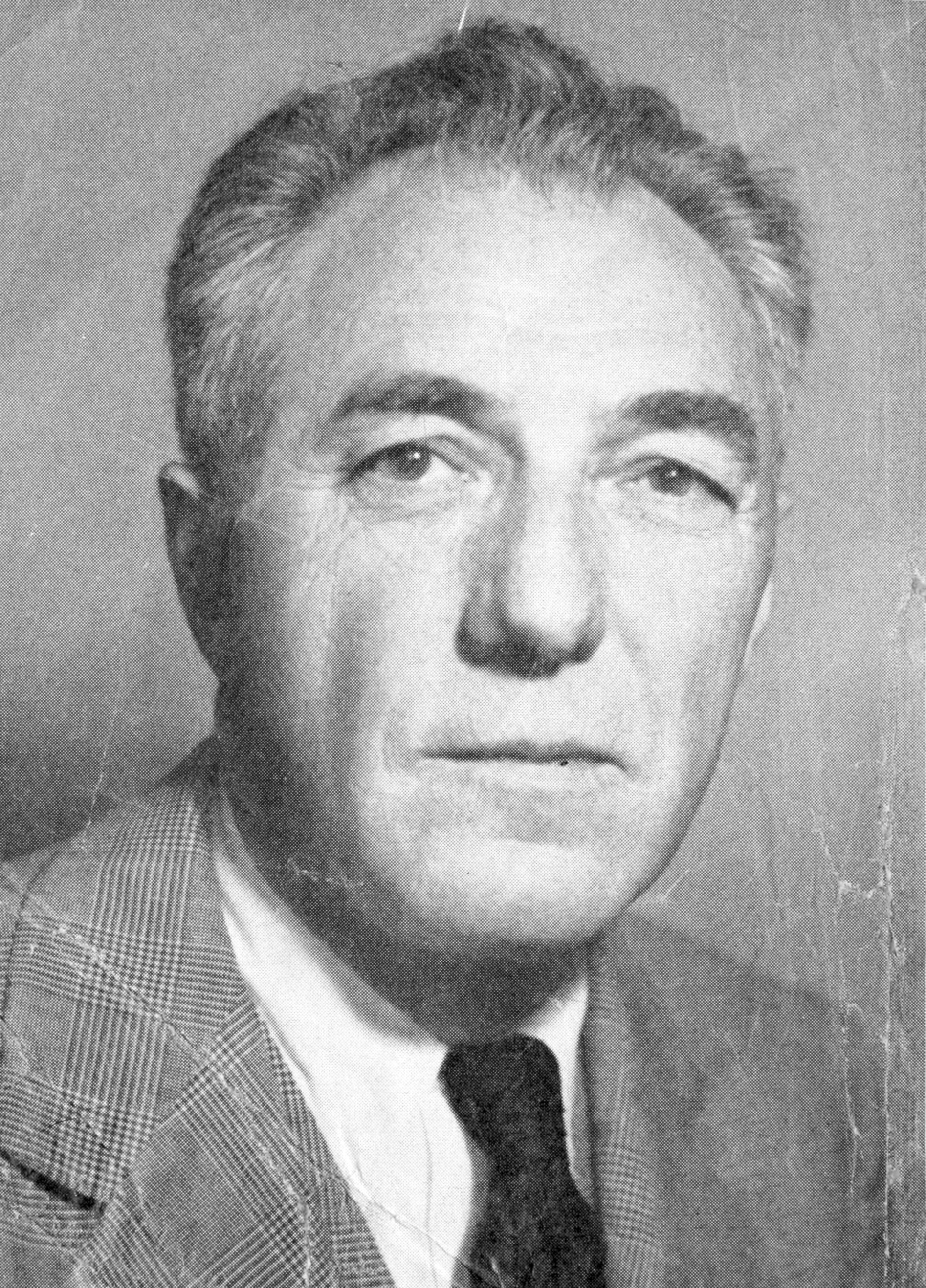
Commissioner of Baseball Ford Frick in 1962

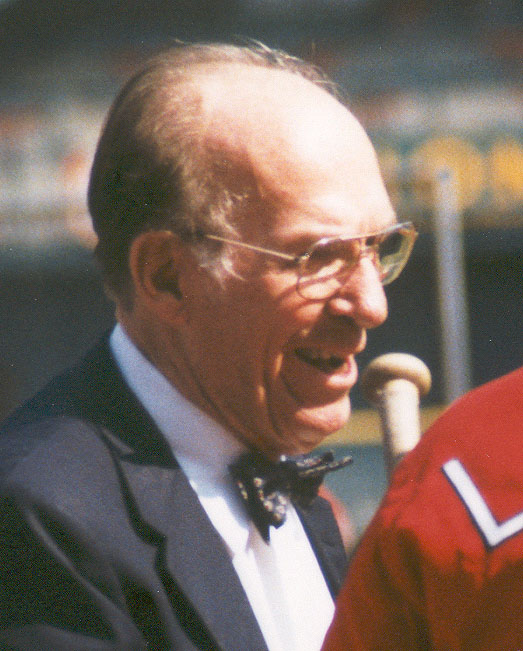
Bob Broeg, sportswriter

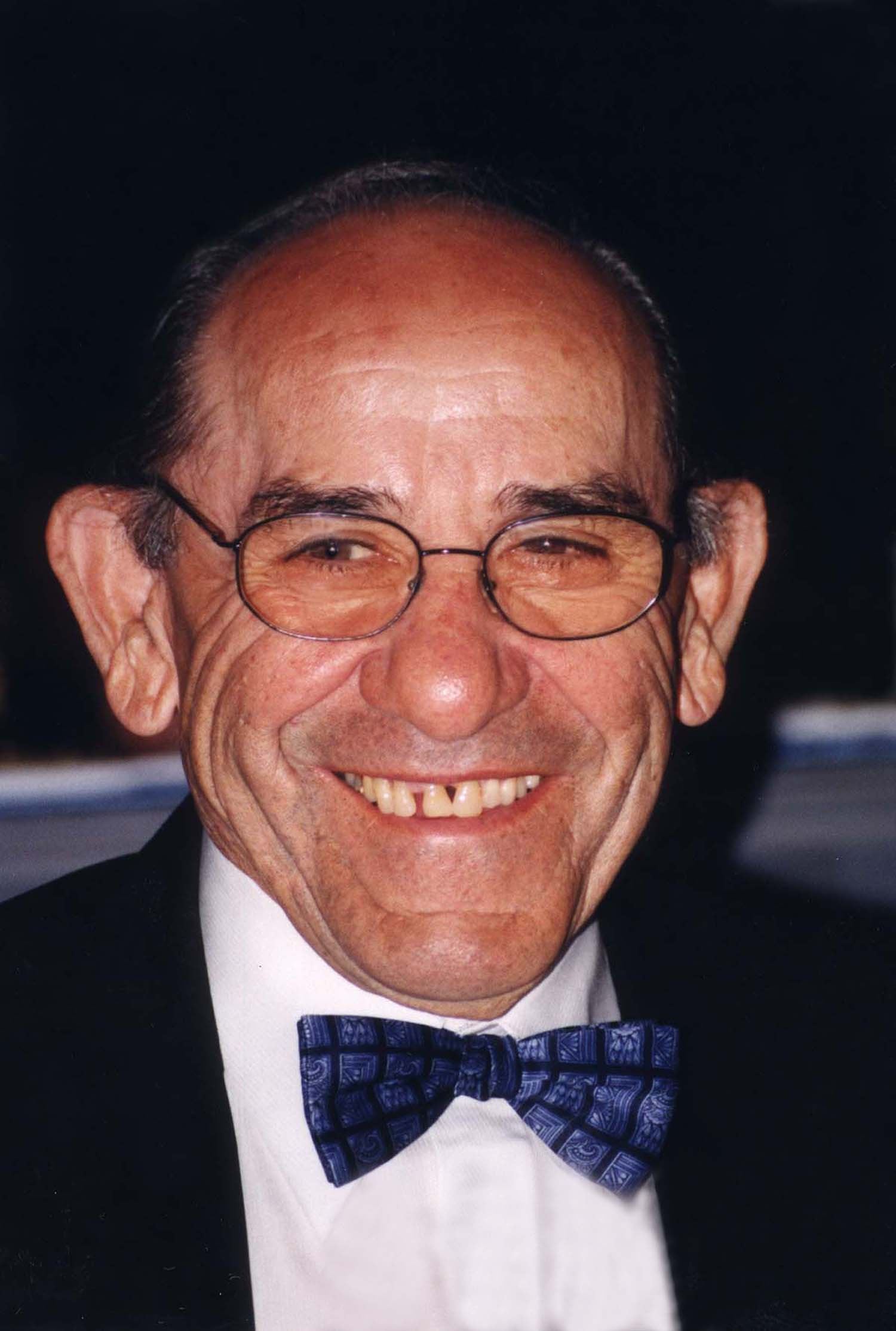
1972 Hall of Fame inductee Yogi Berra

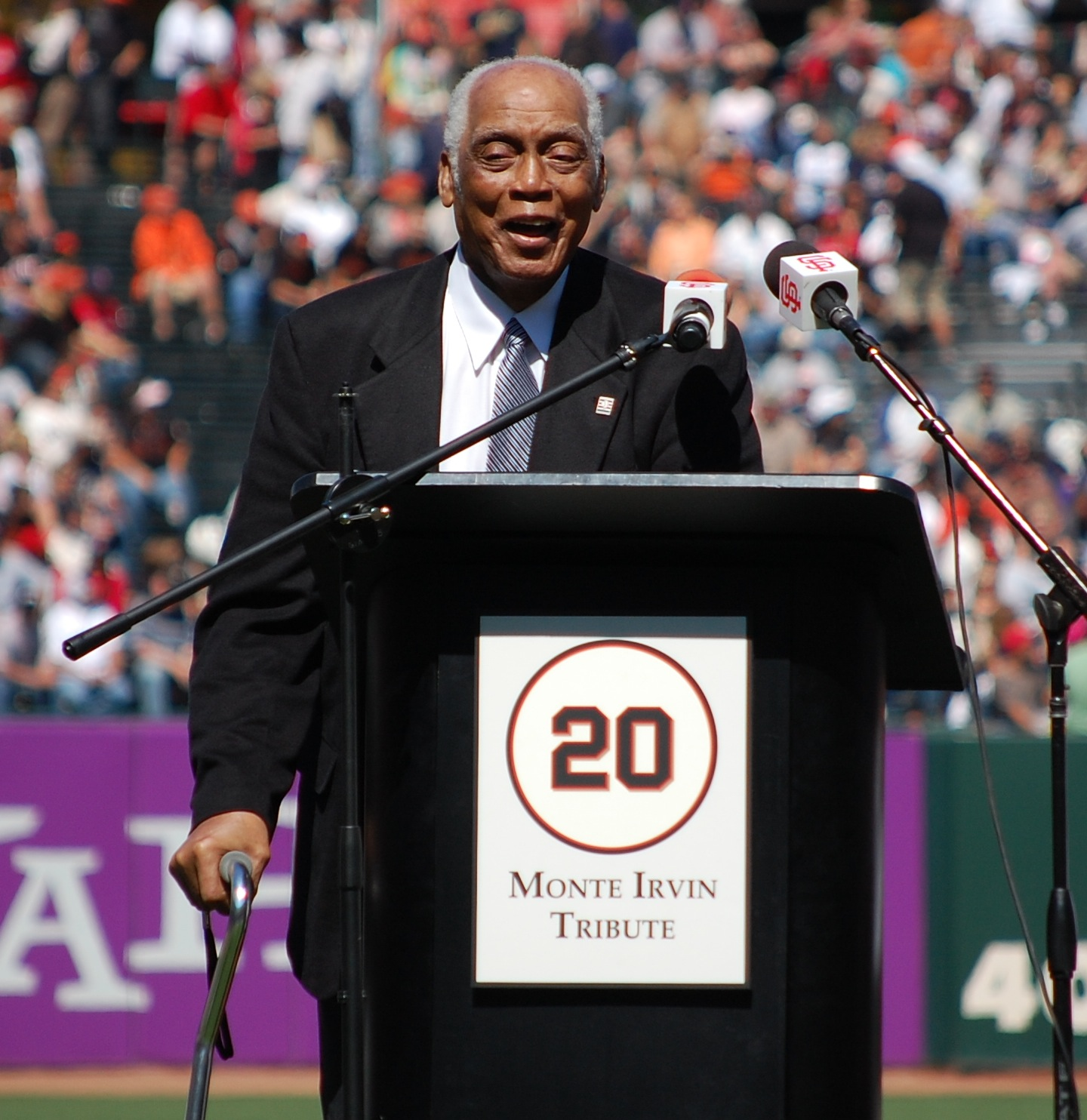
1973 Hall of Fame inductee Monte Irvin

The following is a list of members of the Veterans Committee from its establishment in 1953 to its radical reformation in 2001, along with the dates of their membership.

- J. G. Taylor Spink, publisher of The Sporting News from 1914 to 1962, chairman of the committee (1953–1959)
- Warren Brown, sportswriter who, among other things, is credited with giving Babe Ruth the nickname "The Sultan of Swat" (1953–1965)
- Charlie Gehringer, Hall of Fame second baseman (1953–1992)
- Warren Giles, President of the National League from 1951 to 1969; general manager of the Cincinnati Reds from 1937 to 1951 (1953–1978)
- Frank Graham, sportswriter of the New York Journal-American. (1953–1965)
- Will Harridge, President of the American League from 1931 to 1959 (1953–1971)
- Paul Kerr, director of the Clark Foundation which funded the Hall, and future President of the Baseball Hall of Fame (1953–1978)
- John Malaney sportswriter for The Boston Post and former BBWAA President (1953–1959)
- Branch Rickey, who helped pioneer the farm system as general manager of the St. Louis Cardinals from 1919 to 1942, signed Jackie Robinson who broke the color barrier as president and general manager of the Brooklyn Dodgers from 1942 to 1950, and was at this time active general manager of the Pittsburgh Pirates, a position he held from 1950 to 1955 (1953–1965)
- Charlie Segar, former sportswriter, and secretary-treasurer of the National League from 1951 to 1971 (1953–1993)
- Frank Shaughnessy, President of the International League from 1936 to 1960 (1953–1969)
- J. Roy Stockton, sportswriter for the St. Louis Post-Dispatch from 1918 to 1958, where he mostly covered the St. Louis Cardinals (1961–1971)
- Dan Daniel, prolific sportswriter whose contributions over a long period led him to be called the dean of American baseball writers (1961–1976)
- Joe Cronin, Hall of Fame shortstop [inducted in 1956] who also served as manager for the Boston Red Sox from 1935 to 1947, general manager for the Red Sox from 1947 to 1959, and President of the American League from 1959 to 1973 (1961–1984)
- Ford Frick, National League President from 1934 to 1951 and Commissioner of Baseball from 1951 to 1965 (1966–1969)
- Fred Lieb, sportswriter best known for nicknaming Yankee Stadium as "The House Ruth Built" (1966–1980)
- Frankie Frisch, Hall of Fame second baseman [inducted 1947], who also served as manager (most notably for the St. Louis Cardinals from 1933 to 1938) and radio play-by-play announcer for Boston and the New York Giants (1967–1973)
- Waite Hoyt, Hall of Fame pitcher [inducted 1969] who also served as radio play-by-play announcer for the Cincinnati Reds from 1942 to 1965 (1971–1976)
- Bill Terry, Hall of Fame first baseman [inducted 1954], manager of the New York Giants from 1932 to 1941 (1971–1976)
- Bob Broeg, sportswriter who covered the St. Louis Cardinals for 40 years, served on the Hall of Fame's Board of Directors from 1972 to 2000 (1972–2000)
- Bill DeWitt, general manager of the St. Louis Browns from 1937 to 1951, and of the Cincinnati Reds from 1960 to 1966 (1973–1981)
- Stan Musial, Hall of Fame outfielder and first baseman [inducted 1969] and general manager of the St. Louis Cardinals in 1967 (1973–2001)
- Burleigh Grimes, Hall of Fame pitcher [inducted 1964] and longtime scout (1977–1985)
- Edgar Munzel, sportswriter who wrote for the Chicago Herald-Examiner and Chicago Sun-Times from 1929 to 1973 (1977–1996)
- Bob Addie, sportswriter who covered baseball for The Washington Post and Washington Times-Herald (1978–1981)
- Joe Reichler, sportswriter for the Associated Press from 1943 to 1966 who mostly covered baseball teams in New York City (1978–1988)
- Roy Campanella, Hall of Fame catcher [inducted 1969] (1978–1993)
- Buzzie Bavasi, general manager for the Brooklyn/Los Angeles Dodgers [1950–1968], the San Diego Padres [1968–1972] and the California Angels [1977–1984] (1978–1999)
- Al López, Hall of Fame manager [inducted 1977] for the Cleveland Indians [1951–1956] and Chicago White Sox [1957–1965, 1968–1969] (1978–1994)
- Gabe Paul, general manager for the Cincinnati Reds [1951–1960], Cleveland Indians [1961–1969, 1971–1971] and New York Yankees [1974–1977], and President of the Cleveland Indians [1963–1971, 1978–1985] and New York Yankees [1973–1977] (1978–1993)
- Joe L. Brown, general manager of the Pittsburgh Pirates from 1955 to 1976 (1979–2001)
- Birdie Tebbetts, manager for the Cincinnati Reds [1954–1958], Milwaukee Braves [1961–1962] and Cleveland Indians [1964–1966] and longtime scout [1968–1997] (1979–1993)
- Allen Lewis, sportswriter for The Philadelphia Inquirer from 1949 to 1979 (1979–2000)
- Buck O'Neil, Negro league first baseman and manager, first African-American coach in Major League Baseball, longtime scout for the Chicago Cubs and Kansas City Royals and member of the Baseball Scouts Hall of Fame in St. Louis (1981–2001)
- Milton Richman, sportswriter for the United Press International from 1944 until his death in 1986 (1983–1986)
- Monte Irvin, Hall of Fame left fielder from the Negro leagues [1938–1942, 1948] and MLB New York Giants [1949–1955] and Chicago Cubs [1956] [inducted 1973]
- Bob Fishel, executive for the St. Louis Browns [1946–1953] and New York Yankees [1954–1974], and American League executive vice president [1974–1988] (1985–1988)
- Ted Williams, Hall of Fame left fielder (1986–2000)
- Shirley Povich, sportswriter for The Washington Post from 1923 until his death in 1998 (1987–1993)
- Red Barber, radio play-by-play announcer for the Cincinnati Reds [1934–1938], Brooklyn Dodgers [1939–1953] and New York Yankees [1954–1966] (1988–1990)
- Ernie Harwell, play-by-play announcer, most notably for the Detroit Tigers [1960–1991, 1993–2002] (1988–1995; 2001)
- Billy Herman, Hall of Fame second baseman [inducted 1975]
- Jack Brickhouse, play-by-play announcer for the Chicago Cubs from 1948 to 1981 (1991–1993)
- Yogi Berra, Hall of Fame catcher [inducted 1972]
- Pee Wee Reese, Hall of Fame shortstop [inducted 1984] and television play-by-play announcer (1994–1999)
- Bill White, sportscaster and National League president from 1989 to 1994 (1994–2001)
- Ken Coleman, play-by-play announcer for the Cleveland Indians [1954–1963], Boston Red Sox [1965–1974, 1979–1989] and Cincinnati Reds [1975–1978] (1996–2003)
- Leonard Koppett, sportswriter and author
- Hank Peters, general manager of the Baltimore Orioles from 1975 to 1987 and GM of the Cleveland Indians from 1987 to 1992 (1996–2001)
- Jerome Holtzman, sportswriter for the Chicago Sun-Times from 1943 to 1981 and the Chicago Tribune from 1981 to 1999, creator of the save statistic, and official historian of Major League Baseball from 1999 until his death in 2008 (1998–2001)
- Hank Aaron, Hall of Fame right fielder [inducted 1982] and senior vice president for the Atlanta Braves since 1980 (2000–2021)
- John McHale, general manager for the Milwaukee/Atlanta Braves [1959–1966] and Montreal Expos [1978–1984], president of the Montreal Expos [1969–1986] (2000–2007)

=== 2008 ===
As of December 2008, for 2009 Baseball Hall of Fame balloting, members of the Veterans Committee were:

Pre-1943 Veterans Committee members

Hall of Famers

- Bobby Doerr
- Ralph Kiner
- Phil Niekro
- Duke Snider
- Don Sutton
- Dick Williams

Historians

- Furman Bisher
- Roland Hemond
- Steve Hirdt
- Bill Madden
- Claire Smith

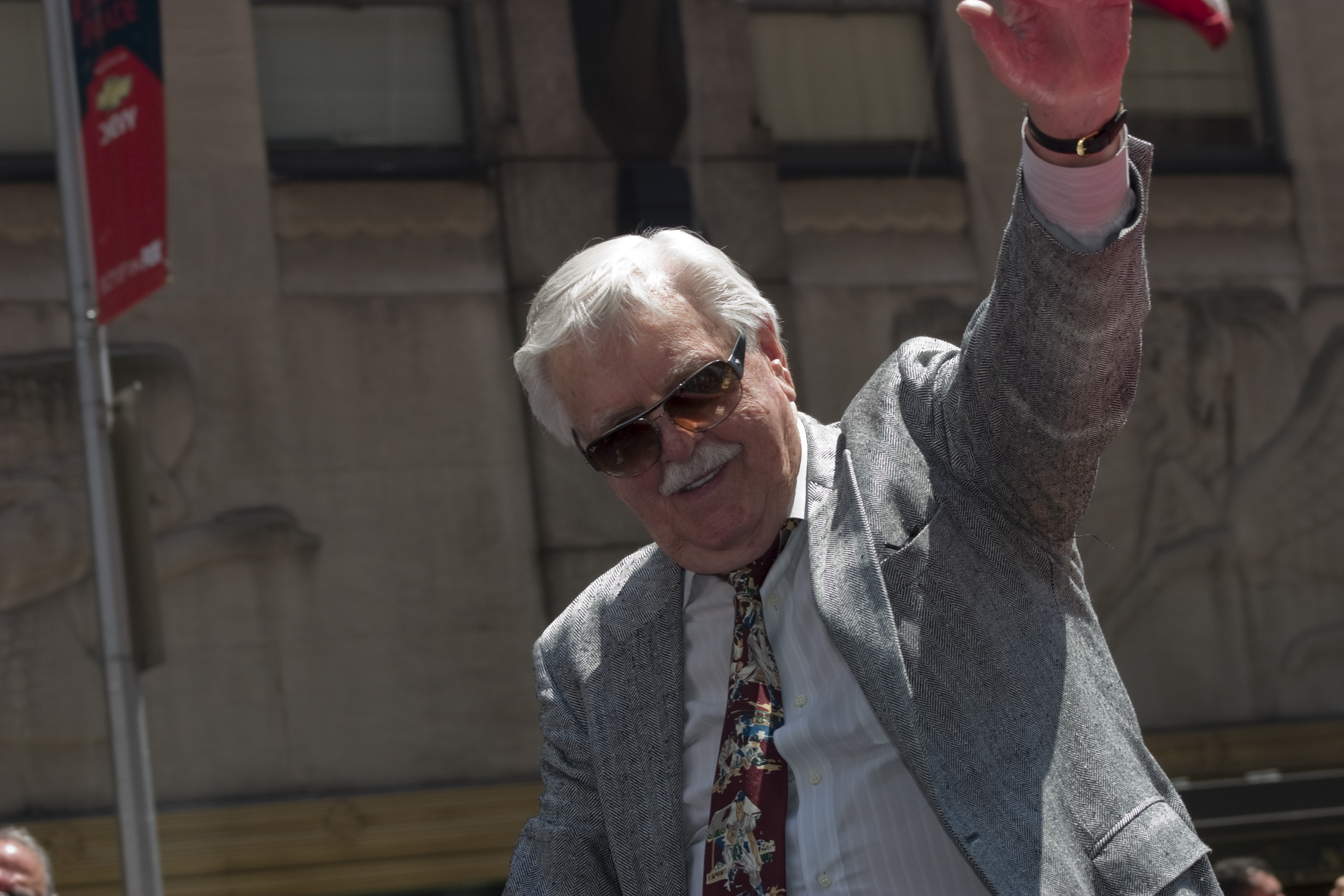
Dick Williams

Post-1942 Veterans Committee members (67)

- Hank Aaron
- Sparky Anderson
- Luis Aparicio
- Ernie Banks
- Johnny Bench
- Yogi Berra
- Wade Boggs
- George Brett
- Lou Brock
- Jim Bunning
- Rod Carew
- Steve Carlton
- Gary Carter
- Orlando Cepeda
- Andre Dawson
- Bobby Doerr
- Dennis Eckersley
- Bob Feller
- Rollie Fingers
- Carlton Fisk
- Whitey Ford
- Bob Gibson
- Goose Gossage
- Tony Gwynn
- Rickey Henderson
- Monte Irvin
- Reggie Jackson
- Ferguson Jenkins
- Al Kaline
- George Kell
- Harmon Killebrew
- Ralph Kiner
- Sandy Koufax
- Tommy Lasorda
- Lee MacPhail
- Juan Marichal
- Willie Mays
- Bill Mazeroski
- Willie McCovey
- Paul Molitor
- Joe Morgan
- Eddie Murray
- Stan Musial
- Phil Niekro
- Jim Palmer
- Tony Pérez
- Gaylord Perry
- Jim Rice
- Cal Ripken Jr.
- Brooks Robinson
- Frank Robinson
- Nolan Ryan
- Ryne Sandberg
- Mike Schmidt
- Red Schoendienst
- Tom Seaver
- Ozzie Smith
- Duke Snider
- Bruce Sutter
- Don Sutton
- Earl Weaver
- Billy Williams
- Dick Williams
- Dave Winfield
- Carl Yastrzemski
- Robin Yount

=== 2010 ===
As of November 2010, for 2011 Baseball Hall of Fame balloting, the only committee members announced were those voting for the post-1972 Expansion Era candidates:

Hall of Famers

- Johnny Bench
- Whitey Herzog
- Eddie Murray
- Jim Palmer
- Tony Pérez
- Frank Robinson
- Ryne Sandberg
- Ozzie Smith

Executives

- Bill Giles
- David Glass
- Andy MacPhail
- Jerry Reinsdorf

Media

- Bob Elliott
- Tim Kurkjian
- Ross Newhan
- Tom Verducci

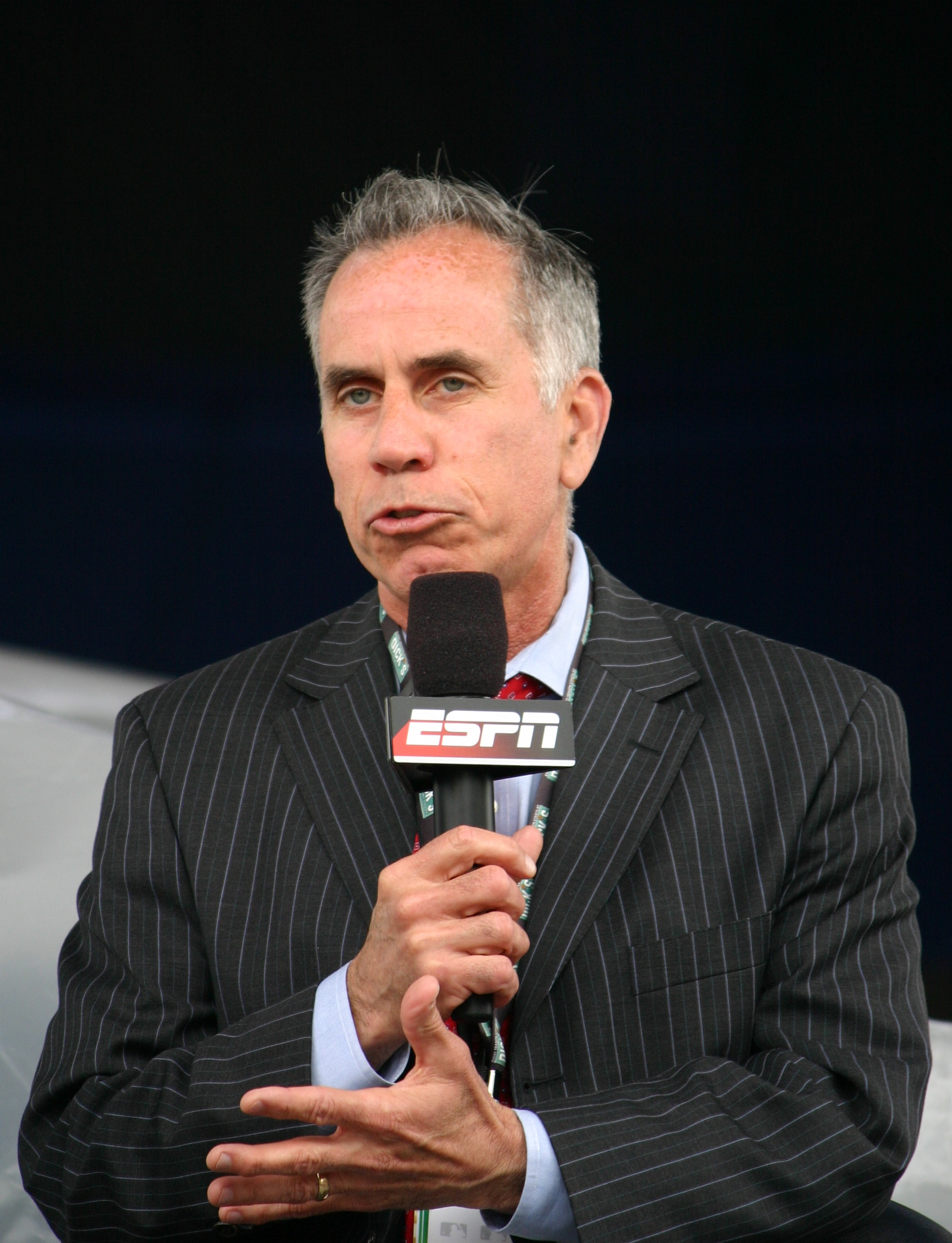
Tim Kurkjian

=== 2011 ===
As of November 2011, for 2012 Baseball Hall of Fame balloting, the 16-member Golden Era Committee was announced:

Hall of Famers

- Hank Aaron
- Pat Gillick
- Al Kaline
- Ralph Kiner
- Tommy Lasorda
- Juan Marichal
- Brooks Robinson
- Billy Williams

Executives

- Paul Beeston
- Bill DeWitt
- Roland Hemond
- Gene Michael
- Al Rosen

Media

- Dick Kaegel
- Jack O'Connell
- Dave Van Dyck

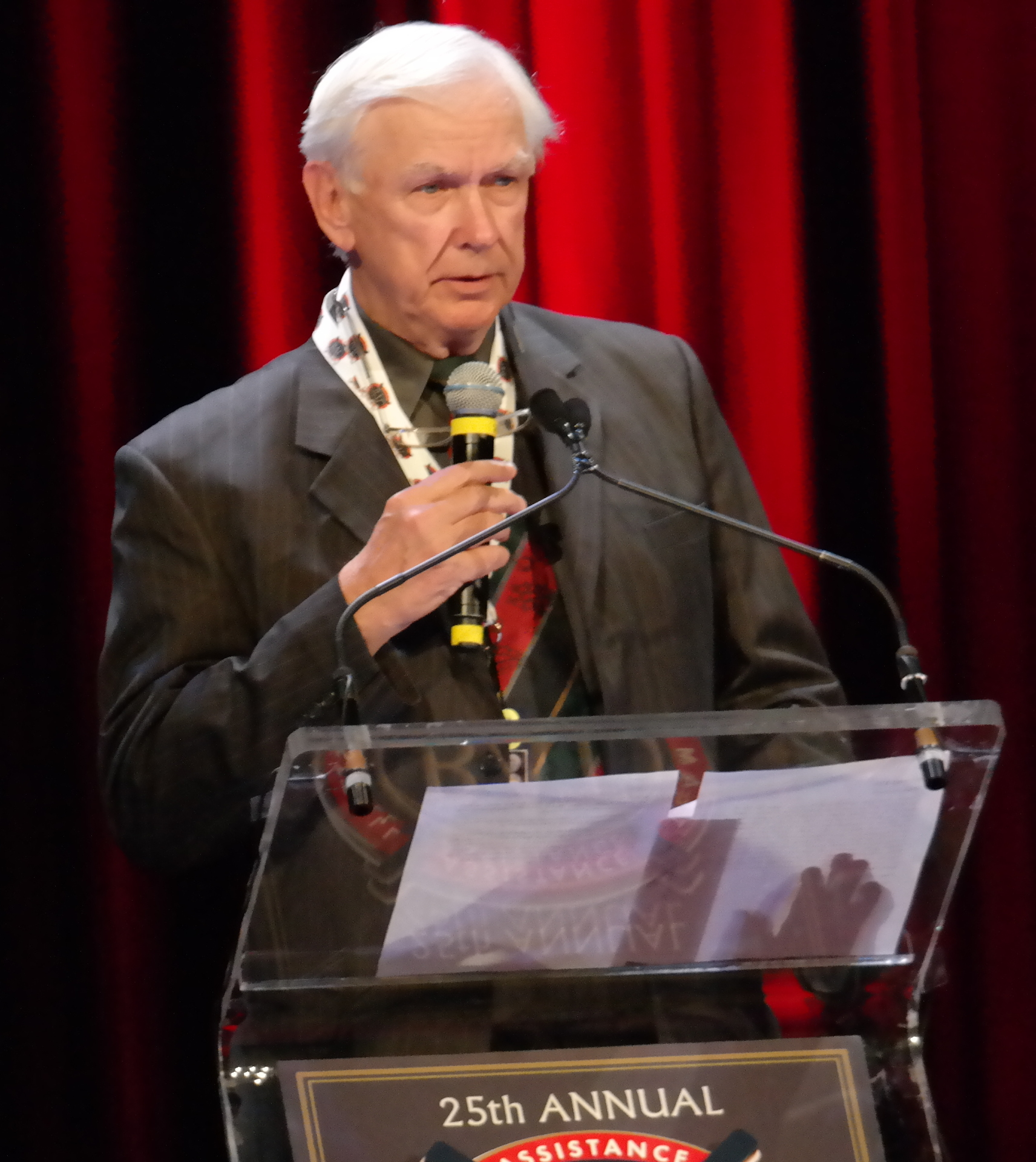
Gene Michael

=== 2012 ===
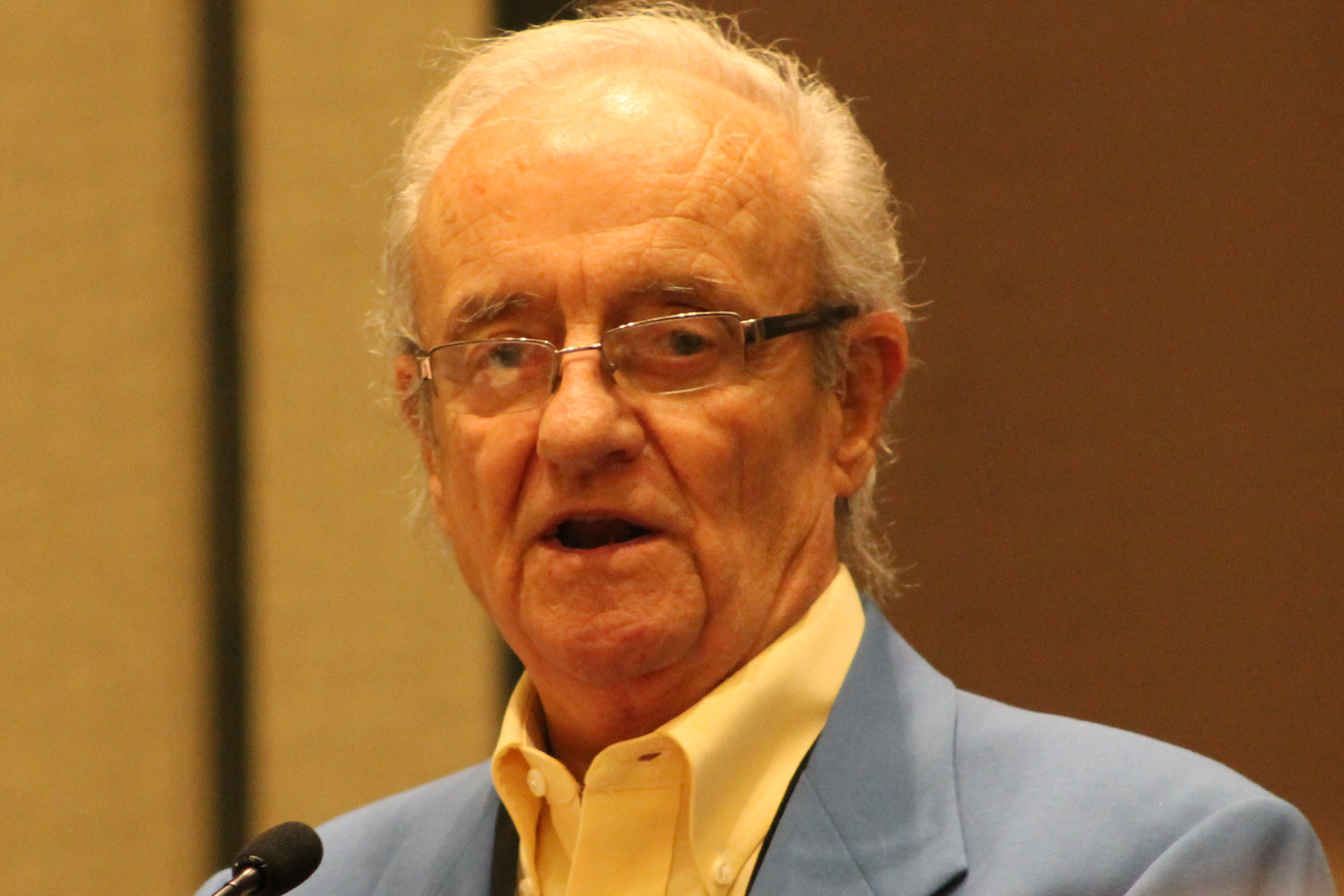
Roland Hemond

As of November 2012, for 2013 Baseball Hall of Fame balloting, the 16-member Pre-Integration Era Committee was announced:

- Executives: Bill DeWitt, Pat Gillick, Roland Hemond, Gary Hughes
- Former players: Bert Blyleven, Phil Niekro, Don Sutton, Bob Watson
- Historians: Jim Henneman, Steve Hirdt, Tom Simon, Mark Whicker
- Media members: Peter Morris, Phil Pepe, Claire Smith, T. R. Sullivan

=== 2013 ===
The Pre-Integration Committee's 16-member voting electorate, appointed by the Hall of Fame's Board of Directors, was announced at the same time as the ballot of 10 candidates:

- Hall of Famers: Bert Blyleven, Pat Gillick, Phil Niekro, Don Sutton
- Executives: Bill DeWitt, Roland Hemond, Gary Hughes, Bob Watson
- Media and historians: Jim Henneman, Steve Hirdt, Peter Morris, Phil Pepe, Tom Simon, Claire Smith, T.R. Sullivan, Mark Whicker

=== 2014 ===
The Expansion Era Committee's 16-member voting electorate, appointed by the Hall of Fame's Board of Directors, was announced at the same time as the ballot of 12 candidates. The Hall officially calls this group the "Expansion Era Committee", but media still generally refer to it as the "Veterans Committee".

- Hall of Famers: Rod Carew, Carlton Fisk, Whitey Herzog, Tommy Lasorda, Joe Morgan, Paul Molitor, Phil Niekro, Frank Robinson
- Executives: Paul Beeston, Andy MacPhail, Dave Montgomery, Jerry Reinsdorf
- Media and historians: Steve Hirdt, Bruce Jenkins, Jack O'Connor, Jim Reeves

=== 2015 ===
The Golden Era Committee's 16-member voting electorate, appointed by the Hall of Fame's Board of Directors, was announced at the same time as the ballot of 10 candidates. The Baseball Hall of Fame officially named this group the "Golden Era Committee" ("The Committee"), which voted for the first time on December 5, 2011. All of the Hall of Fame members on this committee were inducted as players, except for executive Pat Gillick.

- Hall of Famers: Jim Bunning, Rod Carew, Pat Gillick, Ferguson Jenkins, Al Kaline, Joe Morgan, Ozzie Smith, Don Sutton
- Executives: Jim Frey, David Glass, Roland Hemond, Bob Watson
- Media: Steve Hirdt, Dick Kaegel, Phil Pepe, Tracy Ringolsby

=== 2016 ===
The Pre-Integration ballot for election was released on October 5, 2015; final voting was conducted by the Pre-Integration Committee, a 16-member body which met at baseball's winter meetings in Nashville on December 6, with 75% (12 of 16 votes) required for election; results were announced the following morning. The committee's members, appointed by the Hall of Fame's board of directors, were announced later in fall 2015 and included members of the Hall, baseball executives, members of the media and historians:

- Hall of Famers: Bert Blyleven, Bobby Cox, Pat Gillick and Phil Niekro
- Executives: Chuck Armstrong, Bill DeWitt, Gary Hughes and Tal Smith
- Media/Historians: Steve Hirdt, Peter Morris, Jack O'Connell, Claire Smith, Tim Sullivan, T.R. Sullivan, Gary Thorne and Tim Wendel

Blyleven, Gillick, Niekro, DeWitt, Hughes, Hirdt, Morris, Smith and T.R. Sullivan previously served on the committee which selected the 2013 inductees. For the second consecutive year, none of the candidates received enough votes for election; it marked the third consecutive year – and the fifth time in seven years – in which no former players were chosen by the Hall's special committees. Speaking on MLB Network's Hot Stove immediately after it broadcast the announcement, Major League Baseball's official historian John Thorn expressed surprise and disappointment at the results, noting that he had felt there were three particularly strong candidates (prior to the announcement, he had commented favorably on the candidacies of Doc Adams and Harry Stovey); he speculated that the number of good candidates may have deadlocked the voting once again, and suggested that the Hall may need to amend the voting process in the future.

=== 2017 ===
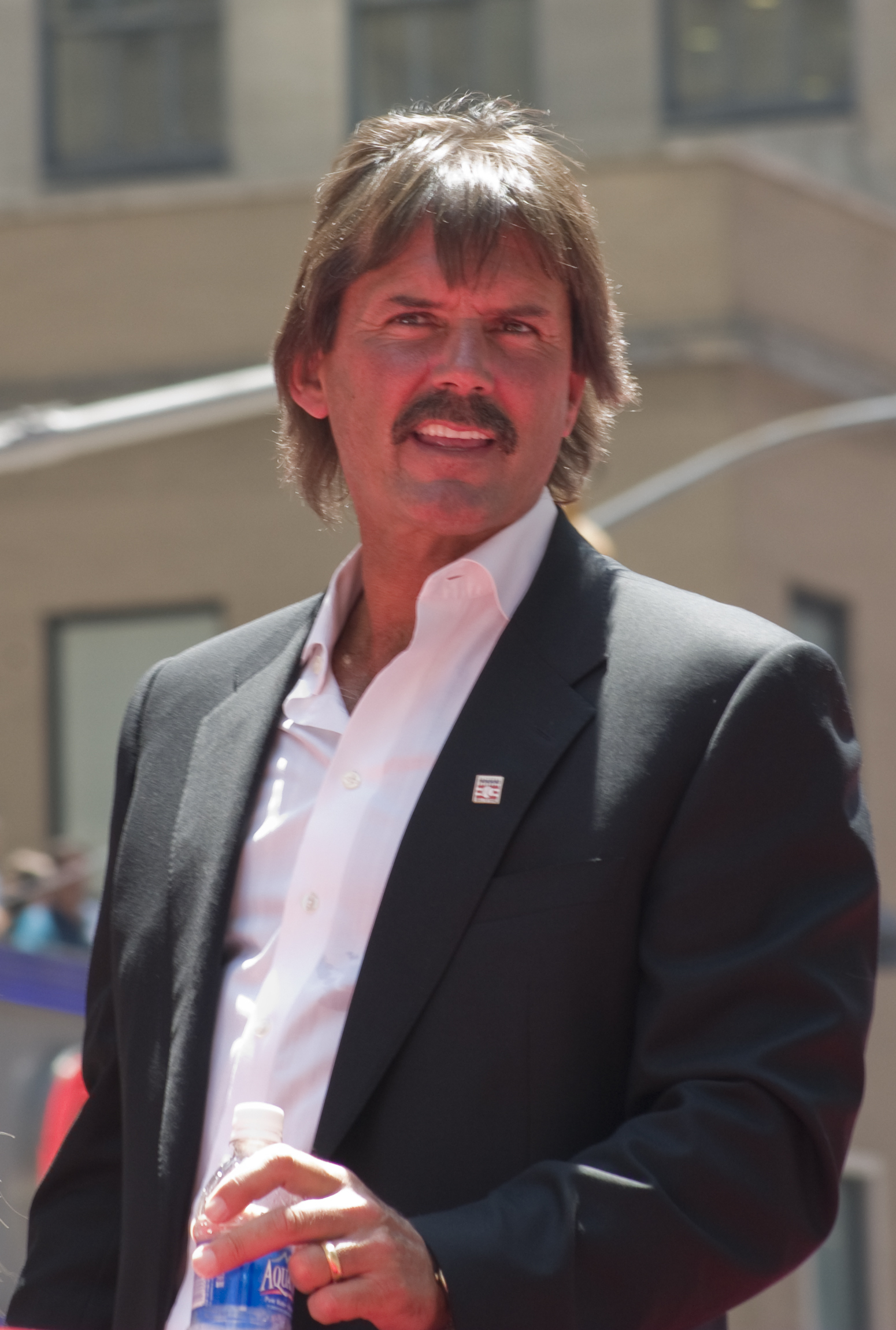
Hall of Famer and committee member Dennis Eckersley

The committee consisted of the following individuals:

- Hall of Famers: Roberto Alomar, Bobby Cox, Andre Dawson, Dennis Eckersley, Pat Gillick, Ozzie Smith, Don Sutton and Frank Thomas
- Executives: Paul Beeston, Bill DeWitt, David Glass, Andy MacPhail and Kevin Towers
- Media and historians: Bill Center, Steve Hirdt, and Tim Kurkjian
- Non-voting committee chair: Jane Forbes Clark (Hall of Fame chairman)

=== 2018 ===
The committee consisted of the following individuals:

- Hall of Famers: George Brett, Rod Carew, Bobby Cox, Dennis Eckersley, John Schuerholz, Don Sutton, Dave Winfield, Robin Yount
- Executives: Sandy Alderson, Paul Beeston, Bob Castellini, David Glass, Bill DeWitt
- Media and historians: Bob Elliott, Steve Hirdt, Jayson Stark
- Non-voting committee chair: Jane Forbes Clark (Hall of Fame chairman)

=== 2019 ===
The committee consisted of the following individuals:

- Hall of Famers: Roberto Alomar, Bert Blyleven, Pat Gillick, Tony La Russa, Greg Maddux, Joe Morgan, John Schuerholz, Ozzie Smith, Joe Torre
- Executives: Al Avila, Paul Beeston, Andy MacPhail, Jerry Reinsdorf
- Media and historians: Steve Hirdt, Tim Kurkjian, Claire Smith
- Non-voting committee chair: Jane Forbes Clark (Hall of Fame chairman)

=== 2020 ===
The cutoff for election to the Hall of Fame remained the standard 75%; as the Modern Baseball Era Committee consisted of 16 members, 12 votes was the minimum for selection.

- Hall of Famers: George Brett, Rod Carew, Dennis Eckersley, Eddie Murray, Ozzie Smith and Robin Yount
- Executives: Sandy Alderson, Dave Dombrowski, David Glass, Walt Jocketty, Doug Melvin and Terry Ryan
- Media and historians: Bill Center, Steve Hirdt, Jack O'Connell and Tracy Ringolsby.
- Non-voting committee chair: Jane Forbes Clark (Hall of Fame chairman)

=== 2021 ===
Due to the COVID-19 pandemic, meetings of the Early Baseball committee and Golden Days committee were postponed from December 2020 to December 2021.

=== 2022 ===
Early Baseball Committee

The committee consisted of the following individuals:

- Hall of Famers: Bert Blyleven, Ferguson Jenkins, John Schuerholtz, Ozzie Smith, Joe Torre
- Executives: William DeWitt Jr., Ken Kendrick, Tony Reagins
- Media and historians: Steve Hirdt, Rick Hummel, John Thorn, Gary Ashwill, Adrian Burgos Jr., Leslie Heaphy, Jim Henneman, Justice B. Hill
- Non-voting committee chair: Bud Selig, Jane Forbes Clark (Hall of Fame chairman)

Golden Days Era Committee

The committee consisted of the following individuals:

- Hall of Famers: Rod Carew, Ferguson Jenkins, Mike Schmidt, John Schuerholtz, Bud Selig, Ozzie Smith, Joe Torre
- Executives: Al Avila, William DeWitt Jr., Ken Kendrick, Kim Ng, Tony Reagins
- Media and historians: Steve Hirdt, Jaime Jarrin, Adrian Burgos Jr., Jack O'Connell
- Non-voting committee chair: Jane Forbes Clark (Hall of Fame chairman)

=== 2023 ===
Contemporary Era Baseball Committee

The committee consisted of the following individuals:

- Hall of Famers: Greg Maddux, Jack Morris, Ryne Sandberg, Lee Smith, Frank Thomas, Alan Trammell
- Executives: Paul Beeston, Theo Epstein, Derrick Hall, (Note: Hall replaced Chipper Jones, who had to withdraw from the committee due to illness) Arte Moreno, Kim Ng, Dave St. Peter, Ken Williams
- Media and historians: Steve Hirdt, La Velle Neal, Susan Slusser

=== 2024 ===
Contemporary Era Baseball Committee

The committee consisted of the following individuals:

- Hall of Famers: Jeff Bagwell, Tom Glavine, Chipper Jones, Ted Simmons, Jim Thome, Joe Torre
- Executives: Bud Selig, Sandy Alderson, William DeWitt Jr., Michael Hill, Ken Kendrick, Andy MacPhail, Phyllis Merhige
- Media and historians: Sean Forman, Jack O'Connell, Jesus Ortiz

=== 2025 ===
Classic Baseball Era Committee

The 16-member committee (of which, 75% or 12 votes were required for election) consisted of the following individuals:

- Hall of Famers: Paul Molitor, Eddie Murray, Tony Pérez, Lee Smith, Ozzie Smith, Joe Torre
- Executives: Sandy Alderson, Terry McGuirk, Dayton Moore, Arte Moreno, Brian Sabean
- Media and historians: Bob Elliott, Leslie Heaphy, Steve Hirdt, Dick Kaegel, Larry Lester

=== 2026 ===
Contemporary Era Baseball Committee

The committee consisted of the following individuals:

- Hall of Famers: Ferguson Jenkins, Jim Kaat, Juan Marichal, Tony Pérez, Ozzie Smith, Alan Trammell, Robin Yount
- Executives: Mark Attanasio, Doug Melvin, Arte Moreno, Kim Ng, Tony Reagins, Terry Ryan
- Media and historians: Steve Hirdt, Tyler Kepner, Jayson Stark

== See also ==
- List of members of the Baseball Hall of Fame
