= 2012 Baseball Hall of Fame balloting =

Elections to the Baseball Hall of Fame

National Baseball

Hall of Fame and Museum
- New inductees: 2
- via BBWAA: 1
- via Golden Era Committee: 1
- Total inductees: 297
- Induction date: July 22, 2012

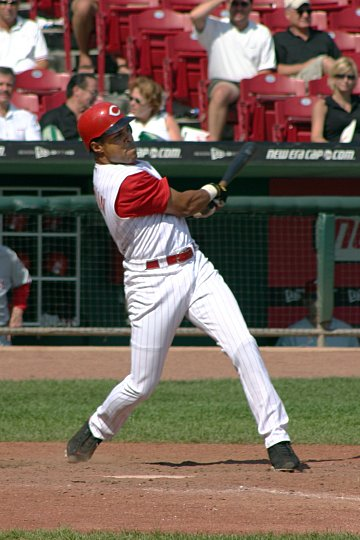
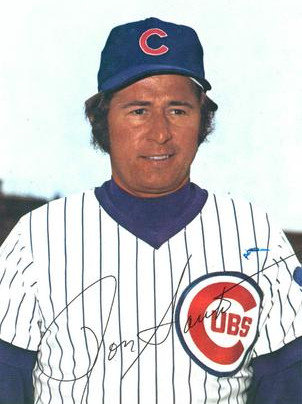
2012 inductees Barry Larkin (left) and Ron Santo

Elections to the Baseball Hall of Fame for 2012 proceeded according to rules most recently revised in July 2010. As in the past, the Baseball Writers' Association of America (BBWAA) voted by mail to select from a ballot of recently retired players, with results announced on January 9, 2012. The Golden Era Committee, the second of three new era committees established by the July 2010 rules change, replacing the Veterans Committee, convened early in December 2011 to select from a Golden Era ballot of retired players and non-playing personnel who made their greatest contributions to the sport between 1947 and 1972, called the "Golden Era" by the Hall of Fame.

The induction class consisted of Ron Santo, elected by the Golden Era Committee, and Barry Larkin, elected by the BBWAA.

The induction ceremonies were held on July 22, 2012, at the Hall of Fame in Cooperstown, New York. On July 21, the Hall presented two awards for media excellence—its own Ford C. Frick Award for broadcasters and the BBWAA's J. G. Taylor Spink Award for writers.

== BBWAA election ==
The BBWAA ballot was announced on November 30, 2011. The BBWAA was authorized to elect players active in 1992 or later, but not after 2006; the ballot included candidates from the 2011 ballot who received at least 5% of the vote but were not elected, along with selected players, chosen by a screening committee, whose last playing appearance was in 2006. All 10-year members of the BBWAA were eligible to vote.

The ballot consisted of the 14 candidates who received at least 5% of the vote in the 2011 election, plus 13 first-time candidates. Voters were instructed to cast votes for up to 10 candidates. Under BBWAA rules, write-in votes were not permitted.

Results of the 2011 election by the BBWAA were announced on January 9, 2012. A total of 573 ballots were cast (including nine ballots which supported no candidates), with 430 votes required for election. A total of 2,921 individual votes were cast, an average of 5.10 per ballot - the lowest rate ever, breaking the record of 5.32 set in 1997. Any candidate who received votes on at least 75% of the ballots would be inducted. Those candidates who received less than 5% of the vote will not appear on future BBWAA ballots, but may eventually be considered by the Veterans Committee.

Candidates who were eligible for the first time are indicated with a dagger (†). The candidate who received at least 75% of the vote and was elected is indicated in bold italics; candidates selected in subsequent elections, if any, will be indicated in italics.

Player	Votes	Percent	Change	Year
**Barry Larkin**	495	86.4	▲24.3%	3rd
Jack Morris	382	66.7	▲13.1%	13th
Jeff Bagwell	321	56.0	▲14.3%	2nd
Lee Smith	290	50.6	▲5.3%	10th
Tim Raines	279	48.7	▲11.2%	5th
Alan Trammell	211	36.8	▲12.5%	11th
Edgar Martínez	209	36.5	▲3.6%	3rd
Fred McGriff	137	23.9	▲6.0%	3rd
Larry Walker	131	22.9	▲2.6%	2nd
Mark McGwire	112	19.5	▼0.3%	6th
Don Mattingly	102	17.8	▲4.2%	12th
Dale Murphy	83	14.5	▲1.9%	14th
Rafael Palmeiro	72	12.6	▲1.6%	2nd
Bernie Williams†	55	9.6	–	1st
Juan González*	23	4.0	▼1.2%	2nd
Vinny Castilla†*	6	1.0	–	1st
Tim Salmon†*	5	0.9	–	1st
Bill Mueller†*	4	0.7	–	1st
Brad Radke†*	2	0.3	–	1st
Javy López†*	1	0.2	–	1st
Eric Young†*	1	0.2	–	1st
Jeromy Burnitz†*	0	0.0	–	1st
Brian Jordan†*	0	0.0	–	1st
Terry Mulholland†*	0	0.0	–	1st
Phil Nevin†*	0	0.0	–	1st
Rubén Sierra†*	0	0.0	–	1st
Tony Womack†*	0	0.0	–	1st

Key
	Elected to the Hall of Fame on this ballot (named in **bold italics**).
	Elected subsequently, as of 2026 (named in plain italics).
	Renominated for the 2013 BBWAA election by adequate performance on this ballot and has not been elected, as of 2026.
	Eliminated from annual BBWAA consideration by poor performance or expiration on this ballot and has not been elected, as of 2026.
†	First time on the BBWAA ballot.
*	Eliminated from annual BBWAA consideration by poor performance or expiration on this ballot.

The newly eligible candidates included 20 All-Stars, 9 of whom were not on the ballot, representing a total of 33 All-Star selections. Bernie Williams was the only candidate selected to at least five All-Star Games; he was selected exactly five times. The new field of candidates featured a pair of four-time Gold-Glove winners (Williams in center, Mike Matheny at catcher) and a pair of Rookie-of-the-Year Award winners (Todd Hollandsworth and Tim Salmon), neither of whom was ever selected for an All-Star Game.

The biggest issue surrounding this election, as in elections in the recent past, was the controversy over use of performance-enhancing drugs (PEDs). During the 2012 voting, debate about the influence of steroids on the game in the 1990s was widely believed to have affected the vote totals for several power hitters on the ballot, including McGwire, Bagwell, Walker, Palmeiro, and González, regardless of whether they had ever tested positive for steroid use or had even been accused of involvement with steroids. Of these players:

- McGwire, long dogged by allegations of steroid use, admitted in January 2010 to having used them for much of his career.
- Bagwell never tested positive, but was the subject of PED rumors during his career.
- Walker was never linked to PED usage, much less testing positive. His candidacy is more affected by his extreme home/away statistical splits, attributed by many to his long tenure with the Colorado Rockies in Coors Field, most of which came before the team's installation of a humidor to store game balls which caused a noticeable decline in the number of home runs hit.
- Palmeiro tested positive for the steroid stanozolol in 2005, a few months after testifying in front of a U.S. House panel and vehemently denying that he had ever used steroids. To this day, he claims that his positive test was due to a tainted B12 injection.
- González was named by Jose Canseco in his 2005 tell-all book Juiced as one of several players whom he injected with steroids, although González has denied this report. González was also named in the Mitchell Report regarding a 2001 incident in which a bag belonging to either him or his personal trainer was found to contain drugs that were legal in MLB at the time but are now banned. It remains disputed whether that bag contained steroids.

The field of potential new candidates was considered to be weaker than it was in 2011. The most prominent new candidates included Bernie Williams, Rubén Sierra, Vinny Castilla, Eric Young, Tim Salmon, and Brad Radke. Williams was the only new candidate who received enough votes to remain on the ballot in 2013.

Players who were eligible for the first time who were not included on the ballot were: Manny Alexander, Edgardo Alfonzo, Pedro Astacio, David Bell, Giovanni Carrara, Mike DeJean, Einar Díaz, Joey Eischen, Scott Erickson, Carl Everett, Jeff Fassero, Alex Gonzalez, Danny Graves, Todd Greene, Jason Grimsley, Chris Hammond, Rick Helling, Dustin Hermanson, Jose Hernandez, Todd Hollandsworth, Damian Jackson, Kevin Jarvis, Steve Karsay, Tim Laker, Matt Lawton, Eli Marrero, Mike Matheny, Quinton McCracken, Dan Miceli, Jeff Nelson, Eduardo Pérez, Todd Pratt, Curtis Pride, Joe Randa, Mike Remlinger, Félix Rodríguez, Michael Tucker, José Vizcaíno, Chris Widger, Tim Worrell and Esteban Yan. José Lima last played in 2006, but was eligible for consideration in 2011 due to his death on May 23, 2010.

ESPN.com columnist Jim Caple noted several days before the announcement of the 2012 results that the PED issue and the BBWAA's limit of 10 votes per ballot was likely to result in a major backlog in upcoming elections:

Due to the steroid issue and a general lack of consensus, the following players will probably be on the ballot in three years: Barry Bonds, Roger Clemens, Pedro Martínez, Randy Johnson, Sammy Sosa, Jeff Bagwell, John Smoltz, Edgar Martínez, Mark McGwire, Mike Mussina, Jeff Kent, Larry Walker, Alan Trammell, Fred McGriff, Rafael Palmeiro, Lee Smith, Tim Raines, Gary Sheffield, Mike Piazza, Curt Schilling and, of course, Bernie [Williams]. That's 21 players who warrant serious consideration. And that's not counting Barry Larkin, who might be [Ed. – and was] elected this year, and also assuming Greg Maddux, Tom Glavine, Craig Biggio and Frank Thomas make it their first years on the ballot. Finding room for Bonds, Clemens, Pedro, Johnson and others means I'll have to dump more good players from my ballot than the Marlins dumped after winning the 1997 World Series.

== Golden Era Committee ==
In keeping with the restructured Hall of Fame voting procedure, the existing BBWAA-appointed Historical Overview Committee identified 10 Golden Era candidates who were judged to have made their greatest contributions between 1947 and 1972. Along with the 1947–1972 era, these rules defined the consideration set:

- Players who played in at least 10 major league seasons, who are not on Major League Baseball's ineligible list (e.g., Pete Rose), and have been retired for 21 or more seasons.
- Managers and umpires with 10 or more years in baseball and retired for at least five years. Candidates who are 65 years or older are eligible six months following retirement.
- Executives retired for at least five years. Active executives 65 years or older are eligible for consideration.

Historical Overview Committee (11 BBWAA members): Dave Van Dyck (Chicago Tribune); Bob Elliott (Toronto Sun); Rick Hummel (St. Louis Post-Dispatch); Steve Hirdt (Elias Sports Bureau); Bill Madden (New York Daily News); Ken Nigro (formerly The Baltimore Sun); Jack O'Connell (BBWAA secretary/treasurer); Glenn Schwarz (formerly San Francisco Chronicle); Claire Smith (ESPN); Tracy Ringolsby (FSN Rocky Mountain); and Mark Whicker (Orange County Register).

The Golden Era Ballot for election by the Golden Era Committee on December 5 was released on November 3, 2011, and the Hall of Fame announced the results on December 5, 2011.

Candidate	Category	Votes	Percent	Ref
Ron Santo	Player	15	93.75%	
Jim Kaat	Player	10	62.5%	
Gil Hodges	Player	9	56.25%	
Minnie Miñoso	Player	9	56.25%	
Tony Oliva	Player	8	50%	
Buzzie Bavasi	Executive	<3		
Ken Boyer	Player	<3		
Charlie Finley	Executive	<3		
Allie Reynolds	Player	<3		
Luis Tiant	Player	<3		

Kaat, Miñoso, Oliva, and Tiant were living when the ballot was announced.

Golden Era Committee (16-member committee appointed by the Hall's board of directors) was announced at the same time as the Golden Era ballot:

- Hall of Famers: Hank Aaron, Al Kaline, Ralph Kiner, Tommy Lasorda, Juan Marichal, Brooks Robinson, Don Sutton, Billy Williams
- Executives: Paul Beeston, Bill DeWitt, Roland Hemond, Gene Michael, Al Rosen
- Media: Dick Kaegel, Jack O'Connell, Dave Van Dyck

The Committee convened at the 2011 winter meetings on December 5, 2011, with the standard 75% or 12 of 16 votes required for election and July 22, 2012, induction.

== J. G. Taylor Spink Award ==
The J. G. Taylor Spink Award has been presented by the BBWAA at the annual summer induction ceremonies since 1962. Through 2010, it was awarded during the main induction ceremony, but is now awarded the previous day at the Hall of Fame Awards Presentation. It recognizes a sportswriter "for meritorious contributions to baseball writing". The recipients are not members of the Hall of Fame but are featured in a permanent exhibit at the National Baseball Museum.

The three nominees for the 2012 award were selected by a three-person BBWAA committee and announced at the BBWAA's annual All-Star Game meeting on July 12, 2011, at Chase Field in Phoenix. They were Bob Elliott of the Toronto Sun; Paul Hagen, then of the Philadelphia Daily News; and Russell Schneider, formerly of The Plain Dealer of Cleveland. This was the fourth consecutive year Elliott had been nominated.

Under BBWAA rules, the winner was to be announced either during the 2011 World Series or at the 2011 winter meetings. The winner of the 2012 J. G. Taylor Spink Award, announced at the winter meetings, was Bob Elliott, who received 205 votes from the 455 ballots cast. Hagen received 169 votes and Schneider 61. Elliott became the first Canadian recipient of the award.

This is Elliott's second award for writing excellence from a major baseball hall of fame. He was the 2010 recipient of the Jack Graney Award, given irregularly for excellence in either writing or broadcasting, from the Canadian Baseball Hall of Fame.

== Ford C. Frick Award ==
The Ford C. Frick Award, honoring excellence in baseball broadcasting, has been presented at the induction ceremonies since 1978. Through 2010, it had been presented at the main induction ceremony, but is now presented at the Awards Presentation. Recipients are not members of the Hall of Fame but are permanently recognized in an exhibit at the museum. To be eligible, an active or retired broadcaster must have a minimum of 10 years of continuous major league broadcast service with a ball club, a network, or a combination of the two. The honor is based on four criteria: longevity; continuity with a club; honors, including national assignments such as the World Series and All-Star Games; and popularity with fans. The recipient was announced during the 2011 winter meetings, following a vote by the same committee that selected seven of the finalists (below).

Ten finalists were announced on October 5, 2011. In accord with guidelines established in 2003, seven were chosen by a committee composed of the living recipients along with broadcasting historians and columnists. Three were selected from a list of candidates by fan voting in September 2011 at the Hall's Facebook page.

- Committee selections:
  - Skip Caray
  - René Cárdenas
  - Ken Coleman
  - Bill King
  - Tim McCarver
  - Graham McNamee
  - Eric Nadel
- Fan selections:
  - Tom Cheek
  - Jacques Doucet
  - Mike Shannon

Five candidates were living when the ballot was announced—the active McCarver, Nadel, and Shannon; and the retired Cárdenas and Doucet.

On December 7, Tim McCarver, the lead analyst for Major League Baseball on Fox since 1996, was named as the recipient. A catcher in MLB for 22 years, mostly with the St. Louis Cardinals and Philadelphia Phillies, he joined the Phillies' local television broadcast team almost immediately after his first retirement as a player in 1979 (he would briefly return as a player late in the 1980 season). From there, he went on to the New York Mets' local broadcast team before moving to national network television. McCarver has been an analyst for all four of the major U.S. over-the-air broadcast networks during his career.

McCarver became the second Frick Award winner, after 2009 recipient Tony Kubek, whose broadcasting career was exclusively in television.
