= 2021 Baseball Hall of Fame balloting =

Elections to the Baseball Hall of Fame

National Baseball

Hall of Fame and Museum
- New inductees: 0
- Total inductees: 333
- Induction date: September 8, 2021

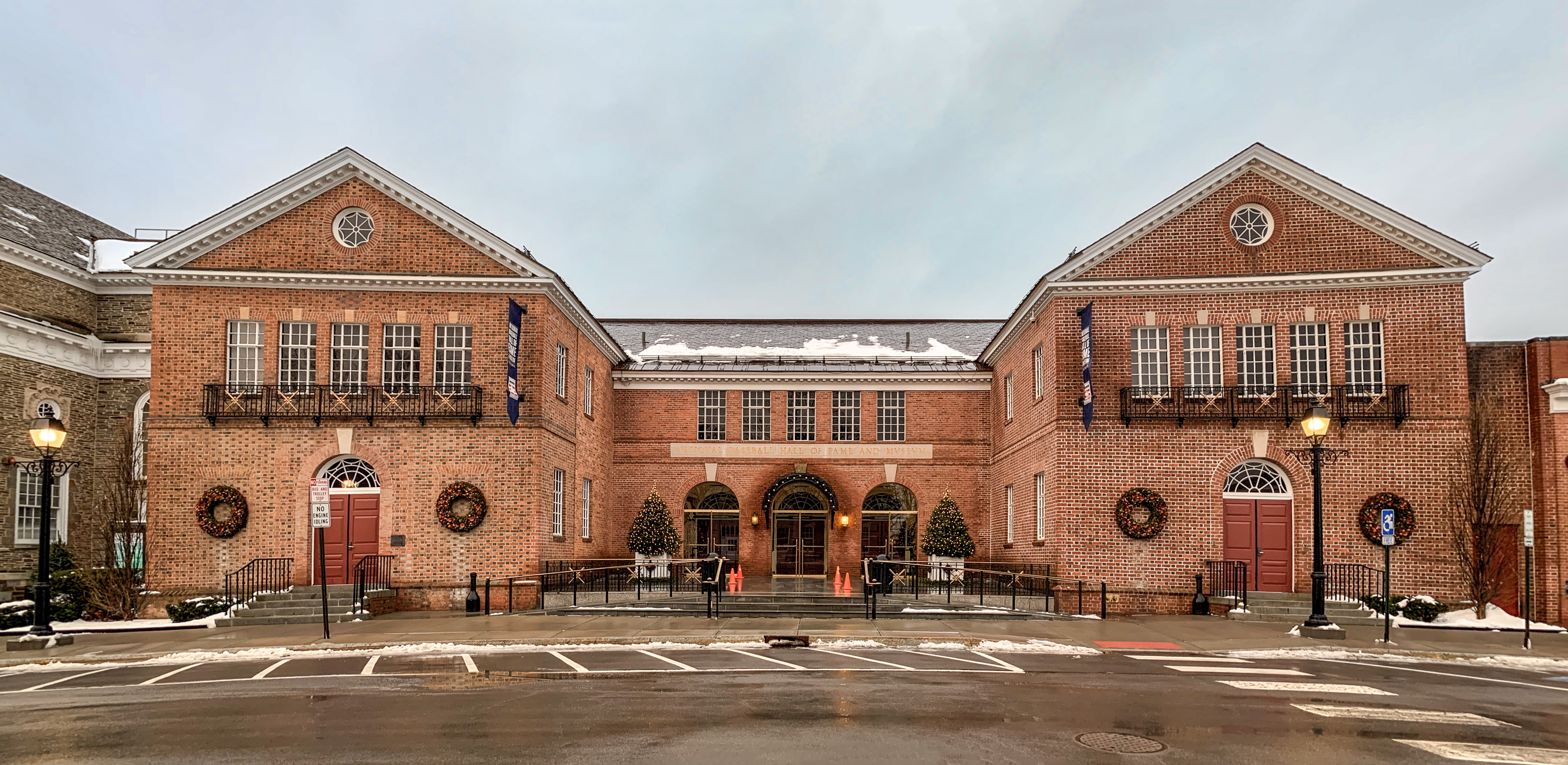
The Hall of Fame in Cooperstown, New York, in 2020

Elections to the National Baseball Hall of Fame for 2021 proceeded according to rules most recently amended in 2016. As in the past, the Baseball Writers' Association of America (BBWAA) voted by mail to select from a ballot of recently retired players. The results were announced on January 26, 2021, with no players receiving enough votes to be inducted.

Due to the COVID-19 pandemic, meetings of the Early Baseball committee and Golden Days committee—two of a group of four bodies generally referred to as the Veterans Committee—which were scheduled to consider players from the 1871–1949 and 1950–1969 eras, respectively, were postponed from December 2020 to December 2021.

This was the first time since 2013 that the BBWAA did not elect a player to the Hall of Fame, and the first time since 1960 that no one was selected for induction to the Hall, either via the BBWAA or one of the Veterans Committees.

Also due to the COVID-19 pandemic, four people elected to the Hall in 2020 balloting—Derek Jeter, Larry Walker, Ted Simmons, and Marvin Miller—who were originally scheduled to be inducted on July 26, 2020, were inducted during 2021 ceremonies. The 2021 formal induction ceremonies in Cooperstown, New York, were originally planned to be held indoors and without spectators on July 25, 2021, then were moved to September 8, 2021.

== BBWAA election ==
The list of players appearing on the ballot was released on November 16, 2020. There were 14 players carried over from the prior year's ballot, who garnered at least 5% of the vote and were still eligible for election, and 11 players who appeared on the ballot for the first time, whose last major league appearance was in 2015 and were chosen by a screening committee. A player must receive at least 75% of the votes cast to be elected. A total of 2,365 votes were cast for individual players, an average of 5.9 votes per ballot

Hall of Fame voting results for class of 2021
Player	Votes	Percent	Change	Year
Curt Schilling	285	71.1%	▲1.1%	9th
Barry Bonds	248	61.8%	▲1.1%	9th
Roger Clemens	247	61.6%	▲0.6%	9th
Scott Rolen	212	52.9%	▲17.6%	4th
Omar Vizquel	197	49.1%	▼3.5%	4th
Billy Wagner	186	46.4%	▲14.7%	6th
Todd Helton	180	44.9%	▲15.7%	3rd
Gary Sheffield	163	40.6%	▲10.1%	7th
Andruw Jones	136	33.9%	▲14.5%	4th
Jeff Kent	130	32.4%	▲4.9%	8th
Manny Ramirez	113	28.2%	0.0%	5th
Sammy Sosa	68	17.0%	▲3.1%	9th
Andy Pettitte	55	13.7%	▲2.4%	3rd
Mark Buehrle†	44	11.0%	–	1st
Torii Hunter†	38	9.5%	–	1st
Bobby Abreu	35	8.7%	▲3.2%	2nd
Tim Hudson†	21	5.2%	–	1st
Aramis Ramírez†*	4	1.0%	–	1st
LaTroy Hawkins†*	2	0.5%	–	1st
Barry Zito†*	1	0.2%	–	1st
A. J. Burnett†*	0	0%	–	1st
Michael Cuddyer†*	0	0%	–	1st
Dan Haren†*	0	0%	–	1st
Nick Swisher†*	0	0%	–	1st
Shane Victorino†*	0	0%	–	1st

Key
	Elected to the Hall of Fame on this ballot (named in **bold italics**).
	Elected subsequently, as of 2026 (named in plain italics).
	Renominated for the 2022 BBWAA election by adequate performance on this ballot and has not subsequently been eliminated.
	Eliminated from annual BBWAA consideration by poor performance or expiration on subsequent ballots.
	Eliminated from annual BBWAA consideration by poor performance or expiration on this ballot.
†	First time on the BBWAA ballot.
*	Eliminated from annual BBWAA consideration by poor performance on this ballot (not expiration).

Players who met first-year eligibility requirements but were not selected by the screening committee for inclusion on the ballot included: Jeremy Affeldt, Scott Baker, Jeff Baker, Grant Balfour, Clint Barmes, Joe Beimel, Rafael Betancourt, Willie Bloomquist, Alberto Callaspo, Bruce Chen, Randy Choate, Kevin Correia, Neal Cotts, David DeJesus, Chris Denorfia, Jeff Francis, Jason Frasor, Jonny Gomes, Kevin Gregg, Aaron Harang, Corey Hart, Reed Johnson, Dan Johnson, Gerald Laird, Adam LaRoche, Jason Marquis, David Murphy, Wil Nieves, Alex Rios, Wandy Rodriguez, Cody Ross, Skip Schumaker, Grady Sizemore, Rafael Soriano, Tim Stauffer, Dan Uggla, C. J. Wilson, Randy Wolf and Delmon Young.

== J. G. Taylor Spink Award ==
The J. G. Taylor Spink Award has been awarded annually since 1962; it is named after J. G. Taylor Spink, publisher of The Sporting News from 1914 until his death in 1962, and first recipient of the award. It recognizes "meritorious contributions to the field of baseball writing". Past honorees include Ring Lardner, Grantland Rice, Damon Runyon, and Shirley Povich. The results of voting for the 2021 award were announced on December 8, 2020:

- Dick Kaegel, The Sporting News, St. Louis Post-Dispatch, The Kansas City Star and MLB.com — 183 votes
- Marty Noble, Newsday and MLB.com—115 votes
- Allan Simpson, Baseball America — 73 votes

In February 2021, the award was renamed as the BBWAA Career Excellence Award, after the BBWAA voted to remove Spink's name "due to Spink’s troubled history in supporting segregated baseball."

== Ford C. Frick Award ==
The Ford C. Frick Award has been presented annually to a preeminent baseball broadcaster since 1978. According to the Hall, the criteria adopted in July 2016 are "Commitment to excellence, quality of broadcasting abilities, reverence within the game, popularity with fans, and recognition by peers." A new election cycle was established, rotating annually between Current Major League Markets (team-specific announcers) with the 2017 Frick Award; National Voices (broadcasters whose contributions were realized on a national level) with the 2018 Frick Award; and Broadcasting Beginnings (early team voices and pioneers of baseball broadcasting) with the 2019 Frick Award. Since this cycle repeats every three years, all finalists for the 2021 award were National Voices.

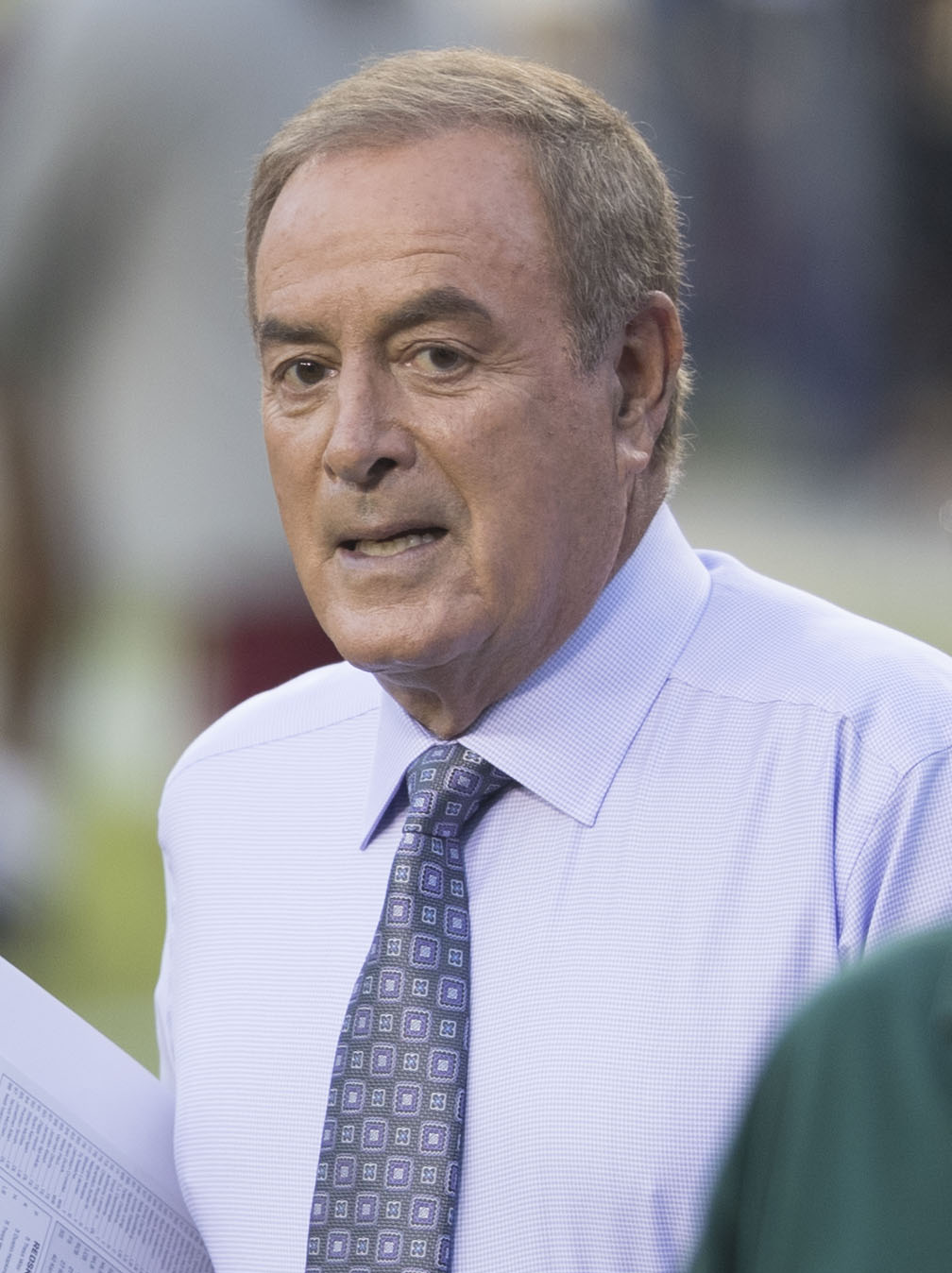
Al Michaels

On December 9, 2020, sportscaster Al Michaels was named the 2021 recipient of the Ford C. Frick Award. Before working nationally, Michaels was an announcer for the Cincinnati Reds and San Francisco Giants in the 1970s. Notable baseball events he called include the 1986 American League Championship Series and 1989 World Series. The eight finalists for the award were:

- Buddy Blattner (1920–2009)
- Joe Buck (born 1969)
- Dave Campbell (born 1942)
- Dizzy Dean (1910–1974)
- Don Drysdale (1936–1993)
- Ernesto Jerez (born 1967)
- Al Michaels (born 1944)
- Dan Shulman (born 1967)
