= J. Roy Stockton =

American sportswriter

- Born: December 16, 1892; St. Louis, Missouri, U.S.
- Died: August 24, 1972 (aged 79); St. Petersburg, Florida, U.S.
- Occupation: Sportswriter
- Employer: St. Louis Post-Dispatch
- Known for: Baseball reporting
- Spouses: Charlotte Burton Stockton (d. 1953); Josephine Knox Rassieur (m. 1954)
- Children: 1
- Awards: J. G. Taylor Spink Award (1972)

James Roy Stockton (December 16, 1892 – August 24, 1972) was an American sports writer who covered the St. Louis Cardinals from 1915 to 1958.

== Biography ==
Stockton was born in St. Louis in 1892. He was hired by the St. Louis Post-Dispatch in 1918, working there for the majority of his career. Beginning in the early 1930s, as a member of Christy Walsh's ghostwriting syndicate, Stockton wrote many of the articles published under Dizzy Dean's byline. He also covered the St. Louis Terriers of the Federal League in 1915, served as president of the Florida State League, and was a member of the Veterans Committee of the National Baseball Hall of Fame and Museum.

Stockton died in August 1972 in St. Petersburg, Florida. Stockton first wife had died in 1953; he remarried, and was survived by his second wife and a son from the first marriage.

In late 1972, Stockton was awarded the J. G. Taylor Spink Award by the Baseball Writers' Association of America (BBWAA), and was honored in ceremonies at the National Baseball Hall of Fame in Cooperstown, New York, in August 1973.
