= 2013 Baseball Hall of Fame balloting =

Elections to the Baseball Hall of Fame

National Baseball

Hall of Fame and Museum
- New inductees: 3
- via Pre-Integration Era Committee: 3
- Total inductees: 300
- Induction date: July 28, 2013

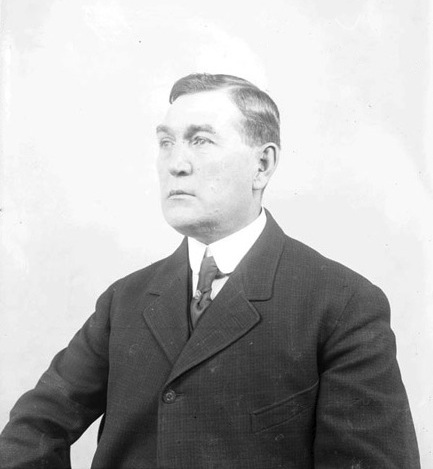
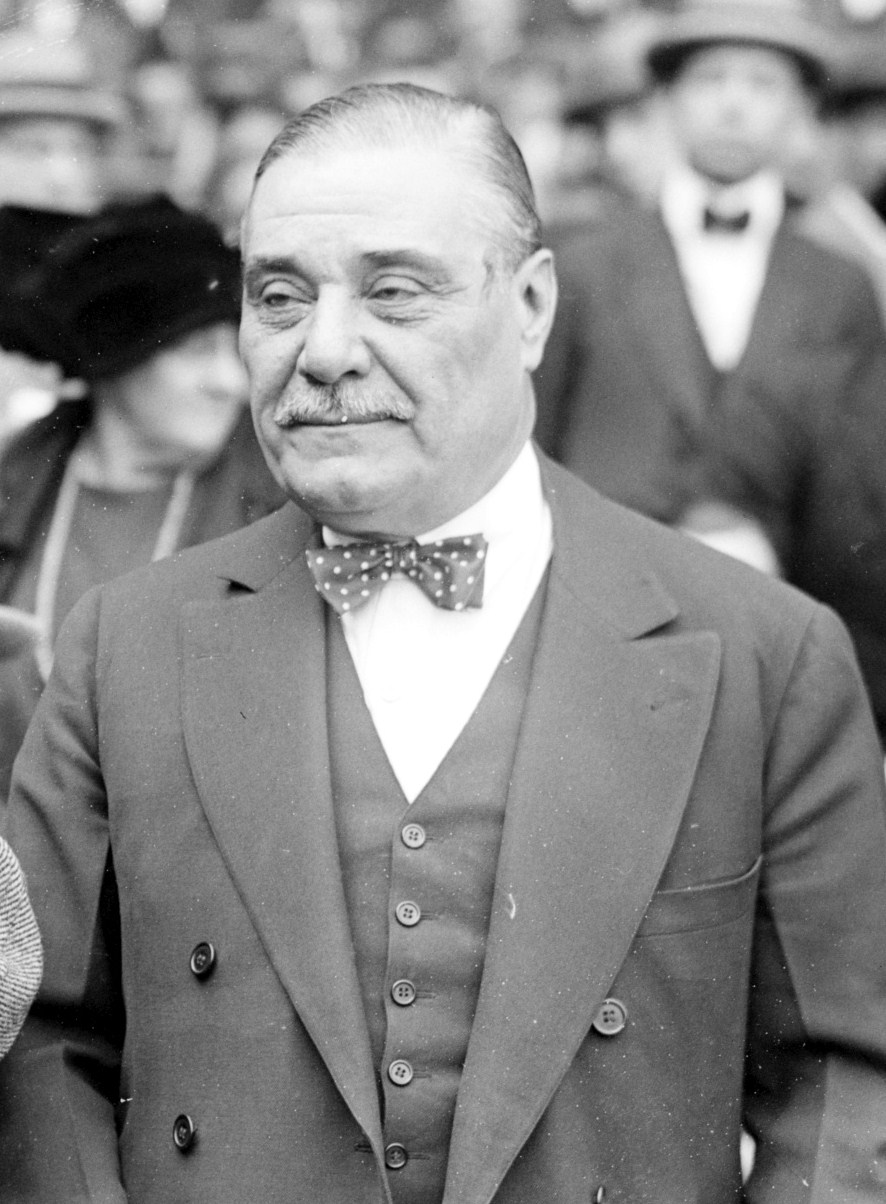
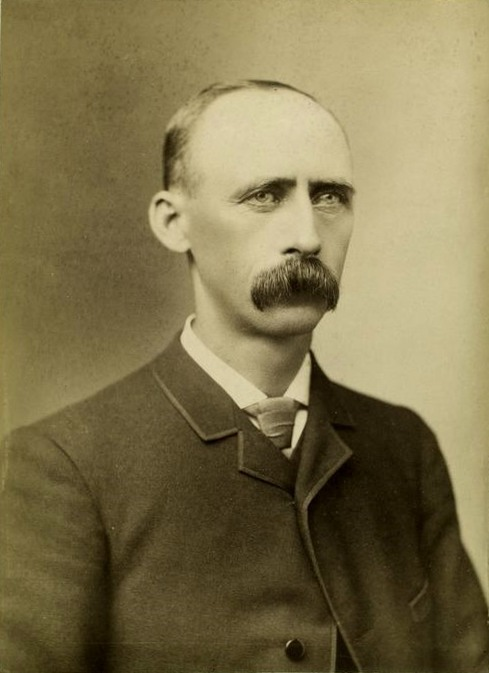
2013 inductees (L-R): Hank O'Day, Jacob Ruppert, and Deacon White

Elections to the Baseball Hall of Fame for 2013 took place according to rules most recently revised in July 2010. As in the past, the Baseball Writers' Association of America (BBWAA) voted by mail to select from a ballot of recently retired players, with results announced on January 9, 2013. The Pre-Integration Era Committee, the last of three new voting committees established during the July 2010 rules change to replace the more broadly defined Veterans Committee, convened early in December 2012 to select from a ballot of players and non-playing personnel who made their greatest contributions to the sport prior to 1947, called the "Pre-Integration Era" by the Hall of Fame.

For the first time since 1996, and just the third time since 1960, the BBWAA election resulted in no selections. As the ballot featured numerous strong candidates, the result was widely viewed as a reflection of the deep controversy over players who were primarily active during a period when the sport was riddled with rumored use of performance-enhancing drugs (PEDs), and candidates appeared to have suffered in the voting regardless of whether they had been closely tied to any such rumors. The controversy's first major impact on the Hall of Fame ballot was seen in 2007, and the arrival in future years of additional candidates with either alleged or actual links to PED use suggested that the issue would be significant in Hall voting for at least several more years.

For the first time since 1965, there were no living inductees. The induction class of 2013 consisted of the three deceased individuals elected by the new Pre-Integration Era Committee: player Deacon White, umpire Hank O'Day, and executive Jacob Ruppert, all of whom died in the 1930s. As was the case following the 1965 election–which also resulted only in the induction of a member deceased for over 60 years, and led to the resumption of annual BBWAA elections–the voting results led to calls for revision of the voting rules.

The induction ceremonies were held on July 28, 2013, at the Hall of Fame in Cooperstown, New York. On July 27, the Hall of Fame presented two annual awards for media excellence—its own Ford C. Frick Award for broadcasters and the BBWAA's J. G. Taylor Spink Award for writers, and also honored sports medicine pioneer Dr. Frank Jobe and filmmaker Thomas Tull, producer of the 2013 film 42.

== BBWAA election ==
The BBWAA ballot was announced on November 28, 2012. The BBWAA was authorized to elect players active in 1993 or later, but not after 2007; the ballot included candidates from the 2012 ballot who received at least 5% of the vote but were not elected, along with selected players, chosen by a screening committee, whose last appearance was in 2007. All 10-year members of the BBWAA were eligible to vote, and had until December 31, 2012, to return their ballots to the Hall.

There were 37 candidates on the ballot, 13 who last played from 1993 to 2006 and received at least 5% support in the 2012 election plus 24 first-time candidates (†). Voters were instructed to support as many as ten candidates; write-in votes were not permitted.

Results of the 2013 election by the BBWAA were announced on January 9, live on the MLB Network and streamed on the Hall's website. A total of 569 ballots were cast, with 427 votes required for election. A total of 3,756 individual votes were cast, an average of 6.6 per ballot- the highest per-ballot average since 2003 (also 6.6), and the first average of over six per ballot since 2007 (6.58). The 24 first-time candidates (†) last played during the 2007 major league season. Eighteen received less than 5% support (*) and were thus eliminated from BBWAA consideration; six newcomers scored 5% support or more, the largest number since 1994.

No player received the 75% support needed for election, the first such shutout since 1996 and only the eighth in history.

Dale Murphy was on the ballot for the 15th and final time.

Player	Votes	Percent	Change	Year
Craig Biggio†	388	68.2%	–	1st
Jack Morris	385	67.7%	▲1.1%	14th
Jeff Bagwell	339	59.6%	▲3.6%	3rd
Mike Piazza†	329	57.8%	–	1st
Tim Raines	297	52.2%	▲4.5%	6th
Lee Smith	272	47.8%	▼2.8%	11th
Curt Schilling†	221	38.8%	–	1st
Roger Clemens†	214	37.6%	–	1st
Barry Bonds†	206	36.2%	–	1st
Edgar Martínez	204	35.9%	▼0.6%	4th
Alan Trammell	191	33.6%	▼3.2%	12th
Larry Walker	123	21.6%	▼1.3%	3rd
Fred McGriff	118	20.7%	▼3.2%	4th
Dale Murphy	106	18.6%	▲4.1%	15th
Mark McGwire	96	16.9%	▼2.6%	7th
Don Mattingly	75	13.2%	▼4.6%	13th
Sammy Sosa†	71	12.5%	–	1st
Rafael Palmeiro	50	8.8%	▼3.8%	3rd
Bernie Williams*	19	3.3%	▼6.3%	2nd
Kenny Lofton†*	18	3.2%	–	1st
Sandy Alomar Jr.†*	16	2.8%	–	1st
Julio Franco†*	6	1.1%	–	1st
David Wells†*	5	0.9%	–	1st
Steve Finley†*	4	0.7%	–	1st
Shawn Green†*	2	0.4%	–	1st
Aaron Sele†*	1	0.2%	–	1st
Jeff Cirillo†*	0	0.0%	–	1st
Royce Clayton†*	0	0.0%	–	1st
Jeff Conine†*	0	0.0%	–	1st
Roberto Hernández†*	0	0.0%	–	1st
Ryan Klesko†*	0	0.0%	–	1st
José Mesa†*	0	0.0%	–	1st
Reggie Sanders†*	0	0.0%	–	1st
Mike Stanton†*	0	0.0%	–	1st
Todd Walker†*	0	0.0%	–	1st
Rondell White†*	0	0.0%	–	1st
Woody Williams†*	0	0.0%	–	1st

Key
	Elected to the Hall of Fame on this ballot (named in **bold italics**).
	Elected subsequently, as of 2026 (named in plain italics).
	Renominated for the 2014 BBWAA election by adequate performance on this ballot and has not been elected, as of 2026.
	Eliminated from annual BBWAA consideration by poor performance or expiration on this ballot and has not been elected, as of 2026.
†	First time on the BBWAA ballot.
*	Eliminated from annual BBWAA consideration by poor performance or expiration on this ballot.

The newly eligible candidates included 29 All-Stars, seven of whom were not on the ballot, representing a total of 104 All-Star selections, a record, and over three times the number of 2012's class (33 All-Star selections among newly eligible candidates); until this year, only the class of 2007 had ever breached 100 selections (103). Among the candidates were 14-time All-Star, 7-time MVP and holder of both the single-season (73) and career (762) home run records Barry Bonds; 12-time All-Star Mike Piazza; 11-time All-Star and 7-time Cy Young Award winner Roger Clemens; 7-time All-Stars Craig Biggio and Sammy Sosa; and 6-time All-Stars Sandy Alomar Jr., Kenny Lofton and Curt Schilling. The field included two Rookies of the Year, both catchers (Alomar and Piazza), three MVPs (in addition to Bonds' seven, Clemens and Sosa each won one apiece) and a Cy Young Award winner (Clemens). Bonds and Clemens, with seven apiece, hold the records for MVPs and Cy Young Awards won, respectively. The field included two candidates with at least five Gold Glove Awards: Bonds (seven in left field) and Steve Finley (five in center). It also included five candidates with at least five Silver Slugger Awards: Bonds (twelve in left field), Piazza (ten at catcher), Sosa (six in right field), Biggio (five total- four at second base and one at catcher) and Julio Franco (five total- four at second base and one at DH). Bonds holds the record for Silver Sluggers in the outfield, while Piazza holds the record at catcher.

As in recent years, the controversy over use of performance-enhancing drugs (PEDs) dominated the elections. ESPN.com columnist Jim Caple noted in the days before the announcement of the 2012 results that the PED issue, combined with the BBWAA's limit of 10 votes per ballot, was likely to result in a major backlog in upcoming elections:

Due to the steroid issue and a general lack of consensus, the following players will probably be on the ballot in three years: Barry Bonds, Roger Clemens, Pedro Martínez, Randy Johnson, Sammy Sosa, Jeff Bagwell, John Smoltz, Edgar Martínez, Mark McGwire, Mike Mussina, Jeff Kent, Larry Walker, Alan Trammell, Fred McGriff, Rafael Palmeiro, Lee Smith, Tim Raines, Gary Sheffield, Mike Piazza, Curt Schilling and, of course, Bernie [Williams]. That's 21 players who warrant serious consideration. And that's not counting Barry Larkin, who might be [Ed. – and was] elected this year, and also assuming Greg Maddux, Tom Glavine, Craig Biggio and Frank Thomas make it their first years on the ballot. Finding room for Bonds, Clemens, Pedro, Johnson and others means I'll have to dump more good players from my ballot than the Marlins dumped after winning the 1997 World Series.

Another ESPN.com writer, Tim Kurkjian, added that the 2013 ballot would include several new candidates who either tested positive or were strongly linked to PEDs:

The next Hall of Fame ballot will include Barry Bonds, Roger Clemens, Sammy Sosa, Mike Piazza, Curt Schilling, Craig Biggio, and Kenny Lofton. They all have Hall of Fame numbers, some stronger than others, but Bonds, Clemens, Sosa and Piazza certainly are not going to be elected on the first ballot — and in the case of Bonds, Clemens and Sosa, they might not make it to Cooperstown for many, many years to come.

Several other players returning from the 2012 ballot with otherwise strong Hall credentials have been linked to PEDs, among them Mark McGwire (who admitted to long-term steroid use in 2010), Jeff Bagwell (who never tested positive, but was the subject of PED rumors during his career), and Rafael Palmeiro (who tested positive for stanozolol shortly after publicly denying that he had ever used steroids).

Players who were eligible for the first time who were not included on the ballot were: Antonio Alfonseca, Tony Batista, Mark Bellhorn, Hector Carrasco, Alberto Castillo, Rhéal Cormier, Juan Encarnación, Robert Fick, Steve Kline, Ricky Ledée, Mike Lieberthal, John Mabry, Tom Martin, Damian Miller, Doug Mirabelli, Mike Myers, Orlando Palmeiro, Neifi Pérez, Desi Relaford, Paul Shuey, Scott Spiezio, Kelly Stinnett, John Thomson, José Valentín, John Wasdin, Rick White, Bob Wickman, Preston Wilson, Jay Witasick, and Jaret Wright.

== Pre-Integration Committee ==
In keeping with the new voting procedure by eras, the BBWAA-appointed Historical Overview Committee, made up of 11 BBWAA members, identified ten Pre-Integration candidates who were judged to have made their greatest contributions prior to 1947. Along with the era, these rules defined the consideration set:

- Players who played in at least 10 major league seasons, who are not on Major League Baseball's ineligible list (e.g., Shoeless Joe Jackson), and have been retired for 21 or more seasons.
- Managers and umpires with 10 or more years in baseball and retired for at least five years. Candidates who are 65 years or older are eligible six years following retirement.
- Executives retired for at least five years. Active executives 65 years or older are eligible for consideration.

However, due to the passage of time, the only listed criteria that materially restricted the field from which the candidates were selected were years of service and presence on baseball's ineligible list.

The eleven BBWAA-appointed Historical Overview Committee members were Dave Van Dyck (Chicago Tribune); Bob Elliott (Toronto Sun); Rick Hummel (St. Louis Post-Dispatch); Steve Hirdt (Elias Sports Bureau); Bill Madden (New York Daily News); Ken Nigro (formerly The Baltimore Sun); Jack O'Connell (BBWAA secretary/treasurer); Tracy Ringolsby (Root Sports Rocky Mountain/MLB.com); Glenn Schwarz (formerly San Francisco Chronicle); Claire Smith (ESPN); and Mark Whicker (Orange County Register).

The Pre-Integration ballot for election by the Pre-Integration Committee was released on November 1, 2012, and the Hall of Fame announced the results on December 3.

Candidate	Category	Votes	Percent	Ref
Hank O'Day	Umpire	15	93.75%	
Jacob Ruppert	Executive	15	93.75%	
Deacon White	Player	14	87.5%	
Bill Dahlen	Player	10	62.5%	
Samuel Breadon	Executive	<3		
Wes Ferrell	Player	<3		
Marty Marion	Player	<3		
Tony Mullane	Player	<3		
Al Reach	Executive	<3		
Bucky Walters	Player	<3		

The Pre-Integration Committee's 16-member voting electorate, appointed by the Hall of Fame's Board of Directors, was announced at the same time as the ballot of 10 candidates:

- Hall of Famers: Bert Blyleven, Pat Gillick, Phil Niekro, Don Sutton
- Executives: Bill DeWitt, Roland Hemond, Gary Hughes, Bob Watson
- Media and historians: Jim Henneman, Steve Hirdt, Peter Morris, Phil Pepe, Tom Simon, Claire Smith, T.R. Sullivan, Mark Whicker

The Pre-Integration Committee which elected three candidates to the Hall of Fame at the 2012 winter meetings in Nashville on December 2–3, with 75% or 12 of 16 votes required for election, convened at the July 28, 2013 induction. Ruppert, O'Day and White were elected. Dahlen received 10 of 16 votes, the highest total of anyone not elected; no one else received more than three votes.

== J. G. Taylor Spink Award ==
The J. G. Taylor Spink Award has been presented by the BBWAA at the annual summer induction ceremonies since 1962. Through 2010, it was awarded during the main induction ceremony, but is now given the previous day at the Hall of Fame Awards Presentation. It recognizes a sportswriter "for meritorious contributions to baseball writing". The recipients are not members of the Hall of Fame but are featured in a permanent exhibit at the National Baseball Museum.

The three nominees for the 2013 award were selected by a BBWAA committee and announced on July 10, 2012, at the BBWAA's annual All-Star Game meeting. They were Paul Hagen of MLB.com; Jim Hawkins, formerly of the Detroit Free Press; and Russell Schneider, formerly of The Plain Dealer of Cleveland. It was the second consecutive nomination for both Hagen and Schneider.

Following the announcement of the nominees, the entire BBWAA membership voted in fall 2012 to determine the recipient. Under BBWAA rules, the winner was to be announced either during the 2012 World Series or at the 2012 winter meetings; in keeping with the practice of recent years, the announcement was made at the winter meetings.

On December 4, Hagen was announced as the recipient, having received 269 of the 421 possible votes (including five blank ballots). Hawkins received 87 votes and Schneider 60. Hagen began his career in 1974 with the San Bernardino Sun, covering the Los Angeles Dodgers. He moved in 1977 to Dallas–Fort Worth, covering the Texas Rangers first for the Dallas Times Herald and later the Fort Worth Star-Telegram. From there, he moved to Philadelphia in 1987, covering the Phillies for the Philadelphia Daily News before becoming that paper's national baseball columnist in 2002. After a 25-year career at the Daily News, he joined MLB.com in 2012.

== Ford C. Frick Award ==
The Ford C. Frick Award, honoring excellence in baseball broadcasting, has been presented at the induction ceremonies since 1978. Through 2010, it had been presented at the main induction ceremony, but is now awarded at the Awards Presentation. Recipients are not members of the Hall of Fame but are permanently recognized in an exhibit at the museum. To be eligible, an active or retired broadcaster must have a minimum of 10 years of continuous major league broadcast service with a ball club, a network, or a combination of the two. The honor is based on four criteria: longevity; continuity with a club; honors, including national assignments such as the World Series and All-Star Games; and popularity with fans. The recipient was announced on during the 2012 winter meetings, following a vote by the same committee that selected seven of the finalists (below).

Ten finalists were announced on October 9, 2012. In accord with guidelines established in 2003, seven were chosen by a committee composed of the living recipients along with broadcasting historians and columnists. Three were selected from a list of candidates by fan voting at the Hall's Facebook page from August 20 to September 7.

- Committee selections:
  - Ken Coleman
  - John Gordon
  - Graham McNamee
  - Eric Nadel
  - Eduardo Ortega
  - Mike Shannon
  - Dewayne Staats
- Fan selections:
  - Tom Cheek
  - Jacques Doucet
  - Bill King

Six candidates were living when the ballot was announced—the active Doucet, Nadel, Ortega, Shannon, and Staats; and the retired Gordon.

On December 5, Cheek, the lead radio play-by-play announcer for the Toronto Blue Jays from the team's establishment in 1977 until his retirement in 2004, was named the recipient. During this tenure he had a 27-year streak of 4,306 consecutive games plus 41 post-season games called, which lasted from the first ever Blue Jays game on April 7, 1977, to June 3, 2004, when he traveled to Salinas, California, for his father's funeral. Cheek was forced to retire shortly after the funeral when he discovered he had a brain tumor, and he died in 2005. The 2013 balloting marked the ninth consecutive year that Cheek had been named among the 10 finalists for the award.

Cheek became the second Frick Award recipient to have worked primarily for a Canadian team, after 2011 honoree Dave Van Horne; the award was his third for broadcasting excellence from a sports hall of fame. In 2001, while active with the Blue Jays, he received the Jack Graney Award, given irregularly for excellence in either writing or broadcasting, from the Canadian Baseball Hall of Fame. Just before his death in 2005, Canada's Sports Hall of Fame created the Tom Cheek Media Leadership Award, with Cheek as its first recipient.
