= Baseball Assistance Team =

American non-profit organization

- Baseball Assistance Team's logo
- Abbreviation: B.A.T.
- Established: 1986
- Type: Nonprofit
- Legal status: Charity
- Purpose: Alumni Assistance
- Official language: English, Spanish
- President: Buck Martinez (2020-2026), Eduardo Pérez (2026-)
- Vice Presidents: Mark Letendre, Gary Thorne
- Executive Director: Erik Nilsen
- Board of directors: Miguel Batista, Tim Brunswick, Kellie Fischer, Steve Garvey, Pedro Grifol, Todd Helton, Adam Jones, Diane Margolin, Sam McDowell, Alan Nahmias, Christine O'Reilly, Eduardo Pérez, Laurel Prieb, Trevor Rosenthal, Terry Ryan (baseball), Matt Slater, Marnie Starkman, Randy Winn
- Main organ: Board of Directors
- Affiliations: Major League Baseball
- Funding: Endowment and Private Donations
- Staff: 34 (2026)
- Website: www.mlb.com/baseball-assistance-team

The Baseball Assistance Team (B.A.T.) is a 501(c)(3) non-profit organization affiliated with Major League Baseball. The organization's mission is to "confidentially support members of the Baseball Family in need of assistance." The baseball family includes former players, both from the Major and Minor Leagues, former Negro leagues and All-American Girls Professional Baseball League players, umpires, scouts, athletic trainers and MLB and MiLB team personnel.

== History ==
The Baseball Assistance Team was founded in 1986 during the term of Commissioner Peter Ueberroth as a way for Major League Baseball and its players to take care of former players who have fallen upon hard times. Eligibility for help from B.A.T. has since been expanded to include those with two years of service as Major League and Minor League front office personnel, umpires, scouts, Minor League players, athletic trainers, former Negro leagues players, women from the All-American Girls Professional Baseball League, former Major League Baseball Players Association (MLBPA) employees, and their widows, widowers, and children under the age of 23. B.A.T. has expanded its efforts into Latin America where they have provided help to players from Puerto Rico and the Dominican Republic. This organization was founded with the goal of helping members of the Baseball Family during times of hardship, not as a long-term program but as a bridge to help people become self-sufficient. In 1991, a contribution from Major League Baseball, the MLBPA, and the Freedom Foundation established an endowment for B.A.T. While B.A.T. was not, and is not, meant to be a substitute for a pension or retirement savings, it is able to assist in times of need.

In 2018, B.A.T. created a scholarship program for former Major and Minor League players. The program is designed to provide financial assistance in the pursuit of educational and vocational opportunities related to career growth goals.

== Fundraising ==
Major League Baseball provides for the overhead expenses of the Baseball Assistance Team, including salary and travel expenses, which allows all funds raised to be donated to grant recipients. To date, the Baseball Assistance Team has awarded more than $62 million in grants, benefiting more than 10,400 members of the Baseball Family, including current and former, on-field Major & Minor League personnel (players, managers, coaches) as well as scouts, umpires, athletic trainers, Major & Minor League front office personnel, Negro League players, and players from the All-American Girls Professional Baseball League.

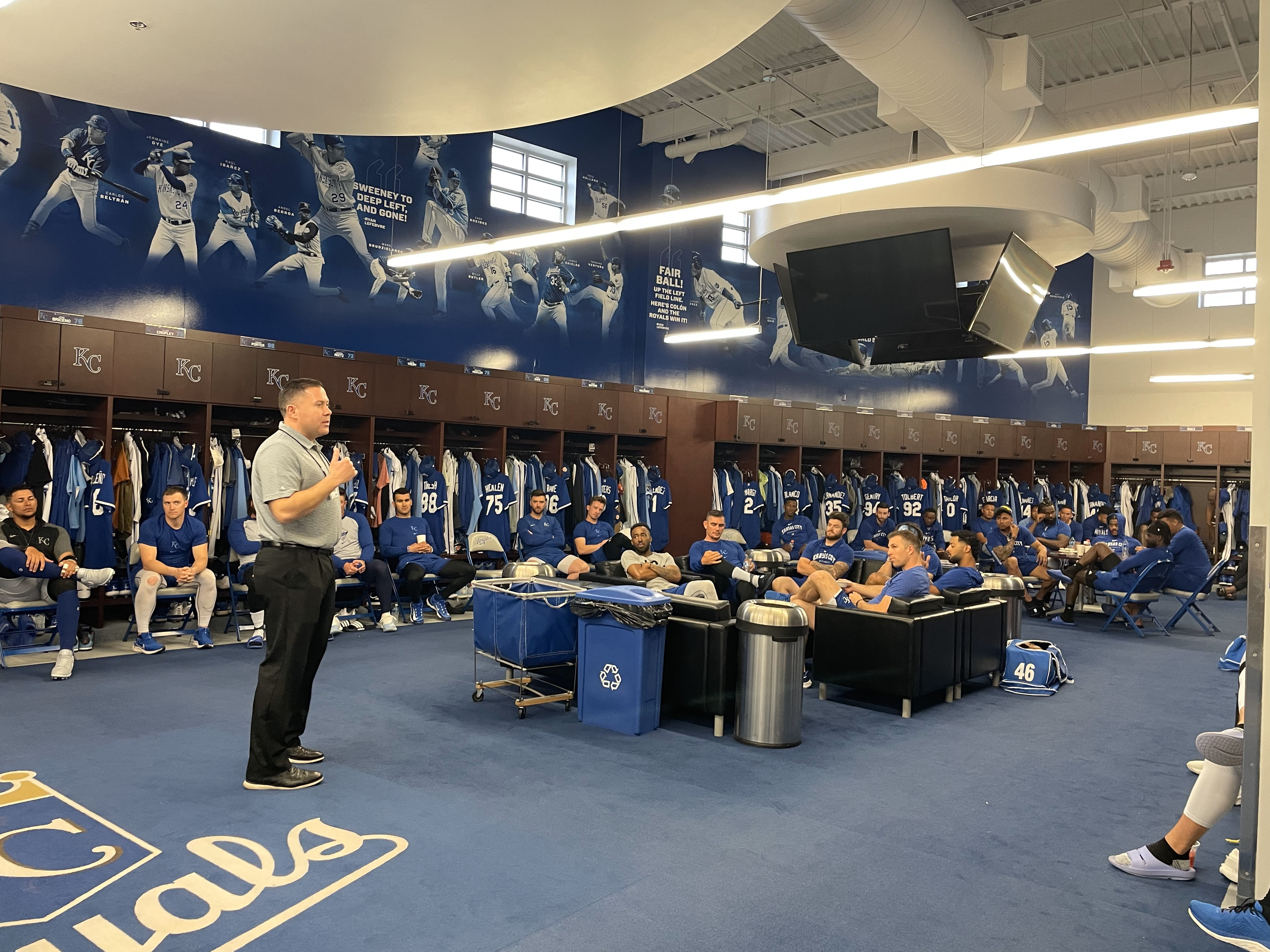
B.A.T. visiting the Kansas City Royals during their 2023 Spring Training Fundraising Tour

=== Spring training visits ===
The annual B.A.T. Spring Training Fundraising Tour is another major endeavor for B.A.T. Since 2003, B.A.T. board members, staff, and former applicants, have visited each team in Major League Baseball and solicited donations, all of which are given back to former players and members of the Baseball Family in need. Through the payroll deduction program, players and coaches can pledge a portion of their salary to B.A.T. which goes directly to the grants. Most importantly, the visits also educate the players to be the eyes and the ears of B.A.T. by notifying the organization about anyone who may be in need of assistance. The teams that donate the most money to B.A.T. are honored each year with the Bobby Murcer Award. The 2023 Bobby Murcer Award recipients are the San Diego Padres and the Chicago White Sox.

== Awards ==
=== B.A.T. Life Time Achievement Award ===
The Lifetime Achievement Award B.A.T. Award, The B.A.T. Lifetime Achievement Award recognizes an individual who has dedicated their services for the betterment of individuals and families who are in need of assistance. Past award winners include Michael Weiner, Bob Gibson, Cookie Rojas, Frank Torre, Bob Watson, and Sam McDowell.

=== Big B.A.T. / Frank Slocum Award ===
The Frank Slocum Big B.A.T. Award, named for the first Executive Director of the Baseball Assistance Team, is given to "an individual or a group of individuals whose exemplary service to B.A.T. has helped provide dignity and self-esteem to members of the Baseball Family." Past award winners include Commissioners Bud Selig, Peter Ueberroth and Fay Vincent, as well as Bob Costas, Bob Uecker, John Carter, Jane Forbes Clark, Richard McWilliams, Rick White, Phil Laskawy, Slocum Family, Joe Malone, Edward Stack, Ozzie Smith, George Brett, the late George M. Steinbrenner, Don Zimmer, Bob Watson, Brad Lidge, Adam Jones, and Jake Peavy.

=== Bart Giamatti Award ===
The Bart Giamatti award is given to the "individual associated with baseball who best exemplifies the compassion demonstrated by the late commissioner." Generally, it is given to a player involved in a wide range of charity work, benefiting both those involved with the game of baseball and those in the community at large. Previous winners include CC Sabathia, Cal Ripken Jr., Ken Griffey Jr., Derek Jeter, Al Leiter, Don Mattingly, Tom Glavine, Jorge Posada, Dale Murphy, Tim Wakefield, and Carlos Beltran.

== Leadership ==
=== Board of directors ===
- President: Buck Martinez
- Vice Presidents: Mark Letendre, Gary Thorne
- Members: Miguel Batista, Tim Brunswick, Jane Forbes Clark, Kellie Fischer, Steve Garvey, Pedro Grifol, Adam Jones, Diane Margolin, Sam McDowell, Alan Nahmias, Christine O'Reilly, Eduardo Perez, Laurel Prieb, Trevor Rosenthal, Terry Ryan, Matt Slater, Staci Slaughter, Marnie Starkman, and Randy Winn.

=== Operations ===
- Erik Nilsen - Executive Director
- Michelle Romanelli – Senior Manager
- Mariana Rosado - Manager
- Eddy Tapia – Lead Case Manager
- Carlos Villavicencio – Senior Coordinator, Financial Operations
- Katie Mendoza-Luna – Financial Administrator
- Betsy Molina – Administrator
- Leonel Bejaran-Specht – Career Transition Specialist
- Andy Colon - Career Transition Coordinator
- Kyra Grodman - Financial Assistant

=== Consultants ===
- Mental Health and Addiction Recovery - Tim McDowell
- Dominican Republic - Dr. Genoveva Javier
- Puerto Rico - Jayson Pérez
- Puerto Rico - Iván Reyes
- Financial Consultant - DJ Enga

=== Assistant Consultants ===
- Assistant to Tim McDowell - Scott Roy
- Assistant to Dr. Javier - Alex Nolasco

=== B.A.T. Caseworkers ===
- Anna Cortes
- Patricia Mora
- Diana Muniz
- Kassandra Pascual
- Juan Pauli
- Ronald Peralta
- Catherine Reyes
- Rogerio Reyes
