= Dick Kaegel =

American sportswriter

- Born: Richard James Kaegel; 1939 (age 85–86); Belleville, Illinois, U.S.
- Occupation: Sportswriter
- Employer(s): Granite City Press Record, The Sporting News, Kansas City Star, MLB.com
- Spouse: Betty
- Awards: J. G. Taylor Spink Award

Richard James Kaegel (born October 1939) is an American sportswriter. As a beat writer, he covered the St. Louis Cardinals and Kansas City Royals of Major League Baseball, and also served as the editor-in-chief for The Sporting News.

== Biography ==
Kaegel is from Belleville, Illinois. While he was a senior at Belleville Township High School, he was hired as a full-time sportswriter for the Belleville News-Democrat in 1956, at the age of 16, on the recommendation of his high school journalism teacher. The arrangement allowed him to work for the paper in the morning and complete his schooling in the afternoons. He graduated from high school in 1957 and earned a Bachelor of Journalism from the University of Missouri in 1961.

After graduating from college, Kaegel was hired as a sportswriter for the Columbia Daily Tribune. He worked for the Granite City Press Record in 1964 as their sports editor, covering the 1964 World Series. He worked for The Sporting News as an associate editor from 1965 through 1968. He then covered the St. Louis Cardinals for the St. Louis Post-Dispatch from 1968 through 1979. From 1979 through 1985, he was the editor-in-chief of The Sporting News. Kaegel was a sports columnist for the St. Louis Globe-Democrat from 1985 through 1986, and then covered the Kansas City Royals for the Kansas City Star from 1988 through 2003 and for MLB.com from 2004 until he retired in 2014. During the 2011 season, Kaegel covered all 162 games for the Royals four years after having a liver transplant. Kaegel also served as a voting member of the Veterans Committee in the 2012 and 2015 Baseball Hall of Fame balloting.

Kaegel was named the 2021 recipient of the J. G. Taylor Spink Award, subsequently renamed as the BBWAA Career Excellence Award, which is bestowed annually by the Baseball Writers' Association of America (BBWAA) with recipients honored during ceremonies at the National Baseball Hall of Fame in Cooperstown, New York.

== Personal life ==
Kaegel and his wife, Betty, live in Lee's Summit, Missouri.
