= Paul Hagen (sportswriter) =

American sports columnist

- Born: February 25, 1951 (age 74)
- Occupation: Sportswriter
- Employer(s): Dallas Times-Herald, Fort Worth Star-Telegram, Philadelphia Daily News, MLB.com
- Awards: J. G. Taylor Spink Award (2013)

Paul Daniel Hagen (born February 25, 1951) is an American sports columnist who covers baseball.

== Career ==
Hagen attended Ohio University. He began his career in 1974 working in San Bernardino, California, where he covered the Los Angeles Dodgers for three years. Hagen also worked in the Dallas–Fort Worth area for ten years covering the Texas Rangers for the Dallas Times-Herald and Fort Worth Star-Telegram. He then worked for 25 years in Philadelphia covering the Philadelphia Phillies for the Philadelphia Daily News, starting in 1987. He now works for MLB.com, as a national reporter focusing on the Phillies.

== Awards and honors ==
Hagen was named the 2013 recipient of the J. G. Taylor Spink Award by the Baseball Writers' Association of America in December 2012, and formally received the award on July 27, 2013 at the annual Hall of Fame Awards Presentation in Cooperstown, New York. The presentation took place the day before the Hall's induction ceremony for its 2013 class.
