= Jane Forbes Clark =

American businesswoman (born 1955)

- Born: May 11, 1955 (age 71); New York City, U.S.
- Education: Foxcroft School; Bennett College (B.A.)
- Occupation: Chairman of the Board of Directors at the National Baseball Hall of Fame and Museum
- Relatives: Stephen Carlton Clark (grandfather)

Jane Forbes Clark (born May 11, 1955) is an American businesswoman, baseball player, and philanthropist who is best known for being the chairman of the Board of Directors at the National Baseball Hall of Fame and Museum. She is a member of the Clark family, a prominent New York business family who became known for their involvement in baseball, arts patronage, and horse racing.

== Early life and education ==
Clark was born in New York City to Stephen C. Clark Jr. and Jane Forbes Clark (née Wilbur). She is a member of the Clark family who own a number of properties in Cooperstown, New York. Her grandfather was Stephen Carlton Clark who founded the National Baseball Hall of Fame and Museum. Since the age of four, Clark has been a keen horse-rider.

After graduating from Foxcroft School in Virginia, where she grew up, Clark attended Bennett College in Millbrook, New York, where she studied interior design; she later said she attended because "they had a great riding program and I could take my horses."

== Career ==
Having served on the Board of Directors at the Baseball Hall of Fame since 1992, Clark became chairwoman of the board in 2000. She has made it a point to try to bring all living Hall of Famers to the annual induction ceremony in Cooperstown. Each year, Clark helps organize parties and golf outings for Hall of Famers and also arranges tours for their spouses at places like the Fenimore Art Museum and the Glimmerglass Opera. She also serves on the Board of Directors of the Baseball Assistance Team.

Outside of baseball, she is heavily involved in horse racing. In the 1996 Summer Olympics, she became the first owner whose horses won medals in two different disciplines. She served as the vice president (1982–1991) and the president (1991–1997) of the American Horse Show Association, and has served on boards of numerous equestrian associations.

== Personal life ==
Clark has never married and lives at The Dakota on Manhattan's Upper West Side. Her office is located at Rockefeller Center. She has also lived part-time in Cooperstown, New York, since 1980, where she tends to her horses and runs the Clark Foundation that governs and maintains the Clark family properties in the region.

== See also ==
- Women in baseball
