= Phil Pepe =

- Born: Philip Francis Pepe; March 21, 1935; Brooklyn, New York
- Died: December 13, 2015 (aged 80); Englewood, New Jersey
- Occupations: Sports writer, author and broadcaster
- Organization(s): Baseball Writers' Association of America; New York Daily News; New York World-Telegram; WCBS Radio

Philip Francis Pepe [peppy] (March 21, 1935 – December 13, 2015) was an American baseball writer and radio voice who spent more than five decades covering sports in New York City.

== Early life ==
Born in Brooklyn, Phil Pepe grew up rooting for the local Brooklyn Dodgers, even though he spent most of his time as a baseball reporter with the loathed team of his childhood, the New York Yankees.

Pepe graduated from Lafayette High School and St. John's University. After graduating from St. John's, Pepe joined the New York World-Telegram in 1957 for which he was the New York Yankees beat writer in 1961, the same year that Roger Maris broke Babe Ruth's single-season home run record. Pepe remained at the New York World Telegram & Sun until the newspaper folded in 1966. After that, he wrote scripts along with Howard Cosell for ABC Radio. He then joined the New York Daily News in 1968.

== Career ==
Pepe covered baseball for the New York Daily News from 1969 through 1981 and then succeeded Dick Young as its featured sports columnist in 1982. During the same period, Pepe wrote the lead game story for every World Series from 1969 to 1981, even in years when the Yankees did not make the Series. In between, he covered most of Muhammad Ali's championship fights, Super Bowl I and three Olympic Games, as well as the New York Knicks during their championship years. In 1970, his book, The Incredible Knicks was published, highlighting their championship season.

Prominently, Pepe was a longtime Yankees beat writer who chronicled players such as Yogi Berra, Mickey Mantle, Reggie Jackson, and Derek Jeter. Pepe also authored books on other figures in sports, including Come Out Smokin’ on heavyweight champion Joe Frazier and covering athletes such as boxer Muhammad Ali. In addition, he wrote on basketball players such as Walt Frazier and Willis Reed.

After leaving the News in 1989, Pepe did morning sports for WCBS radio for more than 15 years, which included his popular "Pep Talk" segment. In addition, he was the director of broadcasting and a radio analyst for the Class-A New Jersey Cardinals of the New York–Penn League from 1994 to 2005.

Among his books about the Yankees, Pepe wrote My Favorite Summer 1956, with Mickey Mantle, which spent time on the New York Times Bestseller List, and “New York Yankees:1961” an account of the Mantle-Maris home run chase for Ruth's record. He also wrote The Wit and Wisdom of Yogi Berra; Slick, an autobiography of Whitey Ford; Core Four, about Derek Jeter, Jorge Posada, Andy Pettitte and Mariano Rivera in a more recent period of team's success, as well as Yankee Doodles, a handful of recollections from his experiences with the team.

Pepe also was esteemed for the tireless work he did on behalf of the New York chapter of the Baseball Writers' Association of America, where he served as chapter chairman from 1975 to 1976 and executive director from 1991 until 2015. Most notably, he attended every BBWAA awards dinner in New York from 1962 unto his death and ran the annual event for more than two decades.

Pepe died in 2015 at his home in Englewood, New Jersey at the age of 80. The cause was an apparent heart attack.
