= Gary Hughes (baseball) =

American baseball executive (1941–2020)

Hughes

Gary Hughes (February 2, 1941 – September 19, 2020) was an American baseball executive. He also served as a coach and scout.

== Career ==
Hughes went to Junípero Serra High School in San Mateo, California; one of his classmates was Jim Fregosi. He graduated from San Jose State University. He served as the baseball coach at Marin Catholic High School from 1964 through 1972. He then became a part-time scout, working in Northern California for the San Francisco Giants, Seattle Mariners, and New York Mets, before he was hired on a full-time basis by the New York Yankees. Hughes became the scouting director for the Montreal Expos, and the assistant general manager and scouting director for the Florida Marlins, starting at the organization's inception in 1991. After working briefly for the Colorado Rockies and Cincinnati Reds, Hughes worked for the Chicago Cubs from 2002 through 2011 as the special assistant to the general manager. The Red Sox hired Hughes in 2012 as a scout.

== Honors ==
Baseball America presented Hughes with its lifetime achievement award in 2007. Hughes was listed in Baseball Americas year 2000 retrospective list naming the top 10 scouts of the previous 100 years. He was inducted into the Marin Catholic Hall of Fame in 2007 and Professional Baseball Scouts Hall of Fame in 2009.

== Personal ==
Hughes had five children, four step-children, seventeen grandchildren and two great-grandchildren. His son Sam Hughes was a football quarterback. Hughes' son Michael "Rock" Hughes is the visiting clubhouse manager for the Miami Marlins and is the longest termed full time employee of the Marlins, being with the team since it was founded. Rock is married to the sister of Milwaukee Brewers manager Craig Counsell. Hughes’ son Sam is a National Crosschecker with the New York Yankees.
