= 2012–13 NHL lockout =

NHL labour dispute

- Date: September 15, 2012 – January 6, 2013 (3 months, 3 weeks and 1 day)
- Location: United States; Canada
- Caused by: Expiration of the 2005 NHL Collective Bargaining Agreement; Stalemate over division of the NHL's league-related income and salary cap structure between NHL club owners and players
- Goals: Reduction of players' salaries to 46% of the league's income; Extend entry-level contracts; Revise revenue-sharing system
- Result: Agreement reached to end lockout on January 6, 2013: New ten-year collective bargaining agreement ratified on January 9; 2012–13 season reduced to 48 games per team

Parties
National Hockey League Players' Association (NHLPA)	National Hockey League (NHL)

Lead figures
Donald Fehr (executive director)	Gary Bettman (commissioner); Bill Daly (deputy commissioner)

The 2012–13 NHL lockout was a labor dispute between the National Hockey League (NHL) and the National Hockey League Players' Association (NHLPA) that began at 11:59 pm EDT on September 15, 2012. A tentative deal on a new collective bargaining agreement (CBA) was reached on January 6, 2013, with its ratification and signing of a memorandum of understanding on the agreement completed by January 12, 2013, 119 days after the expiry of the previous CBA.

The owners of the league's franchises, led by NHL commissioner Gary Bettman, declared a lockout of the members of the NHLPA after a new agreement could not be reached before the expiry of the NHL collective bargaining agreement on September 16, 2012. The lockout shortened the 2012–13 NHL season, originally scheduled to begin on October 11, 2012, from 82 to 48 games, a reduction of 41.5 percent. The revised season started on January 19, 2013, and ended on April 28, 2013.

An issue for the owners were desires to reduce the players' guaranteed 57% share of hockey-related revenues, introduce term limits on contracts, eliminate salary arbitration, and change free agency rules. The union's initial offers focused on increased revenue sharing between owners and a fixed salary cap that is not linked to league revenues. As the deadline for a work stoppage approached, the union unsuccessfully challenged the league's ability to lock out players of three Canadian teams – the Edmonton Oilers and Calgary Flames (in the jurisdiction of Alberta), and the Montreal Canadiens (in the jurisdiction of Quebec).

The dispute was the third lockout in the 19 years since Bettman became Commissioner in 1993, following player lockouts in 1994–95 and 2004–05, with the latter case leading to the cancellation of the entire season. This was also the third labor dispute for NHLPA executive director Donald Fehr who, as head of the Major League Baseball Players Association, led his union through a lockout in 1990 and a strike in 1994–95.

During the lockout, many NHL players went to other leagues in North America and Europe. Many businesses in the United States and Canada located near NHL arenas lost money as a result of the games not played.

== Cancelled games ==
All games on the original 2012–13 NHL calendar up to January 14, 2013, were cancelled, including the 2013 NHL Winter Classic between the Detroit Red Wings and the Toronto Maple Leafs, which was rescheduled for 2014. In addition, the 2013 All-Star Game, scheduled for January 27, was postponed to 2014 then postponed again to 2015 because of participation at the 2014 Winter Olympics. The revised 48-game schedule resulted in the cancellation of 510 regular season games, comprising 41.5 percent of the season.

== Issues ==
The owners identified their key issues in their first offer, presented on July 13, 2012. Their offer retained the framework established following the 2004–05 NHL lockout but made numerous changes to player salary and movement rights:

- Reduce the players' share of hockey-related revenues from 57 percent to 46 percent, while also redefining hockey-related revenues, so that the players' share would be reduced to 43 percent based on the definition in the expired CBA.
- Set a maximum term of four years on all new players' contracts.
- Eliminate signing bonuses and set a uniform salary for each year of a contract, thus eliminating front-loading of contracts.
- Extend entry-level contracts for players entering the league from three years to five.
- Extend qualification for unrestricted free agency from seven years in the league to ten.

The players' union waited a month to offer a counter-proposal as it requested additional financial data from the league. When the union proposed it on August 14, it retained a salary cap, but de-linked it from revenue. It proposed a fixed cap for three years, followed by a players' option to return to the terms of the expired CBA in the fourth year. Fehr suggested their proposal could save the league as much as $465 million and would feature an enhanced revenue sharing system that would help lower-revenue teams.

== Negotiations ==
The two parties exchanged a pair of offers as the deadline for a lockout approached. The union's last offer before the expiry of the collective bargaining agreement continued to call for an unlinked salary cap that would steadily increase over a five-year term. Donald Fehr argued that if the league continued to see revenue increase at the seven percent average of the 2005–2012 CBA, the players' share of revenues would drop from the 57 percent they received in 2011–12 to a low of 52 percent in 2015–16, but increase in the final two years of the deal back to 54 percent. The NHL countered with a time-limited offer where it would continue with the existing definition of hockey-related revenue and a linked salary cap that would pay the players 49 percent of revenues in 2012–13 and fall to 47 percent by the sixth year of the deal. Each side rejected the others' offer, and some veteran players expressed willingness to sit out an entire season if necessary. The National Hockey League officially locked its players out when the CBA expired, and on September 19, cancelled all preseason games for the month of September. Several players then signed contracts to play in European leagues for the duration of the dispute.

The NHLPA challenged the NHL's right to lock out the players in two Canadian jurisdictions. Sixteen members of the Montreal Canadiens unsuccessfully sought a temporary injunction from the Quebec labor Relations Board that would prevent the team from locking its players out of practice facilities and would have required the Canadiens to pay its players regardless. Twenty-one members of the Calgary Flames and Edmonton Oilers sought similar relief from the Alberta labor Relations Board, but the board ruled in favour of the NHL.

Having cancelled the remainder of the preseason, and regular season games up to November 1, on October 16, Bettman offered a 50–50 revenue split in the owners' latest CBA proposal. Two days later, the Players' Association presented three counterproposals. Both sides were still far apart when negotiations ended. The league, which refused to negotiate with the NHLPA unless they used the league proposal as the starting point, withdrew its offer after negotiations failed. Subsequently, on October 26, the NHL cancelled all games scheduled for November, including the annual Hall of Fame game, scheduled for November 9 at the Air Canada Centre, and the Black Friday Thanksgiving Showdown scheduled to air on NBC. In addition, the 2013 NHL Winter Classic was cancelled on November 2.

The league and players' association resumed negotiations on November 6, meeting over six consecutive days in a neutral, undisclosed location. The NHL offered to pay a $211 million "make whole provision" over the first two years of the deal to honour existing player contracts; the NHLPA sought $590 million. On November 21, the NHLPA made a new proposal that left the sides $182 million apart, which Bettman immediately rejected. Two days later, all games up to December 14 were cancelled, as well as the All-Star Game.

The NHL and NHLPA agreed to mediation under the auspices of the Federal Mediation and Conciliation Service on November 26. The sides met with mediators on November 28 and 29, but the mediators quit after that point, determining they could not make any progress reconciling the two parties' demands.

Following mediation, Bettman proposed a meeting between players and team owners to Donald Fehr, and Jamal Mayers tweeted that the NHLPA had made a similar offer to meet directly with owners. From December 4 to 6, six team owners, 17–19 players, and staff from both sides met to negotiate and exchange proposals. The league offered to raise the "Make Whole" provision to $300 million and to give ground on player contracting and pension issues, but identified three components of the CBA they considered important: a five-year limit on player contracts, a ten-year length of the new CBA, and compliance issues. The players offered an eight-year limit on contracts and an eight-year CBA with an opt-out clause after six years. The NHL rejected the offer, and talks broke down again. After negotiations failed, Bettman delivered a press conference saying the "Make Whole" provision would be pulled off the table. He also stated that the league would deny the union's request to bring mediators back into the negotiations. Four days later, the NHL cancelled all games up to December 30.

After talks broke down, rumours leaked that the NHLPA planned on filing a "disclaimer of interest" (a quicker, less formal way to dissolve the players' union, compared with decertification) and, with collective bargaining no longer in effect, pursuing an antitrust lawsuit against the NHL. The NHL responded on December 14 by filing a class action suit with the U.S. District Court in New York seeking to establish that its lockout was legal. Included in the lawsuit was a request for all existing player contracts to be "void and unenforceable", should the NHLPA be dissolved, resulting in all NHL players becoming free agents. The league also filed an unfair labor practice charge with the National Labor Relations Board, stating that the union had been negotiating in bad faith and that its threat to disclaim interest was a negotiating ploy that violated the collective bargaining process. In a vote conducted from December 17 to 21, the players authorized the union's executive board to file a disclaimer of interest, up until January 2, 2013, though it did not proceed with the filing. On December 20, the league cancelled all games up to January 14, 2013.

After a Christmas hiatus, the league made another offer to the players on December 27. The offer was reportedly for a ten-year contract with an opt-out clause after eight, and included a US$60 million salary cap taking effect in 2013, a six-year term limit on player contracts (seven years for teams re-signing their own players), an increase in the allowed amount of variance year-to-year in player contracts to ten percent from the originally proposed five, and the make-whole provision remaining the same as the previous offer. The proposal required a minimum 48-game regular season schedule starting no later than January 19 which would be preceded by a one-week training camp, thereby requiring an agreement to be reached by January 11. Face-to-face negotiations recommenced shortly thereafter. With the expiry of the NHLPA's authorization to file a disclaimer of interest, the two sides continued to discuss three key issues: player pensions, the salary cap (with the players requesting a US$65 million cap for the second year of the collective bargaining agreement), and contract lengths.

== Resolution ==
Around 4:45 am EST on January 6, after approximately 16 continuous hours of negotiating, a tentative deal was reached on a new collective bargaining agreement to end the lockout. The terms included a limit of eight years on contract extensions and seven years on new contracts, a salary floor of US$44 million and a salary cap of US$60 million (a two-year transition period will allow teams to spend up to US$70.2 million in the deal's first season, prorated for the season length, and up to a salary cap of US$64.3 million in the second season), a maximum 50-percent variance in the salaries over the course of a contract, mandatory acceptance of arbitration awards under US$3.5 million, no realignment, and an amnesty period to buy out contracts that do not fit under the salary cap.

The NHL Board of Governors ratified the new CBA on January 9, followed three days later by the ratification of the deal by the NHLPA members, and the signing of a memorandum of understanding between the two parties, officially marking their agreement to the CBA. A 48-game schedule was played, starting on January 19, 2013, and ending on April 28, 2013, with no inter-conference games.

== Alternatives for players ==
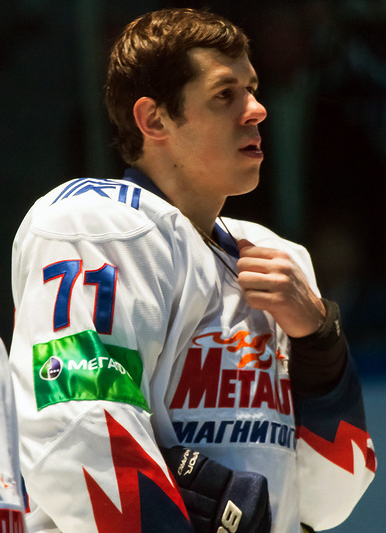
Evgeni Malkin as a Metallurg Magnitogorsk player in 2012.

As in the 2004–05 NHL lockout, the players had numerous options for playing professional hockey during the lockout. All players eligible for the American Hockey League were assigned to their AHL clubs leading into the lockout, as were players still eligible to play junior hockey. More experienced players sought employment in European leagues such as the predominantly Russian Kontinental Hockey League (KHL), Finland's SM-liiga, Germany's Deutsche Eishockey Liga (DEL), Austria's Erste Bank Hockey League (EBEL), the Czech Extraliga (ELH), the Slovak Extraliga, Switzerland's National League A (NLA), Norway's GET-ligaen, the United Kingdom's Elite Ice Hockey League (EIHL) and the Swedish Elitserien (SEL), the last of which largely resisted signing locked-out NHL players.

By November 15, over 170 NHL players had joined teams in Europe. Pavel Datsyuk, Ilya Kovalchuk, Evgeni Malkin, and Alexander Ovechkin were among the stars who returned to their native Russia. Nicklas Backstrom also decided to play in Russia together with his teammate Ovechkin. Other players, such as Patrice Bergeron, Logan Couture, Patrick Kane, Rick Nash, Matt Duchene, Tyler Seguin, Jason Spezza, Max Pacioretty, John Tavares, Joe Thornton and Henrik Zetterberg, signed with teams in Switzerland.

The assignment of NHL players to the AHL caused a trickle-down effect that pushed AHL players to the ECHL, ECHL players to lower leagues such as the CHL, FHL and SPHL, and marginal players from those leagues out of professional hockey.

With the large number of notable NHL players playing in Europe, American sports network ESPN signed a multi-platform deal with the KHL to televise the game of the week on its television and online platforms, a deal that cost the network less than US$100,000 in rights fees. This was followed by another American television network, MSG, also securing rights for broadcasting select KHL games.

The 2012 Spengler Cup in Davos, Switzerland, also included a number of NHL players who would likely not have participated if not for the lockout. Top NHLers, including Patrice Bergeron, Tyler Seguin, Jason Spezza, and John Tavares, helped Team Canada win its first Spengler Cup since 2007.

During the lockout, several NHL players threatened to not return if the lockout was to end. Lubomir Visnovsky was the only one not to report to his NHL team, the New York Islanders, for the delayed start of the season and was suspended by the Islanders. His agent said on January 26, 2013, that Visnovsky would report to the team by February 11.

== Effects ==
Gary Bettman stated that during the lockout, "the business is probably losing between $18 and $20 million a day and the players are losing between $8 and $10 million a day." The league office cut employees' pay by 20 percent, and some teams laid off employees and cut pay, as well.

In Canada, businesses in areas with NHL teams were hurt because of the lockout. Canadian lotteries also lost money. Molson-Coors reported reduced sales in Canada, blaming the lack of sales on the arenas being empty and people not having hockey parties taking away many beer-buying opportunities. In the United States, businesses located near NHL arenas were affected negatively due to the lockout.

Kraft Hockeyville 2013 was cancelled due to the lockout. Hockey Day in Canada was moved from Lloydminster to Peterborough.

During the lockout, NHL players participated in a few charity games. "Operation Hat Trick", a charity hockey game, was played at Boardwalk Hall in Atlantic City to raise money for Hurricane Sandy victims. The game, which was held on November 24, 2012, saw the team captained by Brad Richards defeat the team captained by Scott Hartnell, 10–6. Some of the NHL players that also participated in the game included Henrik Lundqvist, Martin Brodeur, Andy Greene, Bobby Ryan, and James van Riemsdyk.

Because of the shortened season, hockey card manufacturers did not include many rookies (such as Nail Yakupov) in the season's product lines.

When the season started on January 19, 2013, the Chicago Blackhawks began a streak of 24 consecutive games without a regulation loss, setting an NHL record. On June 24, the Blackhawks defeated the Boston Bruins to win the Stanley Cup.

The average attendance for the season was 17,768, up 2.6 percent from the previous year.
