= Michael Weiner =

Michael Weiner may refer to:

- Michael Weiner (professor) (born 1949), professor of East Asian History
- Michael Weiner (actor) (born 1975), American actor and composer
- Michael Savage (Michael Weiner, born 1942), American talk-radio host and commentator
- Michael Weiner (executive) (1961–2013), executive director of Major League Baseball Players Association
- Michael Weiner (referee) (born 1969), German football referee
