= Dick Moss =

American labor lawyer (1931–2024)

Richard M. "Dick" Moss
- Born: July 30, 1931 (age 94); Near Pittsburgh, Pennsylvania, U.S.
- Died: September 21, 2024 (aged 93); Santa Monica, California, U.S.
- Education: University of Pittsburgh (B.A., 1952); Harvard Law School (J.D., 1955)
- Occupation: Labor attorney · Sports agent
- Years active: 1960s–1990s
- Organizations: Major League Baseball Players Association; United Steelworkers (legal counsel); private sports management firm
- Known for: Key legal architect of baseball free agency (Seitz decision, 1975); bar-gained collective bargaining agreements; represented players including Nolan Ryan, Gary Carter
- Spouse(s): Carol Freis (third wife, married 1980)
- Children: One daughter (Nancy Moss Ephron)

Richard Myron Moss (July 30, 1931 – September 21, 2024) was an American labor lawyer. He argued the 1975 case involving pitchers Dave McNally and Andy Messersmith which led to the Seitz decision. The decision, which got rid of the reserve clause that bound players to teams unless their contracts expired or they were traded or released, led to free agency in Major League Baseball (MLB).

== Early life and education ==
Moss was born on July 30, 1931, near Pittsburgh, Pennsylvania, to Nathan and Celia (Rosenblatt) Moss. He completed his bachelor's degree at the University of Pittsburgh in 1952, followed by a Juris Doctor degree from Harvard University in 1955. After graduating, he served in the U.S. Army for two years before entering the legal field.

== Career ==
Moss began his legal career in government service before joining the United Steelworkers of America in 1960. It was during this time that he met Marvin Miller, who would become his mentor. When Miller was appointed the first executive director of the MLB Players Association in 1966, he brought Moss along to help educate players on union strategies and negotiate agreements. Together, they secured MLB's first collective bargaining agreement in 1968, and later an arbitration system in 1970.

Moss played a crucial role in several landmark cases, most notably the 1975 case involving Los Angeles Dodgers pitcher Andy Messersmith. Moss successfully argued that MLB's reserve clause, which had historically bound players to their teams indefinitely, should only allow for a one-year renewal. This decision, upheld in federal court, was a key factor in the establishment of free agency for MLB players. At the time of the decision, the average MLB salary was a little under $45,000. It rose to $76,000 by 1977 and the average MLB salary was $4.5 million by 2023, a 100-fold increase.

Following this success, Moss transitioned to a career as a sports agent, representing notable players such as Nolan Ryan, Fernando Valenzuela, and Gary Carter. He negotiated some of the largest contracts in baseball at the time, including Ryan's record-breaking $4.5 million deal with the Houston Astros in 1979.

== Personal life and death ==
Moss was married three times. He was survived by his third wife, whom he married in 1980, and his daughter, Nancy, from his second marriage. His other daughter, Betsy, predeceased him. Moss spent much of his later life in the Los Angeles area, where he was involved in various philanthropic efforts, including serving on the board of a chapter of the NAACP's Legal Defense Fund.

Moss died in Santa Monica, California, on September 21, 2024, at the age of 93.
