= 2020 Baseball Hall of Fame balloting =

Elections to the Baseball Hall of Fame

National Baseball

Hall of Fame and Museum
- New inductees: 4
- via BBWAA: 2
- via Modern Baseball Era Committee: 2
- Total inductees: 333
- Induction date: September 8, 2021

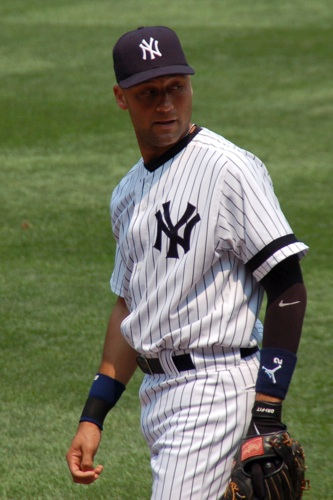
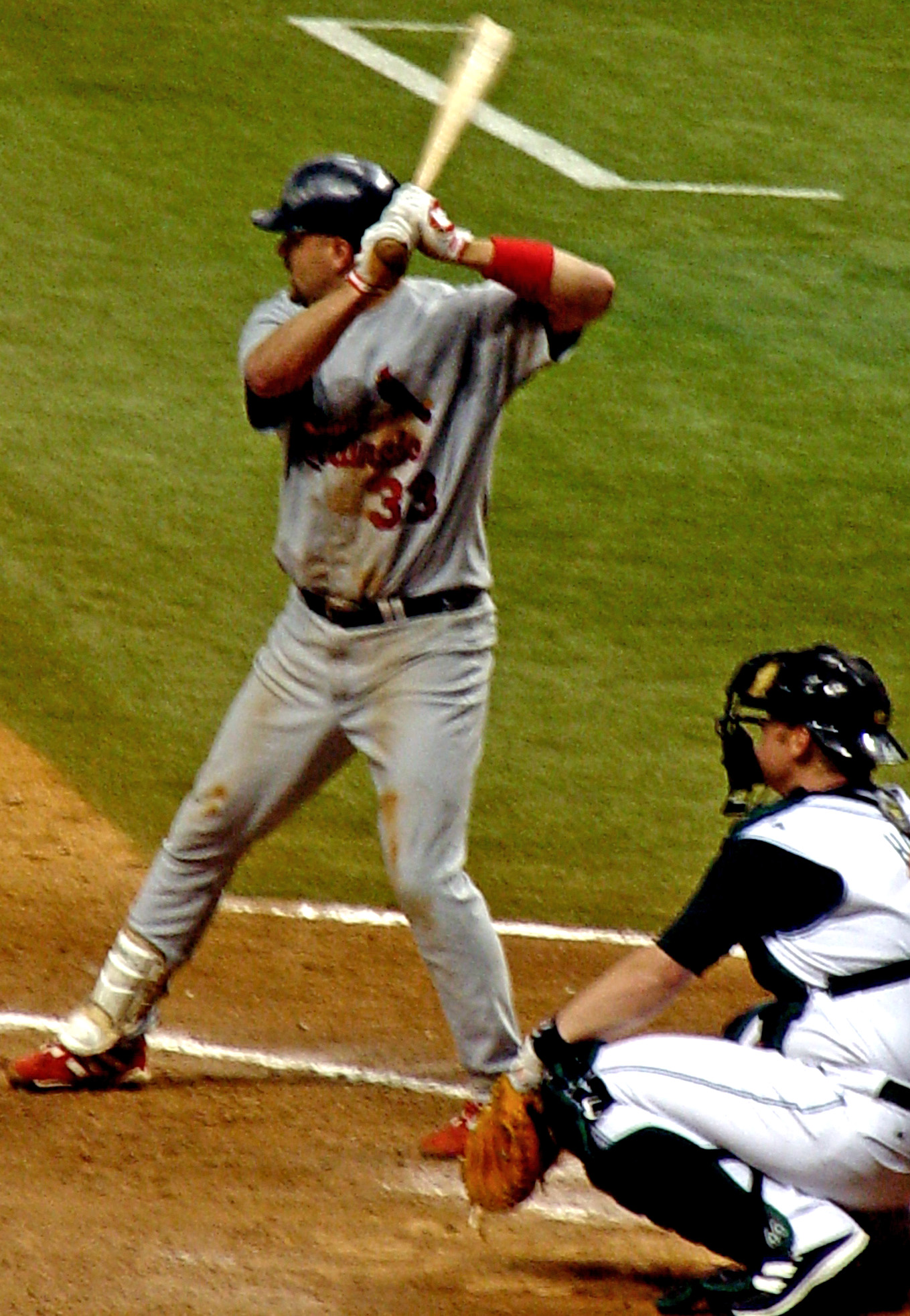
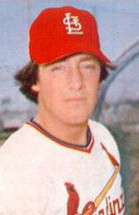
2020 inductees (L-R): Derek Jeter, Larry Walker, and Ted Simmons. Marvin Miller was also elected.

Elections to the National Baseball Hall of Fame for 2020 proceeded according to rules most recently amended in 2016. As in the past, the Baseball Writers' Association of America (BBWAA) voted by mail to select from a ballot of recently retired players. The results were announced on January 21, 2020, with Derek Jeter and Larry Walker elected to the Hall of Fame.

The Modern Baseball Era Committee, one of four voting panels that since 2016 have taken over the role of the more broadly defined Veterans Committee, convened at the Major League Baseball Winter Meetings in December 2019 to select from a ballot of retired players and non-playing personnel who made their greatest contributions to the sport in the 1970–1987 period. The committee elected former player Ted Simmons and former executive Marvin Miller.

The formal induction ceremony was to be held at the Hall's facilities in Cooperstown, New York, on July 26, 2020. However, due to the coronavirus pandemic, the 2020 induction ceremony was canceled. Inductees from 2020 were honored during ceremonies on September 8, 2021.

== BBWAA election ==
The BBWAA election rules were largely identical to those that were in effect for the most recent elections. The most recent change to BBWAA voting rules, announced in 2015, tightened the qualifications for the BBWAA electorate. Beginning with the 2016 election, eligible voters must not only have 10 years of continuous BBWAA membership, but also be currently active members. When these changes were announced, the pool of eligible voters also included those who had held active status within the 10 years prior to the election. A BBWAA member who has not been active for more than 10 years can regain voting status by covering MLB in the year preceding the election. However, as of the 2020 balloting process, the BBWAA and Hall of Fame have apparently redefined "active membership" to remove the vote from anyone who did not cover MLB games for two years, instead of 10.

On November 18, 2019, the Hall of Fame released the list of players on the ballot. The ballot included two categories of players:

- Candidates from the 2019 ballot who received at least 5% of the vote but were not elected, as long as they first appeared on the BBWAA ballot no earlier than 2010. There were 14 such players, including Larry Walker, who was in his 10th and final year of eligibility.
- Selected individuals, chosen by a screening committee, whose last major league appearance was in 2014. The screening committee selected 18 such players, including José Valverde, who had not officially retired, and pitched as recently as July 2019 in the Mexican Baseball League.

Unofficial voting totals were tracked online.

A total of 397 ballots were cast, with 298 votes needed to reach the 75% threshold for election. A total of 2,613 votes were cast for individual players, an average of 6.58 votes per ballot, a sharp decline from the year earlier. Derek Jeter fell one vote short of becoming the second player unanimously elected, a feat first (and to date, only) accomplished by Mariano Rivera, when elected in 2019. Larry Walker became the seventh player in the modern voting era (since 1966) to be elected in his final ballot, after Red Ruffing, Joe Medwick, Ralph Kiner, Jim Rice, Tim Raines, and Edgar Martínez.

Hall of Fame voting results for class of 2020
Player	Votes	Percent	Change	Year
**Derek Jeter**†	396	99.7%	–	1st
**Larry Walker**	304	76.5%	▲21.9%	10th
Curt Schilling	278	70.0%	▲9.1%	8th
Roger Clemens	242	61.0%	▲1.5%	8th
Barry Bonds	241	60.7%	▲1.6%	8th
Omar Vizquel	209	52.6%	▲9.8%	3rd
Scott Rolen	140	35.3%	▲18.1%	3rd
Billy Wagner	126	31.7%	▲15.0%	5th
Gary Sheffield	121	30.5%	▲16.9%	6th
Todd Helton	116	29.2%	▲12.7%	2nd
Manny Ramirez	112	28.2%	▲5.4%	4th
Jeff Kent	109	27.5%	▲9.4%	7th
Andruw Jones	77	19.4%	▲11.5%	3rd
Sammy Sosa	55	13.9%	▲5.4%	8th
Andy Pettitte	45	11.3%	▲1.4%	2nd
Bobby Abreu†	22	5.5%	–	1st
Paul Konerko†*	10	2.5%	–	1st
Jason Giambi†*	6	1.5%	–	1st
Alfonso Soriano†*	6	1.5%	–	1st
Eric Chavez†*	2	0.5%	–	1st
Cliff Lee†*	2	0.5%	–	1st
Adam Dunn†*	1	0.3%	–	1st
Raúl Ibañez†*	1	0.3%	–	1st
Brad Penny†*	1	0.3%	–	1st
J. J. Putz†*	1	0.3%	–	1st
Josh Beckett†*	0	0%	–	1st
Heath Bell†*	0	0%	–	1st
Chone Figgins†*	0	0%	–	1st
Rafael Furcal†*	0	0%	–	1st
Carlos Peña†*	0	0%	–	1st
Brian Roberts†*	0	0%	–	1st
José Valverde†*	0	0%	–	1st

Key
	Elected to the Hall of Fame on this ballot (named in **bold italics**).
	Elected subsequently, as of 2026 (named in plain italics).
	Renominated for the 2021 BBWAA election by adequate performance on this ballot and has not subsequently been eliminated.
	Eliminated from annual BBWAA consideration by poor performance or expiration on subsequent ballots.
	Eliminated from annual BBWAA consideration by poor performance or expiration on this ballot.
†	First time on the BBWAA ballot.
*	Eliminated from annual BBWAA consideration by poor performance on this ballot (not expiration).

Players who met first-year eligibility requirements but were not selected by the screening committee for inclusion on the ballot included: Mike Adams, Jason Bartlett, Erik Bedard, John Buck, Shawn Camp, Ronny Cedeño, Endy Chavez, Greg Dobbs, Ryan Doumit, Scott Downs, Mark Ellis, Kyle Farnsworth, Frank Francisco, Álex González, Matt Guerrier, Scott Hairston, Koyie Hill, Maicer Izturis, Jason Kubel, Brandon League, Ryan Ludwick, Paul Maholm, John McDonald, Nate McLouth, José Molina, Xavier Nady, Miguel Olivo, Lyle Overbay, Nick Punto, Humberto Quintero, Guillermo Quiroz, Ramón Santiago, Joe Saunders, Marco Scutaro, Luis Valbuena, (Note: Valbuena died on December 6, 2018. Due to having already played at least 10 seasons at the time of his death, he was eligible for inclusion on the ballot six months after his death.) Josh Willingham and Jamey Wright.

The Hall itself apparently treated Jeter's induction as a foregone conclusion; since shortly after Jeter's retirement, it maintained a page on its official website that included the following statement:

While nothing is ever assured when it comes to election to the National Baseball Hall of Fame (after all, it is the responsibility of the Baseball Writers’ Association of America to vote on each year’s candidates), who among us would doubt that Jeter is a sure-fire first-ballot choice when he becomes eligible in 2020?

The BBWAA announced the results of its 2020 Hall of Fame balloting on January 21, 2020.

== Modern Baseball Era Committee ==
On July 23, 2016, the Hall of Fame announced changes to the Era Committee system. The system's timeframes were restructured to place a greater emphasis on the modern game, and to reduce the frequency at which individuals from the pre-1970 game (including Negro league baseball figures) will have their careers reviewed. Considering candidates whose greatest contributions occurred from 1970 to 1987, the Modern Baseball Era Committee met in 2019 as part of the elections for the next calendar year.

The Historical Overview Committee, which determined the Modern Baseball Era ballot in the fall, was composed of 11 veteran historians: Bob Elliott (Canadian Baseball Network); Jim Henneman (formerly Baltimore Sun); Rick Hummel (St. Louis Post-Dispatch); Steve Hirdt (formerly Elias Sports Bureau); Bill Madden (formerly New York Daily News); Jack O'Connell (BBWAA); Jim Reeves (formerly Fort Worth Star-Telegram); Tracy Ringolsby (InsideTheSeams.com); Glenn Schwarz (formerly San Francisco Chronicle); Dave van Dyck (formerly Chicago Tribune); and Mark Whicker (Los Angeles News Group).

The cutoff for election to the Hall of Fame remained the standard 75%; as the Modern Baseball Era Committee consisted of 16 members, 12 votes was the minimum for selection. The 16-member Hall of Fame Board-appointed electorate charged with the review of the Modern Baseball Era featured Hall of Fame members George Brett, Rod Carew, Dennis Eckersley, Eddie Murray, Ozzie Smith and Robin Yount; major league executives Sandy Alderson, Dave Dombrowski, David Glass, Walt Jocketty, Doug Melvin and Terry Ryan; and veteran media members/historians Bill Center, Steve Hirdt, Jack O’Connell and Tracy Ringolsby.

The 2019 vote elected former catcher Ted Simmons, and Major League Baseball Players Association (MLBPA) leader Marvin Miller, who died in 2012. Simmons and Miller each received at least 75% of the votes, earning election to the Hall of Fame. Those not elected remain potential candidates for the next Modern Era Committee ballot for 2023.

Candidate	Category	Votes	Percent
Ted Simmons	Player	13	81.25%
Marvin Miller	Executive	12	75%
Dwight Evans	Player	8	50%
Dave Parker	Player	7	43.75%
Steve Garvey	Player	6	37.5%
Lou Whitaker	Player	6	37.5%
Tommy John	Player	<3	
Don Mattingly	Player	<3	
Thurman Munson	Player	<3	
Dale Murphy	Player	<3	

The prior Modern Baseball Era Committee balloting in 2018 selected Jack Morris and Alan Trammell to the Hall of Fame. Considered, but not elected, on that ballot were players Steve Garvey, Tommy John, Don Mattingly, Dale Murphy, Dave Parker, Luis Tiant, and Simmons. Also on that ballot was Miller, the former leader of the MLBPA. Of those eight, Simmons came within one vote (11) of being elected, while Miller had seven votes; the other six candidates each received less than seven votes, as their vote totals were not released to the public.

== J. G. Taylor Spink Award ==
The J. G. Taylor Spink Award has been presented by the BBWAA at the annual summer induction ceremonies since 1962. Through 2010, it was awarded during the main induction ceremony, but is now given the previous day at the Hall of Fame Awards Presentation. It recognizes a sportswriter "for meritorious contributions to baseball writing". The recipients are not members of the Hall of Fame but are featured in a permanent exhibit at the National Baseball Museum.

The three finalists for the 2020 award were announced on July 9, 2019, during the All-Star break:

- Nick Cafardo, The Boston Globe
- Jim Reeves, Fort Worth Star-Telegram
- Patrick Reusse, Star Tribune (Minneapolis)

Of the finalists, only Cafardo was deceased at the time of the announcement. Reeves and Reusse had both been finalists in 2018 and 2019; Reeves had also been a finalist in 2017. On December 10, 2019, Cafardo was named the 2020 award recipient.

Receiving the Spink Award entitles a baseball writer to eligibility for the Historical Oversight Committee, which selects the 10 candidates to be voted on by the applicable 16 member Eras Committee of the Hall of Fame. The number of Spink Award recipients who choose to participate on an Oversight Committee varies according to the interest and availability of these generally retired sports writers. Given that the 2017 and 2020 awards went to deceased writers, it is possible that only one new member, (Sheldon Ocker, 2018), will sit on the committee which meets in 2020 to make up the ballot to be considered by the 2020/21 Golden Age Era Committee.

== Ford C. Frick Award ==
Various changes in July 2016 were also made to the annual Ford C. Frick Award elections, presented annually to a preeminent baseball broadcaster since 1978. According to the Hall, the new criteria for selection are "Commitment to excellence, quality of broadcasting abilities, reverence within the game, popularity with fans, and recognition by peers."

Additionally, a ballot of eight candidates is now set, down from 10 in years past. The three ballot slots previously determined by fan voting on Facebook are now filled by a committee of historians.

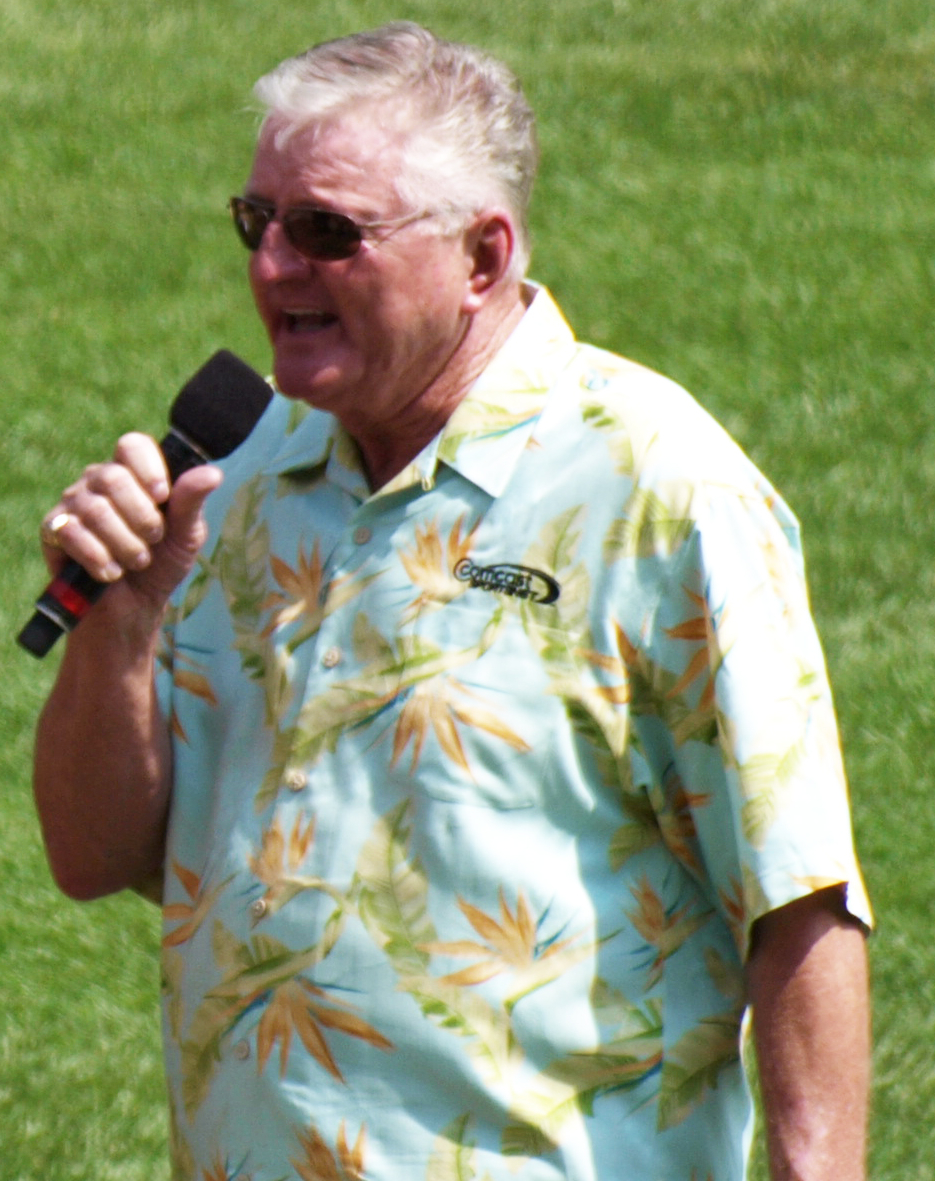
Ken Harrelson in 2010

A new election cycle has been established, rotating annually between Current Major League Markets (team-specific announcers) with the 2017 Frick Award; National Voices (broadcasters whose contributions were realized on a national level) with the 2018 Frick Award; and Broadcasting Beginnings (early team voices and pioneers of baseball broadcasting) with the 2019 Frick Award. Since this cycle repeats every three years, all finalists for the 2020 award were team-specific announcers.

The Hall announced finalists for the 2020 Ford C. Frick Award on November 1, 2019. Of the finalists, the only one not living at that time was Ned Martin, who died in 2002. Ken "Hawk" Harrelson was announced as the winner on December 11.

- Joe Castiglione (Boston Red Sox)
- Jacques Doucet (Montreal Expos)
- Tom Hamilton (Cleveland Indians)
- Ken Harrelson (Chicago White Sox)
- Pat Hughes (Chicago Cubs)
- Ned Martin (Boston Red Sox)
- Mike Shannon (St. Louis Cardinals)
- Dewayne Staats (Tampa Bay Rays)

== Buck O'Neil Lifetime Achievement Award ==
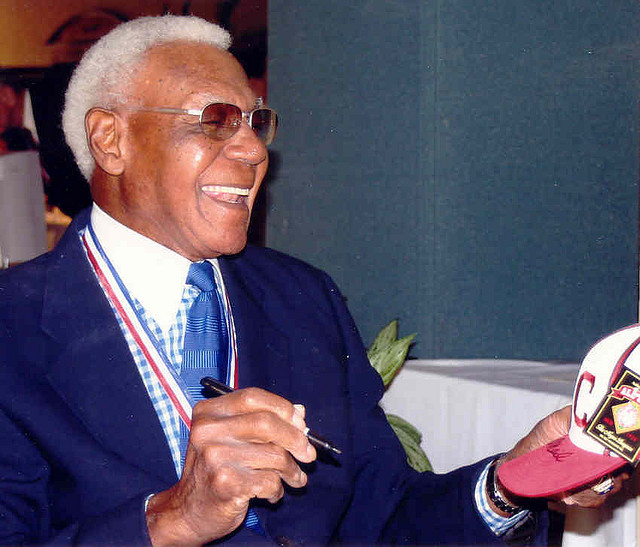
Buck O'Neil in 2005

Another Hall of Fame honor, the Buck O'Neil Lifetime Achievement Award, will be presented at the 2020 Awards Presentation. The award was created in 2008 in honor of Buck O'Neil, a Negro leagues star who went on to become one of baseball's leading ambassadors until his death in 2006. The first award was presented posthumously to O'Neil at the 2008 induction ceremony, and has since been presented three additional times, most recently to Rachel Robinson in 2017. According to the Hall,

The Buck O'Neil Lifetime Achievement Award is presented by the Hall of Fame's Board of Directors not more than once every three years to honor an individual whose extraordinary efforts enhanced baseball's positive impact on society, broadened the game's appeal, and whose character, integrity and dignity are comparable to the qualities exhibited by O'Neil.

On March 5, 2020, the Hall announced David Montgomery as the 2020 recipient. Before his death in 2019, Montgomery had worked in the Philadelphia Phillies organization for over 40 years, starting in the sales office staff and eventually becoming CEO and part-owner. After his retirement from full-time executive work in 2015, he served as the franchise's largely ceremonial chairman. During his career with the Phillies, he played a major role in the team's community service efforts, both in the Philadelphia metropolitan area and in the areas of its minor-league teams.

As with the media awards, recipients are not members of the Hall of Fame but are permanently recognized by the Hall. In this case, the recipients are listed alongside a life-size statue of O'Neil that stands at the entrance to the museum. Written nominations for the award are accepted by mail at any time; the nomination must specifically state how the nominee meets the traits exemplified by O'Neil.
