= Injured list =

List of injured baseball players

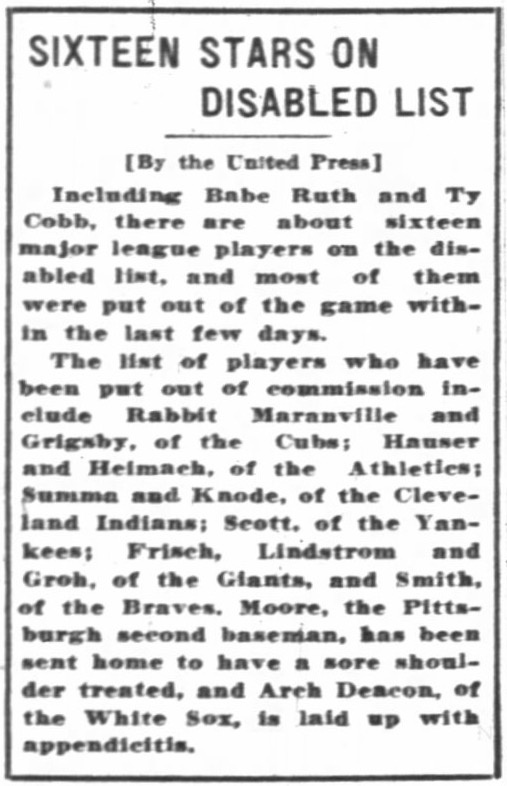
An April 1925 newspaper article about players on baseball's "disabled list", as the injured list was then known

In Major League Baseball (MLB), the injured list (IL) is a method for teams to remove their injured players from the roster in order to summon healthy players. Before the 2019 season, it was known as the disabled list (DL).

== General guidelines ==
Players are placed on the 10-day/15-day injured list or the 60-day injured list, usually depending on the severity and/or recovery time of the injury. By rule, position players must spend a minimum of 10 days on the injured list while pitchers must spend a minimum of 15 days on the IL. The 15-day period was the standard for all players prior to 2017 when the period was shortened to 10 days. The minimum period was restored to 15 days for pitchers and two-way players for the 2020 season, though the full implementation of the rule was pushed back to May 2022 due to the COVID-19 pandemic and the 2021–22 Major League Baseball lockout.

Placing a player on the injured list opens a spot on the active roster. Another player from the minor leagues, free agent pool, a traded player, or a recovered player coming off the injured list may be used to fill this spot. This allows a team to avoid the disadvantage of playing with an incapacitated player on the bench.

A player on the 10-day/15-day injured list does not count toward the active roster, but does keep that player as part of the team's expanded 40-man roster, whereas a player on the 60-day injured list does not count towards either the team's active roster or its 40-man roster; however, a team's 40-man roster must be full in order for the option of a placement on the 60-day injured list to be available. A player may be shifted from the 10-day/15-day injured list to the 60-day injured list at any time, but not vice versa.

The rule about rejoining the active roster only applies to eligibility to play in a game. Players are permitted to stay with the team and attend games, though players may leave the team to focus on treatment, to avoid traveling with the team on a road trip, or for short term minor-league rehabilitation assignments to prepare for their return to the active roster.

Alternatively, instead of placing a slightly injured player on the injured list, a team may elect to keep him on the roster but list him as 'day-to-day' to indicate that the medical staff is unable to determine when the player can resume full playing activities. If the injury turns out to be minor, then the player may resume playing immediately without having to serve the minimum term on the injured list. This also allows a valuable, slightly injured player to continue to contribute in a limited role, such as pinch hitting. However, depending upon the circumstances, the team may find itself effectively shorthanded in the meantime.

Retroactive placement on the IL may be made a maximum of three days before the player is placed on the IL so long as he has not appeared in a game since the retroactive date. This allows a club to defer the decision to place a player on the injured list until more information can be learned about the extent and impact of the injury.

Starting with the 2011 season, Major League Baseball instituted a new, shorter injured list: a 7-day injured list specifically for concussions. The idea is to prevent long-term brain damage which may take up to seven days by current standards, without having to serve the minimum duration (10 days or 15 days) on the regular IL. A player who remains on the concussion injured list for an extended duration is automatically transferred to the 10-day/15-day injured list as applicable.

Players recovering from an injury may appear in a limited number of minor-league games while still on the injured list in order to prepare for reactivation. Pitchers may play on a minor-league club for up to 30 days; position players for up to 20 days.

=== Paternity list ===
Also in 2011, Major League Baseball instituted a paternity list. This allows a team to replace a player who is an expectant father for 1–3 days on the roster to be available for the birth of his child.

=== Bereavement list ===
A player may be placed on the bereavement list upon attending to a seriously ill member in the player's immediate family or to a death in the player's immediate family or spouse's immediate family. The bereavement list may span from a minimum of three to a maximum of seven games. Umpiring's bereavement list for death in the immediate family may span up to a full season.

== Minor League Baseball ==
Minor League Baseball uses a 7-day injured list, with players on this list counting toward a parent major league club's domestic reserve list limit, as well as 60-day and full-season injured lists, players on which do not count against a major league team's domestic reserve list limit. Players who are on the 40-man roster but become injured while on optional assignment with a minor league team are placed on the minor league IL, but not on the major league IL. One problem this poses is that a player who is injured in the minors and who would be placed on the major league 60-day IL cannot be placed on the 60-day, meaning the 40-man roster spot is not freed up. The exception to this would be if a team recalled the player and immediately put the player on the Major League 60-day IL. This would free up the 40-man roster spot, but in exchange the player would accumulate service time and a Major League salary he would not otherwise receive if on the Minor League IL.

A free roster spot on an MLB club can be strategically valuable, leading to occasional creative use of injured lists by MLB teams and their minor league affiliates (similar to teams strategically appealing or dropping an appeal of a disciplinary suspension, in order align the timing of the sentence to optimize player contribution). Poor performing, slightly injured players might be put on the IL to be assigned to the minors for rehab, when the MLB club might really want them reassigned primarily because of performance, but might not otherwise be able to reassign them due to service time, lack of options, contract stipulations, etc. The Collective Bargaining Agreement between the players and the league contains rules against blatantly "gaming the system."

=== Development list ===
Minor League Baseball also has a development list, which does not exist in MLB. Players may only be placed on this list for development or conditioning reasons, not for injury rehabilitation or disciplinary reasons. Such players cannot compete in games, but can remain with the team and can optionally act as a bullpen catcher, batting practice pitcher, or coach. Players must be placed on this list for a minimum of seven days.

== History ==
The term "disabled list" was used as far back as 1887, and was common terminology in MLB for over 100 years until being changed to the current "injured list" prior to the 2019 season. The name was changed after MLB was requested to do so by disability advocates, and also allows the term to be consistent with other professional sports that use an "injured reserve list". Players on the "injured list" are not necessarily injured, some being ill or unable to play for other reasons.

The categories and variety of disabled lists have changed numerous times over the years. The 15-day disabled list was introduced in 1966, joining 10-day, 21-day and 30-day options, and the 60-day disabled list in 1990. Prior to 1990, the number of players who could be placed on each list was limited, players with major league contracts were not allowed to go to the minor leagues for rehabilitation, and there was less flexibility about when they could return to action. The 10-day disabled list was dropped in 1984 but restored for the 2017 season (replacing the 15-day option), and the 21-day and 30-day options were dropped in 1990 with the introduction of the 60-day disabled list.

== See also ==
- Injured reserve list
