= Tony Clark =

American baseball player and union leader (born 1972)

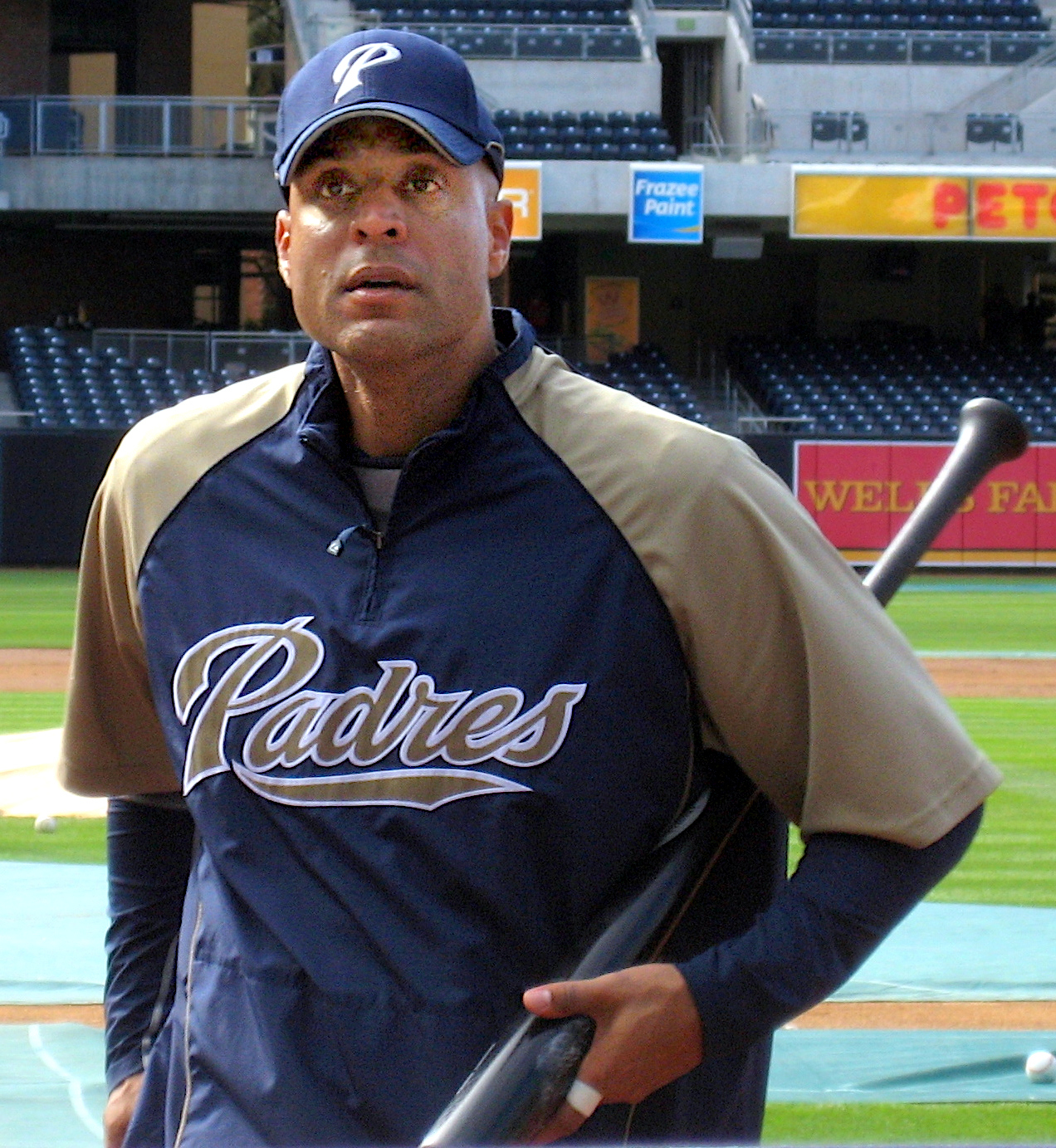
- Clark with the San Diego Padres in 2008
- First baseman
- Born: June 15, 1972 (age 53); Newton, Kansas, U.S.
- Batted: Switch Threw: Right

MLB debut
- September 3, 1995, for the Detroit Tigers

Last MLB appearance
- July 12, 2009, for the Arizona Diamondbacks

MLB statistics
- Batting average: .262
- Home runs: 251
- Runs batted in: 824
- Stats at Baseball Reference

Teams
- Detroit Tigers (1995–2001); Boston Red Sox (2002); New York Mets (2003); New York Yankees (2004); Arizona Diamondbacks (2005–2007); San Diego Padres (2008); Arizona Diamondbacks (2008–2009)

Career highlights and awards
- All-Star (2001)

Anthony Christopher Clark (born June 15, 1972) is an American former professional baseball player and union leader. He played in Major League Baseball as a first baseman from 1995 to 2009 and was the sixth executive director of the Major League Baseball Players Association (MLBPA), a position he held from 2013 to 2026.

Clark had his best years with the Detroit Tigers (1995–2001), but also played on the Boston Red Sox, New York Mets, New York Yankees, Arizona Diamondbacks, and San Diego Padres during a 15-year career that ended in 2009. He was a switch hitter, and threw right-handed. He was third in Rookie of the Year voting in 1996, and was an All Star in 2001.

Clark was a union representative while he was a player, and after retiring he joined the staff of the MLBPA in 2010. He served as deputy executive director and acting executive director of the union before he was appointed executive director in December 2013, upon the death of Michael Weiner. Clark was the first former player to be executive director of the MLBPA.

== Amateur career ==
Clark prepped at Valhalla High School in El Cajon, California, but after going out to dinner with principal Ed Giles and others, Clark transferred to nearby Christian High School. He averaged 43.7 points per game in basketball in his senior season.

Clark played college basketball at the University of Arizona and San Diego State University, where he was the San Diego State Aztecs' top scorer with 11.5 points per game in 1991–92. Clark left college (and ended his basketball career) without finishing his business administration degree in order to focus on baseball.

== Professional baseball career ==
In a 15-year career, Clark hit .262 with 251 home runs and 824 runs batted in (RBIs) in 1,559 games played.

=== Detroit Tigers ===
The Detroit Tigers selected Clark out of high school with the second overall pick in the 1990 MLB draft. He played in Minor League Baseball while attending college and playing college basketball.

Clark made his major league debut as the Tigers starting first baseman against the Cleveland Indians on September 3, 1995. He had two hits in five at-bats in the game, with his first major league hit coming off Julián Tavárez in the ninth inning. He appeared in 27 games that season, batting .238 with three home runs. His first major league home run was hit off Jeff Ware of the Toronto Blue Jays on September 8. Clark finished in third in Rookie of the Year voting in 1996 when he hit .250 with 27 home runs.

His most productive seasons were 1997, with 32 HRs and 117 RBIs (10 errors at first base), 1998, with 34 HRs and 103 RBIs (13 errors at first), and 1999, with 31 HRs and 99 RBIs (10 errors at first).

Clark was selected an All-Star in 2001.

=== Boston Red Sox and New York Mets ===
With Clark eligible for salary arbitration and expected to earn $7 million for the 2002 season, the Tigers placed Clark on waivers, and he was claimed by the Boston Red Sox. In 2002, Clark hit only .207 with 29 RBIs and three HRs for Boston in 90 games, with a career-low .291 slugging percentage. A free agent after the 2002 season, Clark signed a one-year contract with the New York Mets for the 2003 season. In 2003, he batted .232 for the Mets.

=== New York Yankees ===
Signed as a bench player, Clark filled in for the New York Yankees in 2004 after Jason Giambi was forced out of the lineup because of an injury, though he was replaced as the main first baseman by John Olerud late in the season. During an August 28 game, Clark hit a career-high three home runs in an 18–6 rout of the Blue Jays in Toronto.

=== Arizona Diamondbacks ===
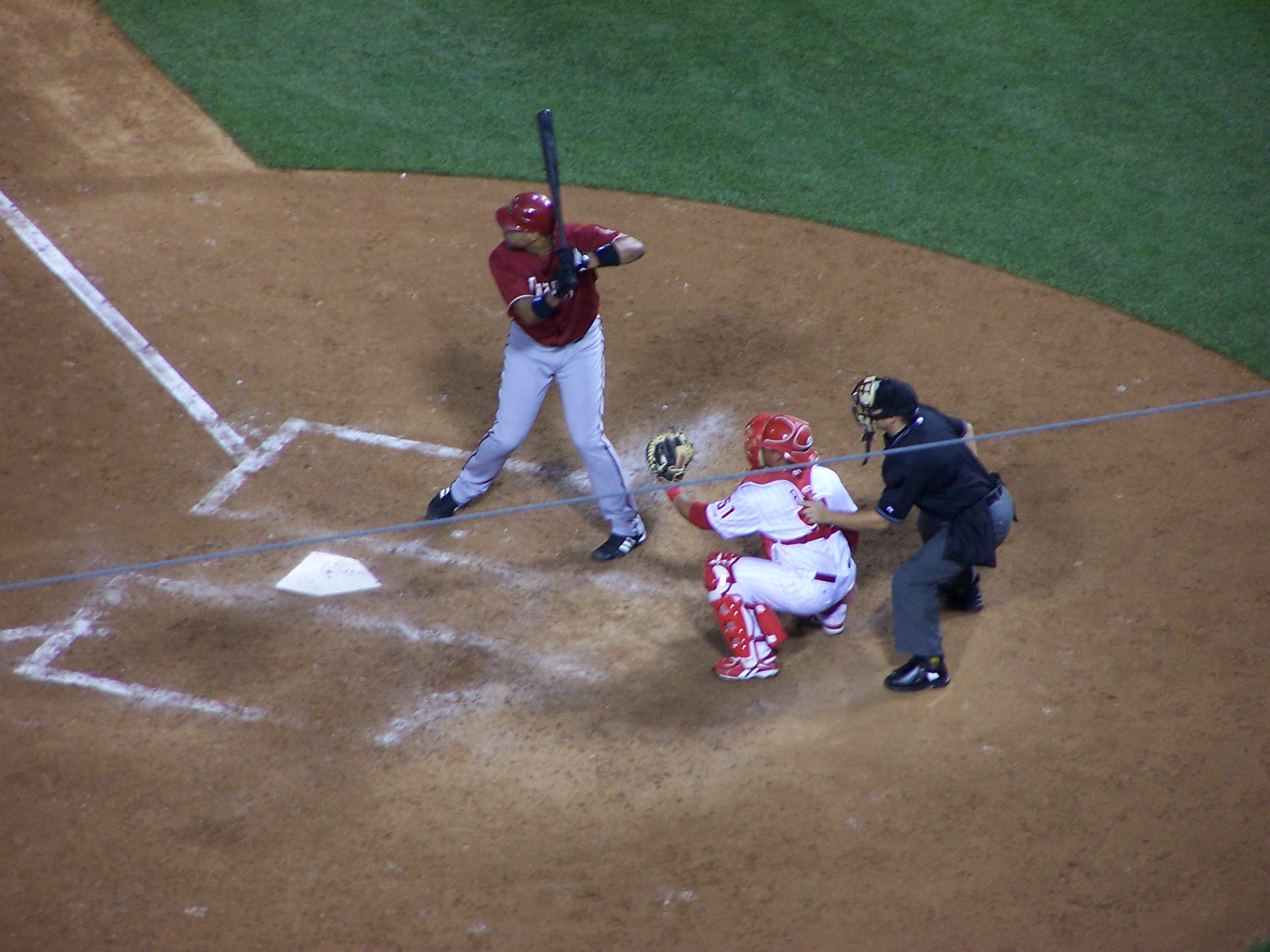
Clark with the Diamondbacks in 2007

Clark signed with the Arizona Diamondbacks after the 2004 season. In a limited role (349 at bats) in the 2005 season, he hit .307 with 30 home runs, and 87 RBIs.

In 2006, Clark was injured for most of the season. Although he tried to play through a shoulder injury that required significant surgery to repair, he batted a career-low .197, with a career-low .279 on-base percentage, in 132 at-bats. He struggled especially against right-handers, batting .125 against them. In 2007, Clark shared first base with Conor Jackson. He played in 113 games and batted .249.

=== San Diego Padres ===
After the season, his contract was up and on February 10, 2008, Clark agreed to a one-year contract worth $900,000 with the San Diego Padres. On July 17, 2008, he was traded back to the Diamondbacks for minor league pitcher Evan Scribner. In order to complete the trade, Clark waived a clause under his contract with the Padres pursuant to which he was to receive $500,000 from the Padres if traded.

In 2008, between the two teams, Clark batted .225 with a .318 slugging percentage. Clark struck out more than a third of the time, with 55 strikeouts in 151 at-bats. He struggled especially against right-handers, batting .198 against them.

=== Return to Arizona ===
Clark filed for free agency after the 2008 season. On January 2, 2009, he signed a one-year deal worth $800,000 to remain with the Diamondbacks.

Clark had a startling good performance on Opening Day 2009, hitting 2 home runs to lead the D-Backs to a victory over the Colorado Rockies; fellow switch-hitting teammate Felipe López also homered from both sides of the plate in the same game, making them the first teammates to do so on an Opening Day.

Clark slumped badly thereafter, however, as in his next 18 at-bats he only managed to eke out a single. As of May 6 he was batting .179, and had struck out in more than half his at bats. That day Clark was placed on the 15-day disabled list for a lingering wrist ligament injury, and Josh Whitesell, who was hitting .356 for the Reno Aces with a .477 on-base percentage, was called up to the Diamondbacks to take his place. Clark suffered the injury during spring training, and re-aggravated it in late April, leaving him unable to swing comfortably from the left side. It was anticipated that the injury could require more than 15 days to heal.

On June 19 Clark came off the disabled list and returned to Arizona (after a rehab assignment at Reno in which he batted .160, and during which he turned 37), and Whitesell was optioned back to Reno (after batting .300 with a .447 on-base percentage in his second stint with the team). In his first game back with the team, Clark went 0–3 with 2 strikeouts to bring his batting average down to .161, with strikeouts in 55% of his at bats for the season.

Clark struggled on defense as well, as on June 21 in his second game back he dropped a throw to him at first base with two outs in the ninth, allowing the winning run to score for Seattle. The play left players and managers on both sides stunned and speechless. "It's a miserable ending to a rough road trip", manager A. J. Hinch said. His resulting .973 fielding percentage was last among major league first basemen who had played 60 or more innings.

On July 12, 2009, the Diamondbacks released Clark, who was hitting .182 with four home runs and 11 RBIs. They replaced him with Whitesell. Clark said he would continue to work out the next few weeks in the event an opportunity might arise with another team, and that if he didn't land with another team he'd consider broadcasting and coaching, perhaps with the Diamondbacks. Diamondbacks General Manager Josh Byrnes expressed an interest in keeping him with the organization, and Clark said he "would welcome the opportunity".

=== Post-season ===
Clark played in four post-season series through 2008, two each for the Yankees and the Diamondbacks. In aggregate, he batted .135, with a .158 on-base percentage and a .189 slugging percentage, and drove in one run in 37 at-bats.

== MLB Players Association ==
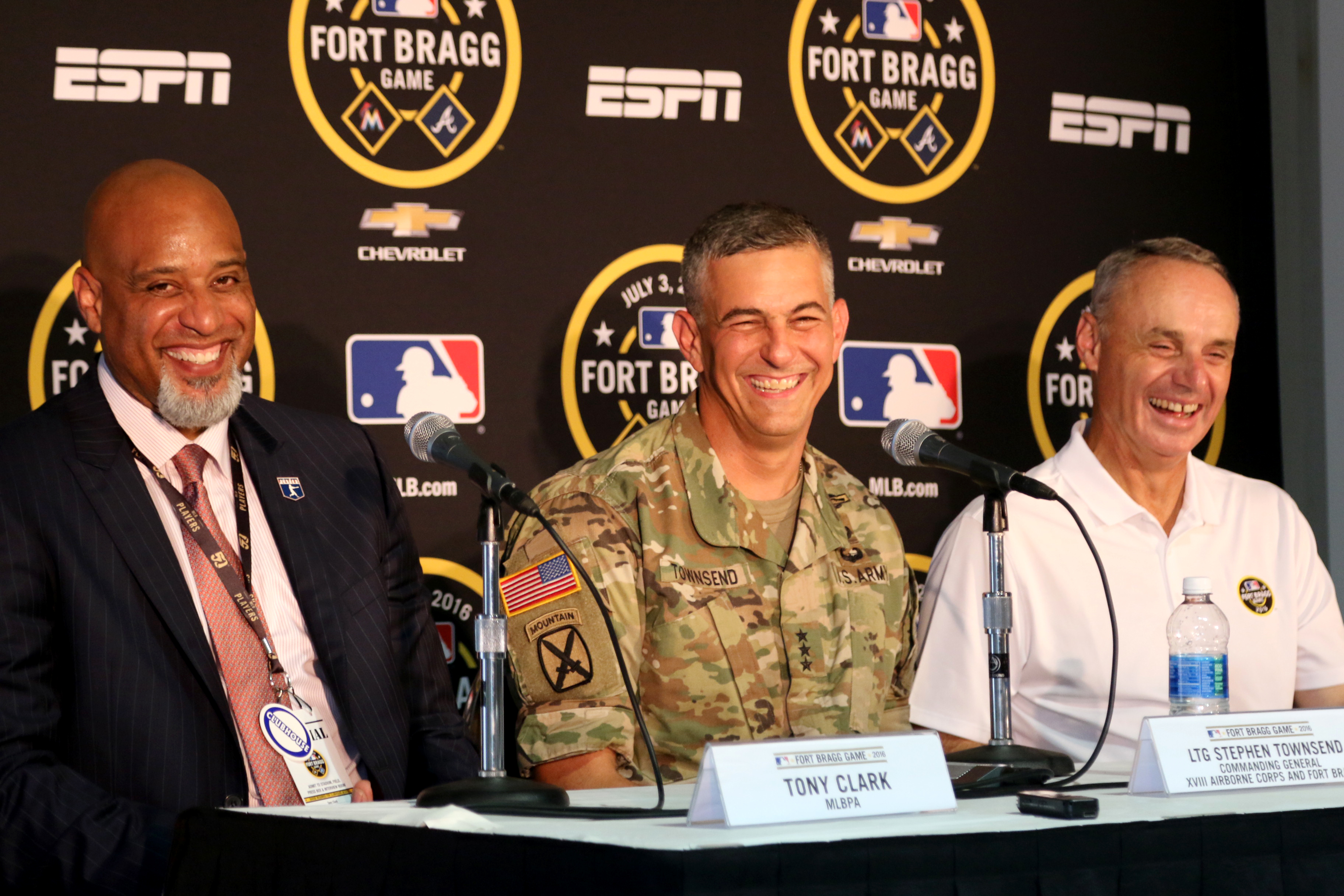
Clark (left), Lt. Gen. Stephen J. Townsend (center), and Rob Manfred (right) before the Fort Bragg Game in 2016

Throughout his playing career, Clark was involved in the Major League Baseball Players Association (MLBPA) on various levels. He attended an executive board meeting for the first time in 1999 and was a team player representative and association representative for several seasons following. He was an active participant in the union's collective bargaining in 2002 and 2006 and in negotiations regarding Major League Baseball's drug policy. In March 2010, Clark was hired to be the MLBPA's Director of Player Relations.

It was reported in April 2013 that Clark was close to earning a degree in history and planned to potentially pursue a Juris Doctor degree. Following the death of Michael Weiner, Clark was unanimously voted executive director of Major League Baseball Players Association in December 2013. He became the first former major league player to hold the position.

Clark led the MLBPA negotiations during the 2021–22 MLB lockout.

During the 2022 season, Clark and the MLBPA worked to unionize minor league baseball players. In September 2022, the MLBPA joined the AFL-CIO. After the 2022 season, the MLBPA extended Clark's contract by five years.

Clark resigned from his position with the players association on February 17, 2026, after an internal investigation revealed that he had an inappropriate relationship with his sister-in-law, who worked for the union.

== Nickname ==
During his time in Detroit, fans and the media gave Clark the nickname "Tony the Tiger". The nickname came from the Frosted Flakes mascot Tony the Tiger and that he was a member of the Detroit Tigers.

== Personal life ==
Clark and his wife, Frances, have one son. They reside in Phoenix, Arizona, having previously lived in New York.

Clark's brother, Greg, played college basketball at Long Beach State and Washington. Their father played three sports at Bethel College in Kansas.

== See also ==
- List of Major League Baseball career home run leaders
