= Bruce Meyer (lawyer) =

American attorney

Bruce S. Meyer is an American attorney and is the interim executive director of the Major League Baseball Players Association (MLBPA).

Meyer is from Long Island and grew up as a fan of the New York Mets. He graduated from the University of Pennsylvania in 1983 and from the Boston University School of Law in 1986. He joined Weil, Gotshal & Manges and worked there for 30 years.

Meyer joined the National Hockey League Players' Association in 2018. He was hired by the MLBPA in 2019. He was promoted to deputy executive director in July 2022. After Tony Clark resigned as executive director of the MLBPA in February 2026, Meyer was unanimously selected as his successor.
