= Nick Cafardo =

American sportswriter and sports author (1956–2019)

- Cafardo at Fenway Park
- Born: May 8, 1956; Weymouth, Massachusetts, U.S.
- Died: February 21, 2019 (aged 62); Fort Myers, Florida, U.S.
- Education: Suffolk University
- Occupations: Sportswriter, author
- Years active: 1981–2019
- Known for: Boston Red Sox coverage
- Spouse: Leeanne (m. 1979)
- Children: 2
- Awards: J. G. Taylor Spink Award (2020)

Nicholas Dominic Cafardo (May 8, 1956 – February 21, 2019) was an American sportswriter and sports author. A longtime columnist and beat reporter for The Boston Globe, he primarily covered the Boston Red Sox. In December 2019, Cafardo was named the J. G. Taylor Spink Award recipient for 2020.

== Early life ==
Cafardo was born in Weymouth, Massachusetts; his parents were immigrants from Italy. He grew up in Hanson, Massachusetts, and graduated from Whitman-Hanson Regional High School. Cafardo attended Northeastern University before graduating from Suffolk University. He was inducted into the Whitman-Hanson hall of fame in 1993.

== Career ==
Cafardo got his start covering local news for The Enterprise of Brockton, Massachusetts, and sports for The Patriot Ledger of Quincy, Massachusetts, before moving to The Boston Globe in 1989. He was hired at the Globe at the suggestion of Will McDonough. Cafardo covered the New England Patriots for the Globe when he wasn't covering the Red Sox. His "Sunday Baseball Notes" column in the Globe was nationally read.

Cafardo was the author of several books on sports. He wrote The Impossible Team: The Worst to First Patriots’ Super Bowl Season (2002), Boston Red Sox: Yesterday and Today (2007), and 100 Things Red Sox Fans Should Know and Do Before They Die (2008). With Tom Glavine, he wrote None But the Braves: A Pitcher, a Team, a Champion (1996) and Inside Pitch: Playing and Broadcasting the Game I Love (2016), while with Jerry Remy, he wrote If These Walls Could Talk (2019).

In 2001, Cafardo joined New England Sports Network (NESN) as an analyst for the Red Sox, and contributed to NESN reports covering the team.

Cafardo was co-recipient of the Massachusetts Sportswriter of the Year award in 2014, shared with colleague Kevin Dupont of the Globe. In January 2017, Cafardo received the Dave O'Hara Award from the Boston chapter of the Baseball Writers' Association of America (BBWAA), recognizing his long and meritorious service to BBWAA Boston.

On December 10, 2019, Cafardo was posthumously named the recipient of the 2020 J. G. Taylor Spink Award, given by the Baseball Writers' Association of America, for "meritorious contributions to baseball writing."

== Personal life ==
Cafardo and his wife, Leeanne, were married in 1979 and lived in Plymouth, Massachusetts. The couple had two children. His son, Ben, has worked as a senior communications director for ESPN. Cafardo died on February 21, 2019. He apparently suffered an embolism at JetBlue Park, and died at Gulf Coast Medical Center; both are in Fort Myers, Florida. In August 2019, the Red Sox honored Cafardo in a pregame ceremony at Fenway Park, which included his two grandchildren throwing out ceremonial first pitches.
