= 2021–22 Major League Baseball lockout =

2021 labor dispute in Major League Baseball

- Date: December 2, 2021 – March 10, 2022 (3 months, 1 week and 1 day)
- Location: United States; Canada
- Caused by: Expiration of the previous MLB collective bargaining agreement on December 1, 2021
- Result: Ratification of a new collective bargaining agreement on March 10, 2022; Postponement of Opening Day from March 31 to April 7; Rescheduling of the first two series of the season to later dates after originally being canceled; Shortened spring training; Second scheduled travel day in Division Series and League Championship Series removed

Parties
Major League Baseball Players Association (MLBPA)	Major League Baseball (MLB)

Lead figures
Tony Clark (MLBPA executive director); Bruce Meyer (chief negotiator)	Rob Manfred (MLB commissioner); Dan Halem (deputy commissioner)

The 2021–22 Major League Baseball lockout was the ninth work stoppage in Major League Baseball (MLB) history. It began at 12:01 a.m. EST on December 2, 2021, after MLB owners voted unanimously to enact a lockout upon the expiration of the 2016 collective bargaining agreement (CBA) between the league and the Major League Baseball Players Association (MLBPA). It ended on March 10, 2022, with the signing of a new agreement. Issues raised between the league and union involved compensation for young players and limitations on tanking to receive higher selections in the MLB draft.

On March 1, 2022, following over a week of daily negotiations between the two sides, and three months of on and off negotiations, MLB canceled the first two series of the regular season. MLB and the MLBPA reached an agreement on a new five-year CBA on March 10. The new CBA salvaged the full 162-game 2022 season by delaying Opening Day from March 31 to April 7, with originally canceled games to be made up during the season.

The 2021–22 lockout was the first MLB work stoppage since the 1994–95 strike and the first lockout of the players since 1990. This was the second interruption of regular season play in three seasons, with the 2020 season having been delayed and shortened in response to the COVID-19 pandemic.

== Background ==
Collective bargaining agreements (CBAs) between Major League Baseball (MLB) and the Major League Baseball Players Association (MLBPA), the labor union, business, and charitable foundation of MLB players, are typically ratified on a five-year basis, with the most recent CBA ratified on December 1, 2016. MLB and the Players Association operated under the terms of the CBA until 11:59 p.m. EST on December 1, 2021. The CBA affects all of the economic aspects of an MLB season, including the length of the season, the per diem that players may receive on a road trip, and the semantics of both free agency and salary arbitration. The most recent prior MLB work stoppage was a strike that lasted from 1994 to 1995 and resulted in the cancellation of the 1994 World Series. The last time the owners had initiated a lockout of the players was 1990. The most recent prior dispute between MLB and the players' union was in 2020, as players and teams debated how to restructure a season affected by the COVID-19 pandemic.

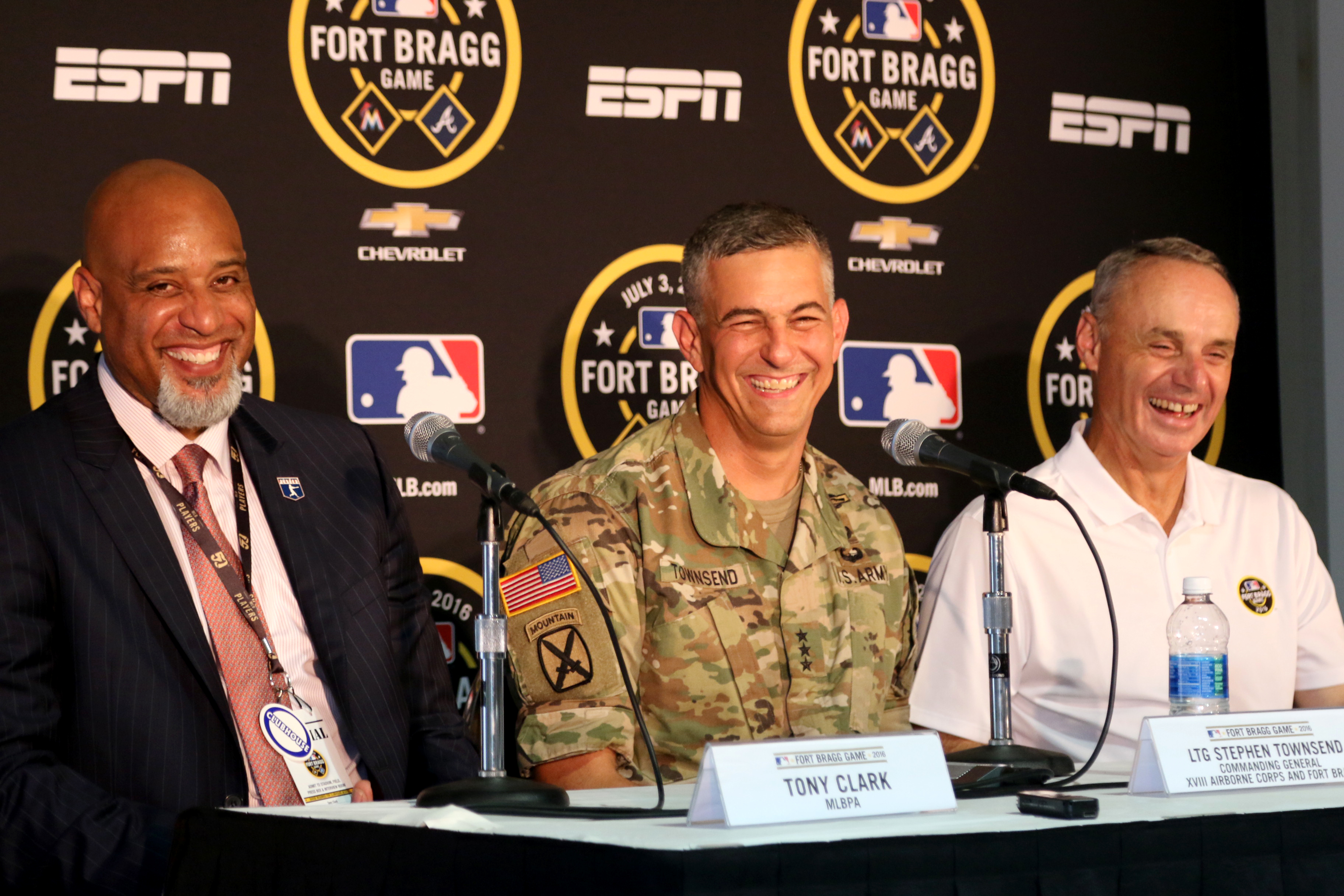
Tony Clark (left), executive director of the players' union, with Lt. Gen. Stephen J. Townsend (center) and Rob Manfred (right), the Commissioner of Baseball, in 2016

=== Player demands ===
In a November meeting, the MLBPA drafted a proposal for the upcoming CBA with a number of demands that would expand player control over the terms of their contract, particularly for younger players, who are under control of the team that drafts them for the first six years of their professional baseball career. Of particular concern to the players' union was the ongoing trend of tanking, in which teams trade or release productive players and become relatively inactive in free agency in the hopes that they will finish with a losing season and receive higher compensation in future MLB drafts. The union has argued that tanking reduces competitive integrity within MLB and incentivizes teams with no intention of winning games. MLBPA executive director Tony Clark also voiced a desire to create new systems that would increase compensation for talented young players, and the union vocally disapproved of implementing a salary cap.

=== Owners' proposal ===
MLB's first proposal for a 2021 CBA was aimed at establishing narrower ranges for each team's combined salary, with a hard minimum of US$100 million per team and an incremental luxury tax beginning at $180 million. As negotiations continued, owners made three separate proposals to the players' union, all of which were rejected, and which contained a number of concessions to player demands. These included eliminating the requirement for teams to lose a draft pick when signing a free agent who rejected their qualifying offer; a draft lottery modeled after that of the National Basketball Association; a universal designated hitter; and increases to both the player minimum salary and the competitive balance tax threshold. MLB was also seeking an expanded postseason for the 2022 season, which would allow 12 of the league's 30 teams to reach the playoffs, as opposed to the previous 10-team playoff field that was introduced in 2012.

== Negotiations ==
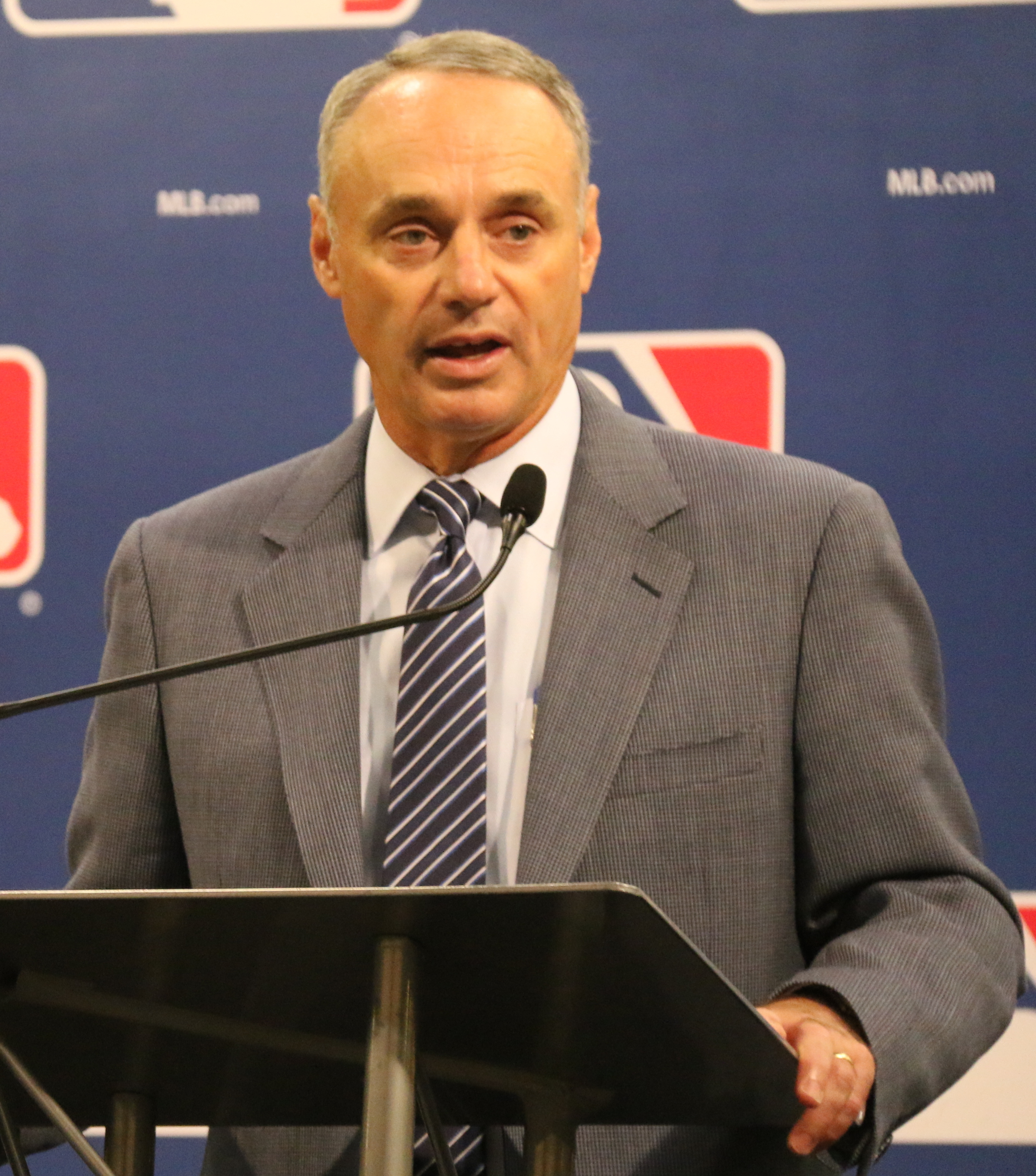
Rob Manfred, the Commissioner of Baseball

=== Pre-lockout ===
Many MLB teams, fearing the freeze in contract signings that would arise in a lockout, scrambled to sign prominent free agents at the end of November. More than $1.9 billion in new contracts were signed during the free agency period before the lockout, including a one-day record of $1.4 billion in contracts signed on December 1.

At 10:00 a.m. CST on November 30, 2021, one day before the CBA was set to expire, the MLBPA made its economic proposal to MLB at the Four Seasons hotel in Irving, Texas. MLB owners and negotiators then discussed the proposal independently, and both sides reconvened at 3:00 p.m. for additional negotiations. Talks resumed for seven minutes on the afternoon of December 1 before ending abruptly. The union rejected the league's proposal to drop certain demands, including alterations to the free agency process. Negotiations came to a halt when league representatives Dan Halem and Richard Monfort left the hotel. That evening, MLB owners voted unanimously to enact a lockout upon the expiration of the 2016 CBA.

=== December ===
The lockout officially began at 12:01 a.m. EST on December 2, 2021, announced via a press release from Rob Manfred, the Commissioner of Baseball. It instituted a transaction freeze, including the postponement of the major league portion of the Rule 5 draft. It was the first year since 1920 to not have a major league phase of the Rule 5 draft, though the minor league phase went ahead as scheduled.

As to not use their likenesses for commercial purposes absent a CBA, all official MLB properties removed imagery of active players, including player head shots, from their content upon its expiration. MLB.com (which had not yet launched at the time of the last lockout) was primarily publishing retrospective-based articles, while MLB Network eventually suspended all regular offseason studio programming in favor of only carrying documentaries and classic game broadcasts. As a show of solidarity, some players changed their avatars on social media accounts to the generic silhouette image being used on MLB.com.

=== January ===
The first meeting between the league and the players' union occurred over Zoom on January 13, 2022. The league offered a proposal which included pay increases for veteran players, performance bonuses, and several other changes on issues of tanking, expanding the playoff field, and use of a universal designated hitter. The MLBPA was unimpressed with the proposal, which explicitly did not address the issue of free agency eligibility and which prevented any player with fewer than three years of major league play from salary arbitration; previously, a select number of players who had spent two years in the league were eligible for arbitration.

The parties met again on January 24. The MLBPA rejected most of the terms put forth by the league during the January 13 meeting.

The parties met for a second consecutive day on January 25. The league increased its proposed minimum salary to $615,000.

=== February ===
The parties met for a fourth time on February 1. In a counter offer, the players association lowered the bonus pool money that would be awarded to exceptional pre-arbitration performers from $105 million to $100 million.

On February 3, the league requested a federal mediator to help resolve the lockout. The league also said they would not make a counter offer to the players association. One day later, the MLBPA rejected the league's request for a federal mediator.

On February 10, Manfred held a press conference, where he said that the league had "agreed" both to the implementation of a universal designated hitter and the elimination of draft-pick compensation for free agents who reject qualifying offers.

On February 18, the league announced that it had cancelled all spring training games through March 4.

MLB told the players' union on February 20 that the last day to come to an agreement and have the season start on time would be February 28 and that the games missed would not be made up.

==== Week of February 21 ====
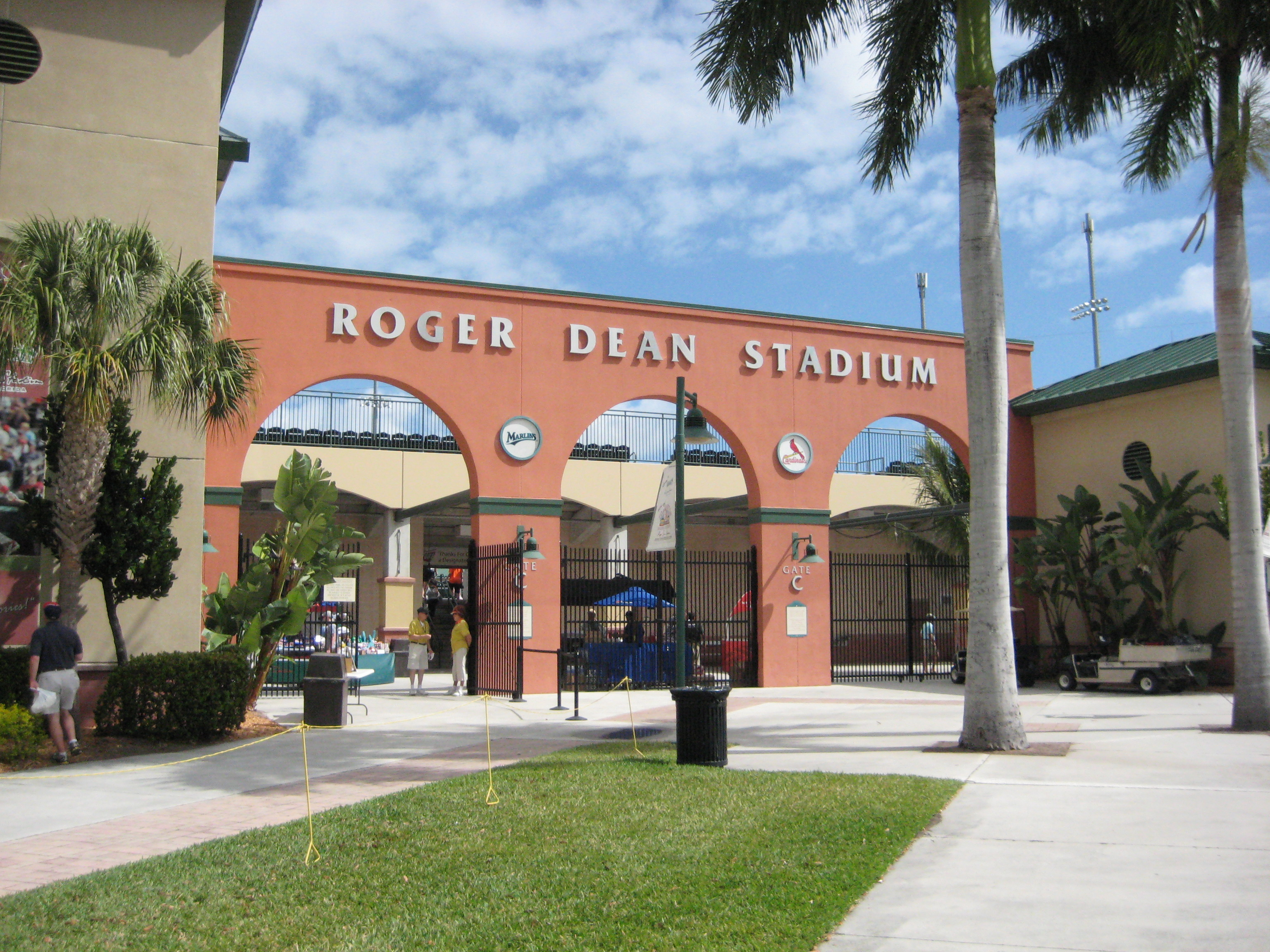
The final February negotiations took place at Roger Dean Stadium in Jupiter, Florida.

Beginning on February 21, in the final week before the league's self imposed deadline, the two sides began meeting every day in an attempt to start the regular season on time.

During the February 23 meeting, the league proposed a bump in the leaguewide minimum salary to $640,000 in the upcoming season. The minimum salary would raise by $10,000 per season for the rest of the CBA.

On February 25, the league announced they had cancelled all spring training games through March 7. The February 25 meeting focused on the format for the lottery determining the draft order.

During the February 26 meeting, the union made a proposal that addressed key monetary issues.

Monetary issues were further discussed during the February 27 meeting. While there were fewer formal proposals in this meeting, both sides felt it was productive.

On February 28, the two sides held a marathon negotiating session that continued until the early hours of March 1. The two sides agreed to a 12-team postseason, something that was previously thought to be a major point of strife. While the session did not end in an agreement between the two sides, both sides were reportedly optimistic that an agreement could be reached soon thereafter. The league decided to move its self-imposed deadline for cancelling regular season games to 5 p.m. EST on March 1.

Despite reports that the two sides were optimistic in coming to an agreement, they struggled to come to one during the March 1 meeting. During the negotiations, the league released statements to the press claiming that the union's tone had changed. The union, and several players on social media denied their tone had changed. The major disputes between the two parties centered around the luxury-tax thresholds, pre-arbitration bonus pool, and the minimum salary. The league made its "best and final offer" prior to the 5 p.m. deadline. The players were extremely disappointed with the offer, with one union official saying "We are done. This was always [the league's] plan." The union unanimously rejected the offer. The two sides then ended their negotiations. In a press conference immediately thereafter, commissioner Rob Manfred officially announced that the first two series of the regular season had been cancelled.

=== March ===
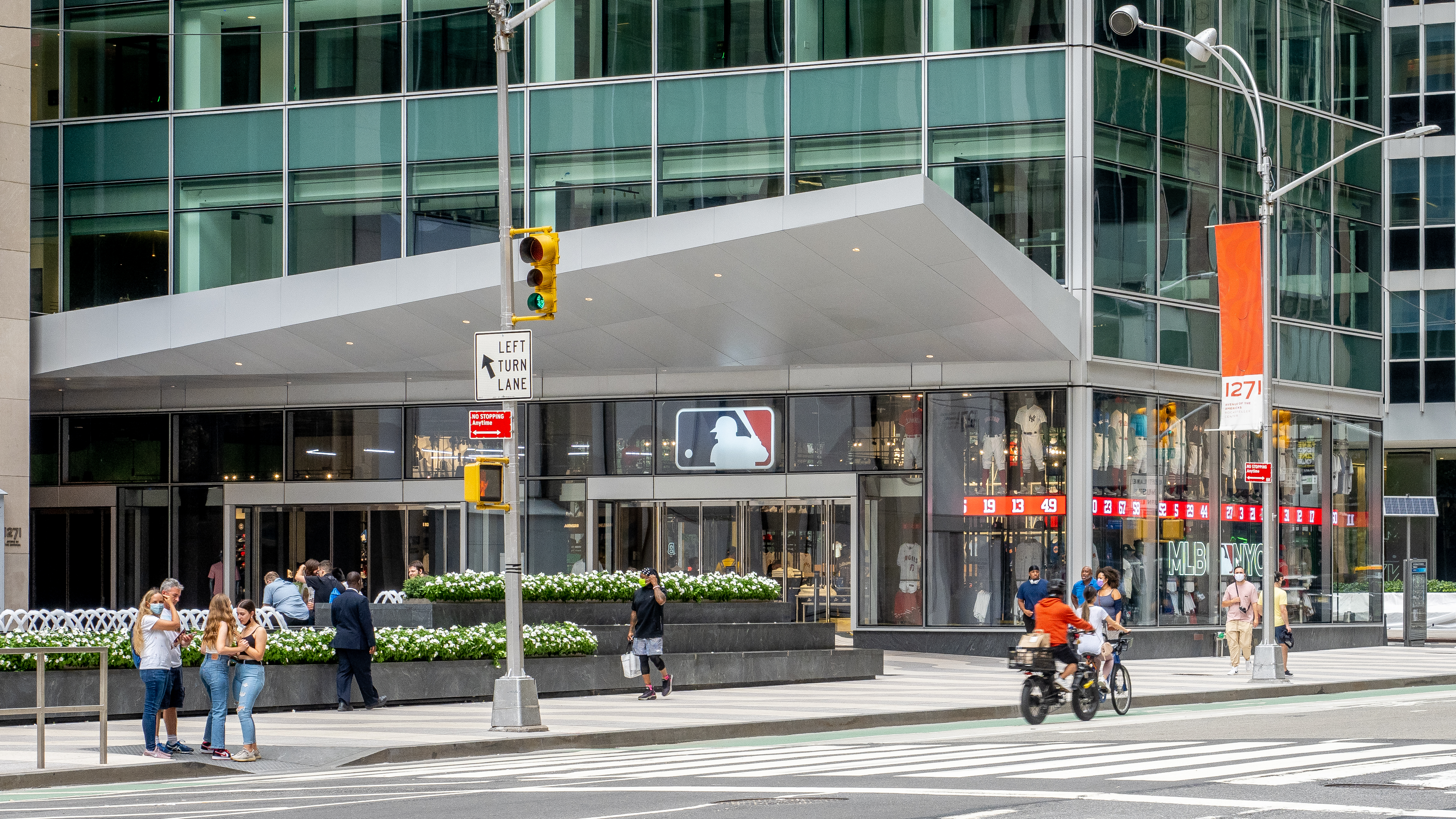
March negotiations took place at the MLB headquarters in New York City.

The two sides met again for an informal meeting on March 3. Unlike previous meetings, only two members of each side were in attendance, including MLB's Dan Halem and the MLBPA's Bruce Meyer. According to reports, no official proposals were made as the meeting was intended to map out further negotiations.

On March 4, Major League Baseball cancelled all spring training games through March 17.

The two sides met for a more formal meeting on March 6. The union did not change their proposals for the luxury tax thresholds, something that was reportedly a major disagreement between the two sides.

==== Week of March 7 ====
The lead negotiators for both sides met for another informal meeting on March 7.

The two sides met again formally on March 8. The league proposed an increase on the base luxury tax threshold to $230 million in 2022, rising to $242 million in 2026. The league also proposed a $50 million pre-arbitration bonus pool with no increases, $30 million short of the player association's request for $80 million with a $5 million increase per year. The league added several new facets to the proposal, including a third surcharge to the luxury tax, reportedly in response to New York Mets owner Steve Cohen's willingness to spend record-setting amounts on his team's payroll. Cohen reportedly was fine with the new surcharge if "MLB thought it was for the greater good." Other aspects of the new offer included a maximum of five options before a player is put on waivers. The league also proposed that "small-market" teams could only pick in the draft lottery for two consecutive years before being downgraded to the 10th overall pick, while "big-market" teams could only do so for one year. The threshold to qualify as a "small-market" or "big-market" team was not initially defined to the public. Under MLB's proposal, the top two vote-getters for each league's Rookie of the Year Award would receive a full year of service time. Negotiations continued into the early morning of March 9. The players association “requested to speak to its board again early tomorrow before coming back with a proposal.” The league moved its deadline for a new collective bargaining agreement to be in place to conduct a 162-game season to March 9.

The two sides continued negotiations on March 9 where an international draft became a focal point in negotiations. The league also proposed a slot value of $5.5 million for the first overall draft pick, which was slightly up from their last proposal. In the union's counter proposal, its proposed CBT thresholds dropped further. After previously seeking year-to-year thresholds of $238 million, $244 million, $250 million, $256 million and $263 million, the March 9 proposal from the union offered thresholds of $232 million, $235 million, $240 million, $245 million, and $250 million. The union also proposed a $710,000 league minimum in 2022, $10,000 away from the league's proposed $700,000 figure. Despite the league and the union closing the gap on these core economics issues, the international draft was a major disagreement. The league would not give a full counter to the union until they picked one of those choices, and set a deadline for 6 p.m. EST for a decision to be made. When the union declined all three offers, the league postponed games once again, this time until April 14. Despite this, negotiations between the two sides on the international draft continued into the early morning hours of March 10. While no deal was made, the two sides did announce they would meet again later in the day.

Negotiations continued formally on March 10. The two sides reached an agreement regarding the international draft, something that halted negotiations a day prior. Following this agreement, the league made a full counter-proposal which saw its proposed pre-arbitration bonus pool rise from $40 million to $50 million. The players' union voted 26–12 to accept the league's proposal. During a meeting at 6:00 p.m. EST, MLB team owners voted unanimously to ratify the new collective bargaining agreement. The lockout was officially lifted one hour later at 7:00 p.m. EST.

== Final agreement ==
The new collective bargaining agreement will last for five years. The provisons agreed to are as follows:

- Designated Hitter introduced in the National League
- Postseason expanded to twelve teams from ten
- Luxury tax thresholds are raised.
  - The initial tax threshold goes from $230 million in 2022 to $242 million in 2026.
  - A fourth tax threshold is introduced for the first time
- Draft lottery in the MLB draft
- $50 million pre-arbitration bonus pool
- Allows teams to have advertising on uniforms and helmets
- Game 163 tiebreaker eliminated
- A Joint Competition Committee featuring players, umpires, and MLB appointed members to introduce rule changes
- Major League minimum salary increases. Salary increases from $570,500 to $700,000 in 2022. Increases $20,000 every year after.
- Continue negotiating on an international draft until July 2022

== Aftermath ==
The lockout was officially lifted at 7:00 p.m. EST, on Thursday, March 10, restoring teams' abilities to be in contact with players and effectively reopening free agency. At the time of the lockout's lifting, there were approximately 250 free agents remaining unsigned, including notable players such as Carlos Correa, Freddie Freeman, and Clayton Kershaw. As the lockout was lifted, the likeness of active players was reinstated on official MLB websites and social media accounts after a three-month hiatus with only content relating to retired players, minor leaguers, and miscellaneous topics.

Players began to arrive at Cactus League and Grapefruit League training sites on March 11, two days before the mandatory reporting date and 27 days before the regular season's Opening Day on April 7.

The first free agent to be signed following the lockout was Drew VerHagen by the St. Louis Cardinals on March 11. The first eight-figure contract agreed upon post-lockout was Carlos Rodón with the San Francisco Giants for $44 million over two years.

In July 2022, the Major League Baseball Players Association rejected an offer from Major League Baseball to create an international draft for young players entering the league from outside the United States, Canada and Puerto Rico. The rejection came at the CBA set deadline for the two sides to reach an agreement to implement an international draft. If the two sides had reached an agreement on an international draft, the qualifying offer system would have been eliminated.

== Reactions ==
=== Players ===
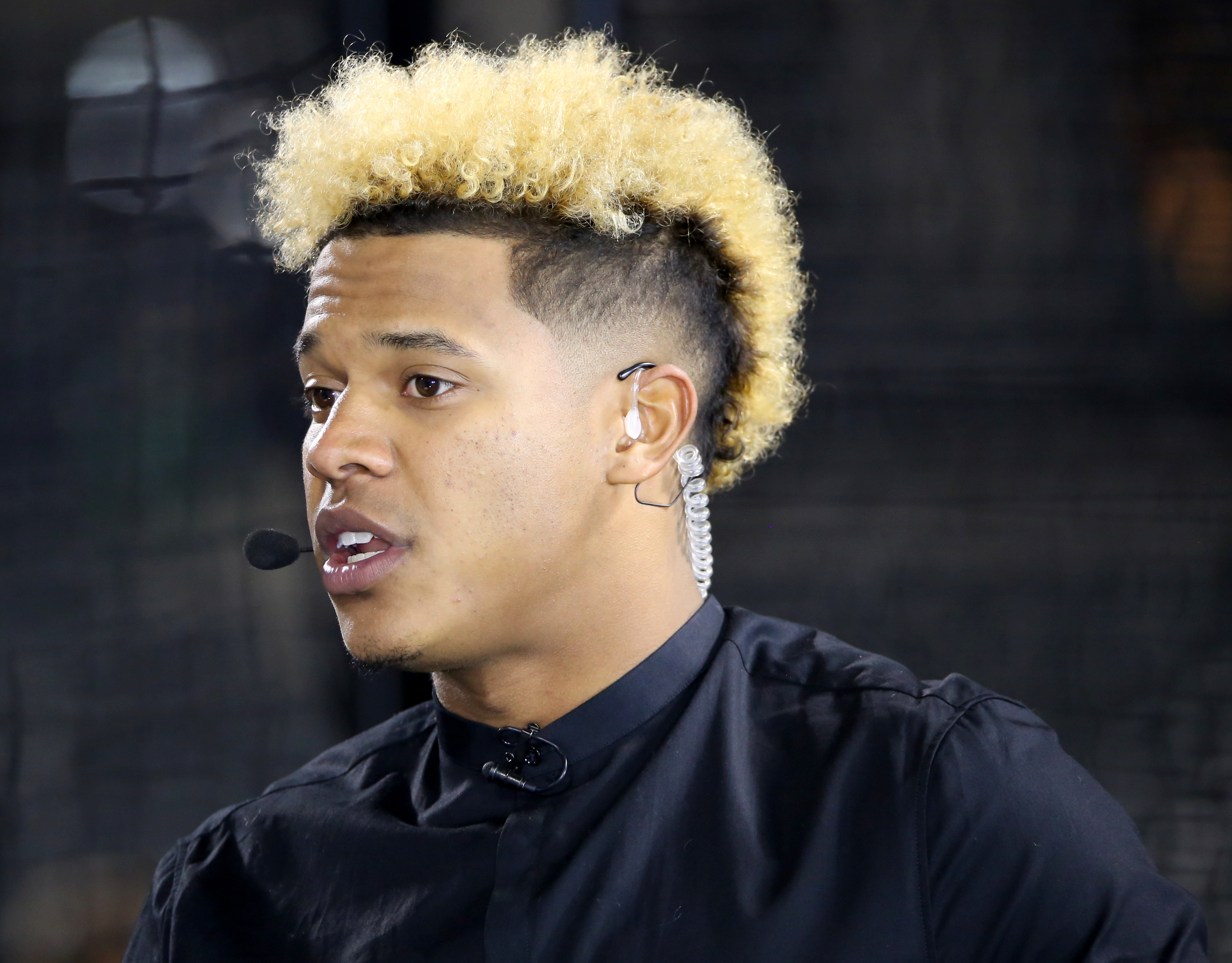
Marcus Stroman was among many players who criticized MLB for the lockout on social media.

Several players spoke out about the lockout, mostly in alignment with the MLBPA and often in criticism of MLB. Upon the instatement of the lockout, many players took to social media to share their reactions, Jake Diekman and Andrew McCutchen sharing memes about the situation. Several players, including Trevor Williams, changed their Twitter avatars to a blank silhouette of a player used on MLB.com player profiles due to the lockout. Marcus Stroman criticized Rob Manfred after several failed negotiations in early February, calling him "Manclown" and saying that he needed to "stop ruining baseball." Following the cancellation of regular season games after more failed negotiations in late February, Stroman criticized Manfred again, taking to Twitter to call for his firing and expressing his grievances with MLB's marketing of players. Mike Trout spoke out on the cancellations, criticizing the league's perceived unwillingness to compromise and saying that a fair CBA needed to be achieved despite his desire to play games.

=== Media ===
Many members of baseball media criticized the lockout, both through social media and opinion articles. ESPN's Jeff Passan tweeted that "If you went and got the next 1,200 best players in the world, the product would suffer greatly. If you handed MLB teams over to any 30 competent businesspeople, the sport would not suffer. Actually, it might improve." Tyler Kepner of The New York Times described MLB's final February offer as "an offer that was engineered to be rejected." Grant Brisbee of The Athletic criticized the owners and the dialogue surrounding the lockout, declaring that there was "no both-sidesing this one."

=== Fans ===
In a poll conducted by the Los Angeles Times among adults who considered themselves baseball fans, 6 in 10 respondents said that the lockout was making them lose interest in the 2022 MLB season. A Morning Consult poll released on March 8 found that among self-identified MLB fans, 45% blamed team owners for the stalemate in negotiations while 21% blamed the players and 34% had no opinion. The survey found a higher percentage of blame for the owners than a 2020 Morning Consult poll that was taken when the league was attempting to negotiate a shortened season in response to the COVID-19 pandemic.

Specific aspects of MLB and MLBPA proposals were met with mixed reactions by fans. The prospect of larger bases was met with criticism by some fans while others praised the idea for its potential to reduce player injuries from sliding or tripping.
