= 1990 Major League Baseball lockout =

1990 labor dispute in Major League Baseball

- Date: February 15, 1990 – March 19, 1990 (1 month and 4 days)
- Location: United States; Canada
- Caused by: Expiration of collective bargaining agreement on December 31, 1989
- Result: Agreement reached to end lockout on March 19: Shortened spring training; Start of the 1990 season delayed to April 9; Agreement that resolved the lockout expires on December 31, 1993; MLBPA goes on strike in 1994

Parties
Major League Baseball Players' Association (MLBPA)	Major League Baseball (MLB)

Lead figures
Donald Fehr (executive director)	Fay Vincent (commissioner)

The 1990 Major League Baseball lockout was the seventh work stoppage in baseball and, at the time, the second-longest since 1972. Beginning in February, the lockout lasted 32 days, virtually wiping out spring training, moving Opening Day back a week to April 9 and extending the season three days to accommodate the normal 162-game schedule.

== Background ==
The five-year Basic Agreement between the players and owners was set to expire on December 31, 1989. During the buildup to the lockout, the two sides spent months trying to iron out long-standing disagreements over free agency and arbitration; following arbitrator determinations that the owners had colluded in suppressing player wages in the mid-1980s, with a more open labor market player remuneration had rapidly increased. By the end of the 1989 season, salaries for nine top players had reached the $3 million-a-year level. In 1988, national television broadcasting contracts had been negotiated which brought revenue to $1.5 billion over four years, amounting to a 102 percent increase on the previous contract. Given the significant increase in funds available and the earlier disagreements over free agency there was a likelihood of a dispute.

=== Owners' plan ===
The owners set forth a revenue sharing plan in which 48% of gate receipts and all revenue from local and network broadcasting would go toward paying player salaries. These salaries would be based on a pay-for-performance scale, in which players with less than six years of experience would be compensated based on a ranking against their peers. Perhaps most importantly, a salary cap would be placed on each club. In the process, there would be a stipulation put in place that teams reaching the said cap could make no more free agent signings or salary increases.

Owners claimed that under the plan, average player salaries would proceed to rise over 20% to $770,000 by the 1993 season. They cited rising attendance figures as well as solid television contracts with CBS and ESPN.

=== MLBPA's response ===
Although revenue sharing of this type had worked considerably well in the National Basketball Association, Major League Baseball Players Association (MLBPA) Executive Director Donald Fehr, feared that a salary cap would restrict the number of choices free agents could make. He argued that a pay-for-performance scale would eliminate multi-year contracts. Players were concerned that the owners were trying to limit free agency and had been engaged in long term preparations for a dispute.

== Resolution ==
Commissioner Fay Vincent worked with both sides and, on March 19, a new Basic Agreement was reached. The minimum major league salary was raised from $68,000 to $100,000. Meanwhile, a six-man study committee on revenue sharing was established.

== See also ==
- 1990 Major League Baseball season
- 2021–22 Major League Baseball lockout, which had the same outcome as the one in 1990.

== Sources ==
- Staudohar, Paul D.; Lande, Laurie B. (1990). "Baseball labor relations: the lockout of 1990". Monthly Labor Review. 113 (10): 32–36. ISSN 0098-1818. JSTOR 41843378.
- Jennings, Ken (1990). "Baseball on the Bargaining Bubble: The 1990 Labor-Management Negotiations". Labor Law Journal. 41 (11): 751–761.
- Justice, Richard (February 11, 1990). "Baseball lockout seems to be on deck". The Washington Post.
