= Ken Moffett =

American federal mediator (1931–2021)

2nd Executive Director of the Major League Baseball Players Association
- In office December 9, 1983 – December 1, 1985
- Preceded by: Marvin Miller
- Succeeded by: Marvin Miller (interim)

Personal details
- Born: September 11, 1931 Lykens, Pennsylvania, U.S.
- Died: November 19, 2021 (aged 90)

Kenneth Elwood Moffett (September 11, 1931 – November 19, 2021) was an American federal mediator and union official. He was the former executive director of the baseball players’ union. Joseph A. McCartin of Georgetown University called Moffett “one of the most skilled and dedicated mediators to have emerged in U.S. labor relations in the postwar era.”

== Early life ==
Moffett served in the United States Navy during the Korean War. After his military service, Moffett built a career as a federal mediator with the Federal Mediation and Conciliation Service, where he became one of the agency's most prominent figures. He played a central role in resolving the 1981 Major League Baseball strike, a 50 day work stoppage that became the longest in the sport's history to that point, earning him recognition from both labor and management. His success in that dispute led to his appointment as executive director of the Major League Baseball Players Association in December 1983, succeeding the legendary Marvin Miller. His tenure proved contentious: owners fired him in December 1985 after less than two years, contending that he was too accommodating to management and had failed to press the union's interests aggressively enough. Miller returned briefly as interim director following Moffett's dismissal.

Moffett's background in labor was deeply rooted. His great great grandfather was part of the Molly Maguires, the militant Irish American coal miners who battled mine owners in Pennsylvania, and his grandfather founded a local branch of the mine workers union. His father, Elwood, became president of District 50, a group of some 250,000 chemical and industrial workers. Moffett later said that unionism "was ingrained in me" from childhood. The family moved frequently due to his father's union work, with Moffett attending eight schools in eight states in eight years before the family settled in suburban Langley Park, Maryland. He studied physical education at the University of Maryland, receiving a bachelor's degree in 1958, before working as an organizer at District 50 and launching his mediation career in 1961 at the FMCS office in Cleveland. After his dismissal from the Players Association, he became an assistant to the president of the National Association of Broadcast Employees and Technicians in 1985, remaining after its merger with the Communications Workers of America in 1994, and later worked as an arbitrator. Outside of work, Moffett was a dedicated long-distance runner who completed marathons in Boston, Washington, New York and Honolulu, saying running helped him build stamina for negotiations.

Beyond baseball, Moffett was involved in resolving the 1981 air traffic controllers' dispute in the wake of the PATCO strike, and mediated numerous other high-profile labor conflicts throughout his career in federal service.
