= Donald Fehr =

American sports labor leader

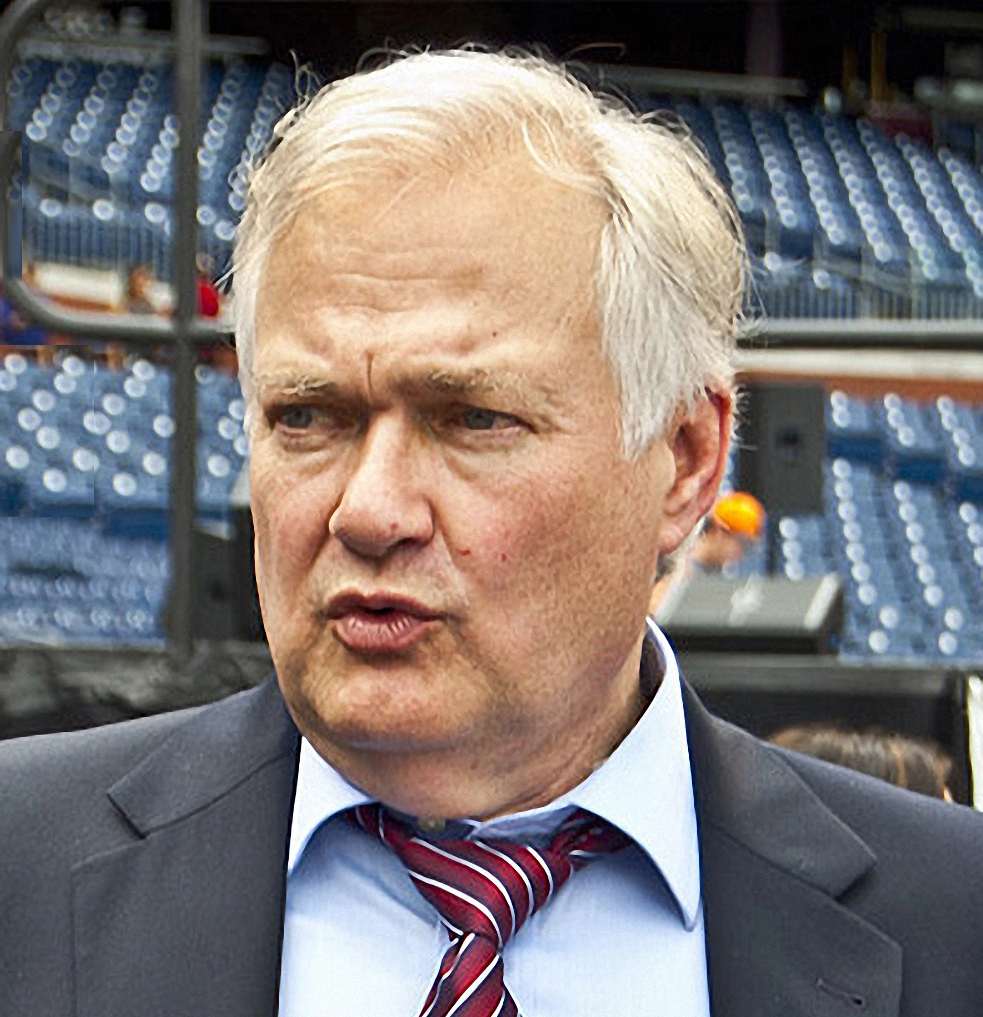
- Fehr in 2011

5th Executive Director of the National Hockey League Players' Association
- In office 2010–2023
- Preceded by: Paul Kelly; Mike Ouellet (interim)
- Succeeded by: Marty Walsh

3rd Executive Director of the Major League Baseball Players Association
- In office December 9, 1983 – June 22, 2009 (acting Dec. 9, 1983–Dec. 1, 1985)
- Preceded by: Marvin Miller (interim)
- Succeeded by: Michael Weiner

Personal details
- Born: Donald Martin Fehr; July 18, 1948 (age 78) Marion, Indiana, U.S.

Donald Martin Fehr (born July 18, 1948) is an American former sports executive and union leader. He was the fifth executive director of the NHL Players Association from 2010 to 2023. He became nationally prominent while serving as the executive director of the MLB Players Association from 1983 to 2009.

== Life and career ==
Fehr's parents are Irene Sylvia (née Gulko) and Louis Alvin Fehr, of German-Jewish descent. He was raised in Prairie Village, Kansas. He graduated from Indiana University Bloomington in 1970 with a degree in political science and was a member of Sigma Alpha Mu fraternity. Fehr received his J.D. degree from the University of Missouri-Kansas City School of Law.

=== MLBPA ===
As a young lawyer, Fehr assisted the MLBPA in the Andy Messersmith and Dave McNally arbitration case (later known as the Seitz decision). In 1977, Marvin Miller hired Fehr as the Players Association general counsel.

In December 1985, Fehr was voted executive director of the MLBPA after having served as acting director since December 9, 1983. Fehr successfully challenged the owners' collusion, leading to the owners paying $280 million in damages to the players.

Fehr led the players union through the 1994–95 Major League Baseball strike and subsequent World Series cancellation. He was instrumental in implementing the rejection of future admissions into the MLBPA of replacement players who planned to fill in during the strike of 1995. Fehr attended the 1995 New York Yankees' home opener against the Texas Rangers, which saw only 50,425 fans show up making it was the smallest opening day crowd at Yankee Stadium since 1990. Fehr's presence angered many fans who blamed him for ruining their team's postseason chances and what would have been Don Mattingly's postseason debut. Fans booed Fehr and yelled "You ruined the game!" in response to him having attended the final game played at Yankee Stadium before the strike, and booed as he left the stadium; one fan also held up a sign saying "$HAME ON YOU!", to which Fehr responded by flipping off the fan.

On June 22, 2009, Fehr announced his intention to step down as the MLBPA executive director position, recommending Michael Weiner as his successor. This was subject to the approval of the union's executive board and possible ratification by all players. He officially relinquished his job to Weiner in December 2009.

On September 8, 2021, twelve years after leaving Major League Baseball, Fehr delivered the Hall of Fame induction speech for former MLBPA Executive Director Marvin Miller, who was elected in 2020, eight years after his death.

=== NHLPA ===
Shortly after leaving his position as executive director of the MLBPA, Fehr took up a position as an advisor to the NHL Players' Association. On December 18, 2010, Fehr was voted in by the NHLPA as their executive director.

With the NHL locking out the players at midnight on September 15, 2012, Fehr became the only executive director of a players' union to be directly involved in work stoppages in two sports. Six of the eight contract negotiations he has been involved in have resulted in work stoppages, including five consecutive negotiations between the MLBPA and Major League Baseball.

In an October 2021 report detailing the sexual assault of Kyle Beach by the Chicago Blackhawks’ video coach Brad Aldrich and ensuing coverup by the organization revealed Beach reported this assault to Fehr, who ultimately did nothing. In an October 28 statement, Fehr admitted the NHLPA failed Beach.

Fehr left his NHLPA post in February 2023, replaced by former United States Secretary of Labor Marty Walsh.

Sporting positions
Preceded by Marvin Miller	MLBPA Executive Director; 1983–2009	Succeeded by Michael Weiner
Preceded by Mike Ouellet (interim)	NHLPA Executive Director; 2010–2023	Succeeded by Marty Walsh
