= Michael Weiner (executive) =

American lawyer (1961-2013)

4th Executive Director of the Major League Baseball Players Association
- In office June 22, 2009 – November 21, 2013
- Preceded by: Donald Fehr
- Succeeded by: Tony Clark

Personal details
- Born: December 21, 1961 Paterson, New Jersey, U.S.
- Died: November 21, 2013 (aged 51) Mansfield Township, New Jersey, U.S.
- Spouse: Diane Margolin
- Children: 3
- Education: Williams College; Harvard Law School
- Occupation: Sports players union executive, lawyer

Michael S. Weiner (December 21, 1961 – November 21, 2013) was an American attorney who served as the executive director of the Major League Baseball Players Association for four years. He assumed the role on June 22, 2009, replacing Donald Fehr, becoming only the fifth executive director of the union. Weiner joined the organization in September 1988 and had been general counsel since 2004.

== Early life ==
He was born in Paterson, New Jersey. He moved to Pompton Lakes, New Jersey at the age of two and attended Pompton Lakes High School. Weiner received his undergraduate degree in political economy from Williams College in 1983. He graduated from Harvard Law School in 1986.

== Career ==
From 1986 to 1988, Michael served as law clerk to H. Lee Sarokin, then United States District Court Judge, in Newark, New Jersey.

With Weiner at the helm, the union signed an agreement in November 2011 for a five-year contract running until December 2016, which ensured 21 consecutive years of labor peace in Major League Baseball. The agreement allowed for blood testing for human growth hormone, introduced restraints on bonuses for amateur draft picks and international signings, and restored salary arbitration eligibility for part of a class of players that lost it in the 1980s.

== Personal life and death ==
A resident of Mansfield Township, Warren County, New Jersey, Weiner was an active congregant of the Jewish Center of Northwest Jersey in Warren County

Weiner was diagnosed with a brain tumor in August 2012, and died 15 months later, on November 21, 2013. He was 51 years old. He was succeeded by his deputy, Tony Clark, the first former Major League Baseball player to lead the union. He was survived by his wife, the former Diane Margolin, and three daughters, Margie, Grace and Sally.
