= Major League Baseball Players Association =

North American labor union

MLBPA
- Major League Baseball Players Association
- Founded: 1966; 60 years ago
- Headquarters: Tower 49, New York City
- Location: United States, Canada
- Members: 1,200 (Major League); 5,500 (Minor League)
- Key people: Bruce Meyer (Executive Director); Francisco Lindor (Association Representative); Marcus Semien (Association Representative); Jack Flaherty (Association Representative); Lance McCullers Jr.(Association Representative)
- Affiliations: AFL-CIO
- Website: mlbplayers.com

The Major League Baseball Players Association (MLBPA) is the labor union representing all current Major League Baseball (MLB) and Minor League Baseball (MiLB) players. All players, managers, coaches, and athletic trainers who hold or have held a signed contract with a Major League club are eligible for membership in the Association. The MLBPA has three major divisions: a labor union, a business (Players Choice Group Licensing Program), and a charitable foundation (Major League Baseball Players Trust).

On August 28, 2022, the MLBPA publicly launched a campaign to help MiLB players unionize. On September 9, 2022, MLB voluntarily recognized the MLBPA as the union for over 5,500 MiLB players playing rookie level to Triple-A.

== Players Choice group licensing ==
The MLBPA's Players Choice group licensing program utilizes collective marketing to assist licensees and sponsors who want to associate their brands and products with that of Major League players, teams, and coaches. Through an individual agreement with each player, the MLBPA holds exclusive right to use, license and sublicense the names, numbers, nicknames, likenesses, signatures and other personal indicia (known as "publicity rights") of active Major League Baseball players who are its members for use in connection with any product, brand, service or product line when more than two players are involved.

Among its other functions, the Players Choice licensing program also protects the rights of players from exploitation by unauthorized parties.

== Major League Baseball Players Trust ==
Major League Baseball players also formed the Players Trust, a charitable foundation that is the first of its kind in professional sports. Through the Players Trust, Major Leaguers contribute their time, money and fame to call attention to important issues affecting those in need and to help encourage others to get involved in their own communities.

Many programs including Buses for Baseball, City Clinics, Medicines for Humanity, the Players Choice Awards, Volunteers of America, and MLB Players STEM League are funded through the foundation.

=== Action Team ===
In 2003, the Major League Baseball Players Trust and Volunteers of America created the Action Team National Youth Volunteer Program to recruit and train high school students to become volunteers in their communities.

=== Players Choice Awards ===
The Players Choice Awards is an award ceremony held to recognize each season's best performers, as chosen by the players themselves. Each Players Choice Awards winner designates the charity of his choice to receive a grant from the Player's Trust.

== History ==
The MLBPA was not the first attempt to unionize baseball players. Earlier attempts had included:

- Brotherhood of Professional Baseball Players - 1885 (founded by John Montgomery Ward)

In 1898, Baltimore Orioles players John McGraw, Hughie Jennings, Joe Kelley, and Willie Keeler discussed the formation of "mutual defense organization" analogous to a trade union and meant to protect the interests of the players.

- Players' Protective Association - 1900
- Fraternity of Professional Baseball Players of America - 1912
- National Baseball Players Association of the United States - 1922 (founded by Raymond Joseph Cannon)
- The American Baseball Guild – 1946 (founded by labor lawyer Robert Murphy)

=== Leadership ===
==== Pre-unionized ====
President

- Bob Feller: 1956–1959

Executive Director

- Frank Scott: May 1, 1959 – 1966

==== Unionized ====
Executive Director	Tenure
Marvin Miller	1966 – 1982, 1983 (interim)
Ken Moffett	December 9, 1982 – November 22, 1983
Donald Fehr	December 9, 1983 – December 1, 1985 (acting), December 1, 1985 – June 22, 2009
Michael Weiner	June 22, 2009 – November 21, 2013
Tony Clark	December 2, 2013 – February 17, 2026
Bruce Meyer	February 18, 2026 – present (interim)

==== Marvin Miller era (1966–1983) ====
The organization that would eventually become the MLBPA was conceived in 1953, but it was not officially recognized as a union until 1966. That year the newly recognized union hired Marvin Miller from the United Steel Workers of America to head the organization, serving as executive director until 1983. During Miller's tenure, base salaries, pension funds, licensing rights, and revenues increased.

In 1968, Miller negotiated the first collective bargaining agreement (CBA) with the team owners, which raised the minimum salary from $6,000 to $10,000 per year. The 1970 CBA included arbitration to resolve disputes. The major leagues saw their first player strike in 1972, in opposition to the owners' refusal to increase player pension funds.

In 1974, when Oakland owner Charlie Finley failed to make a $50,000 payment into an insurance annuity as called for in Catfish Hunter's contract, the MLBPA took the case to arbitration. The arbitrator ruled that Hunter could be a free agent.

When pitchers Andy Messersmith and Dave McNally had their 1974 contracts automatically renewed by their teams, the MLBPA supported them by challenging the reserve clause which was used by team owners to bind players to one team. On December 23, 1975, arbitrator Peter Seitz ruled in favor of the players. Following the Seitz decision, the modern free agent system was created, and the strength of the union was immeasurably increased.

Players and owners failed to come to terms over free agent compensation, which led to another strike in 1981. In the late 1980s and early 1990s the MLBPA filed collusion charges, arguing that team owners had violated the collective bargaining agreement in the 1985–1987 seasons. The MLBPA won each case, resulting in "second look" free agents, and over $269 million in owner fines.

==== Donald Fehr era (1985–2009) ====
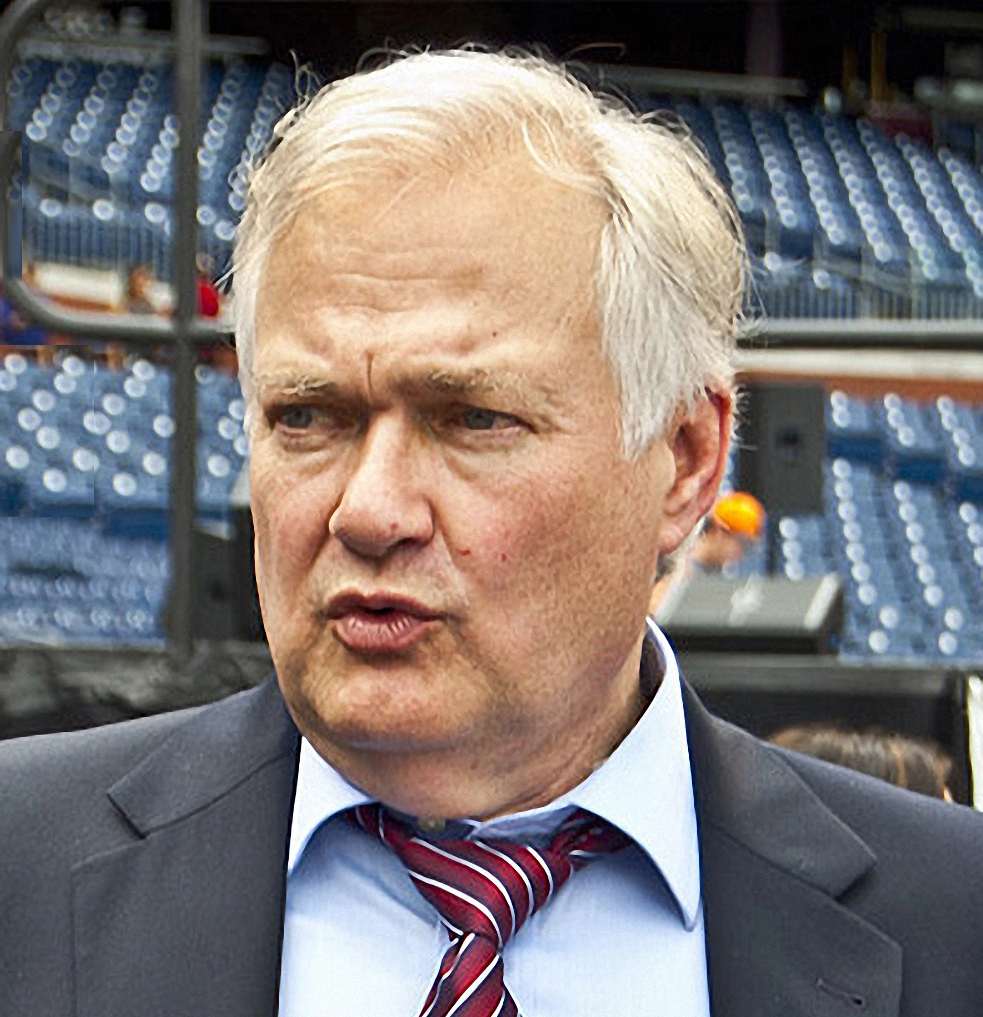
Donald Fehr

After Miller retired, Ken Moffett became the new executive director in December 1982, but in November 1983 he was dismissed, and Marvin Miller was named interim director. Donald Fehr, who joined the MLBPA as general counsel in 1977, was named acting director in December 1983.

The MLBPA under Fehr filed several grievances against MLB owners. In the late 1980s, MLB owners were accused of collusion to prevent player salaries from rising. The MLBPA filed grievances against the owners in 1986 and 1987. In 1987, arbitrator Tom Roberts found that owners had violated the terms of the Basic Agreement, with players later being awarded $10.5 million. In 1989, arbitrator George Nicolau found that owners had violated the Basic Agreement on the second grievance, with players awarded $38 million.

In 1988, the MLBPA filed another grievance against the owners for colluding to control player salaries. The MLBPA claims that the owners created an information bank to share information on players and restrain salaries. The MLBPA won this grievance in 1990, with a settlement being reached to award players a total of $280 million in damages for the collusion.

Under Fehr, the MLBPA dealt with a 32-day lockout by MLB owners in 1990. The MLBPA participated in a 232-day players strike in 1994 and 1995. While Fehr led the MLBPA, player salaries rose from an average of $413,000 to almost $3 million. The Collective Bargaining Agreements in 2002 and 2006 were reached without a strike by the players or a lockout by the owners. This was a period of 16 years without a work stoppage by either side.

Fehr was also a contributor in the creation of the World Baseball Classic international baseball tournament.

==== Michael Weiner & Tony Clark era (2009–2026) ====
In 2009, Donald Fehr resigned from the position. The players selected Michael Weiner, who had worked for the union since 1988, as his replacement. On November 21, 2013, Weiner died after a 15-month battle with a non-operable brain tumor. Former All-Star Tony Clark, the deputy executive director, was named executive director on December 2, 2013, becoming the first former major league player to lead the union.

In 2016, the MLBPA celebrated its 50th anniversary as a union, commemorating the event at the 2016 All-Star Game with a golden anniversary logo.

Between December 2021 and March 2022, MLB owners enacted a lockout as the 2016 collective bargaining agreement expired, resulting in the first MLB work stoppage since the 1994–95 strike and the first lockout of the players since 1990. The lockout ended with a signing of a new CBA and resulted in no cancelled games for the 2022 season, although Opening Day was delayed one week.

In September 2022, the MLBPA became the union for all Minor League Baseball players.

In April 2024, the MLBPA put pressure on MLB following a controversy concerning the quality of uniforms following a switch in manufacturing from Majestic to Fanatics.

In October 2025, an investigation into Players Way, an organization owned by the MLBPA, was revealed.

Clark resigned as executive director on February 17, 2026.

=== Basic agreements ===
In 1968, the Major League Baseball Players Association negotiated the first-ever Collective Bargaining Agreement (CBA) in professional sports. Several agreements have been negotiated since the original agreement, the latest of which, effective March 2022, will expire in 2026. The first ever CBA for Minor League Baseball players has been effective since March 2023 and will expire in 2027.

== MLBPA/MLB joint initiatives ==
=== Joint Drug Agreement ===
The Joint Drug Agreement went into effect in December 2011 and is scheduled to terminate Dec. 1, 2016, the same date as the Basic Agreement. The prohibited substances section of the Joint Drug Agreement is updated annually.

=== Domestic violence policy ===
In August 2015, Major League Baseball and the MLBPA reached agreement on the Joint Domestic Violence, Sexual Assault and Child Abuse Policy, and is intended to provide a comprehensive policy addressing issues such as protecting the legal rights of players, treating violations seriously, holding players accountable through appropriate disciplinary measures and providing resources for the intervention and care of victims, families and the players themselves.

The terms of this joint policy cover four primary areas: Treatment & Intervention; Investigations; Discipline; and Training, Education & Resources.

=== Youth baseball initiative ===
In June 2016, executive director Tony Clark and MLB commissioner Rob Manfred, along with Curtis Granderson, Andrew McCutchen, Marquis Grissom, and Ken Griffey Jr., announced major initiatives within youth baseball in a press conference held at Citi Field.

On top of jointly donating over $2 million several youth-focused initiatives supported by current and former Major League player, other major initiatives included financial contributions to youth baseball projects and the creation of a partnership with Positive Coaching Alliance for the training of coaches and administrators from the Reviving Baseball in Inner Cities program.

== Miscellaneous ==
=== Salary cap ===
Major League Baseball is the only major professional sports league in North America that does not have a salary cap, as of 2026; the NBA, NFL, MLS, and NHL all implement some sort of salary cap. MLB has a luxury tax that penalizes clubs that exceed the designated amount for that season.

=== Steroids ===
The MLBPA was initially opposed to random steroid testing, claiming it to be a violation of the privacy of players. After the BALCO steroid scandal surrounding the alleged or actual involvement of several star players, the players dropped their opposition to a steroid testing program and developed a consensus that favored testing. Under pressure from US Congress which threatened to pass a law if the MLB's drug policy was not strengthened, the MLBPA agreed in 2005 to a stricter policy that would include 50-game, 100-game, and lifetime suspensions.

== See also ==
- Japan Professional Baseball Players Association

=== Similar organizations ===
- National Basketball Players Association
- NFL Players Association
- MLS Players Association
- National Hockey League Players' Association
