= 2014 American League Division Series =

Teams
Team (Wins)		Manager	Season
Kansas City Royals (3)		Ned Yost	89–73 (.549), GB: 1
Los Angeles Angels of Anaheim (0)		Mike Scioscia	98–64 (.605), GA: 10
- Dates: October 2–5
- Television: TBS
- TV announcers: Ernie Johnson Jr., Ron Darling, Cal Ripken Jr. and Matt Winer
- Radio: ESPN
- Radio announcers: Jon Sciambi and Chris Singleton
- Umpires: Ted Barrett (crew chief), Lance Barksdale, Chris Guccione, Paul Nauert, Jeff Nelson, Jim Reynolds

Teams
Team (Wins)		Manager	Season
Baltimore Orioles (3)		Buck Showalter	96–66 (.593), GA: 12
Detroit Tigers (0)		Brad Ausmus	90–72 (.556), GA: 1
- Dates: October 2–5
- Television: TBS
- TV announcers: Brian Anderson, Dennis Eckersley, Joe Simpson and Jaime Maggio
- Radio: ESPN
- Radio announcers: Chris Berman (Games 1–2), Dave Flemming (Game 3), and Rick Sutcliffe
- Umpires: Jeff Kellogg (crew chief), Scott Barry, Dan Bellino, Fieldin Culbreth, Paul Schrieber, Jim Wolf
- ALWC: Kansas City Royals defeated Oakland Athletics, 9–8 (12)

The 2014 American League Division Series were two best-of-five playoff series in Major League Baseball’s (MLB) 2014 postseason to determine the participating teams in the 2014 American League Championship Series. The Los Angeles Angels of Anaheim, Baltimore Orioles, and Detroit Tigers (divisional winners, seeded 1–3 based on regular season record) as well as the Wild Card Game winning Kansas City Royals played in the two series. TBS carried all the games.

These matchups were:

- (1) Los Angeles Angels of Anaheim (AL West champions) vs. (4) Kansas City Royals (Wild Card Game winner): Royals won the series, 3–0.
- (2) Baltimore Orioles (AL East champions) vs. (3) Detroit Tigers (AL Central champions): Orioles won the series, 3–0.

The higher seeded team in each series hosted Games 1, 2, and 5 (if necessary), and the lower seeded team hosted Games 3 and 4 (if necessary).

This was the first postseason played under the post-1993 divisional alignment in which neither the Boston Red Sox nor the New York Yankees competed in an ALDS. It was also the Royals' first appearance in the current version of the ALDS, as their last previous postseason appearance had come in 1985, prior to its conception (although the team had played in one of the 1981 ALDS necessitated by that year's player strike and the resulting split season). It was also the Orioles' first ALDS win since 1997.

Both the Angels and the Royals, and the Tigers and the Orioles, met for the first time in the postseason.

The Royals went on to defeat the Orioles in the ALCS, then lost the 2014 World Series to the National League champion San Francisco Giants.

To date, the 2014 ALDS marks the last postseason appearance for the Angels and is also the most recent series in which the Orioles won a postseason game.

== Matchups ==
=== Los Angeles Angels of Anaheim vs. Kansas City Royals ===
Kansas City won the series, 3–0.

Game	Date	Score	Location	Time	Attendance
1	October 2	Kansas City Royals – 3, Los Angeles Angels of Anaheim – 2 (11)	Angel Stadium	4:05	45,321
2	October 3	Kansas City Royals – 4, Los Angeles Angels of Anaheim – 1 (11)	Angel Stadium	3:48	45,361
3	October 5	Los Angeles Angels of Anaheim – 3, Kansas City Royals – 8	Kauffman Stadium	3:38	40,657

=== Baltimore Orioles vs. Detroit Tigers ===
Baltimore won the series, 3–0.

Game	Date	Score	Location	Time	Attendance
1	October 2	Detroit Tigers – 3, Baltimore Orioles – 12	Oriole Park at Camden Yards	3:42	47,842
2	October 3	Detroit Tigers – 6, Baltimore Orioles – 7	Oriole Park at Camden Yards	3:41	48,058
3	October 5	Baltimore Orioles – 2, Detroit Tigers – 1	Comerica Park	3:41	43,013

== Los Angeles vs. Kansas City ==
=== Game 1 ===
October 2, 2014 9:07 p.m. (EDT) at Angel Stadium of Anaheim in Anaheim, California 93 °F (34 °C), clear
Team	1	2	3	4	5	6	7	8	9	10	11	R	H	E
Kansas City	0	0	1	0	1	0	0	0	0	0	1	3	4	0
Los Angeles	0	0	1	0	1	0	0	0	0	0	0	2	4	0
WP: Danny Duffy (1–0) LP: Fernando Salas (0–1) Sv: Greg Holland (1); Home runs: KC: Mike Moustakas (1); LAA: Chris Iannetta (1), David Freese (1); Attendance: 45,321; Boxscore

Mike Moustakas, a native of Los Angeles (a handful of miles away from Anaheim), hit a 374-foot (114 m) home run deep into right field in the 11th inning to give the Royals a 3–2 victory in Game 1. Closer Greg Holland, who arrived during the fourth inning following a trip to North Carolina for the birth of his son, pitched a perfect bottom half of the 11th to seal the Royals' victory. Alcides Escobar had an RBI double in the third inning, allowing Moustakas to score, and Omar Infante's sacrifice fly allowed Alex Gordon to score in the fifth. The Angels' only scores were home runs from Chris Iannetta in the third and David Freese in the fifth.

This game also started a string of postseason games in which the Royals defense would make a number of highlight reel defensive plays. Outfielders Lorenzo Cain and Nori Aoki each had a pair of great catches, which slowed down the Angels' high powered offense.

=== Game 2 ===
October 3, 2014 9:37 p.m. (EDT) at Angel Stadium of Anaheim in Anaheim, California 93 °F (34 °C), clear
Team	1	2	3	4	5	6	7	8	9	10	11	R	H	E
Kansas City	0	1	0	0	0	0	0	0	0	0	3	4	8	1
Los Angeles	0	0	0	0	0	1	0	0	0	0	0	1	6	2
WP: Brandon Finnegan (1–0) LP: Kevin Jepsen (0–1) Sv: Greg Holland (2); Home runs: KC: Eric Hosmer (1); LAA: None; Attendance: 45,361; Boxscore

Eric Hosmer hit a two-run homer and Salvador Pérez recorded an RBI infield single in the 11th inning, as the Royals won Game 2, 4–1. Kansas City scored first on Alex Gordon's RBI single in the second, but the Angels tied the game in the sixth with Albert Pujols' RBI single.

Kansas City again came up with a timely defensive gem. In the bottom of the eighth with no outs and pinch runner Collin Cowgill at second base, Jarrod Dyson caught a fly ball to left-center field off Chris Iannetta, and then threw a strike to Mike Moustakas at third to double-up Cowgill, who tried to advance on the play.

=== Game 3 ===
October 5, 2014 7:37 p.m. (EDT) at Kauffman Stadium in Kansas City, Missouri 63 °F (17 °C), mostly cloudy
Team	1	2	3	4	5	6	7	8	9	R	H	E
Los Angeles	1	0	0	1	0	0	0	1	0	3	8	0
Kansas City	3	0	2	2	0	1	0	0	X	8	9	0
WP: James Shields (1–0) LP: C. J. Wilson (0–1); Home runs: LAA: Mike Trout (1), Albert Pujols (1); KC: Eric Hosmer (2), Mike Moustakas (2); Attendance: 40,657; Boxscore

The Angels took their only lead of this series with a one out home run by Mike Trout in the top of the first off James Shields, but C. J. Wilson gave up a triple in the bottom half to Alex Gordon and was immediately knocked out of the game. Eric Hosmer would add his second home run of this series, a two-run home run in the third off Hector Santiago, to make it 5–1 Royals. The Angels cut it to 5–2 in the fourth on Albert Pujols's home run, but in the bottom of the inning, Mike Morin allowed a one-out home run to Mike Moustakas, then two singles to put runners on first and third before Lorenzo Cain's sacrifice fly made it 7–2 Royals. They made it 8–2 in the sixth off Kevin Jepsen on Nori Aoki's RBI single that scored Omar Infante from second. The Angels scored the last run of the series in the eighth off Wade Davis on Josh Hamilton's groundout with runners on second and third as the Royals completed a three-game sweep to punch their ticket to the 2014 ALCS.

The defense again showed up for Kansas City. The highlights of the game included back-to-back diving catches in the fifth inning by Lorenzo Cain with runners on base.

As of 2026, this remains the Angels’ most recent postseason appearance. In addition, this was the Angels last postseason game with Anaheim in their name, as they have simply been known as the 'Los Angeles Angels' since 2016.

=== Composite line score ===
2014 ALDS (3–0): Kansas City Royals over Los Angeles Angels of Anaheim

Team	1	2	3	4	5	6	7	8	9	10	11	R	H	E
Kansas City Royals	3	1	3	2	1	1	0	0	0	0	4	15	21	1
Los Angeles Angels of Anaheim	1	0	1	1	1	1	0	1	0	0	0	6	18	2
Total attendance: 131,339 Average attendance: 43,780

== Baltimore vs. Detroit ==
=== Game 1 ===
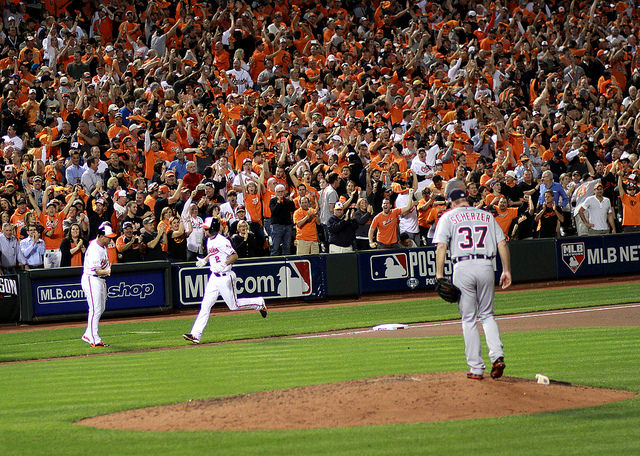
JJ Hardy rounds third base after hitting a solo home run in Game 1 of the 2014 American League Division Series.

October 2, 2014 5:37 p.m. (EDT) at Oriole Park at Camden Yards in Baltimore, Maryland 69 °F (21 °C), partly cloudy
Team	1	2	3	4	5	6	7	8	9	R	H	E
Detroit	0	2	0	0	0	0	0	1	0	3	8	2
Baltimore	2	1	0	0	0	0	1	8	X	12	12	0
WP: Chris Tillman (1–0) LP: Max Scherzer (0–1); Home runs: DET: Víctor Martínez (1), J. D. Martinez (1), Miguel Cabrera (1); BAL: Nelson Cruz (1), J. J. Hardy (1); Attendance: 47,842; Boxscore

Nelson Cruz's two-run home run in the bottom of the first started the scoring for the Orioles. The Tigers tied the score in the top of the second on back-to-back home runs by Victor Martinez and J. D. Martinez, but Baltimore pulled ahead on an RBI single by Nick Markakis in the bottom half. The score remained unchanged until Baltimore scored in the seventh on a home run from J. J. Hardy to make the score 4–2. In the top of the eighth, Ian Kinsler singled off of Darren O'Day, but was doubled off of first on a line drive by Torii Hunter. The play proved to be critical as the next batter, Miguel Cabrera, homered. In the bottom half, after a one out double by Alejandro De Aza, Joba Chamberlain relieved starter Max Scherzer and a crucial error by Andrew Romine allowed De Aza to score and Adam Jones to reach base. Jones stole second, then scored on Nelson Cruz's single. Joakim Soria relieved Chamberlain and a single and intentional walk loaded the bases before Ryan Flaherty's single and Nick Hundley's groundout scored a run each, then Jonathan Schoop's double scored two more. Phil Coke relieved Soria and threw a wild pitch that moved Schoop to third, then walked Nick Markakis before De Aza, in his second at-bat of the inning, doubled to score both men. Baltimore scored a team postseason record and LDS record eight runs in the inning. This record would be tied the next day in the Cardinals/Dodgers NLDS series. With the game out of reach, Tommy Hunter came on and pitched out of a bases loaded jam to seal the game.

=== Game 2 ===
October 3, 2014 12:07 p.m. (EDT) at Oriole Park at Camden Yards in Baltimore, Maryland 68 °F (20 °C), mostly cloudy
Team	1	2	3	4	5	6	7	8	9	R	H	E
Detroit	0	0	0	5	0	0	0	1	0	6	10	0
Baltimore	0	0	2	1	0	0	0	4	X	7	9	0
WP: Brad Brach (1–0) LP: Joakim Soria (0–1) Sv: Zach Britton (1); Home runs: DET: J. D. Martinez (2), Nick Castellanos (1); BAL: Nick Markakis (1); Attendance: 48,058; Boxscore

Nick Markakis' two-run home run off Tiger starter Justin Verlander in the third put the Orioles on the board. But in the top of the fourth, Torii Hunter singled, Cabrera doubled him to third, Victor Martinez singled to score Hunter, J. D. Martinez homered to put Detroit on top 4–2 and Nick Castellanos homered to push the lead to three runs before the first out was recorded. After the next two outs were recorded, Rajai Davis singled and chased Baltimore starter Wei-Yin Chen in the process. Kevin Gausman came on and got the final out of the inning without further damage to keep the score 5–2. A two out RBI single by J. J. Hardy cut the score to 5–3 but Verlander escaped without another run crossing the plate. The score stayed at 5–3 until the top of the eighth when Victor Martinez doubled home Hunter to push the lead back to three runs. But for the second straight day Baltimore would fight back against the Tiger bullpen in the bottom of the eighth. Joba Chamberlain came on and got De Aza to ground out, but Adam Jones was hit by a pitch, Nelson Cruz singled Jones to second, and Steve Pearce singled in Jones to make it a 6–4 game. Joakim Soria came on in relief of Chamberlain and walked Hardy to load the bases for former Tiger Delmon Young. Young unloaded the bases with a go-ahead three-run double to put the Orioles back on top 7–6. Zach Britton came on and pitched a perfect ninth to send Baltimore to Detroit up two games to none.

=== Game 3 ===
October 5, 2014 3:45 p.m. (EDT) at Comerica Park in Detroit, Michigan 53 °F (12 °C), partly cloudy
Team	1	2	3	4	5	6	7	8	9	R	H	E
Baltimore	0	0	0	0	0	2	0	0	0	2	5	1
Detroit	0	0	0	0	0	0	0	0	1	1	4	0
WP: Bud Norris (1–0) LP: David Price (0–1) Sv: Zach Britton (2); Home runs: BAL: Nelson Cruz (2); DET: None; Attendance: 43,013; Boxscore

Adam Jones' single and Nelson Cruz's two-run home run that just stayed fair down the right field line off David Price in the sixth broke a scoreless tie and the backs of the Tigers as Baltimore completed a three-game sweep. The Tigers got back-to-back leadoff doubles from Victor Martinez and J. D. Martinez in the ninth to pull within a run. After Bryan Holaday struck out, an intentional walk to Nick Castellanos put the winning run on base. Britton got Hernan Perez to ground into the game-ending, series-ending double play, sending the Orioles to their first ALCS appearance in 17 years. With the loss, the Tigers lost their first ever ALDS. In their previous four appearances, they advanced to the ALCS every time. They would not return to the postseason again until 2024. As of 2026, this remains the last postseason win for the Orioles.

=== Composite line score ===
2014 ALDS (3–0): Baltimore Orioles over Detroit Tigers

Team	1	2	3	4	5	6	7	8	9	R	H	E
Baltimore Orioles	2	1	2	1	0	2	1	12	0	21	26	1
Detroit Tigers	0	2	0	5	0	0	0	2	1	10	22	2
Total attendance: 138,913 Average attendance: 46,304

== See also ==
- 2014 National League Division Series
