= 2009 Major League Baseball All-Star Game =

2009 American baseball competition

	1	2	3	4	5	6	7	8	9	R	H	E
American League	2	0	0	0	1	0	0	1	0	4	8	1
National League	0	3	0	0	0	0	0	0	0	3	5	1
- Date: July 14, 2009
- Venue: Busch Stadium
- City: St. Louis, Missouri
- Managers: Joe Maddon (TB); Charlie Manuel (PHI)
- MVP: Carl Crawford (TB)
- Attendance: 46,760
- Ceremonial first pitch: President Barack Obama
- Television: Fox (United States); MLB International (International)
- TV announcers: Joe Buck and Tim McCarver (Fox); Dave O'Brien and Rick Sutcliffe (MLB International)
- Radio: ESPN
- Radio announcers: Dan Shulman and Dave Campbell

The 2009 Major League Baseball All-Star Game was the 80th midseason exhibition between the all-stars of the American League (AL) and the National League (NL), the two leagues comprising Major League Baseball. The game was held on July 14, 2009, at Busch Stadium in St. Louis, Missouri, the home of the National League St. Louis Cardinals. The game was the first All-Star Game held in St. Louis since 1966. This was the seventh year in which the All-Star Game determined home field advantage in the World Series, with the American League winning all seven games up to and including 2009 under this format. After the game, the National League led the series, 40–38–2, but had not won since 1996. Fox televised the contest, with Joe Buck and Tim McCarver in the booth for the game broadcast, joined at the bottom of the 2nd inning by President Barack Obama. Pre-game coverage began at 5 PM US EDT on MLB Network, with ESPN joining in at 7 PM US EDT. Outside the USA, Rogers Sportsnet (Canada) and ESPN America (Europe) carried MLB's international feed with their own video feed and announcers.

The Cardinals had hoped to use the event to show off its planned Ballpark Village residential and entertainment complex to be built on the site of the former Busch Memorial Stadium across the street from the new ballpark. However the plans had not materialized by the time of the game and the Cardinals opted to use the site for a softball field and parking lot instead.

On April 22, 2009, All-Star balloting began on MLB.com with eight position players (excluding pitchers and designated hitters) from each of the 30 teams being nominated for fans to vote. As with the prior year, only 25 email ballots could be cast and voting officially ended at 11:59 ET on July 2. Final rosters, with the exception of the final vote, were announced on July 5.

Fans voted for up to three players per league to participate in the State Farm Home Run Derby. For the first time, the batting practice sessions were telecast on the self-owned MLB Network.

By length of time, this was the shortest MLB All-Star Game (2:31) since 1988. At one point during the game, the American League retired 18 straight batters, the second most in All-Star game history.

This was the final All-Star Game in which pitchers were in the batting order, as the designated hitter rule would be in place for all All-Star Games from 2010 onward. In the second inning, the American League's Roy Halladay became the final pitcher to bat in an All-Star Game; he struck out.

== Final roster spot ==
After the rosters were revealed, a second ballot of five players per league was created for the All-Star Final Vote to determine the 33rd and final player of each roster. The NL Winner was Shane Victorino of the Philadelphia Phillies and the AL winner was Brandon Inge of the Detroit Tigers. Pablo Sandoval and Ian Kinsler finished a close second in their respective leagues.

Player	Team	Pos.	Player	Team	Pos.
American League			National League		
Brandon Inge	DET	3B	Shane Victorino	PHI	OF
Chone Figgins	LAA	3B	Cristian Guzmán	WAS	SS
Ian Kinsler	TEX	2B	Mark Reynolds	ARI	3B
Adam Lind	TOR	DH	Pablo Sandoval	SF	3B
Carlos Peña	TB	1B	Matt Kemp	LAD	OF

== Coaching staff ==
American League team manager Joe Maddon of the Tampa Bay Rays selected Kansas City Royals manager Trey Hillman and Seattle Mariners manager Don Wakamatsu as coaches for the team along with the rest of his Tampa Bay staff. Both Hillman and Wakamatsu participated in their first All-Star game this year, while Maddon managed the All-Star squad for the first time after participating as a coach in 2003.

National League manager Charlie Manuel of the Philadelphia Phillies selected Tony La Russa of the host St. Louis Cardinals and Joe Torre of the Los Angeles Dodgers as his coaches. Torre previously managed the Cardinals from 1990-1995. La Russa has managed an All-Star team five times, and led the 2005 and 2007 NL teams. This was Torre's first NL All-Star coaching position; he has managed an AL All-Star team six times. Manuel previously coached the AL All-Star team in 2002's tie game under Torre.

American League
Coach	Position	Team
Joe Maddon	Manager	Tampa Bay Rays
Don Wakamatsu	Manager	Seattle Mariners
Trey Hillman	Manager	Kansas City Royals
Dave Martinez	Bench coach	Tampa Bay Rays
Jim Hickey	Pitching coach	Tampa Bay Rays
Steve Henderson	Hitting coach	Tampa Bay Rays
Bobby Ramos	Bullpen coach	Tampa Bay Rays
George Hendrick	First base coach	Tampa Bay Rays
Tom Foley	Third base coach	Tampa Bay Rays

National League
Coach	Position	Team
Charlie Manuel	Manager	Philadelphia Phillies
Joe Torre	Manager	Los Angeles Dodgers
Tony La Russa	Manager	St. Louis Cardinals
Pete Mackanin	Bench coach	Philadelphia Phillies
Rich Dubee	Pitching coach	Philadelphia Phillies
Milt Thompson	Hitting coach	Philadelphia Phillies
Mick Billmeyer	Bullpen coach	Philadelphia Phillies
Davey Lopes	First base coach	Philadelphia Phillies
Sam Perlozzo	Third base coach	Philadelphia Phillies

== Rosters ==
Votes were cast online and at the 30 MLB ballparks. Verizon replaced Monster as the sponsor of the online portion of balloting. There was a limit of 25 votes per e-mail address, but no limit to the number of ballots cast at the stadium. The deadline to cast votes was July 2, and the results were broadcast on the TBS All-Star Selection show on July 5. Albert Pujols was the leading vote-getter in the majors with 5,397,374 votes, while Derek Jeter was the vote leader in the American League.

Players in italics have since been inducted into the National Baseball Hall of Fame.

=== American League ===
Elected starters
Position	Player	Team	All-Star Games
C	Joe Mauer	Twins	3
1B	Mark Teixeira	Yankees	2
2B	Dustin Pedroia*	Red Sox	2
3B	Evan Longoria*	Rays	2
SS	Derek Jeter	Yankees	10
OF	Jason Bay	Red Sox	3
OF	Josh Hamilton	Rangers	2
OF	Ichiro Suzuki	Mariners	9

==== Reserves ====
Pitchers
Position	Player	Team	All-Star Games
P	Andrew Bailey#	Athletics	1
P	Josh Beckett#	Red Sox	2
P	Mark Buehrle	White Sox	4
P	Brian Fuentes#	Angels	4
P	Zack Greinke	Royals	1
P	Roy Halladay	Blue Jays	6
P	Félix Hernández	Mariners	1
P	Edwin Jackson	Tigers	1
P	Joe Nathan	Twins	4
P	Jonathan Papelbon	Red Sox	4
P	Mariano Rivera	Yankees	10
P	Justin Verlander#	Tigers	2
P	Tim Wakefield#	Red Sox	1

Position Players
Position	Player	Team	All-Star Games
C	Víctor Martínez	Indians	3
1B	Justin Morneau	Twins	3
1B	Carlos Peña^{[A]}#	Rays	1
1B	Kevin Youkilis	Red Sox	2
2B	Aaron Hill	Blue Jays	1
2B	Ben Zobrist	Rays	1
3B	Chone Figgins^{[B]}#	Angels	1
3B	Brandon Inge	Tigers	1
3B	Michael Young	Rangers	6
SS	Jason Bartlett	Rays	1
OF	Carl Crawford	Rays	3
OF	Nelson Cruz^{[C]}#	Rangers	1
OF	Curtis Granderson	Tigers	1
OF	Torii Hunter#	Angels	3
OF	Adam Jones	Orioles	1

=== National League ===
Elected starters
Position	Player	Team	All-Star Games
C	Yadier Molina	Cardinals	1
1B	Albert Pujols	Cardinals	8
2B	Chase Utley	Phillies	4
3B	David Wright	Mets	4
SS	Hanley Ramírez	Marlins	2
OF	Carlos Beltrán*	Mets	5
OF	Ryan Braun	Brewers	2
OF	Raúl Ibañez	Phillies	1

==== Reserves ====
Pitchers
Position	Player	Team	All-Star Games
P	Heath Bell	Padres	1
P	Chad Billingsley	Dodgers	1
P	Jonathan Broxton#	Dodgers	1
P	Matt Cain#	Giants	1
P	Francisco Cordero	Reds	3
P	Zach Duke^{[D]}#	Pirates	1
P	Ryan Franklin	Cardinals	1
P	Dan Haren	Diamondbacks	3
P	Trevor Hoffman^{[E]}	Brewers	7
P	Josh Johnson#	Marlins	1
P	Ted Lilly#	Cubs	2
P	Tim Lincecum	Giants	2
P	Jason Marquis#	Rockies	1
P	Francisco Rodríguez	Mets	4
P	Johan Santana#	Mets	4

Position Players
Position	Player	Team	All-Star Games
C	Brian McCann	Braves	4
1B	Prince Fielder	Brewers	2
1B	Adrián González	Padres	2
1B	Ryan Howard	Phillies	2
2B	Orlando Hudson	Dodgers	2
2B	Freddy Sanchez#	Pirates	3
3B	Ryan Zimmerman	Nationals	1
SS	Miguel Tejada	Astros	6
OF	Brad Hawpe	Rockies	1
OF	Hunter Pence#	Astros	1
OF	Justin Upton	Diamondbacks	1
OF	Shane Victorino	Phillies	1
OF	Jayson Werth^{[F]}	Phillies	1

1. Carlos Peña replaced Dustin Pedroia on the roster due to family obligation; Aaron Hill replaced Pedroia as starter at second base.
2. Chone Figgins replaced Evan Longoria on the roster due to injury; Michael Young replaced Longoria as starter at third base.
3. Nelson Cruz replaced Torii Hunter on the roster due to injury.
4. Zach Duke replaced Matt Cain on the roster due to injury.
5. Trevor Hoffman replaced Jonathan Broxton on the roster due to injury.
6. Jayson Werth replaced Carlos Beltrán on the roster due to injury; Shane Victorino replaced Beltrán as starter in center field.

* This player did not start.

# This player did not play.

== Game ==
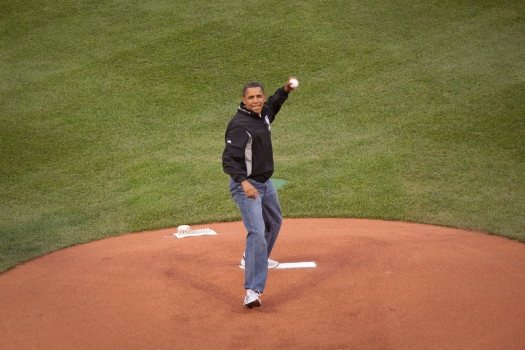
President Barack Obama throwing out the ceremonial first pitch.

=== Ceremonies ===
"The Star-Spangled Banner" was sung by Sheryl Crow for the second year in a row. Stan Musial, a former player for the host St. Louis Cardinals and a member of the Baseball Hall of Fame, gave the baseball for the ceremonial first pitch to the President of the United States Barack Obama, who threw it to the hometown Cardinals' first baseman and leading All-Star vote-getter, Albert Pujols, while wearing a White Sox jacket. During the seventh-inning stretch, Sara Evans sang "God Bless America".

By contrast, little attention was paid to the Canadian national anthem, "O Canada". An instrumental version was played through stadium speakers during the opening ceremonies, a move criticized by Canadian player Justin Morneau.

=== Starting lineups ===
American League				National League			
Order	Player	Team	Position	Order	Player	Team	Position
1	Ichiro Suzuki	Mariners	RF	1	Hanley Ramírez	Marlins	SS
2	Derek Jeter	Yankees	SS	2	Chase Utley	Phillies	2B
3	Joe Mauer	Twins	C	3	Albert Pujols	Cardinals	1B
4	Mark Teixeira	Yankees	1B	4	Ryan Braun	Brewers	RF
5	Jason Bay	Red Sox	LF	5	Raúl Ibañez	Phillies	LF
6	Josh Hamilton	Rangers	CF	6	David Wright	Mets	3B
7	Michael Young	Rangers	3B	7	Shane Victorino	Phillies	CF
8	Aaron Hill	Blue Jays	2B	8	Yadier Molina	Cardinals	C
9	Roy Halladay	Blue Jays	P	9	Tim Lincecum	Giants	P

=== Umpires ===
Pos.	Umpire	ASG Exp.
HP	Dana DeMuth	3
1B	Brian Gorman	2
2B	Jeff Kellogg	2
3B	Ángel Hernández	2
LF	Tim Timmons	1
RF	Paul Nauert	1

=== HR Derby/Bullpen Catchers ===
Catcher	League
Casey R. Moore	National
Scott Cursi	American

=== Game summary ===
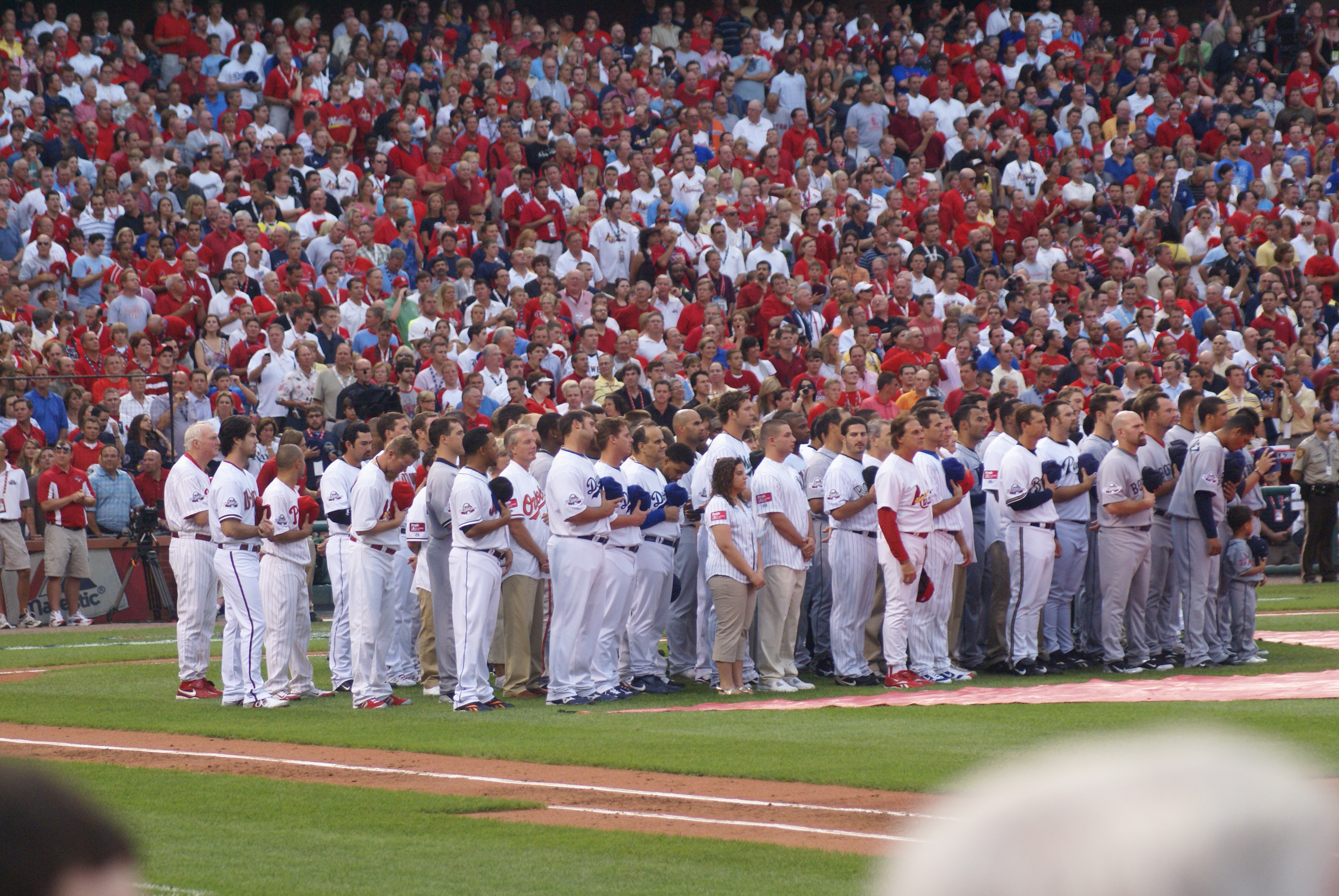

Tuesday, July 14, 2009 7:50 pm (CDT) Busch Stadium in St. Louis, Missouri
Team	1	2	3	4	5	6	7	8	9	R	H	E
American League	2	0	0	0	1	0	0	1	0	4	8	1
National League	0	3	0	0	0	0	0	0	0	3	5	1
Starting pitchers: AL: Roy Halladay; NL: Tim Lincecum; WP: Jonathan Papelbon (1–0) LP: Heath Bell (0–1) Sv: Mariano Rivera (4); Boxscore

The American League got off to a quick start in the top of the first inning by scoring two runs. Ichiro Suzuki led off the game with a single to right field, then Derek Jeter reached base on a hit-by-pitch. With one out, Mark Teixeira hit a groundball that was misplayed by first baseman Albert Pujols allowing Jeter to score the game's first run. Josh Hamilton later added an RBI groundout. The National League answered in the bottom of the second inning by scoring three runs. Singles by David Wright, Shane Victorino and Yadier Molina, plus a ground rule double by Prince Fielder, all with two outs, gave the NL the lead. The American League tied the score at three in the fifth on a two-out double by Joe Mauer off Chad Billingsley, and retook the lead when Adam Jones drove in Curtis Granderson, who tripled off Heath Bell, on a sacrifice fly in the eighth. American League pitchers at one point retired 18 straight batters (and 22 of the final 24) on just 48 pitches before Joe Nathan walked Adrián González with two outs in the eighth. Nathan, however, struck out Ryan Howard with runners on second and third to end the threat. Mariano Rivera pitched a perfect ninth inning to earn a record fourth All-Star Game save. Carl Crawford went 1-for-3 but made a great defensive catch in the seventh inning to rob Brad Hawpe of a home run. Crawford was given the MLB All-Star Game's Most Valuable Player award.

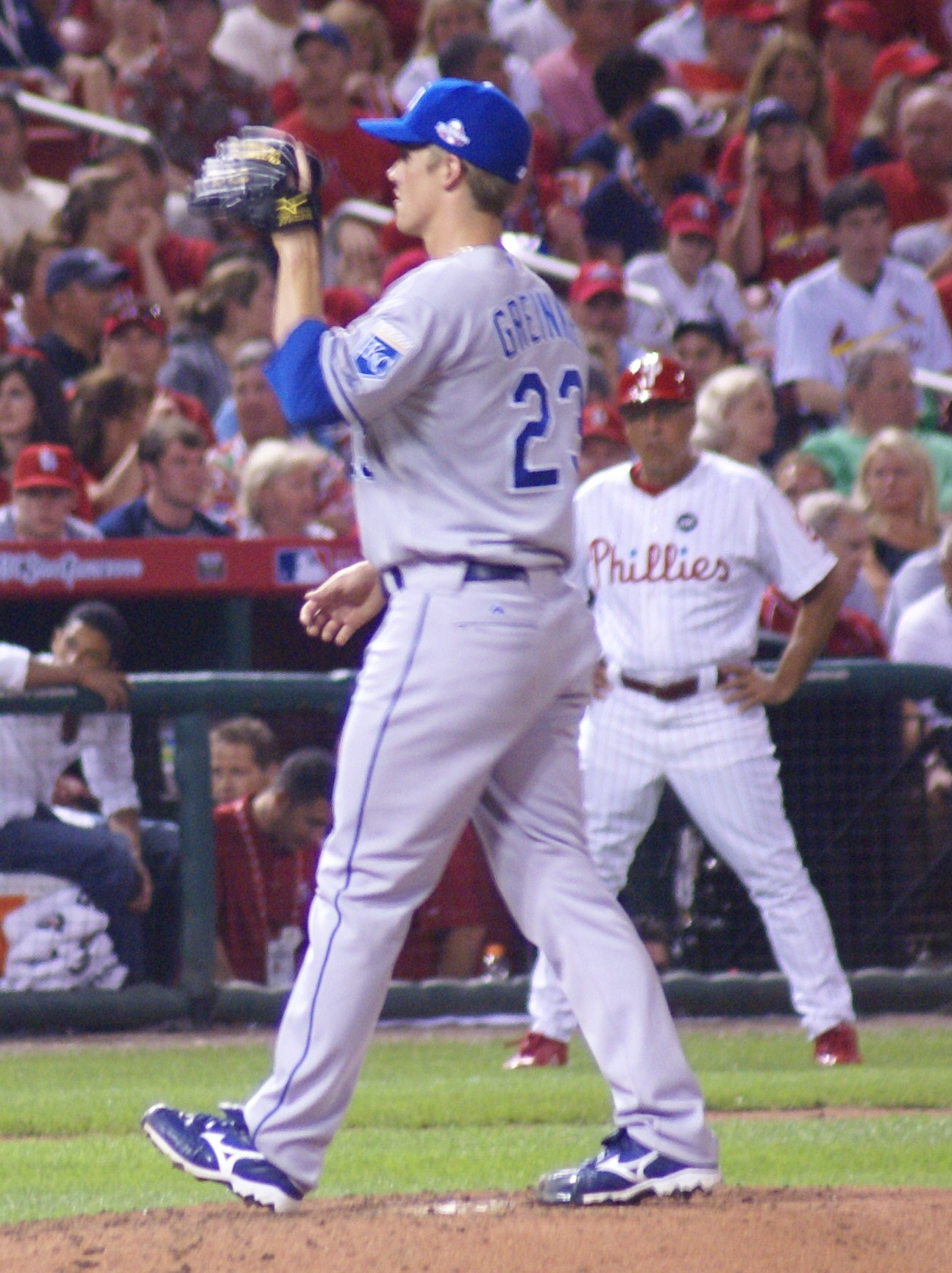
Zack Greinke on the mound.

This was the seventh straight win for the American League since the All-Star game had first been used to determine home-field advantage for the World Series. The AL improved to 12-0-1 since its 1996 defeat in Philadelphia — the longest unbeaten streak in All-Star history. It was also the first All-Star game without a home run by either league since the 1999 Midsummer Classic in Fenway Park.

== Related events ==
- The All-Star Fan Fest, an amusement park and a quasi-museum, was held July 10–14 at America's Center.
- The Pepsi All-Star Concert, one of two new events on the calendar, featuring St. Louis native Sheryl Crow, was held at the Gateway Arch on July 11.
- The Sirius XM Radio All-Star Futures Game and the Taco Bell All-Star Legends and Celebrity Softball Game were held July 12 at Busch Stadium. The World team won the Futures game, 7-5 after seven innings due to rain. Another new event, The Sports Authority/Nike 5K Race and Fun Run, was also held.
- The Gatorade Workout Day and State Farm Home Run Derby took place at Busch Stadium on July 13. Prince Fielder defeated Nelson Cruz in the final round to win the Home Run Derby.
- The Chevrolet Red Carpet All-Star Parade was held on the day of the game in front of Busch Stadium, and carried on MLB Network via tape delay.
- Hall of Famer Stan Musial gave the ceremonial first pitch to United States President Barack Obama to throw to the St. Louis Cardinals' Albert Pujols. President Obama thus became the first sitting president to do so since Gerald Ford in 1976.

== Broadcasters ==
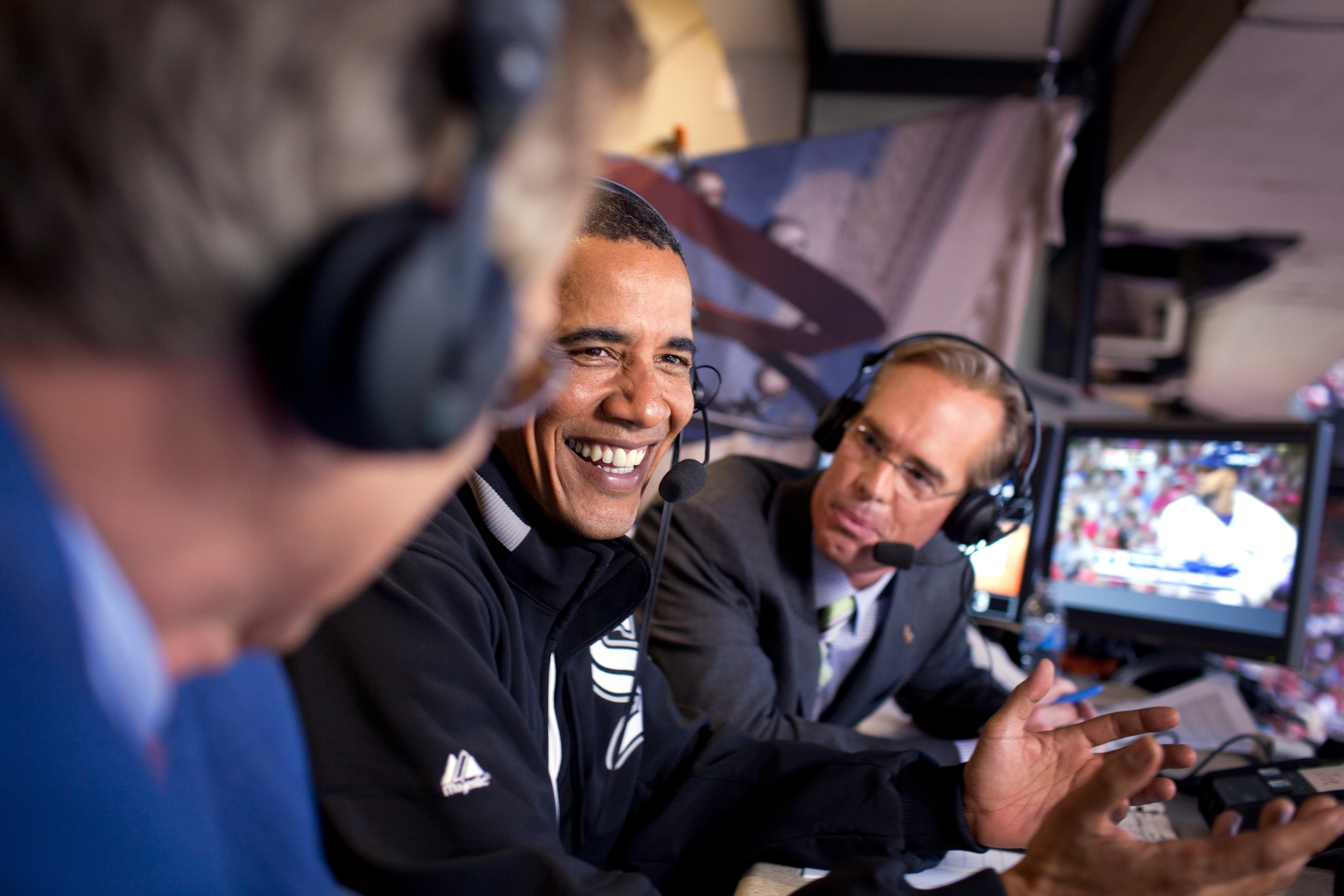
Joe Buck (right) with President Barack Obama (center) and Tim McCarver (left) during the 2009 MLB All-Star Game.

The game was televised live in the United States, and in Canada through the Fox Network by Fox Sports, with announcers Joe Buck (play-by-play); Tim McCarver (color commentator); and Ken Rosenthal, Chris Rose, and Eric Karros (field reporters). MLB International televised the game in English outside of the U.S., with announcers Gary Thorne (play-by-play) and Rick Sutcliffe (color commentator). The American Forces Network also carried the game to U.S. service personnel stationed around the globe.

ESPN Radio broadcast the game, with Dan Shulman (play-by-play) and Dave Campbell (color commentator). Peter Pascarelli and John Rooney served as field reporters.
