= Jeff Kellogg =

American baseball umpire (born 1961)

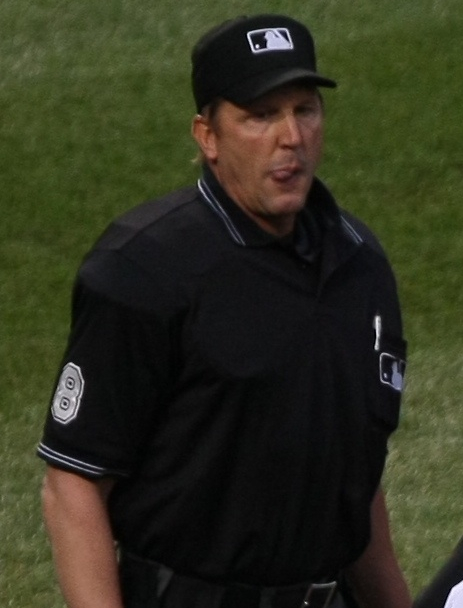
- Kellogg in 2009
- Born: August 29, 1961 (age 64); Coldwater, Michigan, U.S.

debut
- June 12, 1991

Last appearance
- June 27, 2019

Career highlights and awards
- Special Assignments: All-Star Games (1997, 2009); Wild Card Games (2012); Division Series (1998, 2000, 2003, 2007, 2008, 2010, 2011, 2014, 2016); League Championship Series (1999, 2001, 2002, 2004, 2006, 2012); World Series (2000, 2003, 2008, 2010, 2014)

Jeffrey William Kellogg (born August 29, 1961) is an American retired Major League Baseball umpire who worked in the National League from 1991 to 1999 and throughout both major leagues from 2000 to 2019. He wore uniform number 8, formerly worn in the NL by Hall of Fame umpire Doug Harvey from 1962 to 1992.

== Umpiring career ==
Kellogg umpired in two Major League Baseball All-Star Games (1997, 2009), eight Division Series (1998, 2000, 2003, 2007, 2008, 2010, 2011, 2014, 2016), six League Championship Series (1999, 2001, 2002, 2004, 2006, 2012), and five World Series (2000, 2003, 2008, 2010, 2014 - as Crew Chief).

He was promoted to crew chief in 2010 and assigned Crew G with Larry Vanover, Jeff Nelson and Mark Carlson.

=== Notable games ===
On September 14, 1997, Kellogg was umpiring first base when he ran across the field and ejected Montreal Expos' trainer Ron McClain, after which the two bumped chests. McClain had been upset by home plate umpire Larry Vanover's badly blown call at home plate calling out David Segui, who should have scored the game-tying run in the ninth inning.

Kellogg was behind the plate in 2006 when Aníbal Sánchez threw a no-hitter. He was also the plate umpire for Ubaldo Jiménez's no-hitter in 2010. In both games, Miguel Olivo was the catcher.

Kellogg was the third base umpire for Mark Buehrle's no-hitter against the Texas Rangers on April 18, 2007.

Kellogg was the home plate umpire for Trevor Hoffman’s 500th save on June 6, 2007, ending the game on a called third strike.

Kellogg was umpiring at second base when Randy Johnson reached the 300 win milestone on June 4, 2009.

On April 27, 2012, in a game between the Baltimore Orioles and Oakland A's, Kellogg tackled a shirtless man who had run onto the field and slid into home plate at Oriole Park at Camden Yards after the man had eluded Baltimore police for nearly two minutes.

Kellogg was chosen to serve as the crew chief for the one-game Wild Card playoff between the Atlanta Braves and the St. Louis Cardinals on October 5, 2012. That was the game when left field umpire Sam Holbrook called a highly controversial infield fly rule on an outfield fly struck by Andrelton Simmons.

Kellogg was the second base umpire when Albert Pujols of the Los Angeles Angels hit his 600th career home run against the Minnesota Twins on June 3, 2017.

== Personal life ==
Kellogg resides in Michigan, and received a B.S. in criminal justice from Ferris State University in Big Rapids, Michigan. Kellog's wife, Pam is the sister of former Major League Umpires Tim and Bill Welke.

== See also ==
- List of Major League Baseball umpires (disambiguation)
