= Jeff Nelson (umpire) =

American baseball umpire (born 1965)

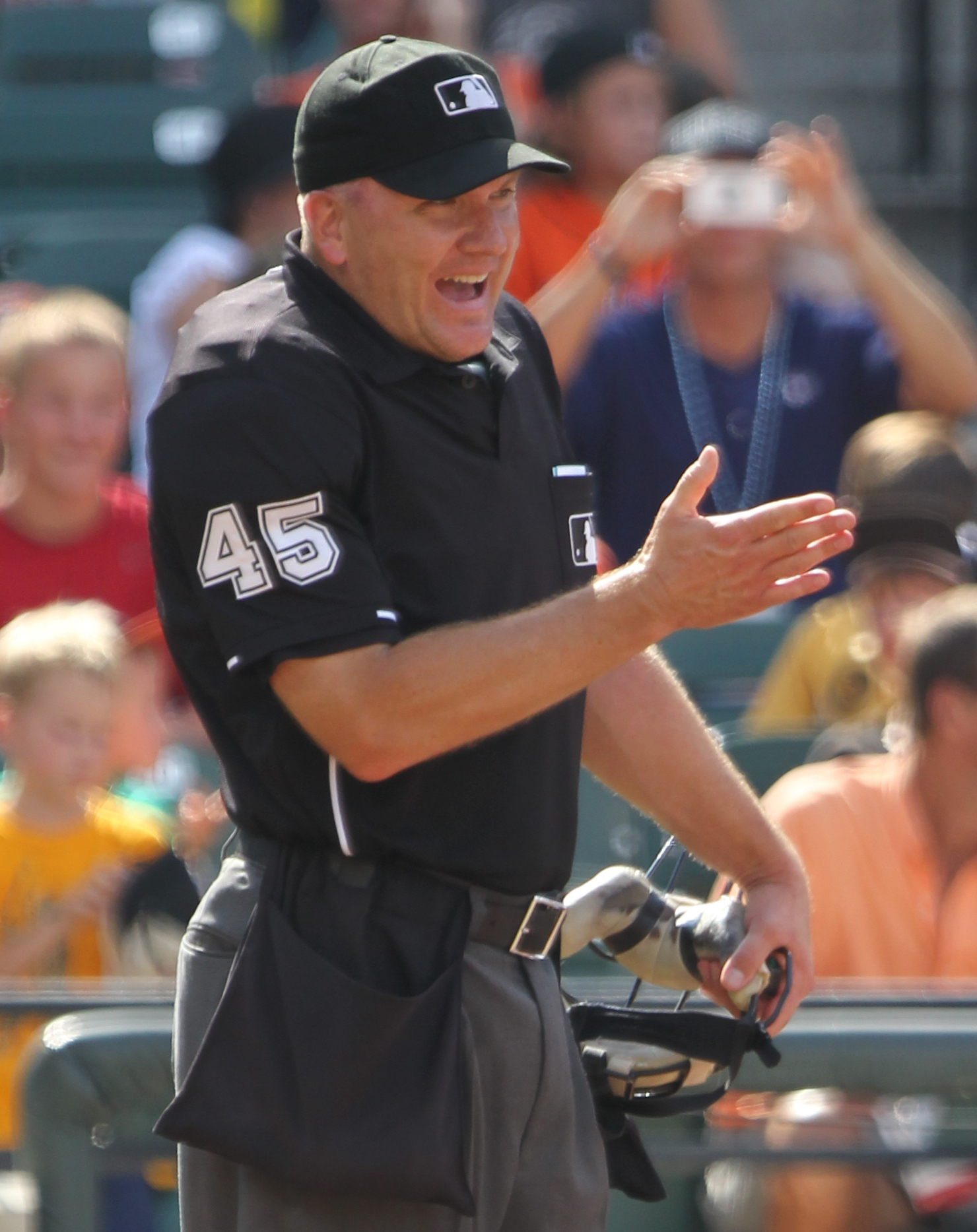
- Nelson in 2011.
- Born: June 1, 1965 (age 60); Saint Paul, Minnesota, U.S.

MLB debut
- May 9, 1997

Last appearance
- October 1, 2023

Career highlights and awards
- Special Assignments: All-Star Games (2006, 2014); Wild Card Games/Series (2012, 2015, 2016, 2019, 2020, 2022); Division Series (2000, 2001, 2005, 2008, 2009, 2014, 2017, 2018); League Championship Series (2002, 2004, 2010, 2011, 2012, 2015, 2016, 2019, 2020); World Series (2005, 2009, 2014, 2018); Field of Dreams Game (2021)

Jeffrey Brian Nelson (born June 1, 1965) is an American former professional baseball umpire in Major League Baseball (MLB), who was named to the National League (NL) staff prior to the 1999 season, and worked in both major leagues from 2000 until his retirement after the 2023 regular season.

A graduate of Bethel University in St. Paul, Minnesota, he wore uniform number 45. Nelson was a crew chief from 2014 to 2023.

== Umpiring career ==
Nelson was named as the Top Prospect at the Joe Brinkman Umpiring School in 1989.

He was promoted to the National League prior to the 1999 season along with Paul Nauert to fill vacancies left by the retirements of Jim Quick and Harry Wendelstedt.

While in the minor leagues, Nelson was the chief rules instructor at the former Brinkman-Froemming umpire school in Cocoa, Florida from 1997 until the school's closing in 1998. He continues to teach at umpire clinics in the off-season. Additionally, Nelson is currently the secretary/treasurer of the major league umpires' union, the Major League Baseball Umpires Association.

Nelson retired prior to the 2024 season, and Chris Guccione succeeded him as crew chief.

=== Notable games ===
Nelson received several postseason assignments, including the 2005 World Series, 2009 World Series, 2014 World Series, and the 2018 World Series. He also worked the League Championship Series in 2002, 2004, 2010, 2011, 2012, 2015, 2016, 2019, and 2020; the Division Series in 2000, 2001, 2005, 2008, 2009, 2014, 2017, and 2018; and Wild Card games in 2012, 2015, 2016, 2019, 2020, and 2022. Nelson also umpired in the 2006 and 2014 MLB All-Star Games.

Nelson was behind home plate when Mark McGwire hit his 500th home run in 1999 and when Rickey Henderson hit his 3,000th hit in 2001.

Nelson served as the second base umpire when Chicago Cubs pitcher Carlos Zambrano threw a no-hitter against the Houston Astros at Miller Park on September 14, 2008.

Nelson was the plate umpire on September 27, 2012, when Tigers pitcher Doug Fister set an American League record by striking out nine consecutive batters.

During Game 2 of the 2012 American League Championship Series, Nelson ejected New York Yankees manager Joe Girardi for arguing a missed call at second base after Nelson incorrectly ruled Detroit Tigers infielder Omar Infante was safe. Nelson later acknowledged his safe call was wrong.

Nelson worked home plate for Game 7 of the 2014 World Series between the San Francisco Giants and the Kansas City Royals.

Nelson was the plate umpire for the Baltimore Orioles-Seattle Mariners game on August 12, 2015, when Mariners pitcher Hisashi Iwakuma threw a no-hitter.

Nelson was the home plate umpire for the 2015 National League Wild Card Game between the Chicago Cubs and Pittsburgh Pirates.

While working home plate during Game 3 of the 2019 American League Championship Series, Nelson took two foul balls off his mask and was forced to leave the game after the fourth inning due to suffering a concussion. He would miss the remainder of the series and was replaced by Mike Everitt.

== See also ==
- List of Major League Baseball umpires (disambiguation)
