= Torii Hunter =

American baseball player (born 1975)

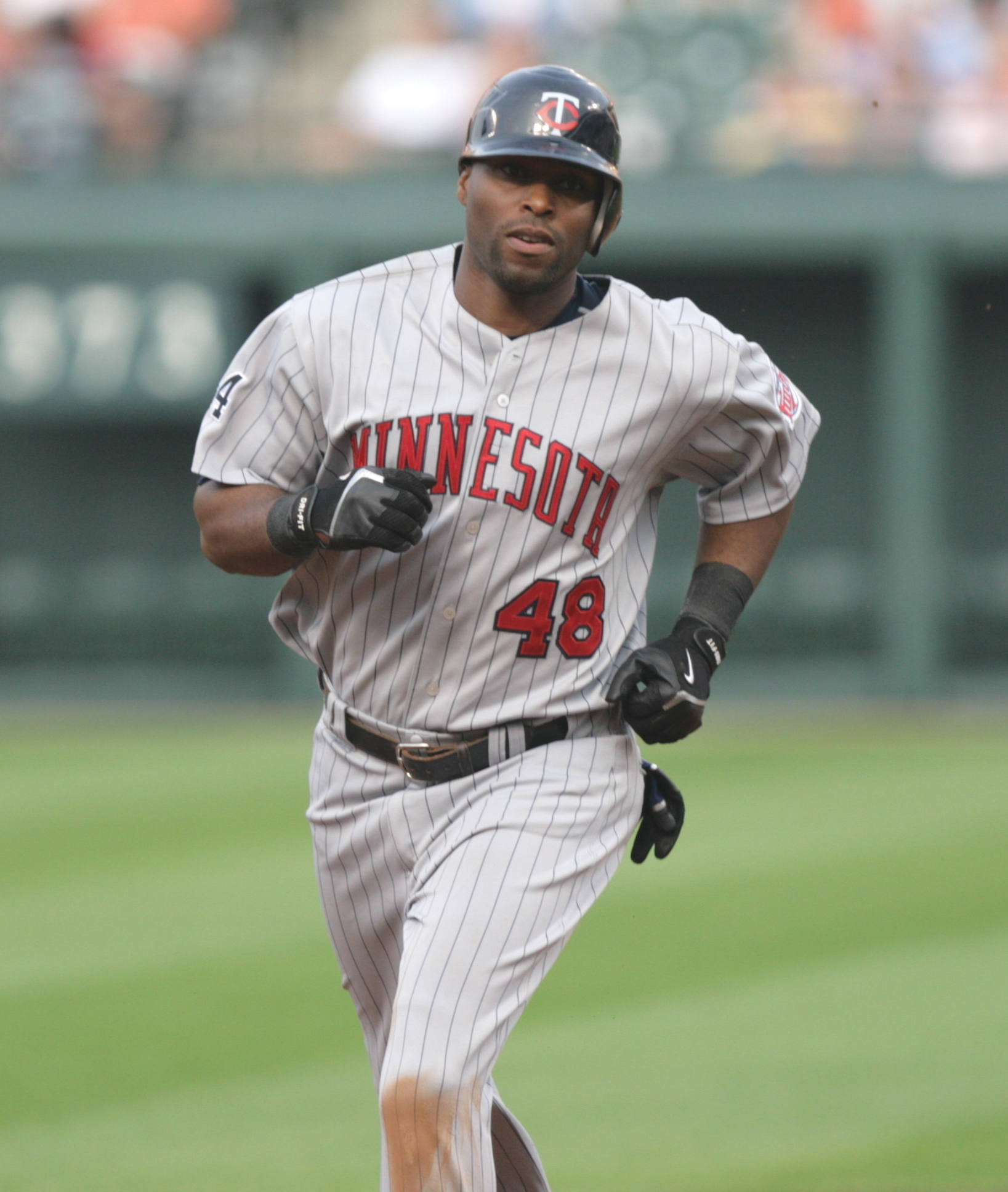
- Hunter with the Minnesota Twins in 2006
- Outfielder
- Born: July 18, 1975 (age 51); Pine Bluff, Arkansas, U.S.
- Batted: Right Threw: Right

MLB debut
- August 22, 1997, for the Minnesota Twins

Last MLB appearance
- October 3, 2015, for the Minnesota Twins

MLB statistics
- Batting average: .277
- Hits: 2,452
- Home runs: 353
- Runs batted in: 1,391
- Stats at Baseball Reference

Teams
- Minnesota Twins (1997–2007); Los Angeles Angels of Anaheim (2008–2012); Detroit Tigers (2013–2014); Minnesota Twins (2015)

Career highlights and awards
- 5× All-Star (2002, 2007, 2009, 2010, 2013); 9× Gold Glove Award (2001–2009); 2× Silver Slugger Award (2009, 2013); Minnesota Twins Hall of Fame

Torii Kedar Hunter (/ˈtɔːriː/; born July 18, 1975) is an American former professional baseball center fielder and right fielder. Hunter currently serves as Special Assistant to Los Angeles Angels general manager Perry Minasian. He played in Major League Baseball (MLB) for the Minnesota Twins, Los Angeles Angels of Anaheim, and Detroit Tigers from 1997 through 2015. Hunter was a five-time All-Star, won nine consecutive Gold Glove Awards as a center fielder, and was a two-time Silver Slugger Award winner.

== High school career ==
Born and raised in Pine Bluff, Arkansas, Hunter attended Pine Bluff High School. Hunter, along with his three brothers, lived in a downtown and fairly impoverished neighborhood just off Main Street. Hunter began playing baseball at the age of eight and football a few years later, excelling as both a quarterback and a free safety. At Pine Bluff High, Hunter excelled in baseball, football, basketball, and track. Early on in high school, Hunter was a stand-out in sports other than baseball, but would receive All-State honors for his junior and senior seasons. According to the head coach of the team, Hunter once hit a ball 550 feet (170 m) for a home run. In 1992, Hunter made the U.S. Junior Olympic team, and when he struggled to pay the $500 fee for the team, Hunter wrote then-governor of Arkansas Bill Clinton a letter asking for help, which Clinton accepted. Hunter had the option of attending The University of Arkansas to play baseball, but opted to play professional baseball instead.

== Professional career ==
=== Minnesota Twins ===
The Twins selected Hunter with the 20th overall pick in the 1993 draft using a compensation pick from the Cincinnati Reds for signing John Smiley. Hunter made his debut with the Twins as a pinch runner in Baltimore on August 22, 1997. It was not until 1999 that Hunter began starting regularly, playing in 135 games for the Twins. He finished with only one error in 292 chances in the outfield.

Hunter exploded onto the scene in the beginning of April in 2000, but his batting average dropped to .207 by the end of May. He was subsequently sent down to Triple-A Salt Lake to work on his mechanics at the plate; however with Hunter's new approach at the plate, he caught fire in the month of June, capping it with a two-home run, seven-RBI game and being named the Twins' Minor League Player of the Week and Player of the Month. After a 16-game hitting streak, four consecutive games with home runs and three grand slams, Hunter was recalled by the Twins on July 28. Hunter was named both Best Defensive Outfielder and Most Exciting Player in Pacific Coast League by Baseball America for 2000.

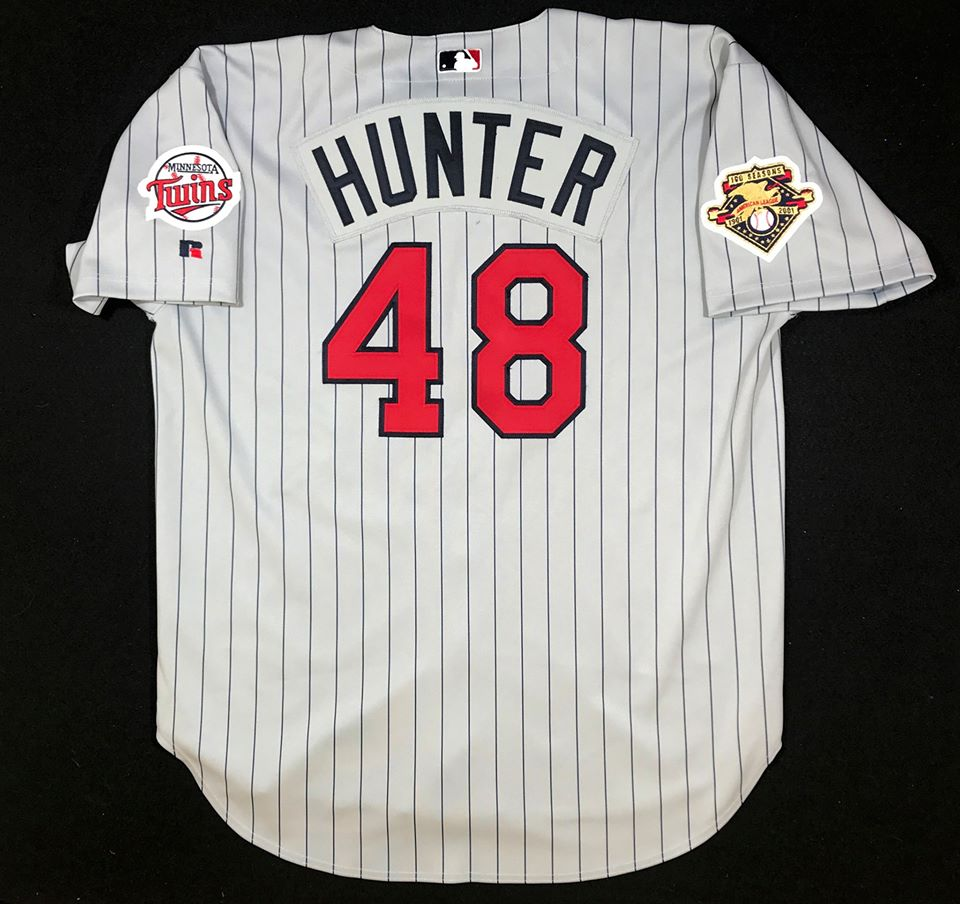
2001 Minnesota Twins #48 Torii Hunter road jersey

In 2001, Hunter led the Twins in at bats, home runs and outfield assists (with 14 – tied for second best in the league), and was second in RBI and total bases, leading the Twins to their first winning season since 1992. Hunter led all major league center fielders in range factor (3.29), and was named Best Defensive Outfielder in the American League by Baseball America. He also won his first Rawlings Gold Glove Award in 2001.

In 2002, Hunter began to post near-MVP numbers, and was a contender for the award a good portion of the year. In the month of April, he went 39–105 (a .371 average) with nine home runs and 20 RBI, winning American League Player of the Month honors.

Hunter was selected by the fans to his first All-Star Game, in Milwaukee in 2002, becoming the first Twin since Kirby Puckett in 1995 to start an All-Star game in center field. One of the biggest moments came in the first inning, when, with two outs, Barry Bonds sent what appeared to be a towering home run to right-center field. Hunter, who had built a reputation for his outfield thievery in the American League, jumped and caught the ball over the wall (accomplishing a personal goal he set of robbing one from Bonds). Although there were no awards given at the All-Star game, because the game ended in a tie, the catch was later awarded as the This Year in Baseball Best Defensive Play of the Year by the fans.

Hunter, along with an improved team and solid bullpen pitching, led a resurgence in the latter half of the season which powered the Twins to win the American League Central Division. The team advanced to the ALCS, where they lost to the Anaheim Angels four games to one. The Angels went on to win their first World Series championship.

Hunter led the club in home runs, RBIs, and stolen bases, and was tied for the lead in games and doubles. He won the team's Calvin R. Griffith Award as Most Valuable Twin for 2002. He ended the season sixth in the MVP voting, and also earned his second Gold Glove in center field. Hunter was voted baseball's Best Defensive Player Award for 2002 by the fans.

Hunter struggled offensively in 2003. Although he played in a career high 154 games, he often struggled at the plate, achieving an OPS of .763 and a batting average of just .250, .039 lower than in 2002. He stole just six bases, while being thrown out seven times. His defense was still strong enough to win his third straight Gold Glove for his play in center field.

Hunter missed much of the 2005 season after breaking his ankle and tearing ligaments when he attempted to scale the right field wall in Fenway Park on July 29. Despite playing essentially only half a season, Hunter was awarded his fifth consecutive Gold Glove.

On the last day of the 2006 regular season, Hunter hit his career-high 31st home run, helping the Twins to their fourth division title in five years.

On October 10, the Twins notified Hunter that they had picked up his $12 million option for the 2007 season, keeping him from becoming a free agent.

=== Los Angeles Angels of Anaheim ===
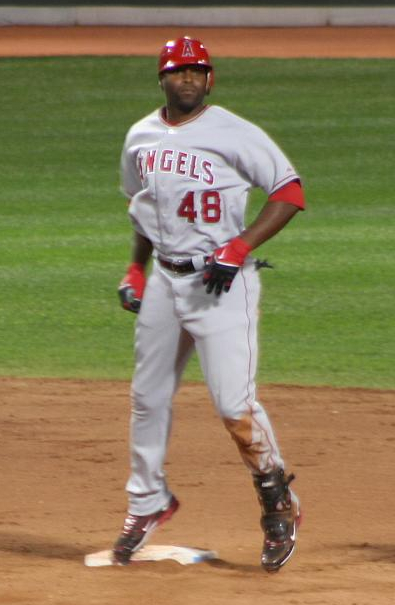
Hunter on second base for the Los Angeles Angels of Anaheim in 2008

After turning down a three-year, $45 million deal in August 2007 from the Twins, Hunter signed a five-year contract with the Los Angeles Angels of Anaheim worth $90 million. He replaced Gary Matthews Jr. as the everyday center fielder.

In 2009, he was named #44 on the Sporting News list of the 50 greatest current players in baseball. A panel of 100 baseball people, many of them members of the Baseball Hall of Fame and winners of major baseball awards, were polled to arrive at the list.

Hunter hit three home runs in one game against the San Diego Padres on June 13, 2009. It was the first time in his career he had accomplished the feat. Hunter was selected to represent Los Angeles in the 2009 All-Star Game, making his third appearance, but he was unable to participate. He was on the disabled list because he had crashed into the outfield wall at Dodger Stadium and at AT&T Park, separating his right shoulder. This sidelined him for more than a month.

Hunter batted .299 with 22 homers and 90 RBIs in 2009. After the 2009 season, Hunter won his ninth consecutive Gold Glove award for the outfield, and a Silver Slugger Award.

On September 2, 2011, Hunter said in an interview with the Minneapolis Star-Tribune that he wanted to retire as a member of the Angels, but he became a free agent following the 2012 season.

=== Detroit Tigers ===
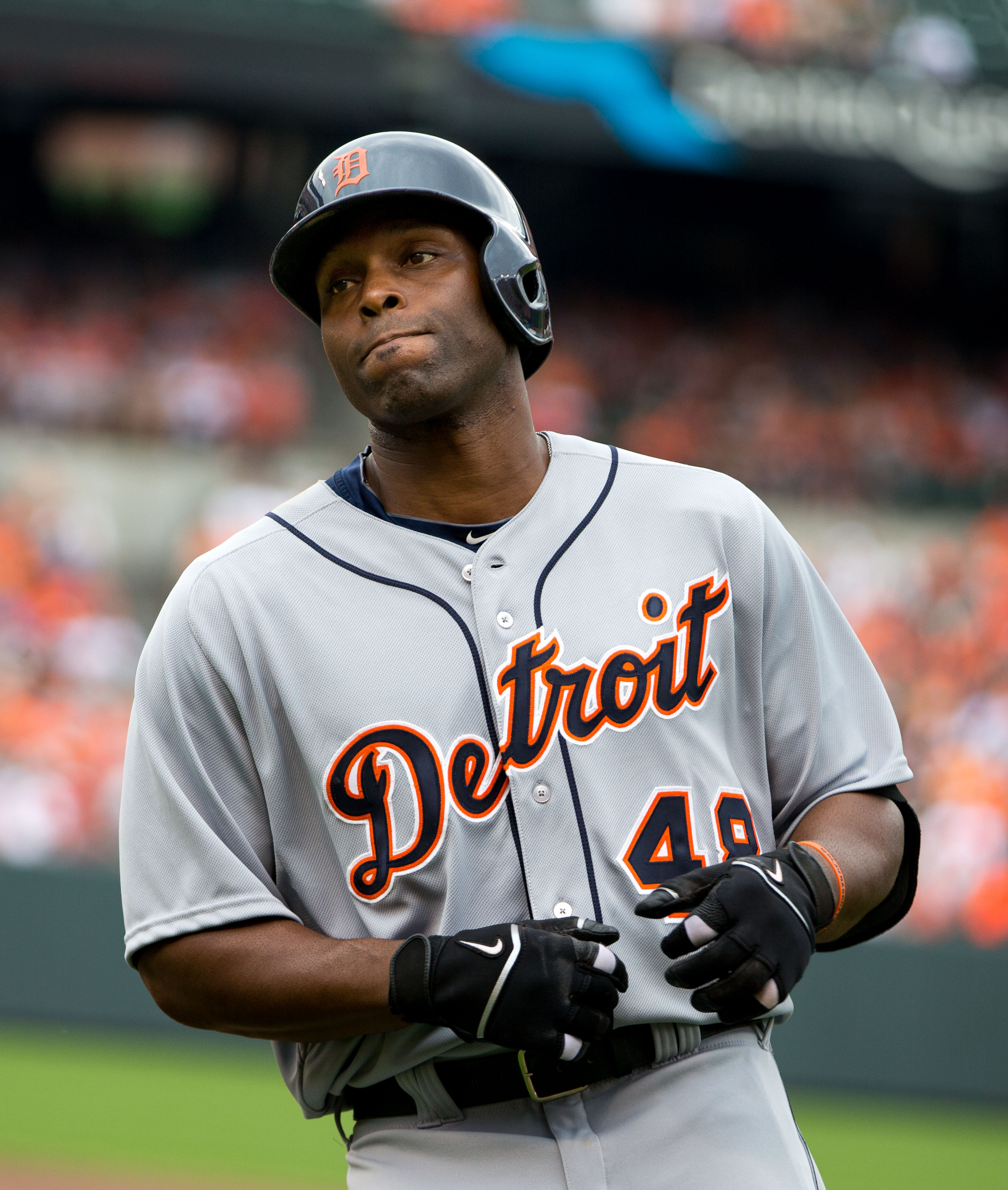
Hunter with the Detroit Tigers in 2013

On November 14, 2012, it was announced that Hunter and the Detroit Tigers had reached a two-year agreement worth $26 million. He would be playing right field and batting second for most of the season. After Hunter signed with the Tigers, pitcher Rick Porcello let him have #48, which Hunter has worn for his entire career, and Porcello changed his uniform to #21.

On June 16, 2013, Hunter hit his 300th career home run in a game against the Minnesota Twins, in the city where his major league career started (Minneapolis). On July 1, Hunter was voted in as a reserve outfielder in the AL player voting for the 2013 Major League All-Star Game. It was his fifth career All-Star selection. As of the All-Star break, Torii was hitting .315 with seven home runs and 44 RBIs.

Hunter finished the 2013 regular season with a .304 batting average, 17 home runs and 84 RBIs. Batting in front of Miguel Cabrera for most of the season, Torii was walked only 26 times, helping him to the highest at-bats total of his major league career (606), as well as a career-high 184 hits.

In Game 2 of the ALCS Hunter injured himself flipping over the low Fenway Park bullpen wall in pursuit of a David Ortiz game-tying grand slam.

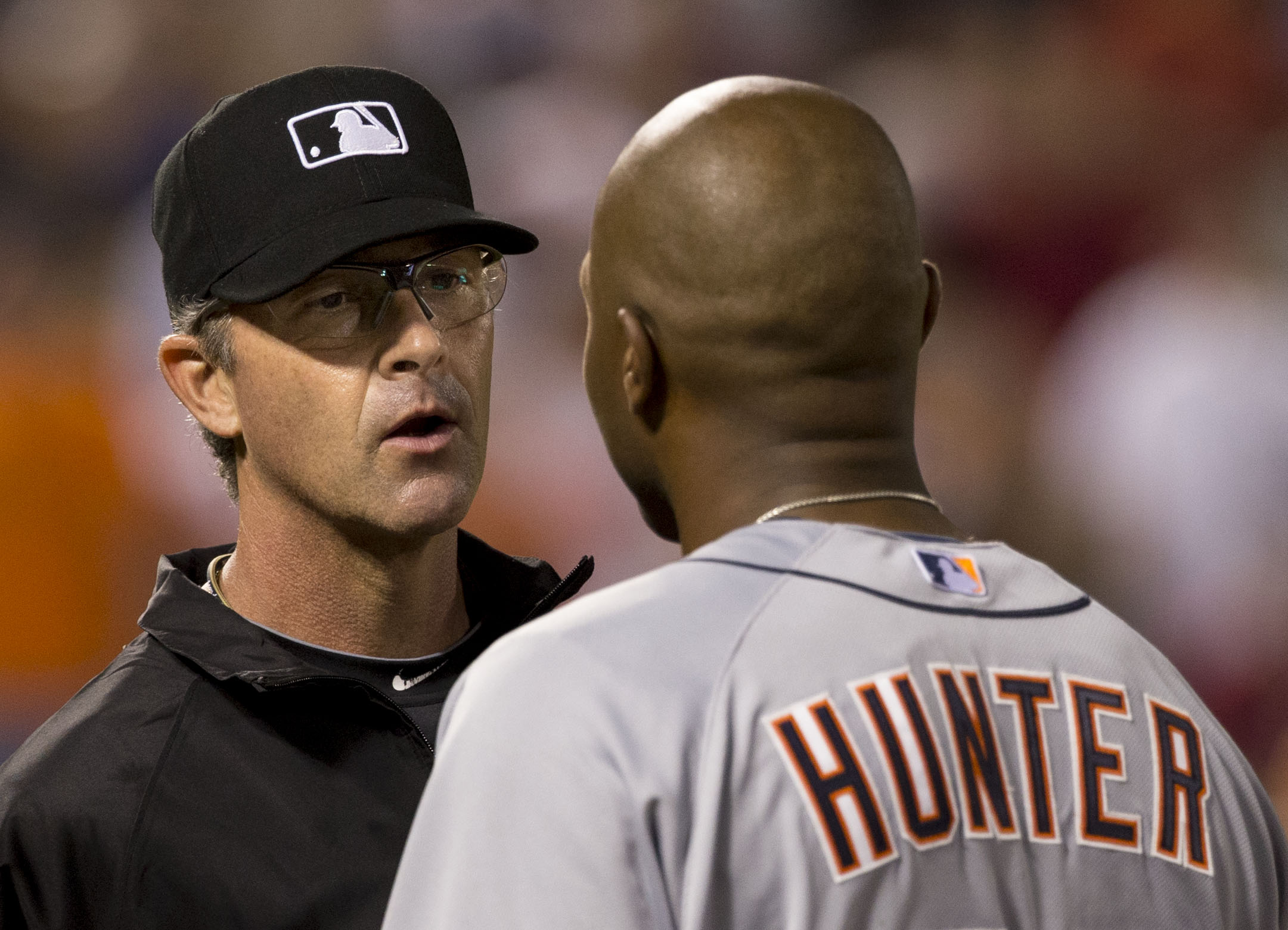
Umpire Paul Nauert with Hunter following an altercation in Baltimore on May 12, 2014.

On May 12, 2014, the normally easygoing Hunter had a heated exchange with Baltimore Orioles hurler Bud Norris after Norris hit Hunter in the ribs with a fastball during a 4–1 Tiger win at Oriole Park at Camden Yards, sparking a bench-clearing incident. The two continued shouting at each other as Norris headed to the dugout after being ejected. Hunter was hitting .298 for the 2014 season at the conclusion of that contest.

Hunter finished the 2014 regular season with a .286 batting average, 17 home runs, and 83 RBIs.

=== Return to the Minnesota Twins ===
On December 2, 2014, Hunter agreed to a one-year deal worth $10.5 million with the Minnesota Twins, with whom he had previously played from 1997 to 2007. The deal became official on December 3, 2014. During a game on June 10, 2015, Hunter was ejected by umpire Mark Ripperger and reacted by heaving pieces of equipment and then taking off his uniform shirt and throwing it to the ground. Hunter received a two-game suspension for his actions. Over his final season, Hunter batted .240, hit 22 homers, and drove in 81 runs.

On October 26, 2015, Hunter announced his retirement from baseball.

=== Career statistics ===
In 2372 games over 19 seasons, Hunter posted a .277 batting average (2452-for-8857) with 1296 runs, 498 doubles, 39 triples, 353 home runs, 1391 RBI, 195 stolen bases, 661 bases on balls, .331 on-base percentage and .461 slugging percentage. He finished his career with a .990 fielding percentage playing primarily at center and right field. In 48 postseason games, he hit .274 (51-for-186) with 26 runs, 12 doubles, 4 home runs, 20 RBI and 17 walks.

== Highlights, records, and notable statistics ==
Hunter began the 2007 season with one of the fastest starts to a season in his career, featuring a 23-game hitting streak starting in mid-April and ending on May 10. In 2007, Hunter also hit three grand slams: April 17 in Seattle, May 18 in Milwaukee, and August 15 again in Seattle.

Hunter has been awarded nine consecutive American League Gold Glove Awards (2001–2009) for his defensive talents in center field, and he has been selected to the All-Star Game five times.

On May 30, 2011, Hunter collected his 1,000th RBI off of Joakim Soria, which was also a go-ahead two-run home run to give the Angels a 9–8 lead, a game which they eventually won 10–8. Hunter was the 268th person to collect 1,000 RBI

On August 15, 2012, Hunter was sliding home when he accidentally slashed umpire Greg Gibson by his left eye with his rubber cleats. Gibson was not seriously injured. Hunter noted that he had been wearing metal cleats on Sunday and Monday, but had switched to rubber cleats the previous day.

On June 16, 2013, Hunter hit his 300th career home run off Twins pitcher P. J. Walters.

MLB
| Accomplishment | Record | Refs |
Regular season
| 7th Most Gold Gloves by an OF | 9 (2001–2009) | |

Twins records
| Accomplishment | Record | Refs |
Regular season
| Most 20/20 seasons | 2 (2002, 2004) | |
| 2nd most Gold Gloves (Note: Only behind Jim Kaat who had 16 Gold Gloves at pitcher.) | 7 (2001–2007) | |
| 2nd highest career Power-Speed # (Note: 2nd to HOFer Kirby Puckett.) | 152.2 | |
| 10th best career At Bats per Home Run | 23.4 | |

== Charity ==
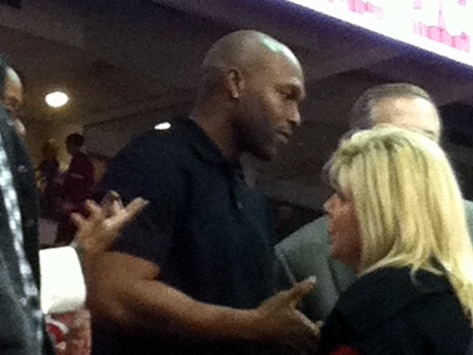
Hunter prior to an Arkansas Razorbacks men's basketball game against Michigan in Bud Walton Arena

Hunter contributes to many charities, including the "Torii Hunter Project Education Initiative", which provides college scholarships to students in California, Arkansas, Nevada and Minnesota, the Andre Agassi College Preparatory Academy in Las Vegas, a partnership with Major League Baseball to help maintain and improve baseball diamonds in inner cities, the Big Brothers and the Prostate Cancer Foundation, and in addition, Hunter helped fund construction of a youth softball field in Placentia, California in 2008. This work has resulted in Hunter being presented with the Branch Rickey Award in 2009, which rewards excellence in charity work.

== Controversy ==
In a discussion about the number of black players in the Major Leagues, Hunter said during a USA Today-hosted committee to improve baseball panel that black Latinos do not count. "People see dark faces out there, and the perception is that they're African-American. They're not us. They're impostors. Even people I know come up and say: 'Hey, what color is Vladimir Guerrero? Is he a black player?' I say, 'Come on, he's Dominican. He's not black.' ... As African-American players, we have a theory that baseball can go get an imitator and pass them off as us. It's like they had to get some kind of dark faces, so they go to the Dominican or Venezuela because you can get them cheaper. It's like, 'Why should I get this kid from the South Side of Chicago and have Scott Boras represent him and pay him $5 million when you can get a Dominican guy for a bag of chips?' ... I'm telling you, it's sad." Though Hunter does not dispute the accuracy of the quotes, he has insisted that these statements merely distinguish between different cultures and do not reflect negative feelings toward other races.

== Personal life ==
Hunter resides during the off-season in the Dallas-Fort Worth Metroplex suburb of Prosper, Texas with his wife Katrina, whom he met in high school. He is a cousin of former MLB outfielder Choo Freeman. Despite the same spelling, Hunter was not named after torii, the gates to a Japanese Shinto shrine. Hunter says jokingly, "I think, when my mom filled out the paperwork after I was born, she accidentally put two 'I's." Hunter is a Christian.

His older son, Torii Jr., played football and baseball at Notre Dame beginning in 2013. Torii Jr. played baseball professionally in the Angels organization after being selected by the team in the 23rd round of the 2016 MLB draft. His younger son, Monshadrik Hunter, is a defensive back in the Canadian Football League.

In 2012, Hunter's son, Darius McClinton-Hunter, was arrested and accused of sexual assault. A grand jury declined to indict McClinton-Hunter on the grounds of insufficient evidence. The accuser recanted her claims first in a recorded telephone conversation and again in a deposition for a $10 million lawsuit Darius McClinton-Hunter filed against her for her false allegations. Hunter, playing for the Angels at the time, took a 14-game hiatus in the wake of his son's arrest.

Hunter endorsed gubernatorial candidate Asa Hutchinson in his successful attempt to become governor of Arkansas, citing their shared desire of "keeping marriage between one man and one woman."

Hunter once indicated that he would be uncomfortable with having a homosexual teammate, due to his biblical upbringing. However, he later apologized for his comments.

== See also ==
- List of Major League Baseball career home run leaders
- List of Major League Baseball career stolen bases leaders
- List of Major League Baseball career runs batted in leaders
- List of Major League Baseball career total bases leaders
- List of Major League Baseball career games played leaders
- List of Major League Baseball career doubles leaders
- List of Major League Baseball career hits leaders
- List of Major League Baseball career extra base hits leaders
- List of Major League Baseball career putouts as a center fielder leaders
- 2021 Baseball Hall of Fame balloting

| Preceded by Eric Chavez | American League Player of the Month; April 2002 | Succeeded by Jason Giambi |
| Preceded by Albert Pujols | Players Choice Marvin Miller Man of the Year; 2007 | Succeeded by Michael Young |
