= 2009 Major League Baseball Home Run Derby =

Baseball competition

- Date: July 13, 2009
- Venue: Busch Stadium
- City: St. Louis, Missouri
- Winner: Prince Fielder

The 2009 Major League Baseball Home Run Derby (known through sponsorship as the State Farm Home Run Derby) was a home run hitting contest in Major League Baseball (MLB) between four batters each from the National League and American League. The derby was held on July 13, 2009, at Busch Stadium in St. Louis, Missouri, the host location of the 2009 MLB All-Star Game. ESPN (United States), Rogers Sportsnet (Canada), and ESPN America (Europe) telecast the event, while ESPN Radio broadcast on radio.

The winner of the event was Prince Fielder of the Milwaukee Brewers.

== Participants ==
American League	National League
Nelson Cruz (TEX)	Prince Fielder (MIL)
Carlos Peña (TB)	Adrián González (SD)
Joe Mauer (MIN)	Ryan Howard (PHI)
Brandon Inge (DET)	Albert Pujols (STL)

== Rules ==
Each participant is thrown pitches by a pitcher of his choice. The hitter has the option of not swinging at a pitch. If he swings at a pitch and misses or hits the pitch anywhere but in home run territory, it is considered an out. Each player hits until he receives 10 outs in each round.

In the first two rounds, home run totals carried over for those rounds. Should there be a tie after either of the first two rounds, a "Swing-Off" takes place. In a Swing-Off, each tied player gets 5 swings to get as many home runs as possible. Home runs hit during a first round Swing-Off does not count towards the player's total going into the second round. All eight players participated in the first round; the four highest totals from round one will move to the semi-finals. The top two totals will face off in the finals, with the scores deleted from the first two rounds.

== Charitable Initiatives ==
=== Gold Ball ===
When a player reaches nine outs in each round, the "Gold Ball" was brought into play. For each Gold Ball hit for a home run, State Farm agreed to donate US $17,000 (one dollar for each of their agents) for each home run hit to the Boys and Girls Clubs of America. This marks the fifth Home Run Derby for the Gold Ball rule. Each non-Gold Ball homer was worth $5,000. Overall, $527,000 was raised.

=== Stand Up 2 Cancer ===
MasterCard International would have donated $1 million to the Stand Up to Cancer initiative if a player had hit a home run off one of three designated banners in the stadium, which nobody did. Previously, sponsors like MasterCard and Chevrolet had given away 500 airline tickets and automobiles had home run balls hit designated banners. The banners remained in place for the All-Star Game.

== Results ==
Busch Stadium, St. Louis—N.L. 51, A.L. 31
Player	Team	Round 1	Round 2	Subtotal	Finals	Total
Prince Fielder	Brewers	11	6	17	6	23
Nelson Cruz	Rangers	11	5	16	5	21
Ryan Howard	Phillies	7	8	15	–	15
Albert Pujols	Cardinals	5 (2)	6	11	–	11
Carlos Peña	Rays	5 (1)	–	5	–	5
Joe Mauer	Twins	5 (0)	–	5	–	5
Adrián González	Padres	2	–	2	–	2
Brandon Inge	Tigers	0	–	0	–	0

italics – Hall of Famer

Notes:
^a Advanced after winning swing off. Pujols 2, Peña 1, Mauer 0.
