= Prince Fielder =

American baseball player (born 1984)

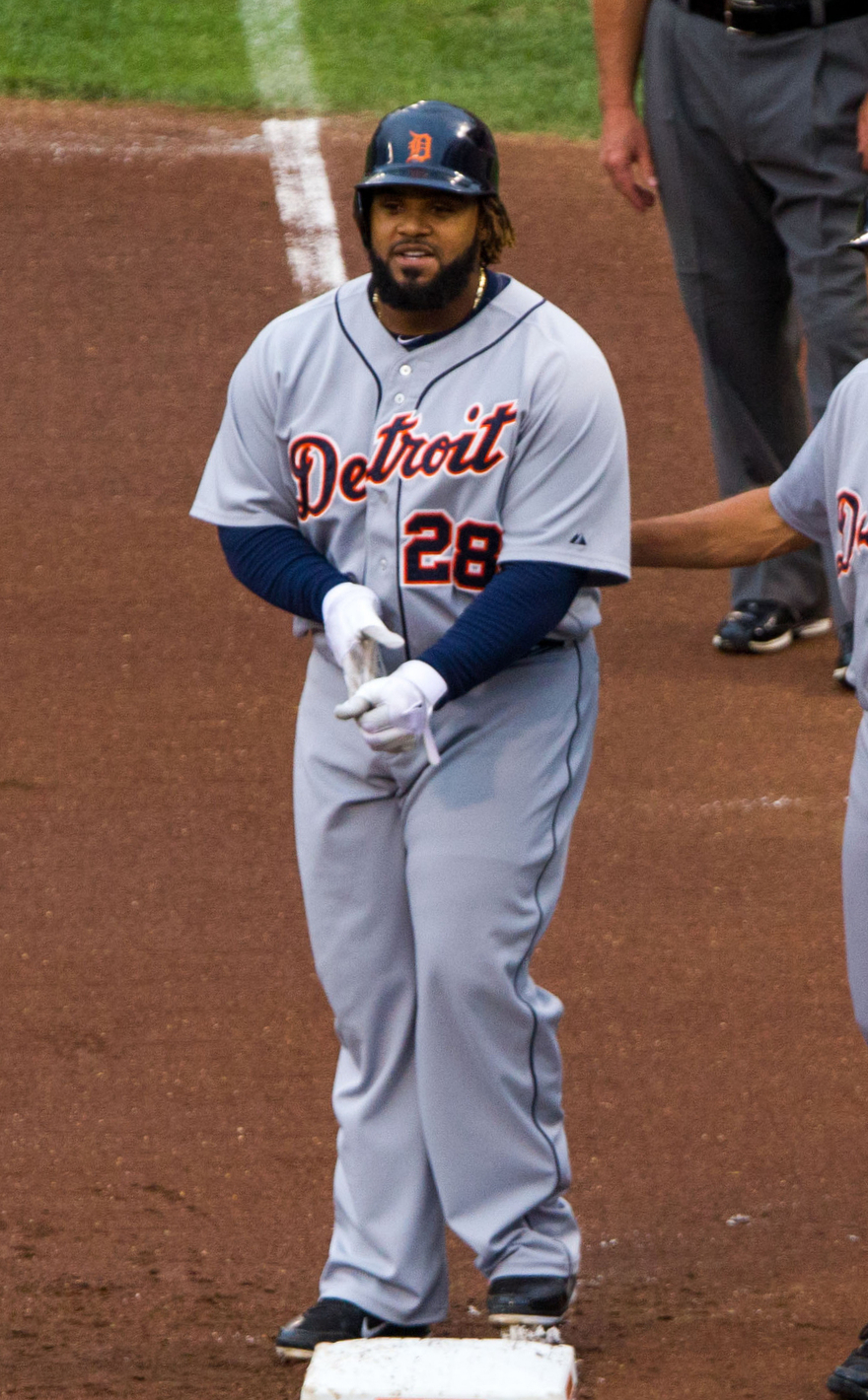
- Fielder with the Detroit Tigers in 2012
- First baseman
- Born: May 9, 1984 (age 42); Ontario, California, U.S.
- Batted: Left Threw: Right

MLB debut
- June 13, 2005, for the Milwaukee Brewers

Last MLB appearance
- July 18, 2016, for the Texas Rangers

MLB statistics
- Batting average: .283
- Home runs: 319
- Runs batted in: 1,028
- Stats at Baseball Reference

Teams
- Milwaukee Brewers (2005–2011); Detroit Tigers (2012–2013); Texas Rangers (2014–2016)

Career highlights and awards
- 6× All-Star (2007, 2009, 2011–2013, 2015); 3× Silver Slugger Award (2007, 2011, 2012); NL Hank Aaron Award (2007); AL Comeback Player of the Year (2015); NL home run leader (2007); MLB RBI leader (2009); Milwaukee Brewers Wall of Honor; American Family Field Walk of Fame

Prince Semien Fielder (born May 9, 1984) is an American former professional baseball first baseman and designated hitter, who played in Major League Baseball (MLB) for the Milwaukee Brewers, Detroit Tigers, and Texas Rangers. He was selected in the first round of the 2002 Major League Baseball draft by the Brewers out of Eau Gallie High School in Melbourne, Florida, and spent the first seven years of his MLB career with the Brewers before signing with the Tigers, in January 2012. In November 2013, Fielder was traded to the Rangers, where he played the remainder of his career.

Fielder is a six-time All-Star. He holds the Brewers' team record for home runs (HR) and runs batted in (RBI) in a season and is the youngest player in National League (NL) history to hit 50 home runs in a season. He became the first Brewer to win the Home Run Derby, defeating Nelson Cruz in the final round of the 2009 derby. Fielder also won the 2012 derby, joining Ken Griffey Jr. (and later Yoenis Céspedes and Pete Alonso) as the only players to win more than one derby and becoming the first player to win the Derby as both an American League (AL) and NL All-Star.

On August 10, 2016, Fielder announced that he would be unable to continue his playing career after undergoing a second neck surgery in three years. He was released by the Rangers on October 4, 2017. He ended his career with 319 home runs, the same number as his father, Cecil Fielder. Fielder also had 1,028 RBIs during his time in the majors, improving on his father’s 1,008 career RBIs. Prince and Cecil Fielder are also the only father-son duo to each hit 50 MLB home runs in a season, and were the only father-son duo to hit 40 MLB home runs in a season until 2021, when Vladimir Guerrero Jr. joined his own father in achieving the feat.

== Early life ==
Fielder was initially right-handed, but at a very young age was converted to being a left-handed hitter by his father, baseball player Cecil Fielder. Fielder was a fixture around his father's teams' clubhouses growing up. He appeared with his father on MTV Rock N' Jock Softball. When his father played for Detroit, Prince would sometimes come along for batting practice. Fielder hit a home run off Tigers third base coach Terry Francona into the upper deck of Tiger Stadium as a 12-year-old in 1996.

Fielder attended Saint Edward's School in Vero Beach, Florida, for two years, where he played junior varsity baseball. Fielder spent his first three years of high school playing at Florida Air Academy in Melbourne, Florida. He then transferred to Eau Gallie High School, located in the Eau Gallie neighborhood of Melbourne, to play baseball there his senior year (2002). He hit .524 with 13 doubles, 10 home runs, 41 runs batted in (RBIs), and 47 runs in his senior year. He was named by Florida Today as the All-Space Coast Player of the Year in 2002. Fielder committed to play college baseball for Arizona State.

== Professional career ==
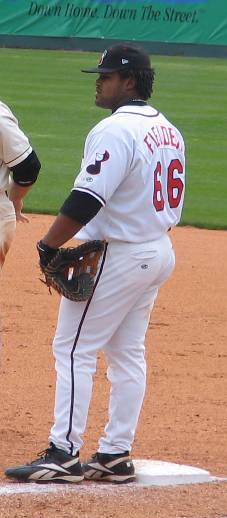
Fielder playing for the Nashville Sounds in 2005

=== Draft and minor leagues ===
The Milwaukee Brewers drafted Fielder in the first round, with the seventh overall selection, of the 2002 Major League Baseball draft. He signed with the Brewers and began his professional career in minor league baseball with the Ogden Raptors of the Rookie-level Pioneer League. In his first professional game, he hit a grand slam in the bottom of the 9th inning to tie it up. Ogden would go on to win in the 10th inning. He was promoted to the Beloit Snappers of the Single–A Midwest League that season. Fielder spent the 2003 season with Beloit and was promoted to the Huntsville Stars of the Double–A Southern League for the 2004 season.

Fielder began the 2005 season with the Nashville Sounds of the Triple–A Pacific Coast League.

=== Milwaukee Brewers (2005–2011) ===
==== 2005 ====
Fielder earned his first call-up to Major League Baseball on June 13, 2005. He served as the designated hitter for the Brewers during interleague play. On June 15, 2005, he collected his first major league hit, a double, off Hideo Nomo, and drove in his first big league run with his second hit of the night at Tampa Bay. Prince also hit his first home run on June 25, 2005.

However, with Lyle Overbay serving as the Brewers' regular first baseman, Fielder was sent back down to the Sounds shortly after the end of interleague play. Fielder was again called up to the Majors on August 17, 2005, and went on to finish the season with the Brewers, where he was used as a pinch-hitter. He was the sixth-youngest player in the league.

==== 2006 ====
After the Brewers traded Overbay to the Toronto Blue Jays, Fielder became the Brewers' starting first baseman in 2006. He was an early favorite for National League Rookie of the Year.

Fielder did not get off to a great start in the 2006 regular season, going 0–9 with seven strikeouts. In his 12th at-bat, Fielder delivered a game-winning hit that drove home Geoff Jenkins for the winning run in the bottom of the 8th inning against the Pittsburgh Pirates. Fielder was named the National League's Rookie of the Month for April. With his 18th home run of the year, Fielder broke the Brewers' rookie home run record previously held by Danny Walton and Greg Vaughn.

Fielder led all major league rookies with 28 homers in the 2006 season. On defense, he had the lowest zone rating among NL first basemen, .804.

==== 2007 ====
Fielder had a strong first half in 2007, earning a start at first base in the 2007 All-Star game over the previous two MVP winners, Ryan Howard (2006) and Albert Pujols (2005).

On August 13, 2007, Fielder was featured on a magazine cover for the first time when he was featured on the August 13, 2007, issue of ESPN The Magazine.

On September 15, 2007, Fielder broke the Brewers franchise record for home runs in a season, hitting his 46th in a game against the Cincinnati Reds. The record was previously jointly held by Richie Sexson (twice) and Gorman Thomas.

On September 25, Fielder became the youngest player ever to reach 50 home runs in a season, joining his estranged father in the exclusive club. Fielder stated that he hoped to surpass his father's total of 51 home runs in a season (1990) as a way of exorcising the demons that came with being the son of a prominent major-leaguer. "A lot of people said that's the only reason I got drafted... I don't mind people comparing me to him but I'm a completely different player. One day I want people to mention my name and not have to mention his," Fielder said. Earlier in the season, Cecil Fielder had told a magazine that it was his famous name that led to his son being such a highly touted prospect. The younger Fielder also saw his contention in the 2007 NL MVP race as a way of proving his father wrong, but got little else from the rift but motivation saying, "You've got to look at who's saying it. Let's be honest. He's not really the brightest guy."

Fielder ranked first in the National League in home runs (50) in his MVP-caliber 2007 season (and was, until the 2017 MLB season, the last player in the National League to hit 50 or more home runs in a single season, when Giancarlo Stanton hit 59 home runs), was second in slugging percentage to teammate Ryan Braun (.618), second in at-bats per home run (11.5) and OPS (1.013), third in RBIs (119) and extra-base hits (87), fourth in total bases (354) and hit by pitch (14), fifth in intentional walks (21) and sacrifice flies (8), seventh in runs (109) and times on base (269), and ninth in walks (90).

In 2007, he led all major league first basemen in errors, with 14, and was last among eligible major league first basemen in range factor (8.49).

Fielder earned the Milwaukee Brewers Team MVP award, the Player's Choice NL Outstanding Player award, 2007 Silver Slugger award, and was voted the National League's Hank Aaron Award winner.

==== 2008 ====
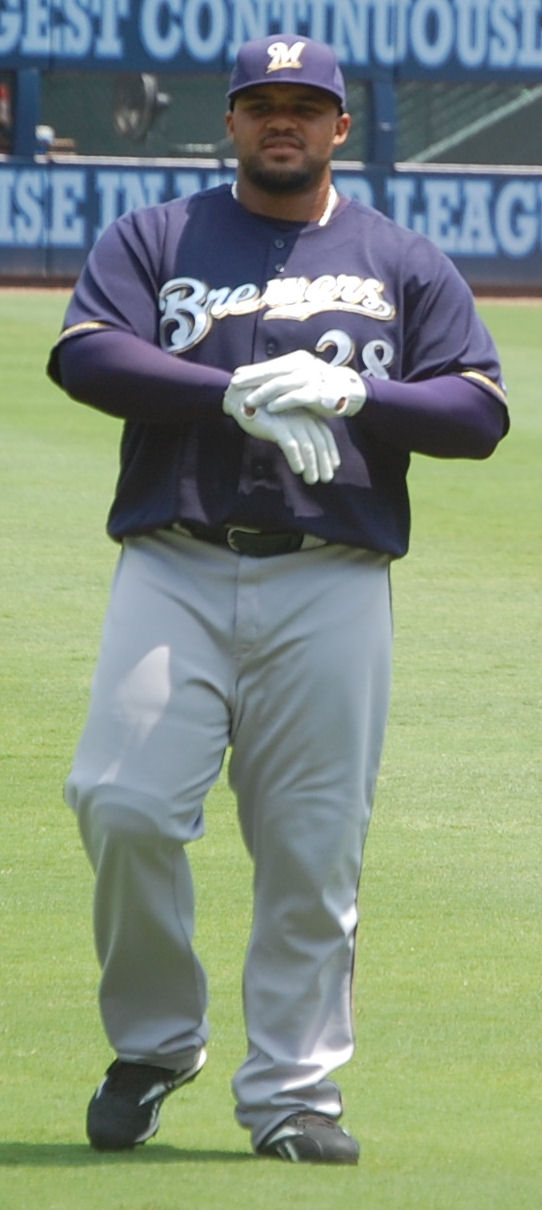
Fielder with the Milwaukee Brewers in 2008

Unable to come up with an agreement for a long-term contract with the Brewers, Fielder and his agent, Scott Boras, signed a one-year, $670,000 deal with the Brewers. Fielder was quoted saying, "I'm not happy about it at all", showing his disappointment in not being able to reach an agreement with the club.

On June 19, while playing against the Toronto Blue Jays, Fielder hit the second inside-the-park home run of his career.

On August 4, Fielder and teammate Manny Parra got into a scuffle in the dugout during a game against the Cincinnati Reds in which Parra was the starting pitcher. They were having a brief conversation, which led to Parra throwing his jacket down and Fielder shoving him. Fielder had to be restrained by teammates Ray Durham, Dave Bush, J. J. Hardy, Ryan Braun, and pitching coach Mike Maddux. ESPN reported that night that the dispute was over Parra heading back to the clubhouse after being pulled from the game instead of staying in the dugout to watch the Brewers bat in the next inning. Baseball Tonight also reported that the exchange was started when Parra told Fielder to "get off his fat ass and play defense." Manager Ned Yost said reporters asking questions about the incident was as rude as "going over to the neighbors' house after they've been fighting and asking about it."

On September 23, Fielder hit his second walk-off home run against the Pittsburgh Pirates, helping the Brewers keep pace with the New York Mets in the NL Wild Card race.

Fielder was named the National League Player of the Week for the week of September 15–21 after he batted .462, with 27 total bases, six doubles, 11 RBIs, .533 on-base percentage, and a 1.038 slugging percentage.

Fielder ended the 2008 regular season with a .276 batting average, 34 home runs, 102 RBIs, 86 runs and 84 walks. The Brewers finished 90–72, earning the NL Wild Card on the final day of the regular season, their first postseason berth as a National League club and their first since losing to the St. Louis Cardinals in the 1982 World Series. They faced the Philadelphia Phillies and were eliminated in four. Fielder hit the Brewers' only home run of the series, in Game 4.

==== 2009 ====
After the 2008 season, Fielder was seeking an $8 million salary in 2009, while the Brewers filed for $6 million. On January 23, the Brewers and Fielder avoided arbitration and finalized a two-year $18 million contract.

On June 15, 2009, Fielder hit his first career grand slam at Progressive Field against Rafael Perez of the Cleveland Indians .

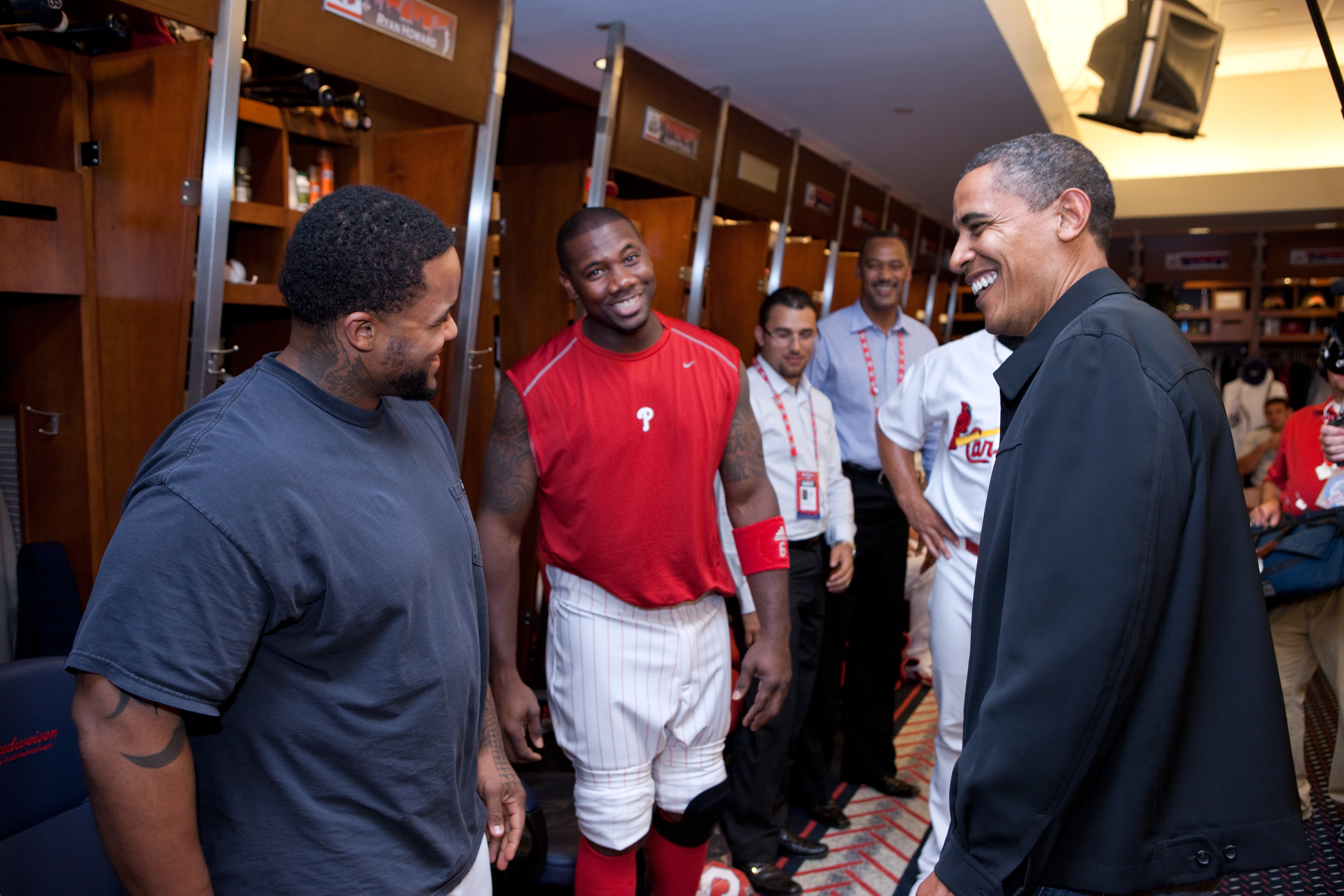
Fielder, Ryan Howard, and President Barack Obama before the start of the All-Star Game, July 14, 2009

Fielder was one of four NL first basemen who made the 2009 Major League Baseball All-Star Game, joining starter Albert Pujols and fellow reservists Adrián González and Ryan Howard. Fielder won the 2009 Major League Baseball Home Run Derby in St Louis. Fielder began the Derby with a Rickie Weeks bat, but quickly switched to one of Ryan Braun's because it was longer and gave him more plate coverage. He made the finals with 17 home runs after the first two rounds, eliminating local favorites Albert Pujols and Ryan Howard. He then beat former Brewers teammate Nelson Cruz with six homers in the final round. His 23 long balls tied for the sixth-most in the Derby's history. He also hit the longest home run of the Derby at 503 feet (153 m).

On August 4, Fielder was involved in an incident with Los Angeles Dodgers relief pitcher Guillermo Mota. With two outs in the ninth inning, Mota hit Fielder with a pitch on the leg, apparently in retaliation for Mota's teammate Manny Ramirez being hit in the hand by Brewers pitcher Chris Smith. Mota was ejected. After the 17–4 Dodgers victory, Fielder went to the Dodgers clubhouse in an effort to confront Mota. The Dodgers security guards stopped Fielder from entering, though the incident was captured by a television crew. Both Mota and Fielder were fined by Major League Baseball for their roles in the incident.

Fielder had a good September. While playing the San Francisco Giants on September 6, Fielder hit his third career walk-off home run in the 12th inning. The Brewers' subsequent home plate celebration sparked a minor controversy due to its unusual style. Then, on September 19, Fielder set the Brewers' single-season record for RBIs at 127, beating Cecil Cooper's 1983 record of 126. He set this record during a game against the Houston Astros — the team Cooper was managing at the time. The record-breaking RBI was a sacrifice fly, scoring Mike Cameron. He finished the season with 141 RBIs, which surpassed his father's career high of 133 in 1991.

Fielder finished tied for first in the National League in RBIs with Ryan Howard, and second in home runs with 46. He is one of three players in Brewers franchise history to have 100 or more RBIs in three consecutive seasons, along with Richie Sexson (2001–03) and Ryan Braun (2008–10).

==== 2011 ====
On January 18, Fielder and the Brewers agreed on a one-year, $15.5 million contract. Fielder was named MVP of the 82nd All Star Game, in which he hit a 3-run home run.

Along with Fielder, Braun also hit 30 home runs on the season, marking the 4th time the duo each hit at least 30 home runs in a season. Only 6 other duos have done this in major league history.

Fielder became one of three Brewers who have had four 100-RBI seasons, along with Cecil Cooper and Braun.

On September 27 in a game against the Pittsburgh Pirates, Fielder went 3-for-3 with three home runs and a walk, and 5 RBIs. It was his first career three-home run game.

In 2011, Fielder batted .299, led the National League in intentional walks (32, a Brewers record), was second in the league in home runs (38), and was third in slugging percentage (.566). On defense, he led the majors in errors committed by a first baseman (15) and had the lowest fielding percentage of all first basemen (.990). Through 2011, he had the second-highest career slugging percentage (.540) and OPS (.929) of any player in Brewers history, behind Braun, and was second in career home runs (230) to Robin Yount.

Fielder came in third in the voting for the 2011 National League Most Valuable Player Award, behind winner and teammate Ryan Braun and Matt Kemp.

=== Detroit Tigers (2012–2013) ===
==== 2012 ====
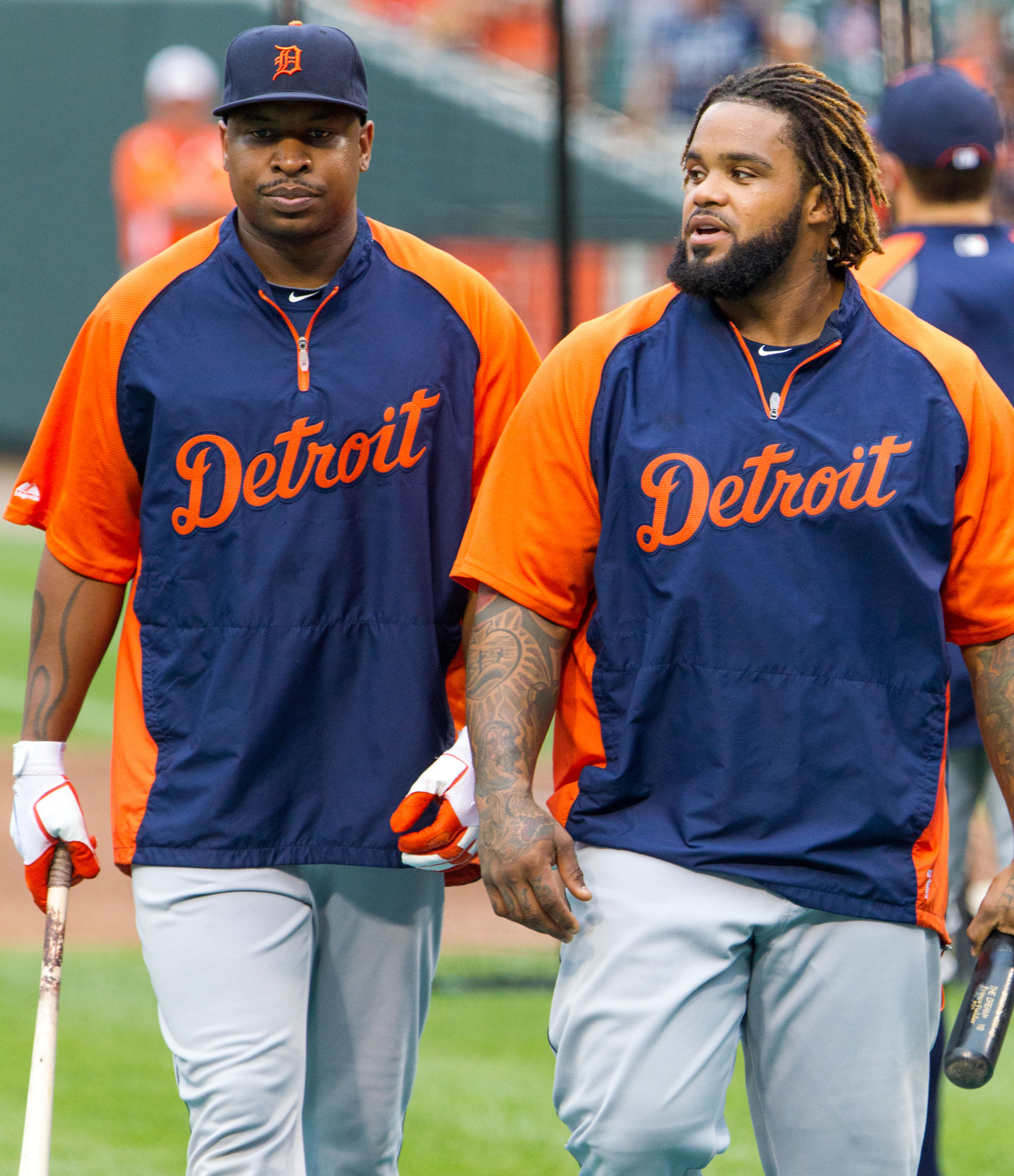
Prince Fielder (right) and teammate Delmon Young (left) with the Tigers on July 13, 2012

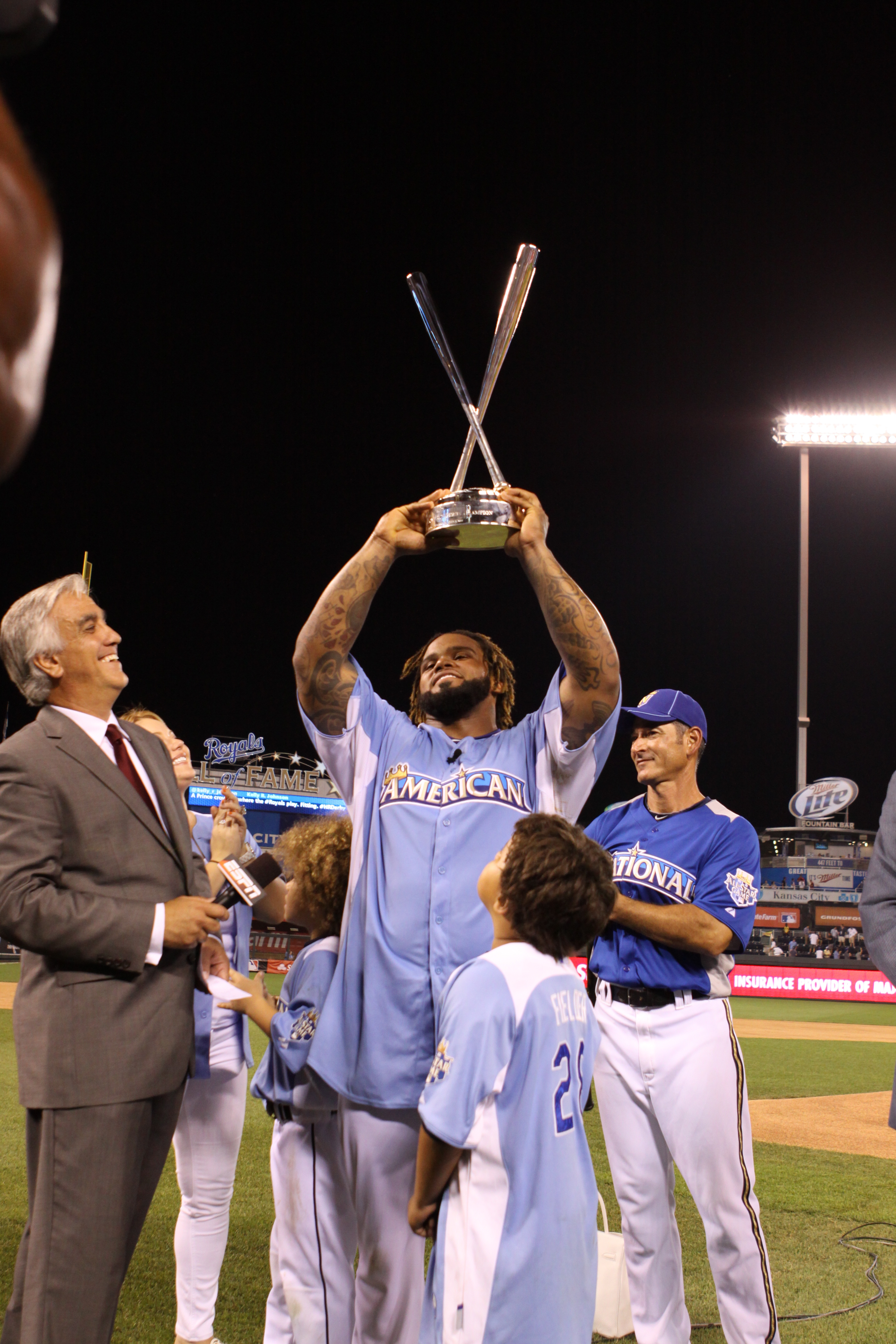
Fielder after winning his second Home Run Derby title in 2012

Following the 2011 World Series, Fielder became a free agent. On January 26, 2012, Fielder agreed to a nine-year, $214 million contract with the Detroit Tigers to play first base and bat clean-up in the Tigers batting order. It was the largest contract in the history of the Tigers, surpassing Miguel Cabrera's contract of $185.3 million over eight years. The Tigers acquired Fielder to replace the bat of an injured Víctor Martínez, the everyday designated hitter in 2011. The acquisition of Fielder, who had only played first base in his career, required 2008–2011 first baseman Miguel Cabrera to move to third, which Cabrera was notably happy to do.

On April 5, 2012, Fielder made his debut with the Tigers and singled in his first at bat.

Fielder hit his first two home runs as a Tiger on April 7, 2012, in a 10–0 victory over the Boston Red Sox. In his first season in the American League, he was voted to the 2012 All-Star team as a starter. It is his fourth All-Star appearance overall. Fielder was also selected by American League captain, Robinson Canó, to participate in the 2012 Home Run Derby.

On July 9, 2012, Fielder became the 2012 Home Run Derby champion, hitting 12 home runs in the third and final round over José Bautista of the Toronto Blue Jays. This is Fielder's second win in the derby, his first coming in 2009. Fielder became the first participant to win for both the National and American League, and joined Ken Griffey Jr. as the only two players to win multiple Derbies.

Fielder finished the 2012 regular season with a career-best .313 batting average. He hit 30 home runs, giving him six straight seasons with at least 30 long balls, and drove in 108 runs for his fifth career 100-plus RBI season. He also had an on-base percentage of .412, his fourth straight season with an on-base percentage above .400. He played in all 162 games for Detroit, his third such season in his career, and he led the American League in being hit by pitches (17). Some in the sports media have given Fielder at least partial credit for teammate Cabrera winning the Triple Crown of batting in 2012. With Fielder hitting behind him in the Tiger order, Cabrera's walks declined from 108 the previous season to just 66, giving him more opportunities to hit home runs and drive in runs. Cabrera would later confirm in a June 2013 Sports Illustrated article: "You can see a difference. They pitch to me more...I see a lot of good pitches."

The 2012 World Series was Fielder's first career trip to the World Series. He compiled only a .071 batting average (1-for-14) during the World Series as the Tigers were swept in four games at the hands of the San Francisco Giants. In Game 2 of the series, Fielder was hit on the shoulder by a pitch from Giants starting pitcher Madison Bumgarner. After Delmon Young hit a double down the left-field line, Prince attempted to score. However, a relay throw from Gregor Blanco to Marco Scutaro to Buster Posey tagged Fielder out as he was sliding home. This became the first-ever 7-4-2 putout in a World Series.

==== 2013 ====
Fielder was named AL Player of the Week for April 8–14. He hit .632 during the week (12-for-19) with 11 RBIs and 22 total bases. He finished the month of April with a .301 batting average, 7 home runs, and 27 RBIs. On July 1, Fielder was voted in as a reserve infielder in the AL player balloting for the 2013 Major League All-Star Game. It was his fifth career All-Star selection. During the All-Star Game, he hit a lead-off triple in the ninth inning off of Jason Grilli. He did not score but the American League still won the game 3–0.

Fielder hit .279 during the 2013 regular season, and his 25 home runs was the lowest total in any of his eight full major league seasons until he hit only 23 in 2015. He did, however, drive in 106 runs, marking the sixth time he topped 100 in his career. Fielder also played all 162 games for the third straight season, and played in his 500th consecutive game on September 24. This followed a 327-game streak that was broken in September 2010, when he played for the Brewers. (He missed one game due to severe flu symptoms.) By the end of the 2013 season, he had played in 831 of his last 832 regular-season games.

Fielder batted .278 in the ALDS against Oakland, registering 5 hits and no RBIs. In the 2013 ALCS he declined further, registering a .182 average with only 4 hits and no RBIs.

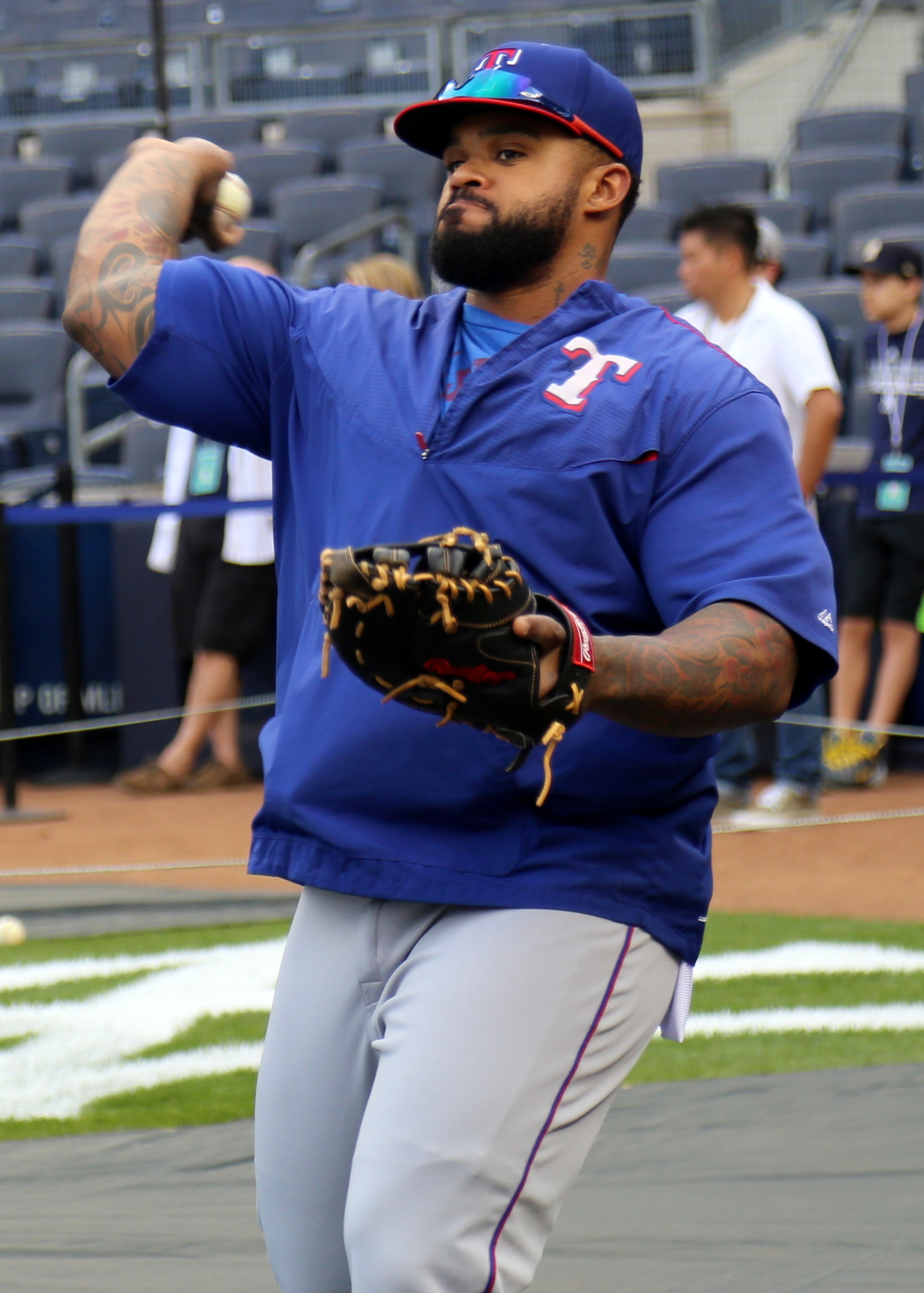
Prince Fielder with the Rangers on May 24, 2015

=== Texas Rangers (2014–2017) ===
==== 2014 ====
On November 20, 2013, Fielder was traded to the Texas Rangers along with $30 million for second baseman Ian Kinsler. In June 2014 Fielder underwent season ending neck surgery. At the time of his mid-season departure, he was batting .247 with 3 home runs and 16 RBI in 42 games. Fielder's then league-leading streak of 547 consecutive games started was ended.

==== 2015 ====
Nearly halfway through the season Fielder led the AL in batting average and was selected as a reserve designated hitter for the MLB All Star Game in Cincinnati. It was Fielder's sixth appearance in the All-Star Game and his fourth selection in five seasons. He finished the 2015 season with a .305 batting average, 23 home runs, and 98 RBIs, and was named the American League Comeback Player of the Year.

==== 2016 ====
On April 29, 2016, in a game against the Los Angeles Angels in the bottom of the 6th inning, Fielder hit a sharp single through the shift to score Rougned Odor, making him and his father Cecil Fielder the 2nd father-son combo to both record 1,000 RBIs. On July 20, it was revealed that Fielder was diagnosed with C4-C5 herniations in his neck, putting his career in jeopardy. In a press conference on August 10, Fielder announced that he would not be able to continue playing professional baseball due to his injuries, though he did not formally retire, allowing him to continue to collect the rest of his contract. In 89 games of 2016, Fielder finished his injury-shortened season with a .212 batting average, 16 doubles, 8 home runs, and 44 RBIs.

==== 2017 ====
On October 5, 2017, after negotiating a settlement with the insurance company covering his contract, the Rangers released Fielder to free up his spot on the 40-Man roster.

=== Career statistics ===
In 1611 games over 12 seasons, Fielder posted a .283 batting average (1645-for-5821) with 862 runs, 321 doubles, 10 triples, 319 home runs, 1028 RBIs, 18 stolen bases, 847 walks, .382 on-base percentage and .506 slugging percentage. Defensively, he recorded a .992 fielding percentage playing every inning at first base. In 44 postseason games, he batted only .189 (31-for-164) with 13 runs, 5 doubles, 5 home runs, 12 RBIs, and 15 walks.

Fielder was included on the ballot for the National Baseball Hall of Fame class of 2022 when it was announced on November 22, 2021, but after ballots were counted, he became ineligible for future balloting, due to receiving less than 5% of the total.

== Post-playing career ==
Fielder served as the hitting coach for the American League team in the 2024 All-Star Futures Game.

== Personal life ==
Fielder was named after his grandfather. He married his wife Chanel in 2005 during the Triple-A All-Star break while playing for the Nashville Sounds. They have two sons. One of his sons, Jadyn Fielder, was signed by the Brewers in 2024 after going undrafted in the MLB draft. Fielder filed for divorce in May 2013, but by March 2014, he and his wife had reconciled. They reside in Windermere, Florida.

Fielder has a tattoo on the left side of his neck that reads, "왕자", Korean for "Prince".

== See also ==
- List of Major League Baseball career home run leaders
- List of Major League Baseball career runs batted in leaders

Awards and achievements
Preceded by José Reyes	National League Player of the Month; May 2007	Succeeded by Alfonso Soriano
Preceded by Ryan Howard	Players Choice NL Outstanding Player; 2007	Succeeded by Albert Pujols
