= Outfield =

Playing field section in baseball and cricket

The outfield, in cricket, baseball and softball is the area of the field of play further from the batsman or batter than the infield. In association football (soccer), the outfield players are positioned outside the goal area.

== In bat and ball games ==
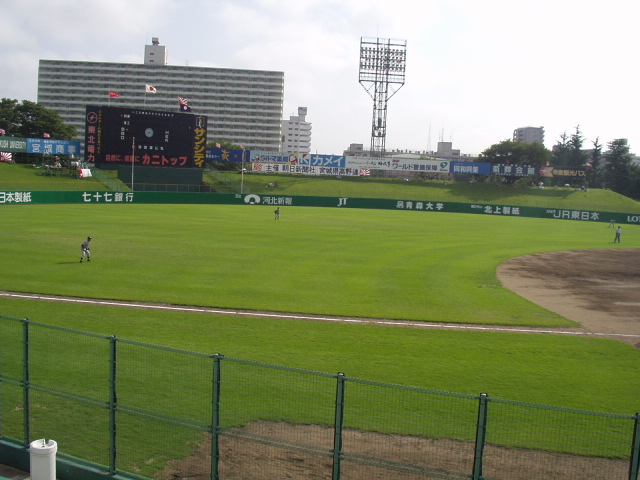
The outfield during a baseball game at Rakuten Seimei Park Miyagi

In baseball, softball and cricket, fielders in the outfield have more ground to cover than infielders, but also more time before the ball reaches them. Catches are most likely to arise from shots that have been 'skied' (in cricket) or 'popped ' (in baseball and softball). If a catch is not possible (for example, the ball has bounced, or is rolling or skidding across the turf) the fielder will attempt to head off, pick up and throw in the ball as quickly as possible to reduce the distance the runners can run and hopefully to effect a run out (cricket) or tag out (baseball and softball).

In cricket, where the ball is far more likely to stay low against the ground than in baseball or softball, the condition of the turf has a major effect on the speed at which the ball travels through the outfield. On a slow outfield the ball decelerates significantly, making fielding easier and batting harder — in particular boundaries are far harder to hit. This usually occurs if the playing surface is uneven or if it is damp from rain or dew. However, on a fast outfield the ball does not decelerate significantly even when rolling along the turf, often racing past the fielders and over the boundary rope. In these circumstances, batsmen find it easier to score runs quickly. Commentators often refer to the ball accelerating to the boundary on fast outfields, but this only physically occurs on grounds with a slope and on which the ball is moving downhill.

In baseball and softball, a slow, damp outfield is usually considered an advantage for the hitter, in as much as a batted ball will not travel as quickly to an outfielder in the traditional deep position for fly balls, and thus may permit additional advance by batters and other runners on the basepaths. In addition, a wet, slick ball can not be thrown with the accuracy of a dry one, also permitting the opportunity for additional advance on the bases. Moreover, a wet field generally slows the footspeed of the defense, so fielders will be able to reach fewer flies and line drives in the air before they go through to the fences.

== In association football ==
In association football, each team fields eleven players per match. One player is the goalkeeper, who stays mostly near the goal, while the other ten are known as "outfield" players. The Laws of the Game do not specify any player positions other than goalkeeper, but a number of specialised roles have evolved. Broadly, these include three main categories: strikers, or forwards, whose main task is to score goals; defenders, who specialise in preventing their opponents from scoring; and midfielders, who dispossess the opposition and keep possession of the ball to pass it to the forwards on their team. Players in these positions are referred to as outfield players, to distinguish them from the goalkeeper.

== See also ==
- Infield
- Fielding (cricket)
- Baseball field
- Total Football
- Outfielder, for more information about the baseball fielding positions in the outfield.
- Wall climb, baseball players using the wall as an asset to fielding potential home runs
