= Wall climb =

Baseball fielding play

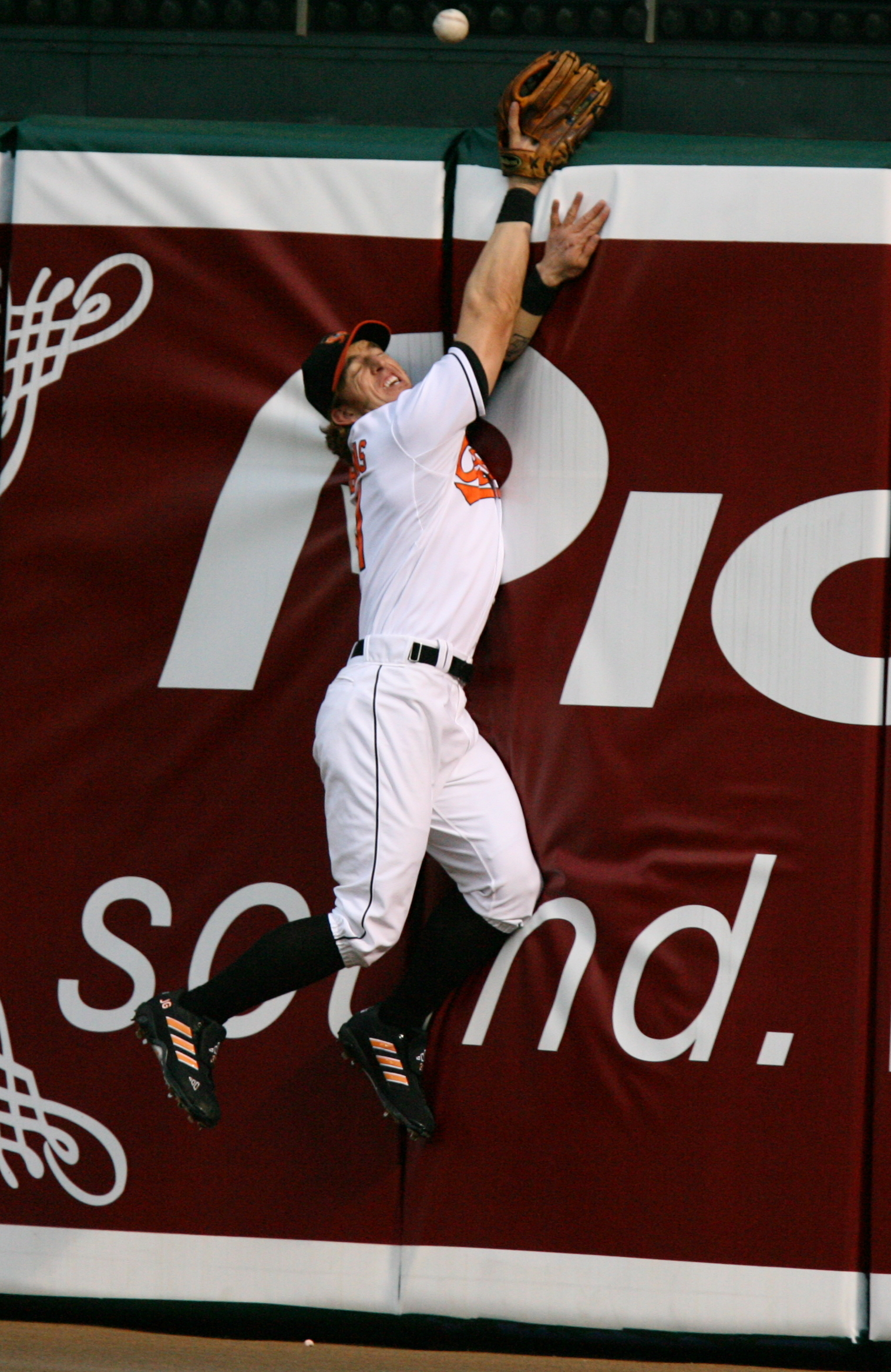
Jay Gibbons leaps and climbs the outfield wall in 2007, as he tries to catch a high fly ball.

A wall climb is a play in baseball where a fielder makes an out by catching a fly ball or pop up while climbing a wall.

The play is generally made by outfielders robbing hitters of hits that otherwise would have been home runs, or at the very least a double. A wall climb can also be made by climbing the wall in foul territory to make an out. Under Major League Baseball (MLB) rules, the catch is ruled an out when the fielder making the out has at least one foot over legal playing territory during the catch and no feet touching the ground of an out of play area, regardless of whether his body ultimately lands in the field of play or out of play.

One MLB player with a reputation for wall climbing was outfielder Torii Hunter, who won nine Gold Gloves in his 19-year major league career. One notable wall climb by Hunter occurred in the first inning of the 2002 Major League Baseball All-Star Game, when he robbed Barry Bonds of a home run in right-center field.

The wall climb move is also simulated in baseball video games such as the MLB 2K series.

== See also ==
- Steve Bartman incident
