= Paul Nauert =

American baseball umpire (born 1963)

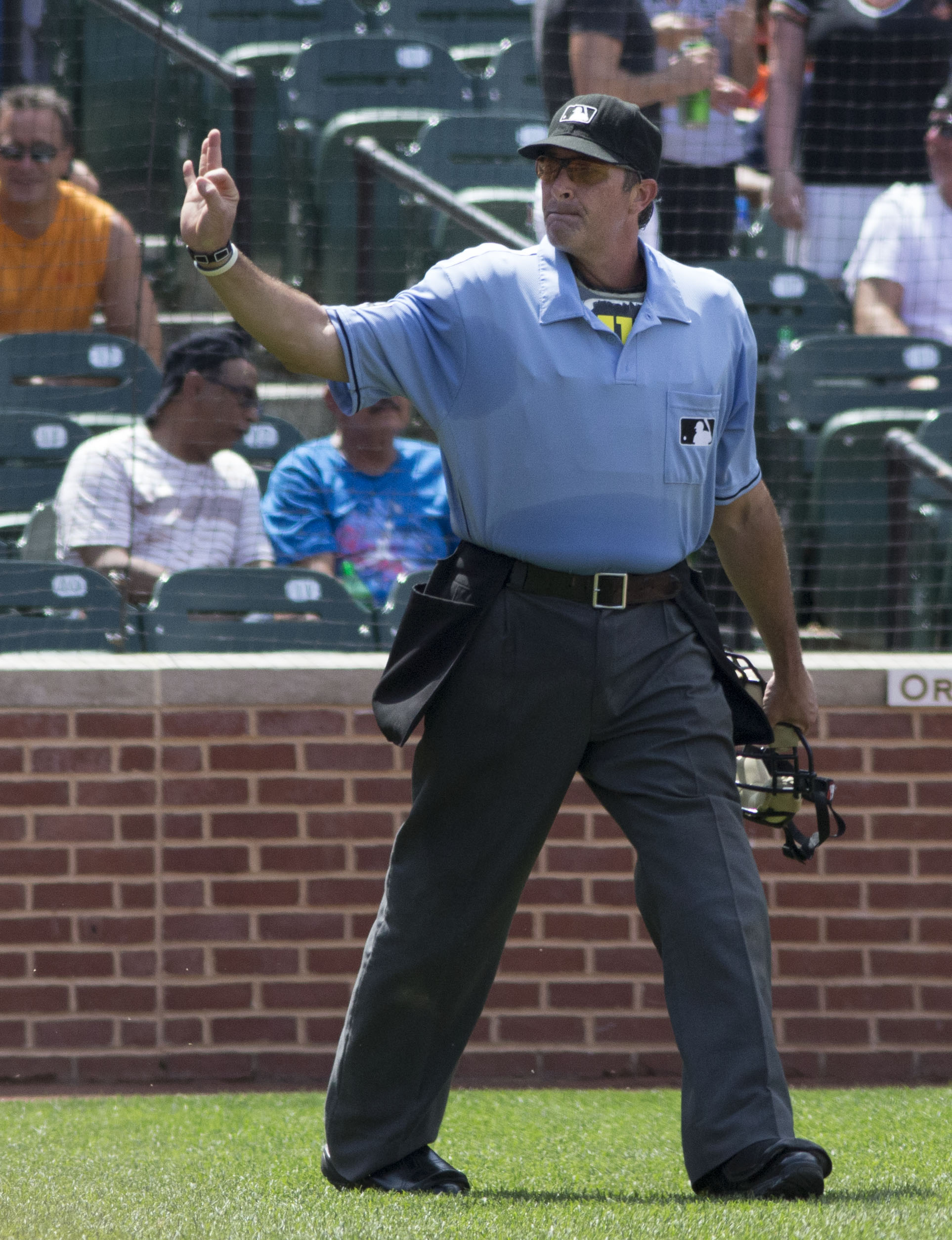
- Nauert in 2013
- Born: July 7, 1963 (age 62); Louisville, Kentucky, U.S.

MLB debut
- May 19, 1995

Last appearance
- September 30, 2020

Career highlights and awards
- Special Assignments: All-Star Game (2009); Wild Card Game (2020); Division Series (2004, 2008, 2010, 2013, 2014, 2017); League Championship Series (2016); World Series (2017)

Paul Edward Nauert (NART) (born July 7, 1963) is an American retired professional baseball umpire. He worked for the National League from 1995 to 1999 and for Major League Baseball from 2002 until his retirement in 2022. Nauert worked the 2017 World Series.

Nauert graduated from the Harry Wendelstedt Umpires School in 1988, finishing at the top of his class. He later taught at the school. He also attended Jefferson Community College.

Nauert worked in minor leagues in the Appalachian League (1988), Midwest League (1989–1990), Florida Instructional League (1988–1990), Southern League (1991–1992), and International League (1993–1998). He was the base umpire during the 27-inning, eight-hour-and-15-minute, Bluefield at Burlington game of June 24, 1988, that ended at 3:27 am the next morning.

Nauert umpired his first National League game on May 19, 1995. His father attended the game, sitting next to an empty seat reserved for Nauert's deceased mother. Nauert was one of 22 umpires whose resignations were accepted in 1999 as part of a failed union negotiating strategy. He later said the incident was personally devastating and almost led to him getting divorced. On being rehired in 2002, he became part of the Major League Baseball umpire staff.

Nauert has worked the 2020 American League Wild Card Series, the 2004 American League Division Series (ALDS), the 2008 National League Division Series (NLDS), the 2010 NLDS, the 2013 NLDS, the 2014 ALDS, the 2016 National League Championship Series, and the 2017 NLDS. He was a part of the crew that worked both the 2008 MLB China Series, the first MLB games ever played in China, and the 2008 Japan Opening Series. Nauert also worked the 2009 Major League Baseball All-Star Game.

Nauert was known for having a large strike zone. Boston University professor Mark T. Williams ranked Nauert the ninth worst umpire at calling balls and strikes in 2019. In 2020, Nauert's final year umpiring games, Williams' website UmpScores.com ranked Nauert the 11th worst umpire in the majors.

Nauert is married with four children. He is a member of the United Methodist Church.

== See also ==
- Lists of Major League Baseball umpires
