= Adam Dunn =

American baseball player (born 1979)

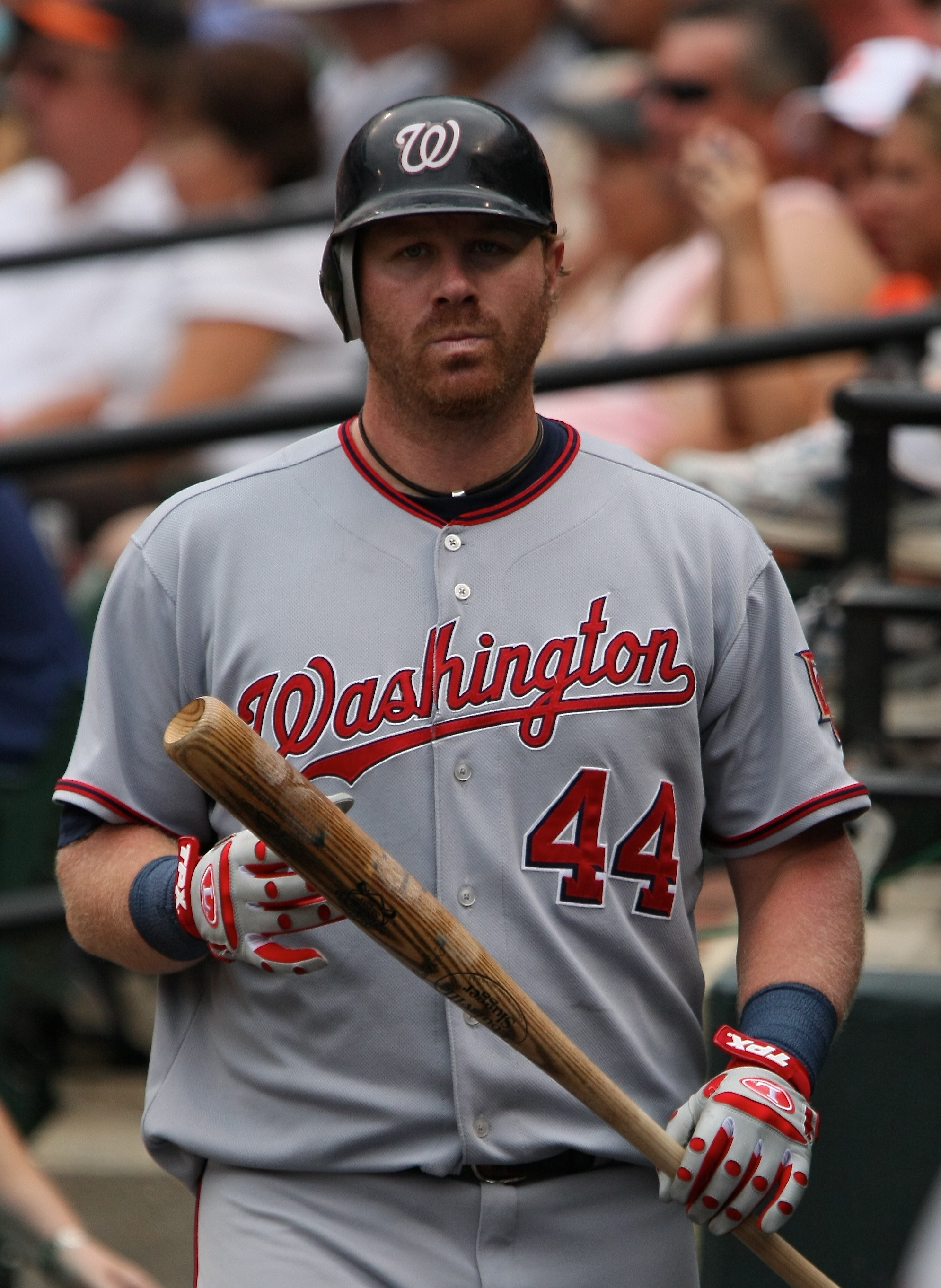
- Dunn with the Washington Nationals in 2009
- Left fielder / First baseman
- Born: November 9, 1979 (age 47); Houston, Texas, U.S.
- Batted: Left Threw: Right

MLB debut
- July 20, 2001, for the Cincinnati Reds

Last MLB appearance
- September 28, 2014, for the Oakland Athletics

MLB statistics
- Batting average: .237
- Home runs: 462
- Runs batted in: 1,168
- Stats at Baseball Reference

Teams
- Cincinnati Reds (2001–2008); Arizona Diamondbacks (2008); Washington Nationals (2009–2010); Chicago White Sox (2011–2014); Oakland Athletics (2014)

Career highlights and awards
- 2× All-Star (2002, 2012); Cincinnati Reds Hall of Fame

Adam Troy Dunn (born November 9, 1979), nicknamed "Big Donkey", is an American former professional baseball left fielder and first baseman. He played 14 seasons in Major League Baseball (MLB), primarily for the Cincinnati Reds. A two-time MLB All-Star, Dunn was known for his prodigious power and his high propensity to strike out. He hit 38 or more home runs in seven straight seasons, tied with Babe Ruth for the second-longest such streak in MLB history, and was 11th all-time in at bats per home run at the time of his retirement. In addition, in 2004, he hit the fourth-longest home run in MLB history, a 535-foot blast that landed in a different state. However, he ranks third on the all-time strikeout list, with 2,379, and is second in the American League for most strikeouts in a single season, with 222 in 2012.

Dunn's statistical profile was highly unusual for its day; he walked, struck out, or homered in nearly half his career plate appearances. Consistent with the principles of the then-emerging sabermetric movement, Dunn helped prove that a batter could significantly contribute to his team despite an unimpressive batting average. However, his defense was panned by both traditional scouting methods and modern defensive metrics. Jayson Stark called Dunn "the most unique baseball player who ever lived."

== Amateur career ==
At 6'2" and 215 pounds, Dunn was a dual-sport athlete at New Caney High School near Houston, Texas, playing both baseball and football. Although Dunn was naturally right-handed, his father Skip taught him to bat left-handed after noticing that he hit for greater power as a lefty. Growing up, he cheered for the hometown Houston Astros. After his graduation from high school, the Cincinnati Reds drafted Dunn in the second round (50th overall) of the 1998 Major League Baseball draft.

New Caney retired Dunn's football and baseball numbers in 2015. It also named its baseball field after him.

=== Football career ===
A standout football quarterback, Dunn went 24–9 in three seasons as a starter in high school and won the district championship in his senior season.

Dunn was recruited by Notre Dame, Tennessee, and Texas A&M, but committed to the Texas Longhorns football team as part of Mack Brown's first recruiting class. He struck an agreement with the Cincinnati Reds which allowed him to play for the Longhorns during the college football season.

However, Dunn never played a snap in a competitive game. He redshirted his freshman season. Although he started the season as the No. 3 quarterback, he found himself backing up Major Applewhite after Richard Walton was injured. With Applewhite entrenched in the starting role for the foreseeable future and star recruit Chris Simms arriving on campus, Dunn was asked to move to the tight end position in spring 1999. He briefly practiced as a tight end, but ultimately left the Longhorns to concentrate on baseball. He called it "probably the hardest decision I'd ever had to make."

== Minor leagues ==
Dunn played four seasons in the minor leagues. Although he did not exhibit the drastically low batting averages of his major league career - he never batted lower than .281 - he showed strong plate discipline at an early age, and never posted an on-base percentage lower than .404.

The Reds offered to promote Dunn straight from A-ball to the major leagues near the end of the 1999 season (see Cup of coffee), but Dunn declined the call-up, preferring to focus on refining his swing. The Reds also invited Dunn to major league spring training, where infielder Chris Sexton gave him the nickname "Big Donkey."

Entering the 2001 season, Dunn was ranked highly by several Minor League Baseball analysts. John Sickels ranked Dunn at No. 18 in the nation, and Baseball America ranked him at No. 33. He had a banner year. He was promoted to Double-A to start the season and dominated, hitting 12 home runs and drawing 24 walks in 39 games. He was quickly promoted to Triple-A, where he continued his hot streak, hitting 20 home runs and drawing 38 walks in 55 games. He was invited to the All-Star Futures Game, where he hit a 400-foot home run. He reached the major leagues by July.

== Professional career ==
=== Cincinnati Reds ===
The Reds called up Dunn to the majors on July 20, 2001. He promptly set a National League rookie record for the most home runs in a month by hitting 12 in August; the record stood for 16 years, until Cody Bellinger hit 13 home runs in June 2017. In his rookie season, Dunn played in 66 games, batting .262 with 19 home runs and 43 RBIs. Dunn received a single vote in 2001 National League Rookie of the Year voting, tying him for fourth place with Bud Smith.

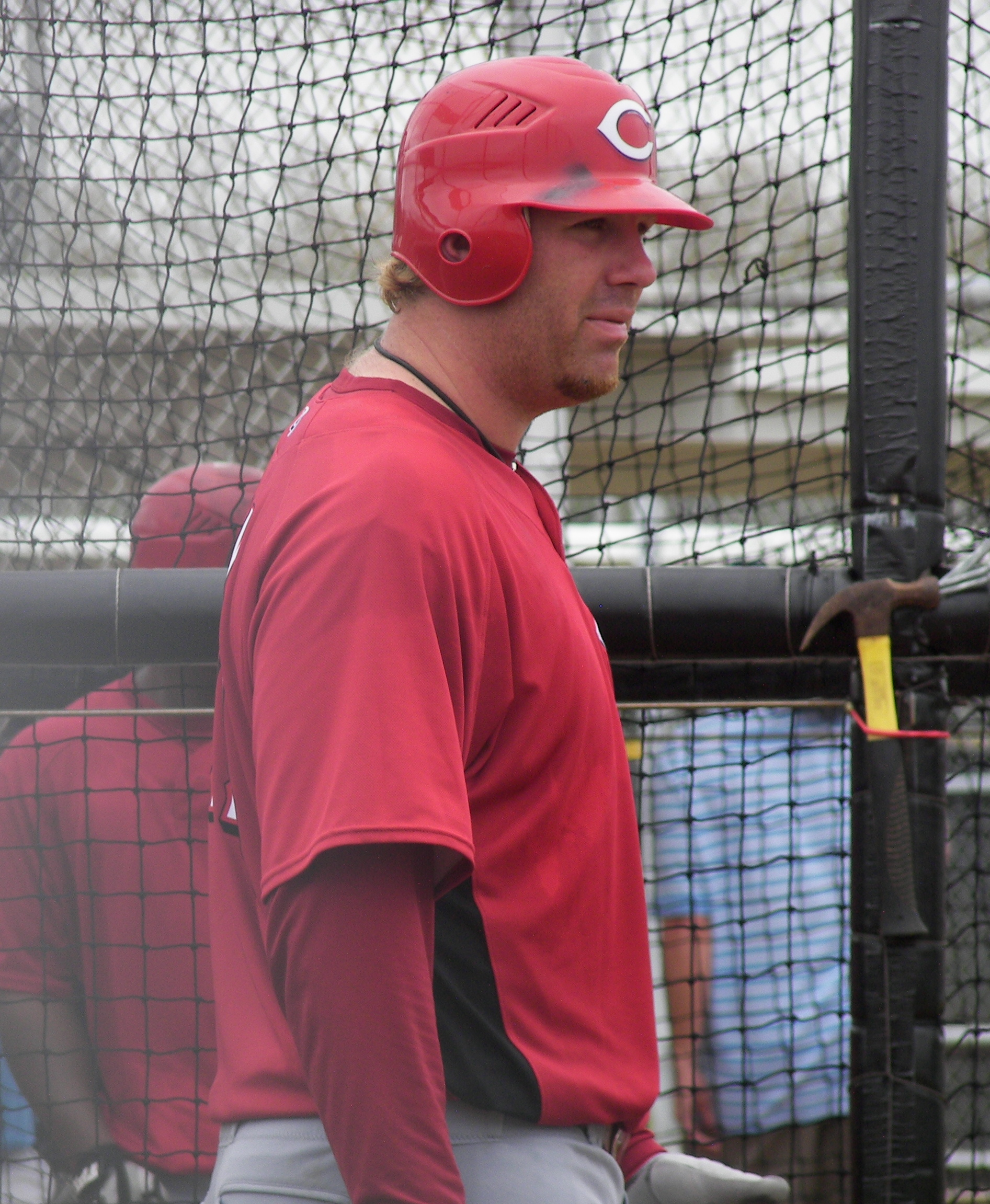
Dunn during spring training with the Reds in 2008

In 2002, Dunn hit .249 with 26 home runs and 76 RBIs as well as a career-high 128 walks and a .400 on-base percentage. At mid-season, Dunn was hitting .300 with 17 home runs and 54 RBIs, earning him a selection to the 2002 National League All-Star team. In that game, Dunn hit a ball to center field that was a few feet from being a game ending home run (the game famously ended in a tie). He also walked in his only other plate appearance.

Dunn's 2003 season was a steep decline from his previous All-Star campaign as he hit just .215 with 27 home runs and 57 RBIs. Along with his struggles at the plate, Dunn led all major league outfielders in errors, with 10, and suffered a thumb sprain while attempting a diving catch in mid-August that forced him to miss the remainder of the season.

Dunn's most productive season came in 2004, when he posted career highs in batting average (.266), home runs (46), runs (105), hits (151), slugging percentage (.569), and on-base plus slugging (OPS) (.957). On September 30, 2004, Dunn once again got his name in Major League Baseball's record book. That day, Dunn struck out three times against Chicago Cubs right-hander Mark Prior, raising his season total to 191 and surpassing Bobby Bonds' single season strikeout record of 189, set in 1970. He finished the season with 195 strikeouts and had a strikeout percentage of 34.3%, both of which led all of MLB. He held the record until Ryan Howard broke it on September 27, 2007. On August 10, 2004, Dunn hit the longest home run in the history of Great American Ball Park, a 535-foot blast to straightaway center that went over the batter's eye and bounced off Mehring Way into a section of the Ohio River that is considered part of Kentucky. As of June 2025, it is the fourth-longest home run in MLB history and the longest since 1971.

Dunn's 46 home runs in 2004 were the fourth most in Cincinnati Reds history. That year, he joined Hall of Fame second baseman Joe Morgan as the only Reds players to score 100 runs, drive in 100 runs, and draw 100 walks in a single season.

Dunn's 2005 season was similar to the previous year, with a slight dip in production as he hit .247 with 40 home runs and 101 RBIs while once again leading in strikeouts (168) and strikeout percentage (30.9%). By reaching the 40 home run plateau for a second consecutive season, Dunn became the fourth player in Reds history to hit 40 home runs in multiple seasons.

Prior to the start of the 2006 season, Dunn signed a 2-year, $18 million extension that bought out his final two years of arbitration, as well as a club option for a third year in 2008. Dunn once again hit 40 home runs, but once again saw a decrease in his average (.234) and RBIs (92). For the third consecutive season, Dunn led all of MLB in strikeouts (194) and strikeout percentage (34.6%). He also led all major league outfielders in errors, with 12, and had the lowest fielding percentage among left fielders, at .960.

On June 30 of that season, Dunn made Cincinnati headlines with one of the biggest home runs of his career, a walk-off grand slam to cap a 9-run rally to beat the Indians, which kept the Reds tied atop the NL Central with St. Louis.

During a lengthy rain delay on July 21, 2006, Dunn made a prank phone call from the clubhouse to Reds radio announcer Marty Brennaman. Brennaman was filling air time by taking calls from listeners, a segment he dubbed "The Banana Phone". Dunn, who identified himself as "Adam from Milwaukee" and spoke in a goofy voice, asked Brennaman if he thought Reds' first baseman Scott Hatteberg was a good player, then asked if the announcer was wearing a shirt. The clip went viral, and is frequently replayed on Cincinnati radio. In a 2012 poll, Reds fans voted the segment their all-time favorite "off-beat Marty" call.

2007 was a return to form for Dunn as he hit .264 while reaching the 40 home run and 100 RBI plateaus again, becoming the first and only Red to hit 40 home runs in four consecutive seasons. On October 31, 2007, Dunn's $13 million option was picked up by the Reds, making him the highest-paid player on the team.

Going into the final season under contract, Dunn hit .233 with 32 home runs and 74 RBIs, before being traded to Arizona.

In his 8 seasons with Cincinnati, Dunn hit 270 home runs with 646 RBIs, 755 walks and 1,212 strikeouts, all of which were within the top ten in team history.

In 2018, he was named to the Cincinnati Reds Hall of Fame.

=== Arizona Diamondbacks ===
On August 11, 2008, Dunn was traded to the Arizona Diamondbacks for right-handed pitcher Dallas Buck and two other players to be named later. Within the next month, Arizona sent catcher Wilkin Castillo and pitcher Micah Owings to the Reds to complete the trade.

In 2008, Dunn walked 19.1% of the time, the highest percentage in major league baseball; however, he also struck out 164 times in 651 plate appearances, a strikeout percentage of 31.7%. Defensively, he had the lowest fielding percentage of all starting major league left fielders, .968, and committed more errors (7) than any other NL left fielder.

With Arizona in 2008, Dunn hit .243 with 8 home runs and 26 RBIs, while walking 42 times and striking out 44. Overall between Cincinnati and Arizona, Dunn hit .236, while once again reaching exactly 40 home runs and 100 RBIs.

=== Washington Nationals ===
On February 11, 2009, Dunn agreed to a two-year, $20 million contract with the Washington Nationals. In his first game as a National, he hit a home run and had four RBIs. On July 4, 2009, he hit his 300th career home run. During the 2009 season, Dunn transitioned to first base. For the year, Dunn hit .267 with 38 home runs and 105 RBIs.

On July 7, 2010, Dunn hit three home runs in a single game for the first time in his career as the Nationals beat the Padres 7–6. He hit a three-run homer and two solo homers to join Alfonso Soriano as the only Nationals players to accomplish the feat at the time.

For the 2010 season, Dunn saw a slight decrease in productivity from 2009, as he hit .260 with 38 home runs and 103 RBIs, but his walk rate dropped from 17.4% to 11.9% while his strikeout rate climbed from 26.5% to 30.7%.

=== Chicago White Sox ===
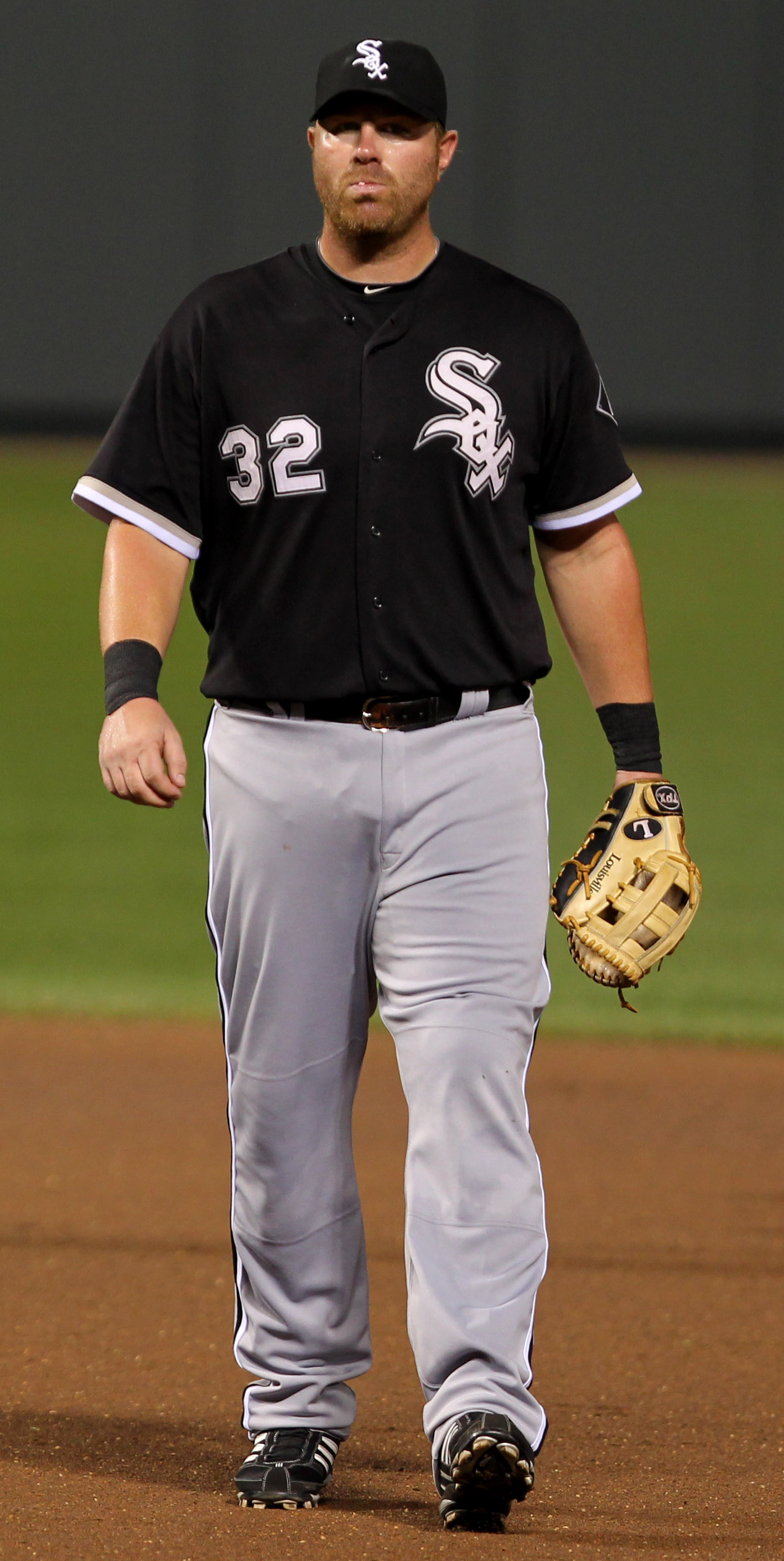
Dunn with the White Sox in 2011

On December 2, 2010, Dunn agreed to a four-year, $56 million deal with the Chicago White Sox. On April 6, 2011, Dunn underwent an appendectomy which caused him to miss five games. Prior to the appendectomy, Dunn was hitting .286 with a home run and 5 RBIs. However, after returning, Dunn struggled drastically, leading to reduced playing time as the year proceeded. He ended the season with a .159 average, .292 on-base percentage, .277 slugging percentage, .569 OPS, and 177 strikeouts, hitting only 11 home runs and recording 42 RBI, putting together by far the worst season of his career. The 177 strikeouts set a new White Sox team record for most strikeouts in a season by a batter, beating the previous record of 175 held by Dave Nicholson. Dunn's 2011 campaign was by far the worst of any player in the majors, as he batted .159 in 496 appearances at the plate. He fell six plate appearances short, however, in having the worst batting average to qualify for the batting title since Bill Bergen had hit .139 as a starter for the 1909 Brooklyn Superbas.

Through 2011, he led all active left fielders in career errors, totaling 60 errors.

Frustrated by his poor performance in 2011, Dunn pledged to change his offseason preparation so as to "not let this happen again." By the end of May 2012, Dunn surpassed his entire home run total from the year before and was leading the American League in walks.

In 2012, Dunn struck out in 36 straight games, a record for a position player until 2017, when Yankees rookie Aaron Judge struck out in 37 straight games. On July 1, Dunn was elected by his peers to the 83rd All-Star Game in Kansas City, his second career All-Star selection and one of four White Sox selections on the season. On July 24, Dunn became the fourth left-handed White Sox player to hit 30 home runs in a season, joining Oscar Gamble, Robin Ventura and Jim Thome. He recorded his 1,000th RBI on August 13. In a game against the Kansas City Royals on August 18, Dunn hit his 35th home run of the season and 400th in his career when he connected on a two-run shot in the eighth inning, becoming the 50th MLB player to hit 400 career home runs. Dunn finished the 2012 season with a .204 batting average, 41 home runs, and 96 RBI. He also led the majors with walks (105) and strikeouts (222). He became only the 3rd player to join the 200 strikeout club and his number of strikeouts established a new American League record, falling just one short of the major league record set by Mark Reynolds in 2009.

On August 5, 2014, much to the delight of the remaining fans at U.S. Cellular Field and members of the White Sox dugout, Dunn pitched the top of the ninth inning during a demoralizing blowout loss of 16–0 to the Texas Rangers. Dunn's outing marked his first career pitching appearance and he didn't disappoint, as the power hitting DH landed his first pitch, a 78-mph fastball, for a called strike to Rangers shortstop Elvis Andrus. With Dunn taking the mound and Leury Garcia pitching earlier in the season on April 16, it marked the first time since 1979 that position players pitched in two games in the same season for the White Sox.

=== Oakland Athletics ===
The White Sox traded Dunn to the Oakland Athletics on August 31, 2014, in exchange for Nolan Sanburn. Hours after the trade was announced, Dunn announced he would "probably" retire after the 2014 season. On September 1, Dunn made his first plate appearance with Oakland and hit a two-run home run against the Seattle Mariners. He became the 12th player in Athletics history to hit a home run in his first at-bat with the organization. After a few productive games early on with the A's, Dunn's performance declined and became similar to his time with Chicago. In 25 games with Oakland, he batted .212 with a .316 on-base percentage, two home runs and 10 RBIs. Dunn is one of fourteen players to have played 2,000 games without making the postseason, as Dunn played in 2,001 games, which was the longest for any active player at the time of his retirement . On the last day of the season, the Athletics clinched the second AL Wild Card spot, which meant he was on a postseason roster for the first (and last) time. However, he did not make an appearance in the AL Wild Card Game, which ended with a 9–8 loss to the Kansas City Royals. Dunn confirmed his retirement after the game.

== International career ==
On March 1, 2009, Dunn joined the United States team for the 2009 World Baseball Classic at the late request of coach Davey Johnson. In a first-round game against Canada in Toronto on March 7, he hit a two-run home run and batted in a run on a sacrifice fly play. The next day, Dunn hit a long solo home run and scored on a three-run triple by Chris Iannetta in a blowout victory over Venezuela. During the tournament, Dunn tied for the team lead with 3 home runs, batting .304 with 9 walks and 10 strikeouts in 8 games.

== Post-playing career ==
Dunn was selected to appear on the ballot for the 2020 Baseball Hall of Fame vote but was eliminated in his first year of eligibility. He was inducted into the Reds Hall of Fame in 2018.

Dunn helped establish and manages Marucci Elite Texas, a traveling club team that competes in national club baseball competitions.

== Player profile ==
=== Batting ===
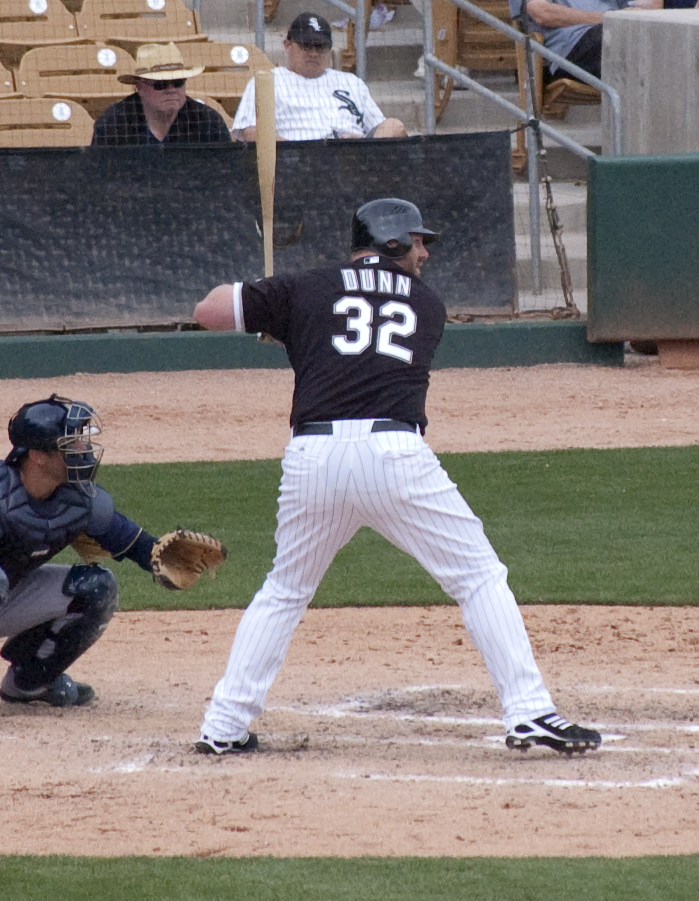
Dunn during spring training in 2011

Over the course of Dunn's career, FanGraphs calculated that he accumulated 240.1 offensive runs above average, which made him the 23rd-best offensive player in baseball for that period, between Hanley Ramirez and Gary Sheffield.

Dunn was an effective batter, despite some shortcomings: he had trouble hitting to the opposite field, making him vulnerable to the infield shift, and he lacked the speed and athleticism to consistently leg out infield hits. He exhibited outstanding power and plate discipline. As of June 2025, his 15.8% walk rate is the 40th-highest of all time among qualified hitters, just ahead of Reds teammate Joey Votto, and his at bats per home run ratio of 14.90 is the 17th-highest of all time (11th at the time of his retirement). Dunn's eight Opening Day home runs are the most of all time, tied with Frank Robinson and Ken Griffey Jr.

However, Dunn's patience at the plate contributed to his high strikeout totals; he claimed that he tended to wait for the perfect pitch, and sometimes struck out looking as a result. Throughout his career, he was among the major league leaders in number of pitches per at-bat. As of June 2025, he is third on the all-time strikeout list, with 2,379 strikeouts, although this is partially a testament to his long career: his 28.6% strikeout rate is the 107th-highest of all time among qualified hitters. In addition, Dunn's 19 golden sombreros (4+ strikeouts in a single game) are fourth-most all-time, tied with Bo Jackson . Dunn's 222 strikeouts in 2012 are the second-most strikeouts in a single season in MLB history (and the AL record), as of 2024. Dunn was only one strikeout behind Mark Reynolds' MLB record, despite finishing the season with 13 fewer plate appearances.

Viewed in totality, Dunn was a prototypical "Three True Outcomes" hitter (that is, a player who frequently walks, strikes out, and hits home runs - in other words, a player whose batting outcomes are relatively unaffected by defensive luck). For his career, Dunn walked, homered, or struck out in 49.9% of his plate appearances. At the time of his retirement, Dunn's TTO percentage was the highest figure in baseball history for players with at least 4,000 career plate appearances. MLB's official glossary entry for "Three True Outcomes" cites Dunn as "one of the more famed three-true-outcomes players in recent history."

Dunn's then-bizarre statistical profile helped pave the way for a new, statistically focused "Moneyball" style of baseball, which downplayed the negative value of strikeouts and emphasized the positive value of walks and home runs. Although Dunn was by no means the first TTO-focused baseball player - Babe Ruth's TTO rate was 46.1% in the 1920s - Dunn's career coincided with a league-wide rise in TTO-style baseball. By 2017, the leaguewide TTO rate was a record 33.5%. FiveThirtyEight wrote that "Dunn's career served as a bellwether for the growth, acceptance and, ultimately, the maturity of sabermetrics." Dunn was personally ambivalent about this trend, commenting in 2017 that "if you have nine [TTO hitters in a lineup], it's going to be tough."

Jayson Stark called Dunn "the most unique baseball player who ever lived," noting the following statistical oddities as of the 2014 season:

- Dunn's streak of five consecutive 40-homer seasons was the fourth-longest in MLB history.
- Dunn's streak of seven consecutive 38-homer seasons was the second-longest in MLB history, tied with Babe Ruth and behind only Rafael Palmeiro.
- Dunn had "almost twice as many seasons with 160-plus strikeouts (11) as anyone else in history." The next-closest player was Ryan Howard, with six.
- Dunn and Mark Reynolds had recorded eight of the thirteen 190-strikeout seasons in MLB history.
- Dunn held the record for most multiple-strikeout and three-or-more-strikeout games in MLB history.

Jon Bois and Alex Rubinstein's Secret Base video series also argued that Dunn had "the weirdest career in MLB history." An additional statistical oddity they highlighted was that while Dunn typically hit poorly against left-handed pitchers, he may have been Clayton Kershaw's greatest nemesis; Dunn's 1.692 slugging percentage against Kershaw (4 HR and 2 doubles in 14 plate appearances) is nearly double that of second-placed Anthony Rizzo.

Despite Dunn's highly respectable career production, Reds announcer Marty Brennaman criticized Dunn's lack of clutch hitting and said, "He homers; he doesn't drive in runs." For his own part, Dunn said that he tried harder to get base hits when there were runners in scoring position, but "If it's first inning, two outs, nobody on, you know I'm not going to lie to you, I'm trying to get in the seats. And you know if I strikeout, okay, you know whatever."

Dunn was also criticized for his at times prolonged offensive slumps. He admitted that "When I'm going bad, I'm the worst player in the league. There's no arguing that. When I'm in that little funk that I get in, you know, every year for 'x' amount of times, I'm the worst in the league."

=== Fielding ===
Although Dunn's batting style was relatively unaffected by defense, he was himself one of the most woeful defenders of his era. He frequently surrendered hits and extra bases to opposing batters. He is graded harshly by modern defensive analytics, including models that penalize poor defensive plays more harshly if there are fewer outs and/or men on base (e.g., Defensive Runs Saved, used by Baseball Reference), and models that treat all plays the same (e.g., Ultimate Zone Rating, used by FanGraphs). When Dunn retired in 2014, Baseball Reference said that he had cost his team more wins on defense (-29.5) than any other player since 1901. For his career, FanGraphs calculated that Dunn accumulated 252.8 defensive runs below average, over 60 runs worse than the second-worst defender, David Ortiz, who played most of his career at designated hitter.

Dunn's 2009 season was particularly woeful; his defense was rated at -35 runs by UZR and -43 runs by DRS. The latter was "the worst defensive season [rating] relative to positional average in baseball history."

Because of Dunn's polarizing statistical profile, he is commonly regarded as both a poster boy for and casualty of the sabermetric movement. At the time, sabermetric analysis had difficulty estimating the true value of defense with any precision, and analytically minded general managers tended to undervalue defense. Accordingly, Dunn's $112.7 million in career earnings nearly doubled those of his White Sox teammate Juan Pierre, even though Pierre's superior defense meant that the two players had similar career wins above replacement. SB Nation's Graham MacAree opined that if modern analytics had been in common use at the start of Dunn's career, Dunn would have quickly become a full-time DH. Instead, he was allowed to spend most of his career in the National League, which did not have the DH at the time, allowing his defense to drag down his overall production. McAree concluded that Dunn "just happened to be at the right time and the right place to be the poster child for baseball’s offensive metamorphosis while also a cautionary tale for what can go wrong with too-easy analytical thinking." FiveThirtyEight's Neil Paine agreed, writing that "Sabermetrics giveth and Sabermetrics taketh away. In the end, Dunn's career represents the maturation of statistical analysis in baseball."

During his time with the Cincinnati Reds, Dunn's defensive effort was frequently questioned. In 2007, Reds announcer Marty Brennaman complained that "I think he was overweight last year. He walks to his position. He walks off the field. You see no energy whatsoever and that disappoints the heck out of me." (Brennaman sought to make amends with Dunn when the former was inducted into the Reds Hall of Fame in 2021.) In addition, Toronto Blue Jays general manager J. P. Ricciardi publicly insinuated that Dunn "doesn't really like baseball that much," although he later apologized for his comments. Following Dunn's departure from the Reds, CBS' Gregg Doyel harshly criticized Dunn and Ken Griffey Jr. for providing poor leadership, explaining that the new-look Reds were different from "the older, beer-bellied softball teams of recent years ... lounging on the clubhouse's leather couches, hitting home runs, misplaying balls in the outfield and thinking they had it all figured out, when all they knew how to do was lose."

However, Washington Nationals general manager Mike Rizzo defended Dunn's effort, calling him "the most misunderstood player I have heard about in recent memory. The way he was misconstrued [in Cincinnati] was almost unbelievable. He plays banged up. He'd go out there 162 games if you'd let him. He's the most consistent player in the game the last six years."

== Position changes ==
In December 2005, Reds manager Jerry Narron informed the press that, due to the trade of popular first baseman Sean Casey to the Pittsburgh Pirates for left-handed pitcher Dave Williams, Dunn would be moving to first base for the 2006 season. However, with the acquisition of free agent first baseman Scott Hatteberg (who played for the Oakland Athletics in 2005) during spring training and the March 20 trade of outfielder Wily Mo Peña to the Boston Red Sox for right-handed pitcher Bronson Arroyo, the plan to convert Dunn was scrapped. Dunn had mentioned that he would rather not play first base.

After Nick Johnson was traded to the Florida Marlins, Dunn was made the Washington Nationals' everyday first baseman.

During Dunn's tenure with the Chicago White Sox, he mostly played as a designated hitter, sometimes filling in for Paul Konerko at first base in games where Konerko himself played as the DH.

== Personal life ==
Dunn is married and has four children. The family lives in Houston, Texas.

Dunn appeared in the 2013 film Dallas Buyers Club as a bartender; he is also an investor in the film.

== See also ==
- List of Major League Baseball career home run leaders
- List of Major League Baseball leaders in bases on balls
- List of Major League Baseball ultimate grand slams

Preceded by Andruw Jones	National League Player of the Month; July 2005	Succeeded by Andruw Jones
