= Ryan Howard =

American baseball player (born 1979)

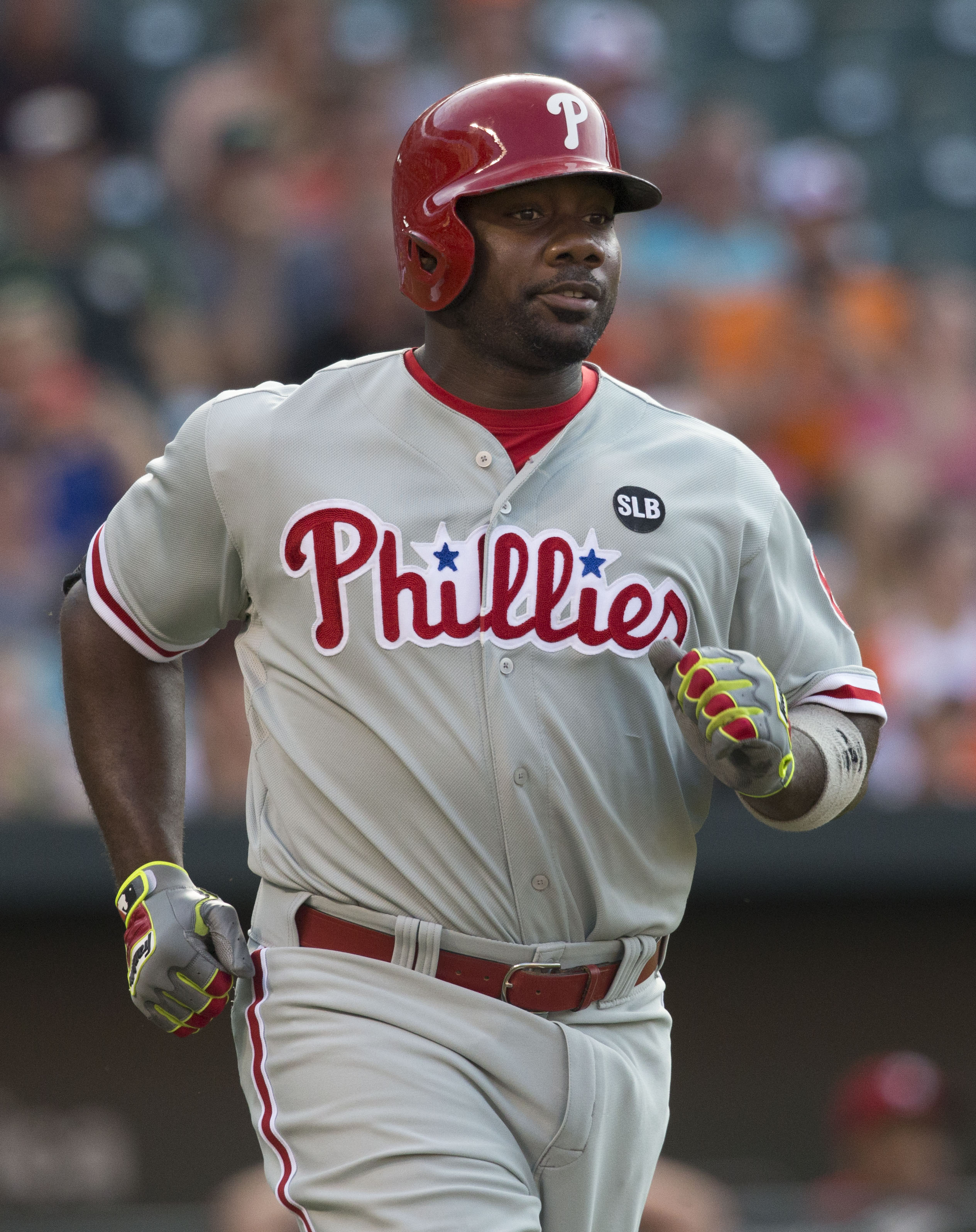
- Howard with the Philadelphia Phillies in 2015
- First baseman
- Born: November 19, 1979 (age 47); Florissant, Missouri, U.S.
- Batted: Left Threw: Left

MLB debut
- September 1, 2004, for the Philadelphia Phillies

Last MLB appearance
- October 2, 2016, for the Philadelphia Phillies

MLB statistics
- Batting average: .258
- Home runs: 382
- Runs batted in: 1,194
- Stats at Baseball Reference

Teams
- Philadelphia Phillies (2004–2016)

Career highlights and awards
- 3× All-Star (2006, 2009, 2010); World Series champion (2008); NL MVP (2006); NL Rookie of the Year (2005); NLCS MVP (2009); Silver Slugger Award (2006); NL Hank Aaron Award (2006); 2× MLB home run leader (2006, 2008); 3× MLB RBI leader (2006, 2008, 2009)

Ryan James Howard (born November 19, 1979), nicknamed "the Big Piece", is an American former professional baseball first baseman. Howard spent his entire Major League Baseball (MLB) career playing for the Philadelphia Phillies, from 2004 to 2016. He is known for being the fastest player in baseball history to reach both 100 home runs and 200 home runs. Howard holds numerous Phillies franchise records.

Howard made his MLB debut in 2004. He won the National League (NL) Rookie of the Year Award in 2005 and the NL Most Valuable Player (MVP) Award in 2006. Howard was a three-time NL All-Star (2006, 2009, 2010), and won the Silver Slugger Award, Hank Aaron Award, and the NL Championship Series MVP Award in 2009. Known for his power, Howard is a member of the 50 home run club. He was a two-time NL home run champion (2006, 2008), and became the fastest player to reach both the 100 and 200 home run milestones in MLB history, passing the marks in 2007 and 2009, respectively. He is also tied with Sammy Sosa for the most National League 140 RBI seasons at three and the most National League 130 RBI seasons at four. From 2006 to 2009, he hit 198 home runs, hitting at least 45 in each season. By the time he reached thirty years old, he had hit 222 home runs in 732 games. Over the remaining 840 games of his career, he proceeded to hit 160 home runs before playing his last major league game at the age of 36.

== Amateur career ==
Howard was born in Florissant, Missouri. He attended Lafayette High School in Wildwood, Missouri, and Missouri State University (then Southwest Missouri State), where he played college baseball for the Bears from 1998 to 2001. Howard finished his collegiate career with 50 home runs, 183 runs batted in (RBIs), and a .335 career batting average in 172 games played. He was the 1999 Missouri Valley Conference Freshman of the Year. Missouri State retired Howard's number on December 18, 2010. He played one summer in the Central Illinois Collegiate League, a league partially funded by Major League Baseball (MLB) for future prospects to develop.

== Professional career ==
=== Minor leagues ===
The Philadelphia Phillies selected Howard in the fifth round of the 2001 draft and assigned him to the Batavia Muckdogs of the New York–Penn League. Howard ascended the Phillies' minor league system, earning consecutive awards in the Florida State League and Eastern League in 2003 and 2004, respectively. Howard also set the single-season home run record for the Reading Phillies, with 37 in 102 games. On July 31, he was promoted to the Scranton/Wilkes-Barre Red Barons of the Class AAA International League. He became just the fifth minor league player since 1956 to hit at least 46 home runs. He was named by Major League Baseball one of the best first basemen in Philadelphia Phillies History. Howard won the Joe Bauman Home Run Award in the process. While doing this, he impressed scouts enough that general managers of several teams tried to lure the Phillies' Ed Wade into trading him, as Jim Thome was blocking his path to the majors. Howard's No. 29 was retired by the Lakewood Blueclaws in 2010.

=== Philadelphia Phillies ===
==== 2004 – September call-up ====
On September 1, Howard made his first Major League plate appearance, striking out against Jaret Wright in a pinch-hit at-bat (for Vicente Padilla) in a 7–2 loss to the Atlanta Braves. On September 6, Howard logged his first Major League hit in a single at-bat during a 3–1 loss to the Braves; on September 8, he recorded his first multi-hit game with a double and a single in a 4–1 win over the Braves. On September 11, Howard hit his first Major League home run off Bartolomé Fortunato, driving in his first RBI and scoring his first run in an 11–9 win over the New York Mets.

Howard had 42 plate appearances in 19 games with the Phillies in 2004. He posted a .282 batting average with two home runs and five RBI; he also hit five doubles, drew two walks, and was hit by a pitch. Between playing for the Double-A Reading Phillies, Triple-A Scranton/Wilkes-Barre Red Barons and, the Philadelphia Phillies, Howard hit 48 home runs, which was tied for the highest total in organized baseball in 2004, along with Adrián Beltré of the Los Angeles Dodgers.

==== 2005 – Rookie of the Year ====
On May 15, Howard recorded his first three-hit game, going 3-for-4 with a double, two singles, and a run-scored in a 4–3 win over the Cincinnati Reds. On July 3, Howard recorded his first three-RBI game, against the Braves. On August 23, he notched his first four-hit game, going 4-for-5 with a double, a home run, two singles, three RBI and three runs scored in a 10–2 win over the San Francisco Giants. On July 1, Howard became the Phillies' everyday first baseman when Thome was sidelined for the season with an elbow injury.

Howard was named National League (NL) Rookie of the Month in September. He batted .278 with 10 home runs and 22 runs batted in. In honor of winning the award, he received a specially designed trophy.

Howard led all major league rookies with 22 home runs and posted a .288 average and 63 RBI in just 312 at-bats and 88 games. He hit 11 home runs and 27 RBI in September and October. Howard finished his rookie season with 17 doubles, two triples, 52 runs scored, and 100 strikeouts and 63 runs batted in as the Phillies battled the Houston Astros for the NL wild card until getting eliminated on the last day of the season. Howard was rewarded for his effort by being named NL Rookie of the Year, the fourth Phillie to win the award. He was also voted the Baseball Prospectus Internet Baseball Awards NL Rookie of the Year and received the NLBM Larry Doby Legacy Award (NL Rookie of the Year).

After the 2005 season, the Phillies faced a dilemma involving Thome and Howard. Both were very talented and proven power hitters; Thome was the biggest free agent player the Phillies signed prior to the 2003 season, but Howard was the reigning Rookie of the Year and a promising young player. Before the 2006 season, the Phillies traded Thome for outfielder Aaron Rowand and minor league pitching prospects Gio González and Daniel Haigwood in order to make room for Howard.

==== 2006 – MVP season ====
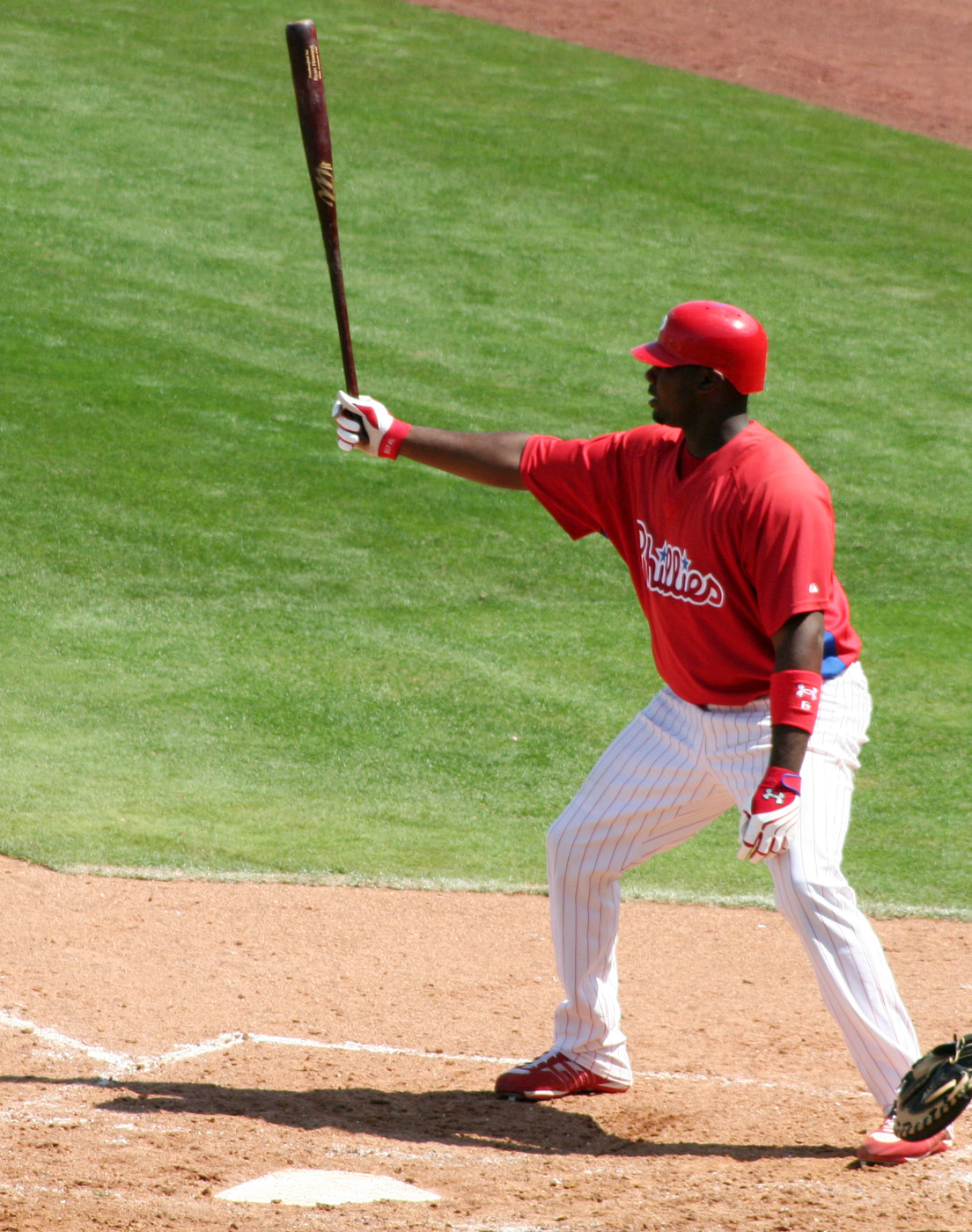
An example of Howard's signature stance before taking a pitch.

Howard began the 2006 season as the Phillies' starting first baseman. Howard hit his first home run of the season on April 3, off the Cardinals' Chris Carpenter. On April 23, Howard became the first player to hit a home run into Ashburn Alley at Citizens Bank Park. The home run traveled 496 feet (151 m) and was hit off Sergio Mitre of the Florida Marlins. It was the first of two Howard hit in the game, the first multi-home run game of his career. From May 20 to 29, Howard had at least one RBI in nine consecutive games. During that stretch, Howard hit six home runs and drove in 17 runs. He also became the first player to hit a home run into the third deck of the park in right field when he connected off Mike Mussina on June 20, a 437-foot (133 m) long-ball that was again his first of two home runs. To honor the home run, the Phillies painted a white H on the seat where the ball was caught. Howard collected seven RBI on the two home runs and a triple in the 9–7 loss, becoming the first Phillies batter to drive in seven runs since pitcher Robert Person on June 2, 2002.

Howard was named to his first All-Star game at PNC Park in Pittsburgh as a reserve first baseman, by the player ballot. He participated in the Century 21 Home Run Derby prior to the game, and won the contest with a total of 23 home runs, defeating the New York Mets' third baseman David Wright in the final round. Howard was the second consecutive Phillie to win the Derby, with Bobby Abreu hitting a record 41 home runs in 2005. Howard went 0 for 1 with a groundout in the All Star Game. On July 30, against the Marlins, Howard tied a Major League record by walking five times, including an intentional walk in the eighth inning.

From August 25 to 29, Howard hit home runs in four consecutive games; on the 29th, Howard hit his 48th home run of the season to tie Mike Schmidt for the Phillies single-season record. On August 31, Howard hit a home run into the upper deck of RFK Stadium to surpass Schmidt as the Phillies' single-season home run record holder.

On September 3, Howard went 4-for-4 with three home runs and a double in an 8–7 win over the Atlanta Braves, to become the first Philadelphia Phillies batter and the 24th player in Major League history to hit 50 home runs in a season. Howard became the first player to reach 50 home runs in a season since Andruw Jones, who hit 51 home runs the previous year. Reaching 52 home runs in the game, Howard also broke Ralph Kiner's 1947 record for home runs in a sophomore season, becoming just the second batter to hit 50 home runs in a second season. Howard's performance from August 28 to September 3 earned him NL Player of the Week. During that span, Howard batted .571 with six home runs and 12 runs batted in. On September 5, Howard was named the NL Player of the Month for August. His 41 runs batted in were the most any player had in one month since Frank Howard had 41 in July 1962. With 14 home runs, he also set new franchise records for both statistics in the month of August. On September 22, Howard became the 8th player in history to hit 58 home runs in a season, belting a three-run round-tripper off Marlins pitcher Ricky Nolasco. On September 22, Howard became the first hitter to drive in 140 runs since David Ortiz in 2005. On September 27, in a game against the Nationals, Howard walked for the 100th time in the ninth inning. He was also be walked intentionally in the eleventh and thirteenth inning. Howard became the first Phillies' batter to walk 100 or more times since Thome in 2004.

Howard finished the 2006 season with a .313 batting average, 58 home runs, and 149 runs batted in. He also set the Phillies' franchise record with 37 intentional walks. Howard and Ortiz were the only hitters to hit 50 or more home runs that season. Howard's 58 home runs was the most by a player in his sophomore season. In the process, Howard became the first Phillies' batter to win the home run title since Jim Thome did it in 2003.

On October 2, Howard was named the NL Player of the Month for September. Howard, who also won the award in August, became the first player since Albert Pujols in May and June 2003, to win the award back-to-back.

On October 10, Howard was named The Sporting News 2006 Player of the Year. On October 25, Howard was awarded the 2006 NL Hank Aaron Award.

On November 8, Howard was named by his fellow major league players as the Player of the Year and the National League Outstanding Position Player in the 2006 Players Choice Awards balloting. He succeeded Atlanta Braves outfielder Andruw Jones, the 2005 winner of both awards. On the same day, following a 5–3 win over Nippon Professional Baseball that capped a five-game international sweep by the MLB in the Major League Baseball Japan All-Star Series, Howard was named the Series MVP; he hit .558 with eight runs, three doubles, four homers and eight RBI. On November 10, Howard was awarded the National League Silver Slugger Award at first base.

On November 20, Howard won the National League MVP award, and became one of four players in baseball history to win the Rookie of the Year and MVP awards in consecutive seasons, joining Cal Ripken Jr. and later joined by Dustin Pedroia and Kris Bryant.

Howard received the Babe Ruth Home Run Award for leading MLB in home runs. He also received the Pride of Philadelphia Award from the Philadelphia Sports Hall of Fame.

Howard received the NLBM Oscar Charleston Legacy Award (NL MVP) and the NLBM Josh Gibson Legacy Award (NL home-run leader).

The Philadelphia Baseball Writers' Association of America awarded him the third annual Mike Schmidt Most Valuable Player honor.

==== 2007 ====
On March 2, 2007, the Phillies renewed Howard's contract in a one-year deal for $900,000, the highest salary ever offered to a player not eligible for salary arbitration.

On May 9, Howard hit his fourth career grand slam, against Arizona Diamondbacks pitcher Brandon Medders, when he came into the game as a pinch hitter for Wes Helms. On May 13, Howard was placed on the disabled list with a left quadriceps strain after missing five straight games. Howard fielded grounders for about 45 minutes before the Phillies game with the Toronto Blue Jays on May 20. Howard returned to the lineup on May 25, after a rehabilitation assignment with the class A Lakewood team as a designated hitter. He hit a home run in his first at-bat there. On May 27, he hit two home runs in a win that helped the Phillies sweep the Braves.

On June 27, Howard hit a 461-foot (141 m) home run, and became the fastest player in Major League Baseball history to hit 100 home runs. The accomplishment was achieved in only 325 games, 60 games fewer than the 385 games that Ralph Kiner needed to hit his first 100 home runs from 1946 to 1948.

Though Howard did not compete in the 2007 MLB All-Star Game, he was chosen to compete in the 2007 Major League Baseball Home Run Derby for the second straight year in order to defend his title. However, Howard only hit three home runs in the first round and did not advance.

After coming back from the DL, Howard had a "power surge", as he quickly climbed to second on the home run leaders list in the National League. On July 25, Howard hit a walk-off home run in the 14th inning to give the Phillies a victory over the Washington Nationals.

On September 27, Howard established a new major league record by striking out for his 196th and 197th time, breaking the old record of 195 (he tied it on September 23), set by Adam Dunn in 2004. He ended the season with 199 strikeouts, striking out an NL-highest 37.6% of the time.

Howard's final 2007 season totals were a .268 average, with 47 home runs and 136 runs batted in, helping the Phillies win the National League East title on the final day of the season to earn their first postseason berth since the 1993 World Series. The Phillies were swept by the Colorado Rockies (who had won a one-game playoff against the San Diego Padres for the NL Wild Card) in the 2007 National League Division Series; Howard homered off Jeremy Affeldt in Game Two, but struck out seven times in his other 11 at-bats.

==== 2008 ====
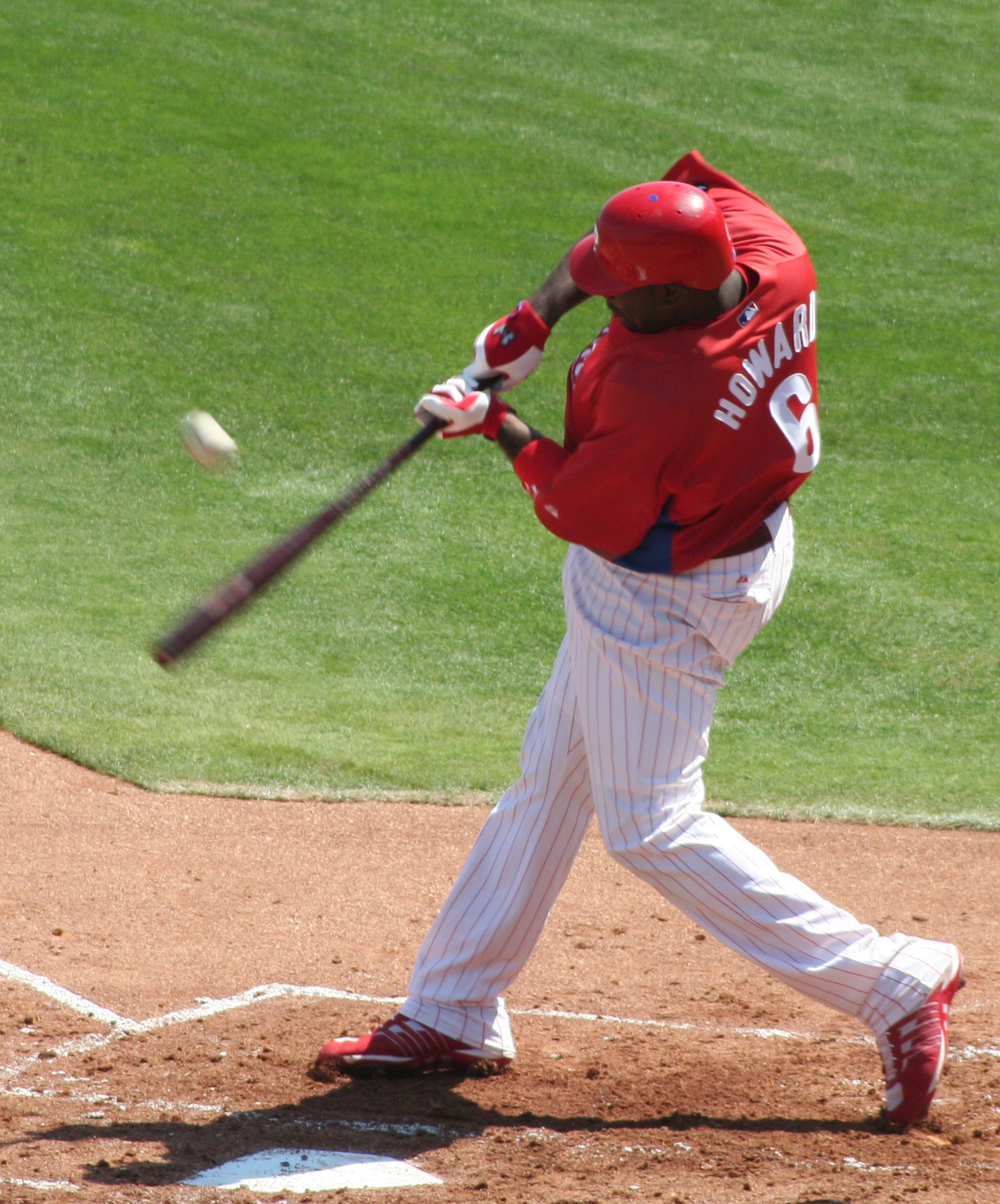
Howard swinging at a pitch

On February 21, 2008, Howard won an arbitration case against the Phillies, and was awarded $10 million, the most ever for a victorious player and tied for the most ever awarded. The Phillies had offered $7 million to Howard in salary.

Howard began the 2008 season in a slump, finishing the month of April with a batting average of just .172 and going 2-for-25 to close out the month. He fared better in May, averaging .238 with ten home runs and 30 RBI for the month, and finishing out May just north of the Mendoza Line with an overall batting average of .205. Howard hit his 15th home run of the season in a 7–3 loss to the Florida Marlins on May 30, and teammate Chase Utley hit his 15th homer on May 25. The two became the first pair of Phillies to hit 15 home runs each before June.

On June 13, Howard hit two home runs and had five RBI, in a 20–2 win over the St. Louis Cardinals. This included the second of a first-inning set of back-to-back-to-back Philadelphia home runs. It was the seventh time that the Phillies had hit three consecutive home runs, the first since May 18, 2004, and the fourth occurrence by any team in the 2008 Major League Baseball season. On June 16, Howard again hit two home runs and drove in four in an 8–2 win over the Boston Red Sox for his 15th career multi-homer game; the four-day span between multi-homer games was the shortest of his career. In stark contrast, Howard went 0-for-4 the next night with four strikeouts in a 3–0 loss for his tenth career golden sombrero. Howard drove in his 100th run of the 2008 season on August 11, against the Los Angeles Dodgers, marking his third consecutive season with at least 100 RBI.

Howard finished the 2008 season with 146 RBI and a .251 batting average. His contributions again helped lead the Phillies to the division title and the postseason. Against Milwaukee in the first round he batted a mere .182 and only drove in one run. Things picked up as he delivered with a .300 batting average against the Dodgers in the next round, although he only delivered two RBI and still remained in his home run drought in the postseason. However, as the Phillies advanced to the World Series he finally started delivering significantly with six RBI, .286 batting average, and three home runs (which tied Donn Clendenon's 1969 World Series record for most home runs in a five-game Series) – two of which came in game 4 (in which he also drove in five runs) as the Phillies took a commanding 3–1 series lead. The Phillies eventually won the series in five games to bring the Phillies their first World Series championship since 1980, and Philadelphia their first major sports championship since 1983; he finished second in the voting for the 2008 NL MVP award, behind Albert Pujols of the St. Louis Cardinals. Howard won his second Babe Ruth Home Run Award and his second Josh Gibson Legacy Award, leading MLB with 48 home runs.

==== 2009 ====
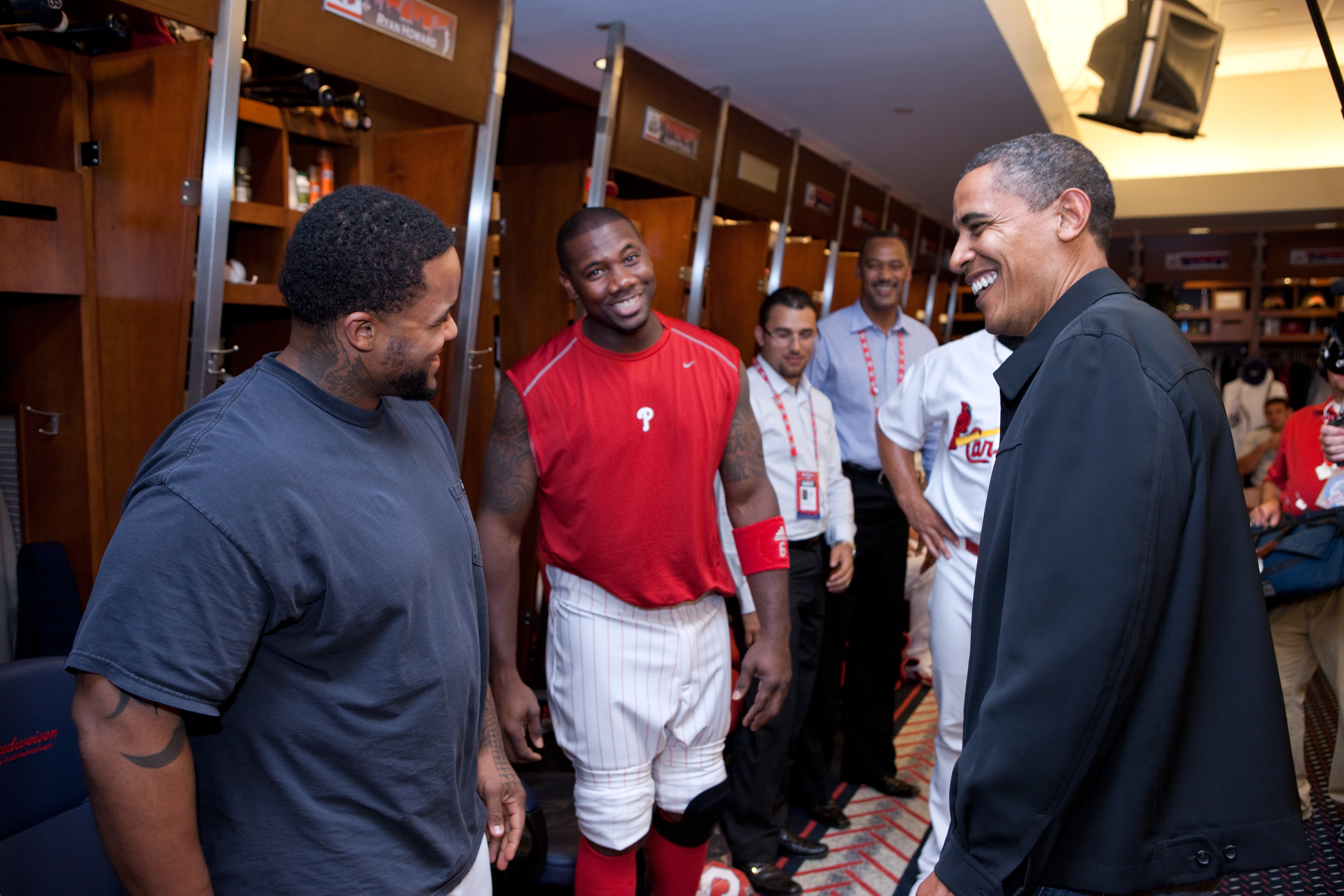
Barack Obama talks with Howard and Prince Fielder (left), before the start of the MLB All-Star Game.

On February 8, the Phillies and Howard agreed on a 3-year, $54 million contract that bought out his remaining three years of salary arbitration eligibility. In spring training, Howard led all players in home runs, with 10.

On May 4, Howard hit his second grand slam of the year, the seventh in his career, against the St. Louis Cardinals at Busch Stadium. On May 30, he hit his third grand slam of the season off Washington Nationals pitcher Shairon Martis. The grand slam landed in the third deck in the first row above the Powerade sign in right field at Citizens Bank Park and was estimated at 475 feet (145 m). The grand slam put Howard ahead of Mike Schmidt, who had seven grand slams in his career, putting him first all-time in Phillies franchise history.

Howard was named to the 2009 National League All-Star team and also competed in the Home Run Derby.

On June 20, Howard was checked into the hospital early that morning with a 104-degree fever, but pinch-hit later that day, hitting a home run. A month later, against the Florida Marlins on July 16, Howard hit his 200th career home run, making him the fastest player ever to that mark. It took Howard 658 games to reach 200 long-balls, beating out the previous titleholder, Ralph Kiner (706 games).

In August, Howard hit 11 home runs with 33 runs batted in, after just six the month before. On August 24, in a game against the New York Mets, Howard went 2 for 5 with 2 home runs and 5 runs batted in. Howard also recorded his 100th runs batted in of the season. This marked the fourth consecutive season that Howard had reached the 100-runs-batted-in mark. His batting average in the month was .299, raising his overall average to .275. He was named the NL Player of the Month for these achievements. Howard was named NL Player of the Week on August 31. Howard hit 5 home runs, 12 runs batted in, 28 total bases, and a 1,000 slugging percentage during that stretch. On September 18, in a game against the Braves, Howard hit his 39th and 40th home run of the season. This marked the fourth time in his career he had hit 40 or more home runs in a season. On October 3, Howard hit his 45th home run of the season and became only the third player in Major League Baseball history (joining Babe Ruth from 1926 to 1931 and Sammy Sosa from 1998 to 2001) to amass at least 135 RBI and 45 home runs in four consecutive seasons.

Howard ended the season tied with Milwaukee Brewers first baseman Prince Fielder for the major league lead in RBI with 141.

In the 2009 National League Division Series (NLDS) against the Colorado Rockies, Howard hit a game-tying double with two outs in the top of the ninth off of closer Huston Street. Howard scored the winning run on a Jayson Werth single. After tying Lou Gehrig's record for the most consecutive postseason games with an RBI, Howard won the NLCS MVP award on October 21. However, Howard struggled against the New York Yankees during the 2009 World Series, in which he struck out a record 13 times, passing the mark previously set by Willie Wilson in 1980.

==== 2010 ====
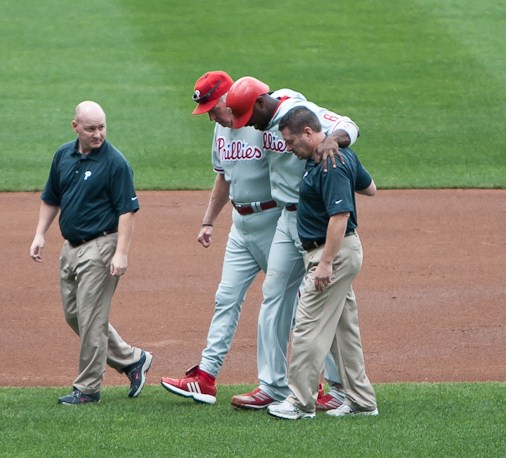
Howard injured his ankle on August 1, 2010.

On April 26, 2010, Howard signed a 5-year, $125 million extension with a club option to the contract he inked before the 2009 season. He was also the first designated hitter in an NL ballpark during a regular-season game when the Phillies played as the road team against the Toronto Blue Jays in Citizens Bank Park on June 25. Major League Baseball moved the interleague series to Philadelphia due to the G-20 Summit taking place near the Rogers Centre in Toronto.

On August 1, Howard sprained his ankle while returning to second base on a baserunning play, and was placed on the 15-day disabled list.

On August 24, Howard was ejected in the 14th inning by third base umpire Scott Barry for arguing a check-swing strikeout. With no offensive reserves left the Phillies moved left fielder Raúl Ibañez to first base and sent pitcher Roy Oswalt to play left field.

On September 8, Howard hit his 250th home run in only 855 games, which surpassed Ralph Kiner as the quickest player in history to reach that milestone.

On September 18, Howard hit his 30th homer of the season, setting a franchise record with five consecutive 30-homer, 100-RBI seasons. He had been tied with Chuck Klein, who had four consecutive 30-homer, 100-RBI seasons from 1929 to 1932. On defense, he led all major league first basemen in errors for the third year in a row, with 14.

Howard was listed with teammates Chase Utley, Jamie Moyer, and Roy Halladay as one of the few active players that were likely to be considered for the Hall of Fame.

==== 2011 ====
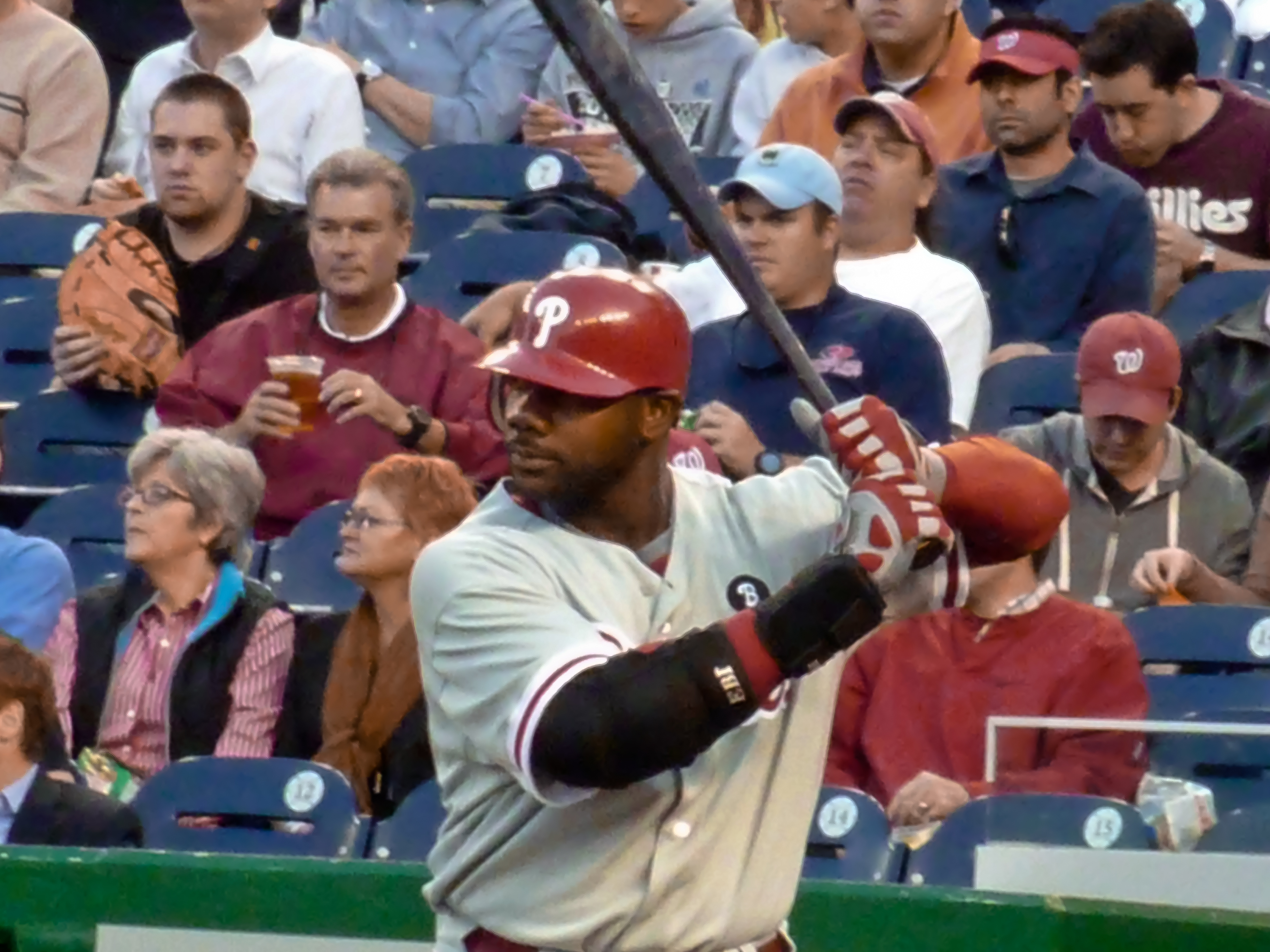
Howard at bat during a Phillies game

Through 2011, Howard was fourth among all active major leaguers in career slugging percentage (.560; behind Albert Pujols, Alex Rodriguez and Ryan Braun), and ninth in career intentional walks. During the 2011 season, Howard had a batting average of .253, 33 home runs and 116 RBI. It was his sixth consecutive 30 home run and 100 RBI season, a Phillies franchise record.

In Game 5 of the 2011 NLDS against the St. Louis Cardinals, Howard was the last batter to ground out before the Phillies lost the series. Howard tore his Achilles tendon when running to first base on the final play of the game, a ground out to the second baseman, Nick Punto. His injury required surgery and as a result, he missed the start of the 2012 season.

==== 2012 ====
Howard began the 2012 season on the 15-Day DL. He said in a podcast in early June that his Achilles tendon injury is "progressing at a positive pace".

On July 6, 2012, Howard was activated for his first game of the 2012 season, in which he went 2-for-4 with a double in a 5–0 Phillies loss. Howard hit his 300th career home run on September 22; however his season ended one week later on September 29 after suffering a small fracture in his big right toe. He finished the 2012 season with a .219 batting average, 14 home runs, and 56 RBI in 71 games.

==== 2013 ====
On July 8, 2013, Howard went on the disabled list, missing 6–8 weeks with a torn left meniscus. He underwent arthroscopic surgery to repair the tear and did not play for the remainder of the season. He was hitting .266, with 11 home runs and 43 RBI, at the time of his injury.

==== 2014 ====
Howard entered the 2014 season feeling rejuvenated, and looking to utilize the whole field, rather than exclusively pull the ball, as he had done in recent years. After reaching base in his first three at bats on opening day, Howard batted in the fifth position in the Phillies' second game during which they faced a left-handed pitcher; it ended a streak of 665 starts for Howard in which he batted in the fourth position.

On May 31, Howard hit a three-run home run for the 1,000th RBI of his career in an eventual loss to the New York Mets. Howard became the fastest player in MLB history to 1,000 RBI, accomplishing the feat in only 1,230 games. In 153 games of the 2014 year, Howard struck out an MLB-leading 190 times while batting .223 with 23 home runs and 95 RBI.

==== 2015 ====
In 2015, Howard batted .229, and his 23 home runs, 77 RBI and 138 strikeouts led the last-place Phillies, even though he missed the last three weeks of the season due to a left knee injury. He had the lowest batting average against left-handers among all MLB hitters (60 or more plate appearances), at .130.

==== 2016 ====
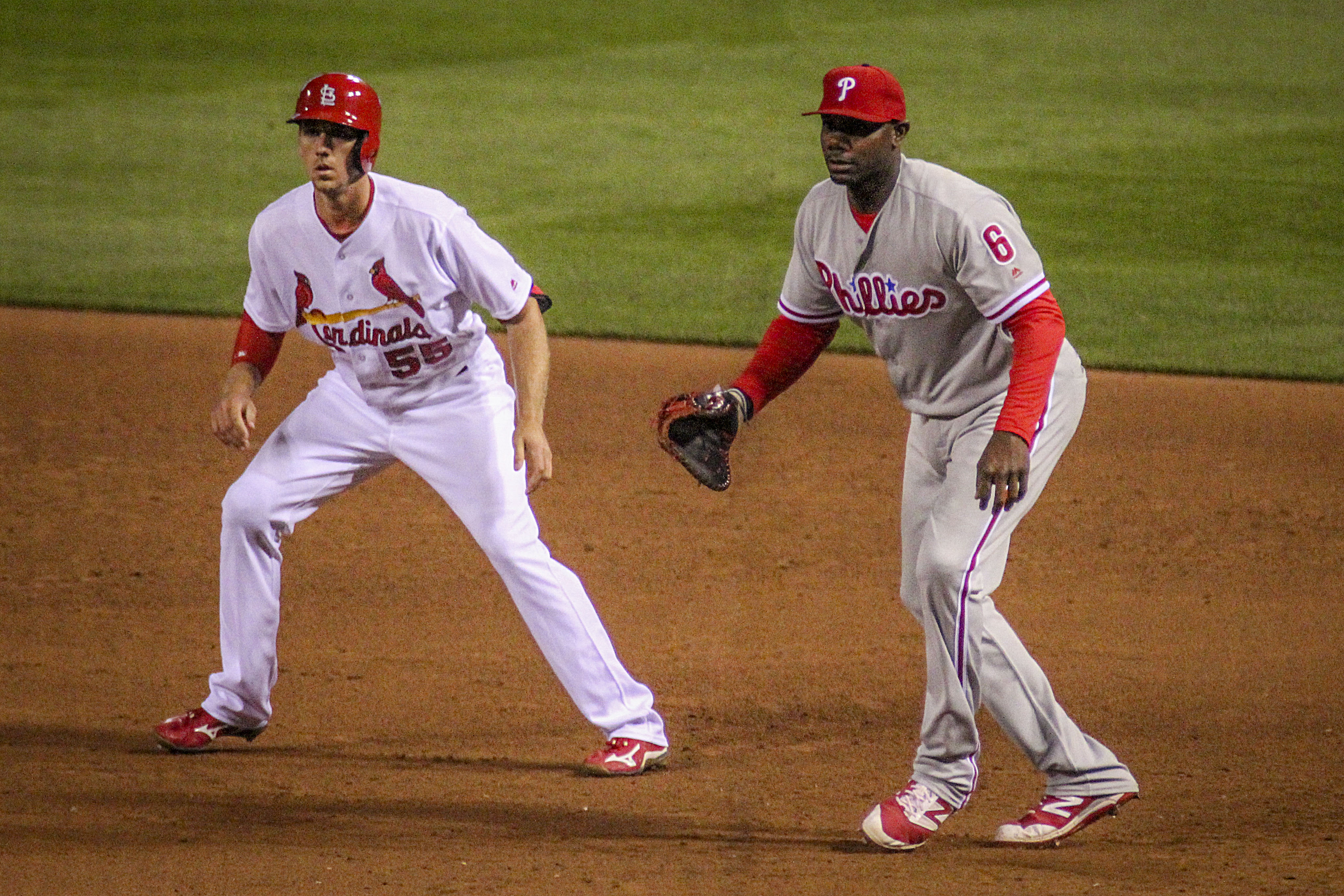
Howard holding Cardinals outfielder Stephen Piscotty in 2016

Howard began the 2016 season with a protracted slump; by late May, with his batting average at .161 after 39 games and with the arrival of a young promising first baseman in Tommy Joseph, baseball pundits asserted that the Phillies should consider simply releasing Howard and let the 36-year-old retire. On June 1, manager Pete Mackanin announced his plans to keep Howard on the bench so as to give Joseph, a rookie, more playing time at first base. Howard hit his 375th home run on August 16, 2016, versus the Dodgers. In 112 games of 2016, Howard finished with a .196 batting average, 25 home runs, and 59 RBI. On November 2, the Phillies declined the option for Howard that had a $23 million deal for the upcoming season, making him a free agent for the first time of his career.

=== Atlanta Braves ===
On April 6, 2017, Howard signed with the Atlanta Braves in a minor-league contract. Howard started with Braves extended spring training in Florida before he was assigned to the Gwinnett Braves of the International League. If he was added to the 40-man roster, he would have received a $120,000 minor-league salary or a $750,000 major-league salary, plus potential bonuses based on plate appearances. Braves general manager John Coppolella explained that Howard's signing was "just a no-risk proposition for a player with good makeup who was excellent in the second half last season, he's in good shape and has been training and waiting for an opportunity." However, he hit just .184 with one home run and 11 strikeouts in 42 plate appearances for Gwinnett, and was released on May 8.

=== Colorado Rockies ===
On August 12, 2017, Howard agreed to a minor league contract with the Colorado Rockies and was assigned to the Triple-A Albuquerque Isotopes. In 16 games for the Triple–A Albuquerque Isotopes, Howard batted just .192/.185/.442 with 3 home runs and 8 RBI. He elected free agency on November 6.

On September 4, 2018, Howard announced his retirement via an article appearing on The Players' Tribune.

=== Indianapolis Clowns (Banana Ball) ===
On October 9, 2025, Howard was named the "primetime coach" of the new Indianapolis Clowns, the sixth team in the Banana Ball Championship League. The clowns are an homage to the Indianapolis Clowns from Negro league baseball.

== Personal life ==
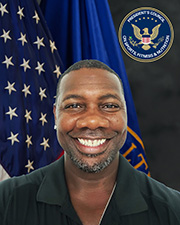
Howard as a member of the President's Council on Sports, Fitness & Nutrition

Howard has a fraternal twin brother named Corey, as well as an older brother and a sister. He says he is the smallest of the Howard sons. His favorite baseball team growing up was the St. Louis Cardinals. Howard has a son who was born on January 26, 2001. Howard graduated from Lafayette High School (Wildwood, St. Louis County, Mo.) in 1998, where he played trombone. While attending Missouri State University he became a member of the Phi Beta Sigma fraternity and his line name was "Blue Hurt". Howard is a representative for a number of products including Under Armour and the Subway restaurant chain. He also appeared on the cover of MLB 08: The Show.

Howard appeared alongside teammate Chase Utley as himself on the 2010 episode of It's Always Sunny in Philadelphia "The Gang Gets Stranded in the Woods". He also appeared as himself during the 7th season of Entourage in the episode "Lose Yourself" and appeared in the final season of The Office, which is set in Scranton and was created during his time in Triple-A there. Howard is the acknowledged namesake of one of the show's characters, who in one episode claimed to be "Ryan Howard, the baseball player" in an attempt to gain entry into a New York nightclub.

Howard married former Philadelphia Eagles cheerleader Krystle Campbell in Maui on December 1, 2012. They are Catholic.

A longstanding lawsuit between Howard and his family over finances was settled in November 2014.

On January 5, 2016, it was announced Howard had filed a lawsuit suing Al Jazeera for defamation following the publication's release of the documentary episode "The Dark Side: Secrets of the Sports Dopers", which linked Howard and Washington Nationals infielder Ryan Zimmerman, among others, to a clinic that allegedly distributed steroids and HGH. Zimmerman also filed suit against Al Jazeera for defamation.

In May 2017, Howard announced his new role as Partner at SeventySix Capital, a Philadelphia-based venture capital firm led by Wayne Kimmel and Jon Powell.

Howard has written six children's books with co-authors Erwin Madrid and his wife, Krystle Howard, published by Scholastic.

The sale of Howard's palatial beachfront mansion in Belleair Shore, Florida, for $16.5 million was announced on January 30, 2019.

In February 2019, Howard joined ESPN as an analyst for Baseball Tonight.

On April 6, 2019, Howard announced he and his wife were expecting a baby girl.

On March 24, 2023, President Joe Biden appointed Howard to be a member of the President's Council on Sports, Fitness, and Nutrition.

== Major league and franchise records ==
Record	Total	Season(s)	Surpassing	Date
Home runs by a Phillies batter, single season	58	2006	Mike Schmidt, 48 (1980)	49th on August 31, 2006
Home runs in a sophomore season	58	2006	Ralph Kiner, 51 (1947)	52nd on September 3, 2006
Intentional walks to a Phillies batter	37	2006	Jim Thome, 26 (2004)	27th on September 13, 2006
Fewest games for 100 home runs	325	2004–2007	Ralph Kiner, 385 (1946–1948)	100th on June 27, 2007
Home runs in first 1,000 career at-bats	85	2004–2007	Cecil Fielder, 76 (1985–1990)	77th on September 24, 2007
Fewest games for 150 home runs	495	2004–2008	Eddie Mathews, 569 (1952–1955)	150th on July 2, 2008
Strikeouts by a Phillies batter	199	2008	tied himself (2007)	199th on September 27, 2008
Career grand slams by a Phillies batter	15	2004–2016	Mike Schmidt, 7 (1972–1989)	8th on May 30, 2009
Fewest games for 200 home runs	658	2004–2009	Ralph Kiner, 706 (1946–1950)	200th on July 16, 2009
At least one RBI in consecutive postseason games in the same year	7	2009	Iván Rodríguez (2003); Bernie Williams (1999) (6 all); Carlton Fisk (1975)	October 18, 2009
At least one RBI in consecutive postseason games	8	2009	tied, Lou Gehrig (1928 and 1932)	October 19, 2009
Most strikeouts in a World Series	13	2009	Willie Wilson, 12 (1980)	November 4, 2009
Most career home runs by a player whose last name begins with H	382	2004-2016	tied, Frank Howard	382nd on September 30, 2016
Most career Golden sombreros – games with at least four strikeouts	27	2006–2015	Reggie Jackson, 23	24th on May 29, 2014

Howard was included on the ballot for the National Baseball Hall of Fame class of 2022 when it was announced on November 22, 2021. He received 8 votes and, not receiving the 5% minimum, will not appear on future ballots.

== See also ==
- List of Major League Baseball home run records
- List of Major League Baseball annual home run leaders
- List of Major League Baseball annual runs batted in leaders
- 50 home run club
- List of Major League Baseball career home run leaders
- List of Major League Baseball career slugging percentage leaders
- List of Major League Baseball players who spent their entire career with one franchise

Awards and achievements
Preceded by Jason Bay	Baseball Prospectus Internet Baseball; NL Rookie of the Year; 2005	Succeeded by Hanley Ramírez
Preceded by Chase Utley; Manny Ramirez	National League Player of the Month; August and September 2006; September 2008	Succeeded by José Reyes; Albert Pujols
Preceded by Pat Burrell & Chase Utley	Mike Schmidt Most Valuable Player; 2006	Succeeded by Jimmy Rollins
