= Joe Bauman Home Run Award =

Minor League Baseball award

- Sport: Baseball
- League: Minor League Baseball
- Awarded for: The regular season home run leader in Minor League Baseball
- Country: United States, Canada, Mexico
- Presented by: Musco Lighting

History
- First award: 2004
- Most wins: A. J. Reed (2)
- Most recent: Ryan Ward (2025)

The Joe Bauman Home Run Award, formerly known as the Round-Tripper-Award, is given to the Minor League Baseball player who hit the most regular season home runs that year. The award, first given in 2002, is named after Joe Bauman, who set a then–professional record with 72 home runs in 1954, while playing for the Roswell Rockets of the Class-C Longhorn League.

The award was named for Bauman in 2004. It is presented by Musco Lighting at the Baseball Winter Meetings each December. The winner receives a check worth $200 for every home run hit. The most recent winner of the award is Ryan Ward of the Los Angeles Dodgers organization.

== Winners ==
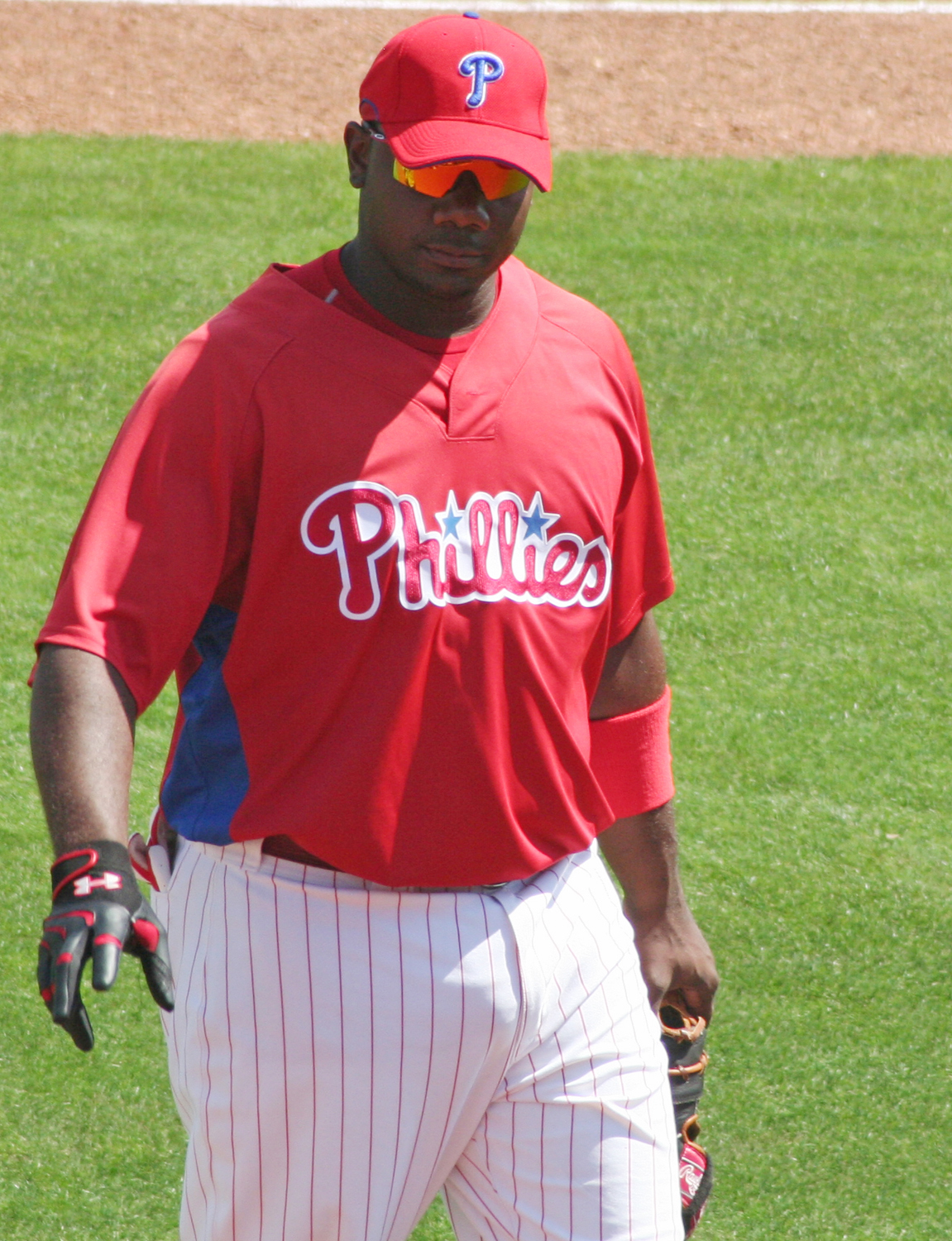
Ryan Howard

Key
(#)	Number of wins by players who have won the award multiple times
HRs	Home runs
‡	Major League Baseball All-Star

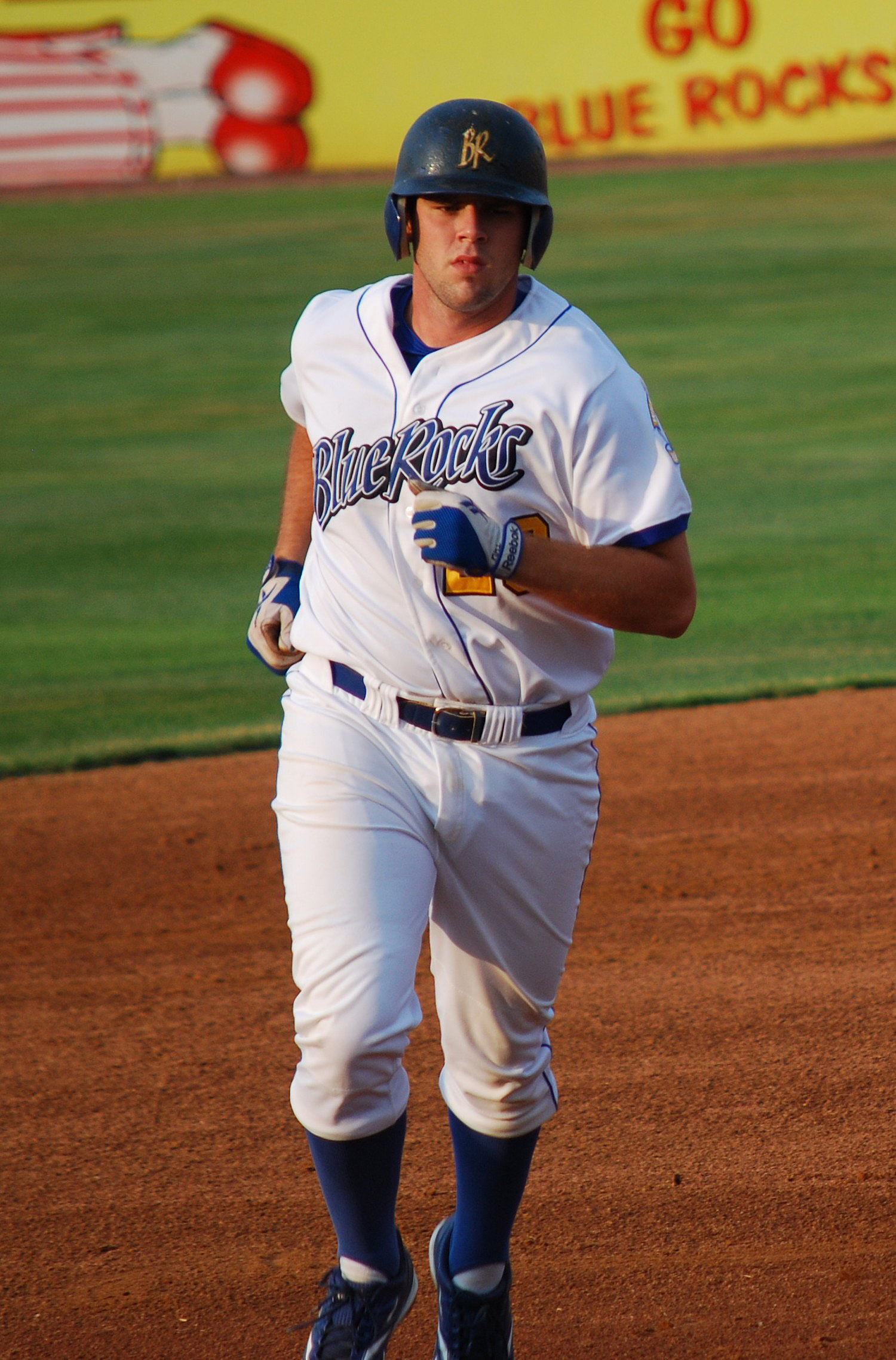
Mike Moustakas

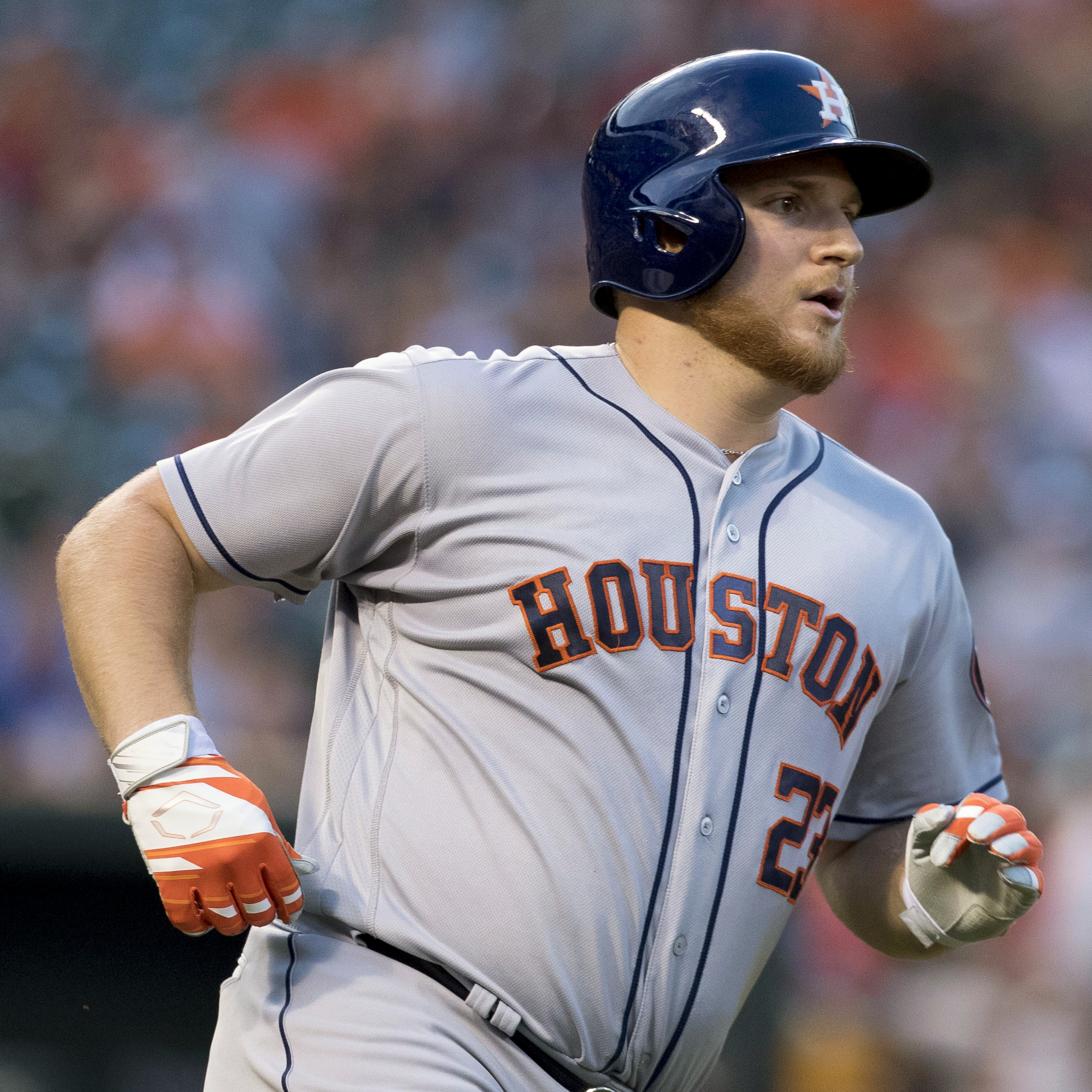
A. J. Reed

Winners
Year	Player	HRs	Minor league team(s)	MLB organization	Ref
2002	Iván Cruz	35	Memphis Redbirds	St. Louis Cardinals	
2003	Graham Koonce	34	Sacramento River Cats	Oakland Athletics	
2004	Ryan Howard^{‡}	46	Reading Phillies; Scranton/Wilkes-Barre Red Barons	Philadelphia Phillies	
2005	Brandon Wood	42	Rancho Cucamonga Quakes	Los Angeles Angels of Anaheim	
2006	Kevin Witt	36	Durham Bulls	Tampa Bay Devil Rays	
2007	Craig Brazell	39	Wichita Wranglers; Omaha Royals	Kansas City Royals	
2008	Dallas McPherson	42	Albuquerque Isotopes	Florida Marlins	
2009	Mitch Jones^{[a]}	35	Albuquerque Isotopes	Los Angeles Dodgers	
2010	Mike Moustakas^{‡}^{[b]}	36	Northwest Arkansas Naturals; Omaha Royals	Kansas City Royals	
2011	Bryan LaHair^{‡}	38	Iowa Cubs	Chicago Cubs	
2012	Darin Ruf	38	Reading Phillies	Philadelphia Phillies	
2013	Joey Gallo^{‡}	40	AZL Rangers; Hickory Crawdads	Texas Rangers	
2014	Kris Bryant^{‡}	43	Tennessee Smokies; Iowa Cubs	Chicago Cubs	
2015	A. J. Reed (1)	34	Lancaster JetHawks; Corpus Christi Hooks	Houston Astros	
2016	Dylan Cozens	40	Reading Fightin Phils	Philadelphia Phillies	
2017	A. J. Reed (2)	34	Fresno Grizzlies	Houston Astros	
2018	Pete Alonso^{‡}^{[c]}	36	Binghamton Rumble Ponies; Las Vegas 51s	New York Mets	
2019	Kevin Cron	39	Reno Aces	Arizona Diamondbacks	
2020	None selected (season cancelled due to COVID-19 pandemic)				
2021	MJ Melendez	41	Northwest Arkansas Naturals; Omaha Storm Chasers	Kansas City Royals	
2022	Moisés Gómez	39	Springfield Cardinals; Memphis Redbirds	St. Louis Cardinals	
2023	Shay Whitcomb^{‡}^{[d]}	35	Corpus Christi Hooks; Sugar Land Space Cowboys	Houston Astros	
2024	Deyvison De Los Santos	40	Amarillo Sod Poodles; Reno Aces; Jacksonville Jumbo Shrimp	Arizona Diamondbacks; Miami Marlins	
2025	Ryan Ward	36	Oklahoma City Comets	Los Angeles Dodgers	

== Notes ==
- ^{a} Jones and Jon Gaston tied with 35 home runs. Jones was declared the winner by virtue of having more runs batted in (RBIs) than Gaston (103 to 100).
- ^{b} Moustakas and Mark Trumbo tied with 36 home runs. Moustakas was declared the winner by virtue of having more RBIs than Trumbo (124 to 122).
- ^{c} Alonso and Ibandel Isabel tied with 36 home runs. Alonso was declared the winner by virtue of having more RBIs than Isabel (119 to 78).
- ^{d} Whitcomb and Yunior Severino tied with 35 home runs. Whitcomb was declared the winner by virtue of having more RBIs than Severino (102 to 84).

== See also ==
- Minor league baseball awards
- Babe Ruth Home Run Award
- Mel Ott Award
