= Golden sombrero =

Striking out four times in a single baseball game

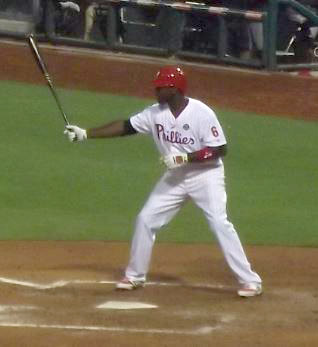
Ryan Howard had four strikeouts in a game a total of 27 times during his major league career.

In baseball, a golden sombrero is when a batter strikes out four times in a game.

== Etymology ==
The term derives from "hat trick," and since four is bigger than three, the rationale was that a four-strikeout performance should be represented by a bigger hat, such as a sombrero.

From the late 1970s to late 1980s, the exact definition was in flux. A (non-golden) "sombrero" was in use to describe a four-strikeout game at least as early as 1977, and "golden sombrero" was defined as five strikeouts in a 1979 article about slang used by the minor league Jackson Mets. In Keith Hernandez's 1987 memoir If at First..., he defined a "hat trick" as three strikeouts, "sombrero" as four strikeouts, and "golden sombrero" as five strikeouts.

In modern usage, a "golden sombrero" is four strikeouts, and a "platinum sombrero" (also known as the "Olympic rings," a term coined by Baltimore Orioles pitcher Bill Scherrer) is five strikeouts.

A "horn" refers to a player striking out six times in a game; the term was coined by pitcher Mike Flanagan after teammate Sam Horn of the Baltimore Orioles accomplished the feat in an extra-inning game in 1991. Alternate names for this accomplishment are "titanium sombrero" or "double platinum sombrero." Flanagan quipped that a hypothetical seven-strikeout game would be called a "horn-a-plenty."

== Major League Baseball ==
=== Notable recent four-strikeout games ===
On August 4, 2009, Tampa Bay Rays third baseman Evan Longoria went 2-for-6, recording a golden sombrero and two home runs. The second home run was a walk off home run. This feat was also accomplished by Brandon Moss of the Oakland Athletics on April 30, 2013 in a 19-inning game against the Los Angeles Angels.

On May 29, 2015, San Diego Padres catcher Derek Norris struck out swinging in his first four plate appearances, then hit a walk-off grand slam, becoming the first MLB player in the modern era to achieve a golden sombrero and a walk-off grand slam in the same game.

On July 30, 2016, New York Yankees player Alex Rodriguez became the first MLB player to earn a golden sombrero after the age of 40 while having earned one before the age of 20.

On October 11, 2017, Chicago Cubs third baseman Kris Bryant (0-for-4) and New York Yankees right fielder Aaron Judge (0-for-5) each recorded golden sombreros. Judge's sombrero was his third in the ALDS; he became the only player since 1903 to have three four-strikeout games in the same postseason. Prior to the start of the 2017 World Series, golden sombreros in the 2017 postseason had already tied the record set in 1997. An increase in the use of starting pitchers as relievers has been suggested as a cause.

On October 22, 2023, Texas Rangers outfielder Adolis García became the first player to strike out four times and hit a grand slam in a postseason game. Garcia's sombrero came against the Houston Astros in Game 6 of the 2023 ALCS.

On April 16, 2025, the Atlanta Braves notably achieved two golden sombreros in the same game, as the first two batters in their lineup, Michael Harris II and Austin Riley, both achieved the mark against the Toronto Blue Jays. They became the first top-2 hitters in MLB history to go a combined 0 for 8 with 8 strikeouts.

In the first game of the 2026 season on March 25, the New York Yankees' Aaron Judge became the first reigning league MVP to record a golden sombrero in a season opener, doing so in the Yankees' 7–0 win over the San Francisco Giants.

==== Major league players with the most four-strikeout games ====
Player	Games	MLB teams
Giancarlo Stanton^{‡}	30	Miami Marlins, New York Yankees
Ryan Howard	27	Philadelphia Phillies
Chris Davis	26	Texas Rangers, Baltimore Orioles
Eugenio Suárez^{‡}	24	Detroit Tigers, Cincinnati Reds, Seattle Mariners, Arizona Diamondbacks
Reggie Jackson^{†}	23	Oakland Athletics, New York Yankees, California Angels, Baltimore Orioles
Jim Thome^{†}	20	Cleveland Indians, Philadelphia Phillies, Chicago White Sox, Minnesota Twins
Adam Dunn	19	Chicago White Sox, Cincinnati Reds, Washington Nationals, Arizona Diamondbacks
Bo Jackson	19	Kansas City Royals, Chicago White Sox
Miguel Sanó^{‡}	18	Minnesota Twins, Los Angeles Angels
Mark Reynolds	18	Arizona Diamondbacks, Baltimore Orioles, Milwaukee Brewers, St. Louis Cardinals, Colorado Rockies
Rob Deer	17	Milwaukee Brewers, Detroit Tigers
Joey Gallo^{‡}	18	Texas Rangers, New York Yankees, Los Angeles Dodgers, Minnesota Twins, Washington Nationals
Sammy Sosa	17	Chicago White Sox, Baltimore Orioles, Chicago Cubs, Texas Rangers
Javier Báez^{‡}	16	Chicago Cubs, New York Mets, Detroit Tigers
Jose Canseco	16	Oakland Athletics, Texas Rangers, Boston Red Sox, Toronto Blue Jays, Tampa Bay Devil Rays, New York Yankees, Chicago White Sox

Key
†	Member of the Baseball Hall of Fame
‡	Denotes player who is active

=== Notable five-strikeout games ===
Sammy Sosa, Ray Lankford, Javier Baez, and Aaron Judge are the only players to earn a platinum sombrero more than twice.

On March 31, 1996, Ron Karkovice became the first player to earn a platinum sombrero on Opening Day. On March 30, 2023, Max Muncy of the Los Angeles Dodgers recorded five strikeouts in an opening day game against the Arizona Diamondbacks. On March 27, 2025, Jackson Chourio of the Milwaukee Brewers struck out five times against the Yankees on opening day.

On July 25, 2017, Chicago Cubs infielder Javier Baez went 0-for-5, recording a platinum sombrero. On the same day, Seattle Mariners designated hitter Nelson Cruz went 0-for-6 with five strikeouts, also recording a platinum sombrero. This marked the first time in major league history in which two players from two different games achieved platinum sombreros on the same day.

On April 3, 2018, Giancarlo Stanton recorded a platinum sombrero in his home debut for the New York Yankees. Stanton was booed as he left the field after his fifth strikeout. Five days later, he became the first player to record two platinum sombreros in one season when he went 0-for-7 and struck out to end the game with two runners on and the Yankees down by one run. Stanton later recorded a golden sombrero in Game 1 of the 2018 American League Division Series, his second career playoff game.

On June 22, 2016, Washington Nationals outfielder Michael A. Taylor recorded a platinum sombrero in a game against the Los Angeles Dodgers. In a performance one sportswriter suggested might be "the worst game in baseball history", Taylor went 0-for-5 with five strikeouts while leaving five men on base, and committed an error in the ninth inning that lost his team the game.

On June 4, 2018, New York Yankees outfielder Aaron Judge earned a platinum sombrero and struck out a total of eight times over the course of a doubleheader against the Detroit Tigers, setting an MLB record.

On May 26, 2019, Colorado Rockies shortstop Trevor Story recorded a platinum sombrero in a nine-inning game against the Baltimore Orioles. The next day, Chicago Cubs shortstop Javier Báez also recorded a platinum sombrero against the Houston Astros, his second.

On June 18, 2019, Boston Red Sox designated hitter J.D. Martinez and Minnesota Twins third baseman Miguel Sanó recorded platinum sombreros in a seventeen-inning game.

On September 30, 2020, St. Louis Cardinals outfielder Harrison Bader earned his platinum sombrero in Game 1 of the National League Wild Card Series against the San Diego Padres, joining George Pipgras of the 1932 New York Yankees and Reggie Sanders of the 1995 Cincinnati Reds as the only players in MLB history to accomplish this feat in the playoffs. Bader finished 0-for-5 with six men left on base, though his Cardinals won 7–4.

On October 8, 2022, Andrés Giménez of the Cleveland Guardians and Jose Siri of the Tampa Bay Rays, in a 15-inning playoff game, each had five strikeouts. This is the only known playoff game in which two players earned platinum sombreros. Giménez finished 0-for-5 and was on deck when Oscar González hit a walkoff home run.

On April 1, 2023, Baltimore Orioles second baseman Ramón Urías recorded a platinum sombrero against the Boston Red Sox on exclusively swinging strikeouts, three times against starting pitcher Chris Sale, a fourth against reliever Josh Winckowski, and the fifth against reliever Chris Martin.

On July 30, 2023, New York Yankees first baseman Anthony Rizzo earned his first platinum sombrero in a 9–3 loss to the Baltimore Orioles in which Yankees batters struck out 18 times. This was one of the lowest points of a slump reaching back to May 29. During this stretch, Rizzo batted .168/.272/.224 with only one home run and nine RBIs over 44 games.

In August 2024, the Seattle Mariners had a pair of platinum sombreros occur in the same week. First, on August 11, outfielder Julio Rodríguez earned a platinum sombrero in a 12–1 victory over the New York Mets. This was Rodríguez's first game back in the lineup after suffering a right ankle sprain. Then, on August 17, outfielder Randy Arozarena recorded a platinum sombrero in a 7–2 loss to the Pittsburgh Pirates.

=== Major league players with six strikeouts in a game ===
Only eight players have had six strikeouts in one game, as listed in the following table. All eight instances occurred in games that were completed in extra innings; the record for strikeouts in a nine-inning game is five.

Player	Date	Innings	Team	Box score
Carl Weilman	July 25, 1913	15	St. Louis Browns	
Don Hoak	May 2, 1956	17	Chicago Cubs	
Rick Reichardt	May 31, 1966	17	California Angels	
Billy Cowan	July 9, 1971	20	California Angels	
Cecil Cooper	June 14, 1974	15	Boston Red Sox	
Sam Horn	July 17, 1991	15	Baltimore Orioles	
Alex Gonzalez	September 9, 1998	13	Toronto Blue Jays	
Geoff Jenkins	June 8, 2004	17	Milwaukee Brewers	

== Minor League Baseball ==
The professional baseball record for strikeouts in a single game belongs to Khalil Lee, who as a member of the minor league Lexington Legends, Class A affiliate of the Kansas City Royals, struck out eight times in a 21-inning game in 2017.

== College baseball ==
University of Texas catcher Cameron Rupp struck out six times in the Longhorns' record-setting 25-inning game against Boston College on May 30, 2009.
