= Iván Cruz =

Puerto Rican baseball player (born 1968)

- First baseman
- Born: May 3, 1968 (age 57); Fajardo, Puerto Rico
- Batted: Left Threw: Left

Professional debut
- MLB: July 18, 1997, for the New York Yankees
- NPB: March 30, 2001, for the Hanshin Tigers

Last appearance
- MLB: September 27, 2002, for the St. Louis Cardinals
- NPB: August 30, 2003, for the Chunichi Dragons

MLB statistics
- Batting average: .273
- Home runs: 2
- Runs batted in: 8

NPB statistics
- Batting average: .228
- Home runs: 25
- Runs batted in: 68
- Stats at Baseball Reference

Teams
- New York Yankees (1997); Pittsburgh Pirates (1999–2000); Hanshin Tigers (2001); St. Louis Cardinals (2002); Chunichi Dragons (2003)

Luis Iván Cruz (born May 3, 1968) is a Puerto Rican former professional baseball first baseman and past coach for the GCL Braves in 2018.

== Career ==
He played during four seasons at the major league level for the New York Yankees, Pittsburgh Pirates, and St. Louis Cardinals.

He was drafted by the Detroit Tigers in the 28th round of the 1989 amateur draft. Cruz played his first professional season with their Class-A (Short Season) Niagara Falls Rapids in 1989, and his last with the Chunichi Dragons of Japan's Central League in 2003.

He played his last affiliated season with St. Louis and their Triple-A Memphis Redbirds in 2002, in which he won the Joe Bauman Home Run Award.

In 2008, he entered his first of two seasons as manager of the U.S. Military All-Stars/Heroes of the Diamond and the Latin Stars "Red, White and Blue Tour" posting consecutive winning seasons. Under Cruz’s tutelage, over 25 players were offered scholarships or professional contracts.

In 2010, he made his affiliated debut as the manager of the Peoria Padres, the Rookie Short Season A-ball affiliate of the San Diego Padres. Cruz was named as a coach for the GCL Braves in the Atlanta Braves organization for the 2018 season.

== See also ==
- List of Major League Baseball players from Puerto Rico
