= Babe Ruth Home Run Award =

- Awarded for: Home run leader in Major League Baseball
- Presented by: Sullivan Artworks

History
- First award: 1998
- Final award: 2009

The Babe Ruth Home Run Award (Note: Some sources refer to it as the Babe Ruth Award, not to be confused with the Major League Baseball postseason award also named the Babe Ruth Award.) was an annual award presented to the previous season's leading home run hitter in Major League Baseball (MLB). The award was named after the legendary Babe Ruth, who led the American League in homers 12 times. It was first awarded to Mark McGwire after his record-setting 1998 season. The award was a 21-pound (9.5 kg), 20-inch-high (51 cm) bronze statue of Ruth based on a 1920 photo of him following through on a tremendous swing.

The Babe Ruth Home Run Award was developed by brothers Jim and Brian Sullivan. Jim was the sculptor, while Brian focused on the marketing of the award. The Sullivans originally wanted to create a life-size statue of Ruth as a tourist attraction similar to the Michael Jordan statue. Unable to secure a sponsor, they created the award to honor Ruth. The trophy was estimated to cost around $4,000 as of 2006, and it was funded by the Sullivans and given on behalf of their company, Sullivan Artworks based in Weymouth, Massachusetts. MLB was not interested in sponsoring the award; the American League already honored its home run champion with a nameless award, and the National League offered the Mel Ott Award. Both the awards received little publicity. The Babe Ruth Home Run Award was usually presented to the recipient by Ruth's daughter Julia Ruth Stevens or her son, Tom Stevens.

== Key ==
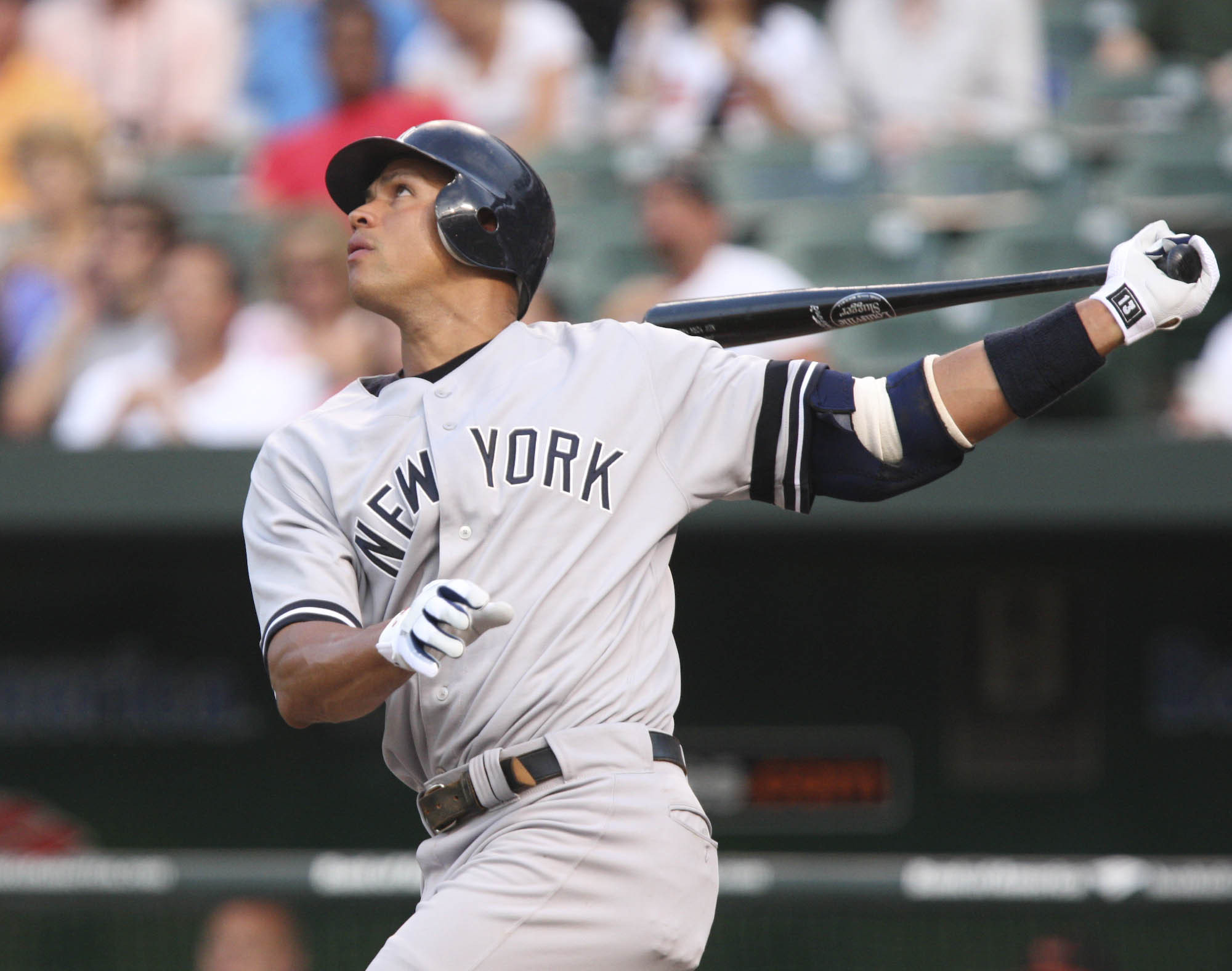
Alex Rodriguez won the most Babe Ruth Home Run Awards with three.

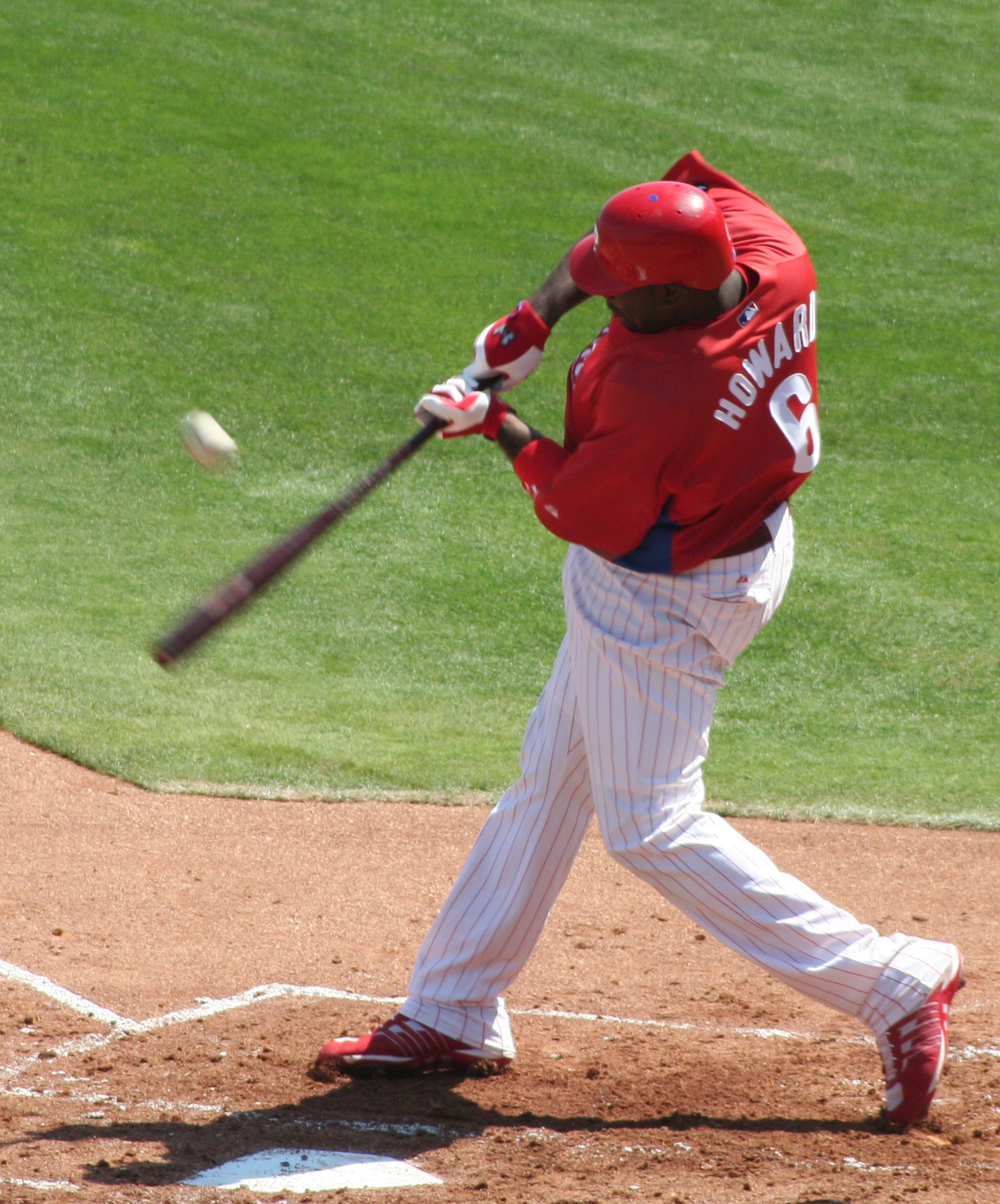
The only other multiple-time winner is Ryan Howard.

Year	Year the award was earned. The award is presented the following season.
Player (#)	Name of winner (# times won if repeat winner)
Team	The player's team when he won the award
HR	Number of home runs
^	Indicates multiple award winners in the same year

== List of winners ==
Year	Player	Team	HR	Ref
1998	Mark McGwire	St. Louis Cardinals	70	
1999	Not awarded due to lack of sponsor			
2000	Sammy Sosa	Chicago Cubs	50	
2001	Barry Bonds	San Francisco Giants	73	
2002	Alex Rodriguez	Texas Rangers	57	
2003^	Alex Rodriguez (2)	Texas Rangers	47	
2003^	Jim Thome	Philadelphia Phillies	47	
2004	Adrian Beltre	Los Angeles Dodgers	48	
2005	Andruw Jones	Atlanta Braves	51	
2006	Ryan Howard	Philadelphia Phillies	58	
2007	Alex Rodriguez (3)	New York Yankees	54	
2008	Ryan Howard (2)	Philadelphia Phillies	48	
2009	Albert Pujols	St. Louis Cardinals	47	

== See also ==
- List of Major League Baseball annual home run leaders
- Baseball awards § U.S. major leagues: Awards by organizations other than MLB
- Josh Gibson Legacy Award, major league home run award from the Negro Leagues Baseball Museum
- Joe Bauman Home Run Award, minor league baseball home run award
