= At bats per home run =

Baseball statistic

In baseball statistics, at bats per home run (AB/HR) is a way to measure how frequently a batter hits a home run. It is determined by dividing the number of at bats by the number of home runs hit. Mark McGwire possesses the MLB record for this statistic with a career ratio of 10.61 at bats per home run. Aaron Judge is second with a ratio of 11.15 and has the best career ratio among active players, as of the end of the 2025 season.

== Major League Baseball leaders ==
=== Career ===
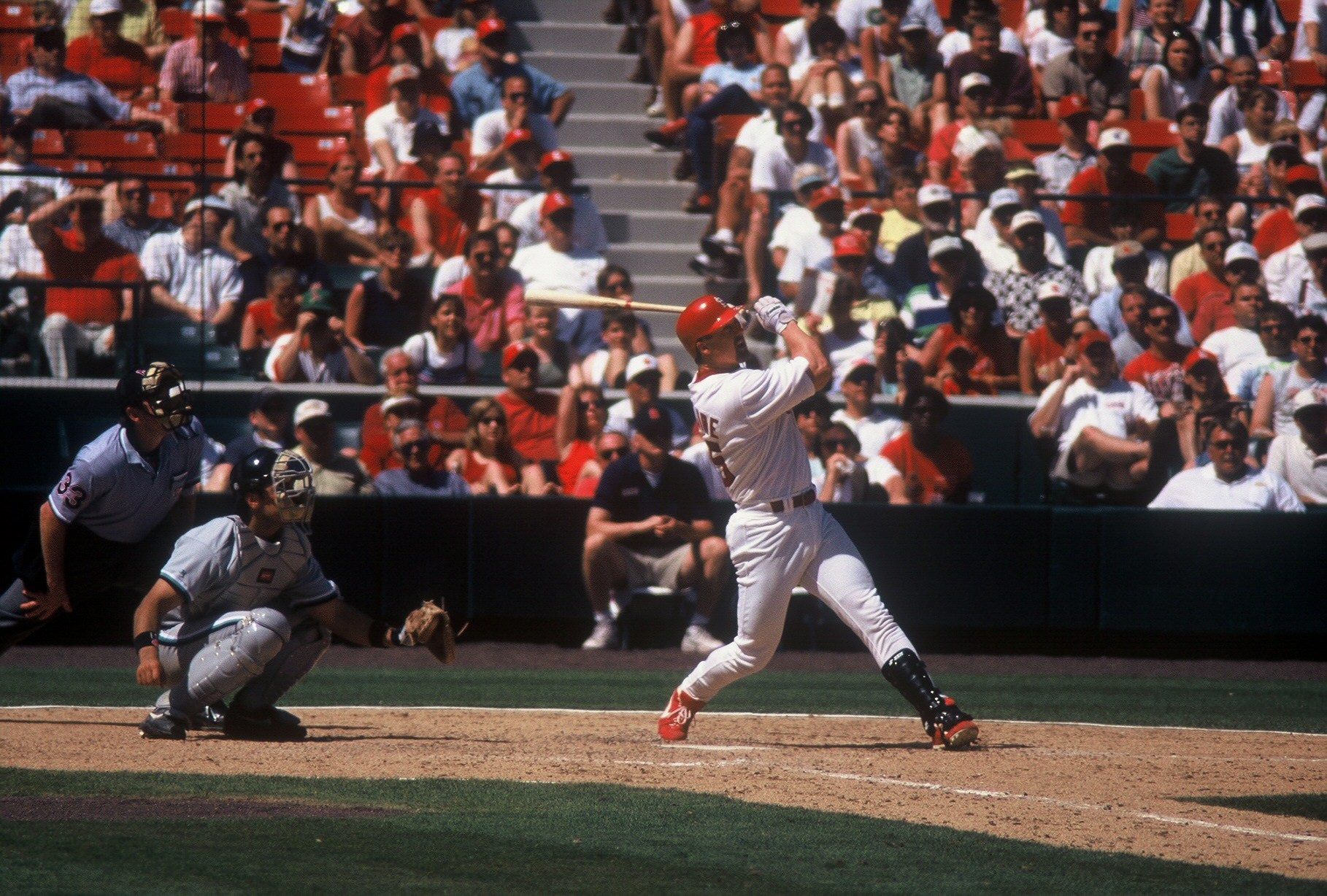
Mark McGwire holds the career record for fewest at bats per home run with at least 3,000 plate appearances, at 10.61.

Totals are current as of the end of the 2025 season, minimum 3,000 plate appearances.

1. Mark McGwire - 10.61
2. Aaron Judge - 11.15
3. Babe Ruth - 11.76
4. Barry Bonds - 12.92
5. Shohei Ohtani - 13.32

=== Season ===
Single-season statistics are current as of the end of the 2025 season.

1. Barry Bonds - 6.52 (2001)
2. Mark McGwire - 7.27 (1998)
3. Josh Gibson - 7.80 (1937)
4. Mark McGwire - 8.02 (1999)
5. Mark McGwire - 8.13 (1996)

Babe Ruth was the first batter to average fewer than nine at-bats per home run over a season, hitting his 54 home runs of the 1920 season in 457 at-bats; an average of 8.463. Josh Gibson, playing for the Homestead Grays in 1937, hit 20 home runs in 156 at bats in 39 recognized games in the Negro National League. In 1998, Mark McGwire became the first batter in MLB to average fewer than eight AB/HR, hitting his 70 home runs in 509 at-bats (an average of 7.27). In 2001, Barry Bonds became the first batter to average fewer than seven AB/HR, setting the major league record by hitting his 73 home runs of the 2001 season in 476 at-bats for an average of 6.52.

Ruth led the American League every year from 1918 until 1931, except for 1925.

Ruth, McGwire, and Bonds are the only batters in MLB history to average nine or fewer AB/HR over a season, having done so a combined ten times. Gibson's 1937 season ranks as the best in the Negro Leagues:

Nine or fewer at-bats per home run
Batter	Season	HR	AB	AB/HR
Babe Ruth	1920	54	457	8.4629
Babe Ruth	1927	60	540	9.00
Josh Gibson	1937	20	156	7.80
Mark McGwire	1996	52	423	8.1346
Mark McGwire	1998	70	509	7.2714
Mark McGwire	1999	65	521	8.0154
Barry Bonds	2001	73	476	6.5205
Barry Bonds	2002	46	403	8.7608
Barry Bonds	2003	45	390	8.6667
Barry Bonds	2004	45	373	8.2889

Aaron Judge's 62 home run season in 2022 came at a rate of 9.19 AB/HR.

Conversely, among MLB players who have hit a home run, Duane Kuiper has the lowest AB/HR rate, hitting one home run in 3,379 at bats.
