= List of Major League Baseball career extra base hits leaders =

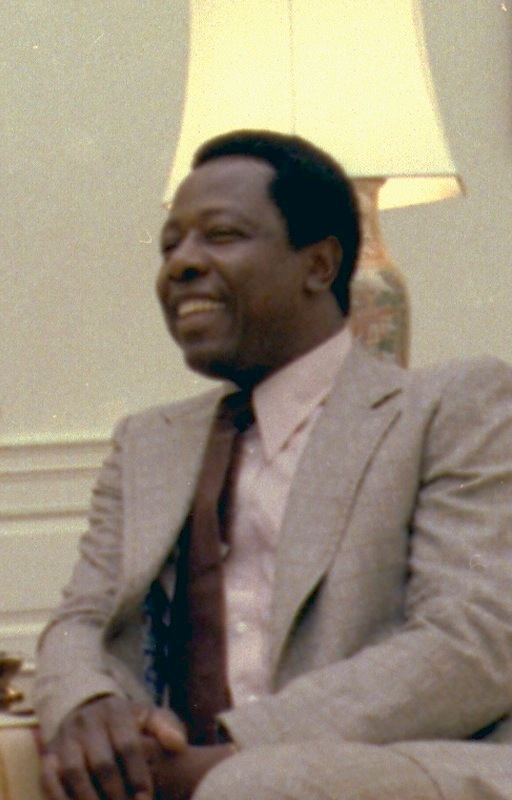
Hank Aaron, the all-time leader in extra-base hits.

In baseball, an extra base hit (EB, EBH or XBH), also known as a long hit, is any base hit on which the batter can advance past first base without the benefit of a fielder either committing an error or opting to make a throw to retire another base runner (see fielder's choice). Extra base hits are often not listed separately in tables of baseball statistics, but are easily determined by calculating the total of a batter's doubles, triples, and home runs.

Hank Aaron is the all-time leader with 1,477 career extra base hits. Barry Bonds (1,440) and Albert Pujols (1,405) are the other players with more than 1,400 career extra base hits. Only 39 players all-time have reached 1,000 career extra-base hits.

== Key ==
**Rank**	Rank amongst leaders in extra-base hits. A blank field indicates a tie.
**Player (2026 XBHs)**	Number of extra-base hits during the 2026 Major League Baseball season.
**XBH**	Total career extra base hits.
*	Denotes elected to National Baseball Hall of Fame.
**Bold**	Denotes active player. (Note: A player is considered inactive if he has announced his retirement or has not played for a full season.)

== List ==
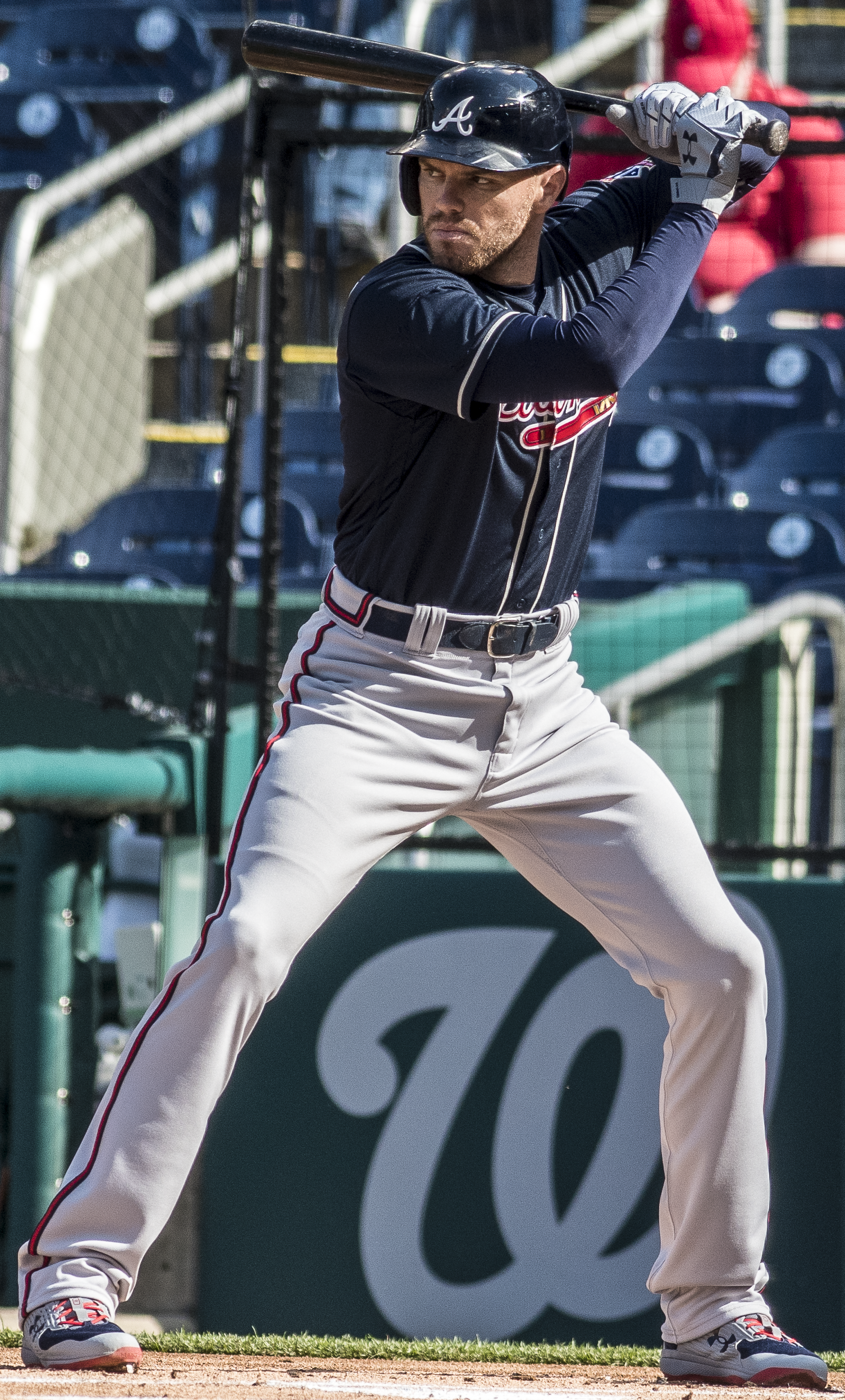
Freddie Freeman, the active leader in extra base hits and tied for 41st all-time.

- Stats updated as of September 27, 2026.

Rank	Player (2026 XBHs)	XBH
1	Hank Aaron*	1,477
2	Barry Bonds	1,440
3	Albert Pujols	1,405
4	Stan Musial*	1,377
5	Babe Ruth*	1,356
6	Willie Mays*	1,323
7	Alex Rodriguez	1,275
8	Ken Griffey Jr.*	1,192
	David Ortiz*	1,192
	Rafael Palmeiro	1,192
11	Lou Gehrig*	1,190
12	Frank Robinson*	1,186
13	Carl Yastrzemski*	1,157
14	Miguel Cabrera	1,155
15	Adrián Beltré*	1,151
16	Ty Cobb*	1,136
17	Tris Speaker*	1,131
18	Manny Ramirez	1,122
19	George Brett*	1,119
20	Jimmie Foxx*	1,117
	Ted Williams*	1,117
22	Eddie Murray*	1,099
23	Dave Winfield*	1,093
24	Jim Thome*	1,089
25	Carlos Beltrán*	1,078
	Cal Ripken Jr.*	1,078
27	Reggie Jackson*	1,075
28	Mel Ott*	1,071
29	Chipper Jones*	1,055
30	Pete Rose	1,041
31	Andre Dawson*	1,039
32	Sammy Sosa	1,033
33	Frank Thomas*	1,028
34	Luis Gonzalez	1,018
35	Mike Schmidt*	1,015
36	Craig Biggio*	1,014
37	Rogers Hornsby*	1,011
38	Ernie Banks*	1,009
39	Gary Sheffield	1,003
40	Todd Helton*	998
41	**Freddie Freeman (49)**	996
	Honus Wagner*	996
43	Al Simmons*	995
44	Jeff Kent*	984
45	Carlos Delgado	974
46	Vladimir Guerrero*	972
	Al Kaline*	972
48	Jeff Bagwell*	969
49	Tony Pérez*	963
50	Robin Yount*	960

Rank	Player (2026 XBHs)	XBH
51	Fred McGriff*	958
52	Paul Molitor*	953
	Willie Stargell*	953
54	Mickey Mantle*	952
55	Billy Williams*	948
56	Dwight Evans	941
57	Robinson Canó	940
	Dave Parker*	940
59	Eddie Mathews*	938
60	Iván Rodríguez*	934
61	Alfonso Soriano	924
62	Bobby Abreu	921
	Harold Baines*	921
	Goose Goslin*	921
65	Willie McCovey*	920
66	Larry Walker*	916
67	Paul Waner*	909
68	**Paul Goldschmidt (32)**	905
	Aramis Ramírez	905
70	Charlie Gehringer*	904
71	Nap Lajoie*	902
72	Torii Hunter	890
73	Harmon Killebrew*	887
74	Joe Carter	881
	Joe DiMaggio*	881
76	Steve Finley	877
77	Harry Heilmann*	876
	Scott Rolen*	876
79	Andrés Galarraga	875
80	Rickey Henderson*	873
81	Derek Jeter*	870
82	Vada Pinson	868
83	Johnny Damon	866
84	Sam Crawford*	864
85	Joe Medwick*	858
86	Paul Konerko	857
	Jimmy Rollins	857
88	Jim Edmonds	855
89	Jason Giambi	854
90	Andruw Jones*	853
91	**Bryce Harper (64)**	852
92	Nelson Cruz	851
93	Duke Snider*	850
94	**Nolan Arenado (56)**	848
95	Juan Gonzalez	847
96	Roberto Clemente*	846
	Carlos Lee	846
98	Garret Anderson	845
99	Carlton Fisk*	844
100	Gary Gaetti	842
