= List of Major League Baseball career plate appearance leaders =

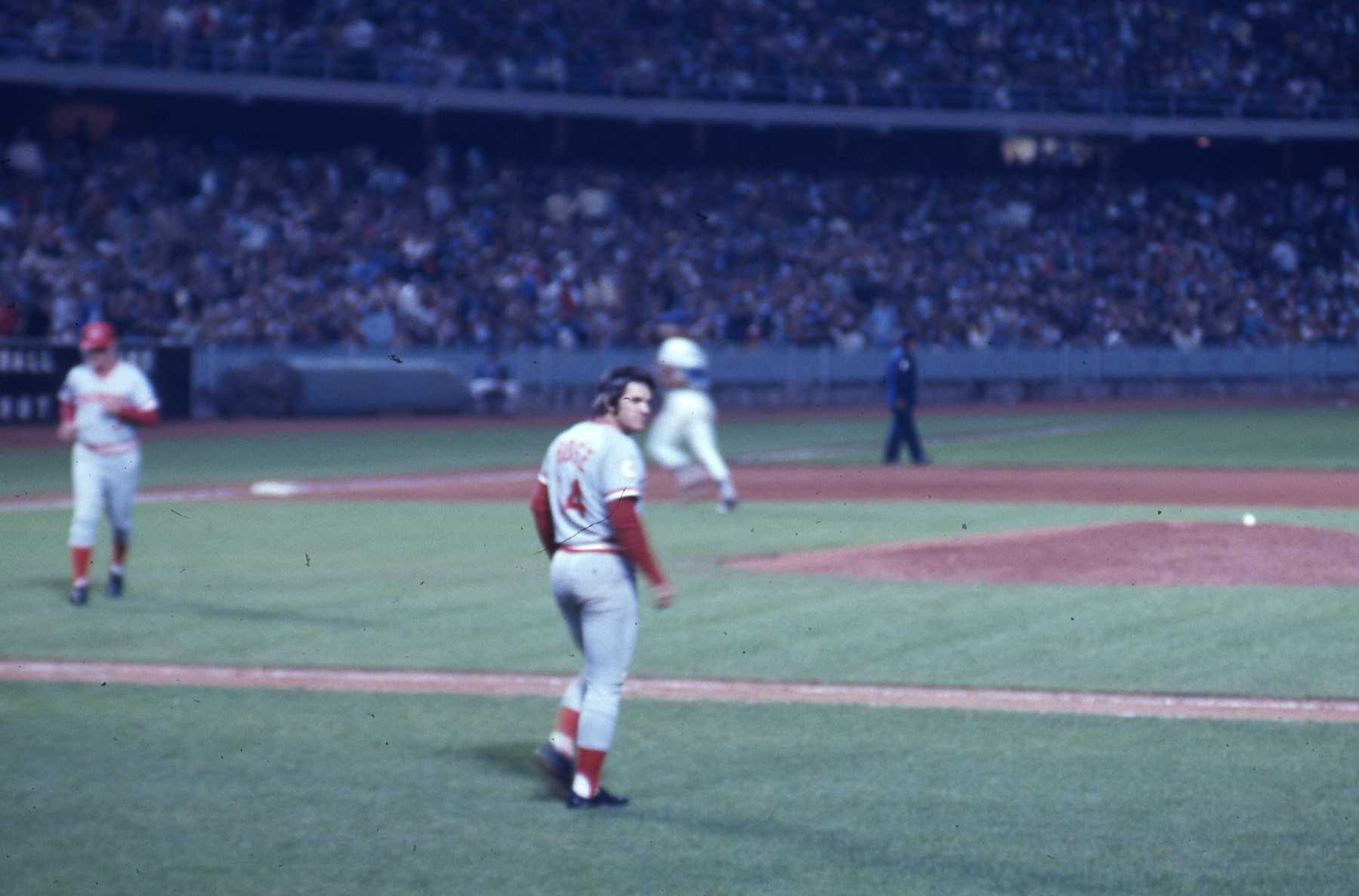
Pete Rose, the all-time leader in career plate appearances.

In baseball statistics, a player is credited with a plate appearance (denoted by PA) each time he completes a turn batting. A player completes a turn batting when: he strikes out or is declared out before reaching first base; or he reaches first base safely or is awarded first base (by a base on balls, hit by pitch, or catcher's interference); or he hits a fair ball which causes a preceding runner to be put out for the third out before he himself is put out or reaches first base safely (see also left on base, fielder's choice, force play). In other words, a plate appearance ends when the batter is put out, the inning ends, or he becomes a runner. A related statistic, at bats, counts a subset of plate appearances that end under certain circumstances.

Pete Rose is the all-time leader with 15,890 career plate appearances. Rose is the only player in MLB history to surpass 14,000 and 15,000 career plate appearances. Carl Yastrzemski (13,992), Hank Aaron (13,941), Rickey Henderson (13,346), Ty Cobb (13,103), and Albert Pujols (13,041) are the only other players to surpass 13,000 career plate appearances.

As of September 27, 2026, there is only one active player in the top 100 for career plate appearances. Los Angeles Dodgers first baseman Freddie Freeman is the active leader in career plate appearances and 86th overall with 10,020.

== Key ==
**Rank**	Among leaders in career plate appearances. A blank field indicates a tie.
**Player (2026 PAs)**	Plate appearances in 2026.
**PA**	Career plate appearances.
*	Elected to National Baseball Hall of Fame.
**Bold**	Active player. (Note: A player is considered inactive if he has announced his retirement or has not played for a full season.)

== List ==
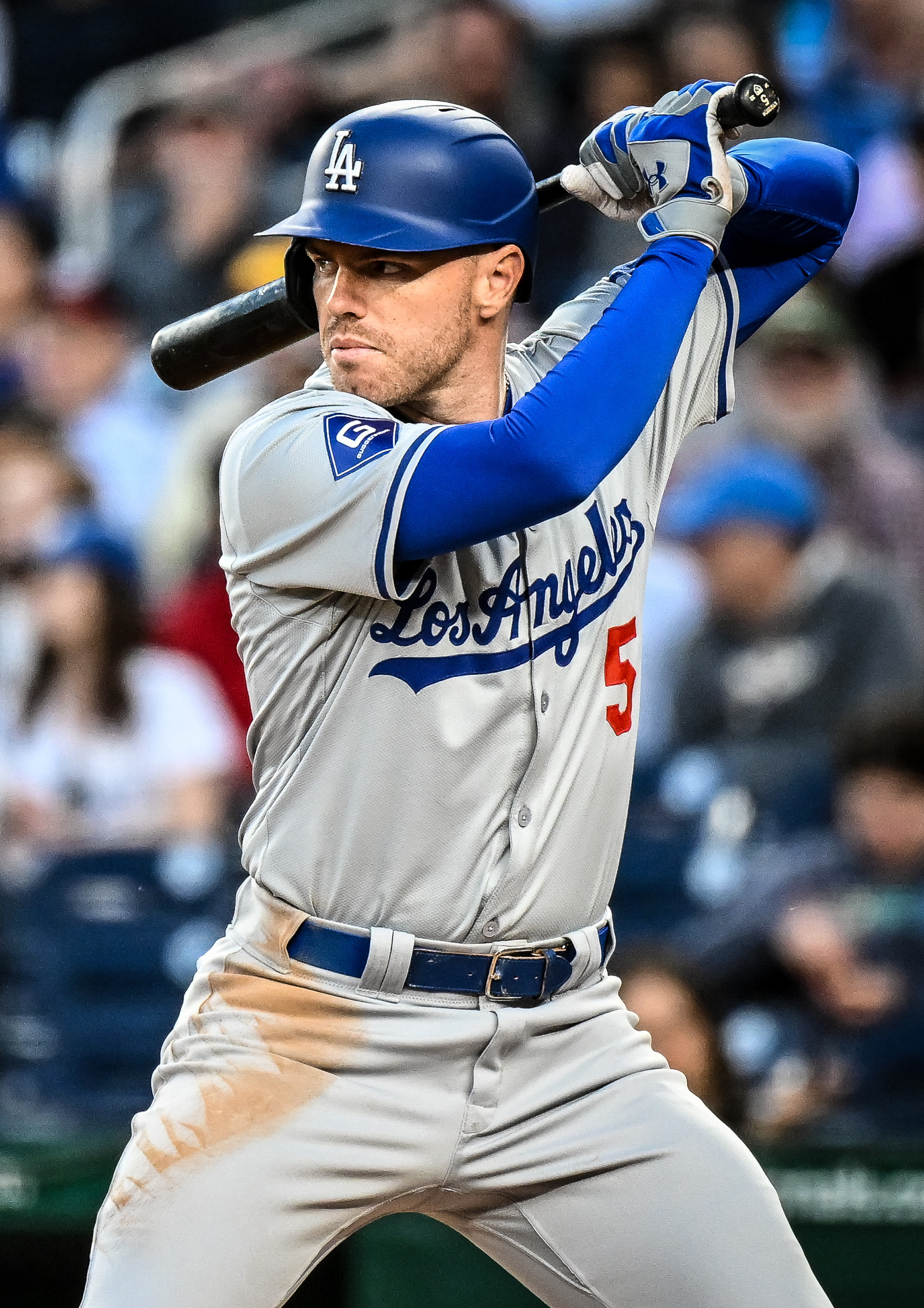
Freddie Freeman, the active leader and 86th all-time in career plate appearances.

- Stats updated of September 27, 2026.

Rank	Player (2026 PAs)	PA
1	Pete Rose	15,890
2	Carl Yastrzemski*	13,992
3	Hank Aaron*	13,941
4	Rickey Henderson*	13,346
5	Ty Cobb*	13,103
6	Albert Pujols	13,041
7	Cal Ripken Jr.*	12,883
8	Eddie Murray*	12,817
9	Stan Musial*	12,721
10	Barry Bonds	12,606
11	Derek Jeter*	12,602
12	Willie Mays*	12,545
13	Craig Biggio*	12,504
14	Dave Winfield*	12,358
15	Robin Yount*	12,249
16	Alex Rodriguez	12,207
17	Paul Molitor*	12,167
18	Adrián Beltré*	12,130
19	Eddie Collins*	12,087
20	Rafael Palmeiro	12,046
21	Tris Speaker*	12,020
22	Omar Vizquel	12,013
23	Miguel Cabrera	11,796
24	Brooks Robinson*	11,782
25	Honus Wagner*	11,756
26	Frank Robinson*	11,744
27	George Brett*	11,625
28	Al Kaline*	11,597
29	Reggie Jackson*	11,418
30	Mel Ott*	11,347
31	Cap Anson*	11,331
32	Joe Morgan*	11,329
33	Ken Griffey Jr.*	11,304
34	Rabbit Maranville*	11,260
35	Lou Brock*	11,240
36	Luis Aparicio*	11,231
37	Rusty Staub	11,229
38	Harold Baines*	11,092
39	Carlos Beltrán*	11,031
40	Gary Sheffield	10,947
41	Johnny Damon	10,917
42	Tony Pérez*	10,861
43	Ozzie Smith*	10,778
44	Max Carey*	10,772
45	Andre Dawson*	10,769
46	Paul Waner*	10,767
47	Wade Boggs*	10,740
48	Darrell Evans	10,737
49	Ichiro Suzuki*	10,734
50	Babe Ruth*	10,626

Rank	Player (2026 PAs)	PA
51	Sam Crawford*	10,625
52	Chipper Jones*	10,614
53	Dwight Evans	10,569
54	Rod Carew*	10,550
55	Luis Gonzalez	10,531
56	Billy Williams*	10,519
57	Jake Beckley*	10,518
58	Nap Lajoie*	10,468
59	Steve Finley	10,460
60	Bill Dahlen	10,429
61	Vada Pinson	10,405
62	Roberto Alomar*	10,400
63	Ernie Banks*	10,396
64	Tim Raines*	10,359
65	Nellie Fox*	10,351
66	Jim Thome*	10,313
67	Harry Hooper*	10,277
68	Iván Rodríguez*	10,270
69	Sam Rice*	10,260
70	Luke Appling*	10,254
71	Charlie Gehringer*	10,245
72	Jimmy Rollins	10,240
73	Tony Gwynn*	10,232
74	Graig Nettles	10,228
75	Roberto Clemente*	10,212
76	George Davis*	10,186
77	Dave Parker*	10,184
78	Fred McGriff*	10,174
79	Frankie Frisch*	10,101
	Eddie Mathews*	10,101
81	David Ortiz*	10,091
82	Bobby Abreu	10,081
83	Frank Thomas*	10,075
84	Mike Schmidt*	10,062
85	Bill Buckner	10,037
86	**Freddie Freeman (657)**	10,020
87	Buddy Bell	10,009
88	Zack Wheat*	10,007
89	Chili Davis	9,997
90	Lou Whitaker	9,967
91	Doc Cramer	9,934
92	Mickey Mantle*	9,910
93	Sammy Sosa	9,896
93	Fred Clarke*	9,871
95	Carlton Fisk*	9,853
96	Mickey Vernon	9,839
97	Harmon Killebrew*	9,833
98	Goose Goslin*	9,830
99	Willie Davis	9,822
100	Gary Gaetti	9,817
