= Carlos Beltrán =

Puerto Rican baseball player (born 1977)

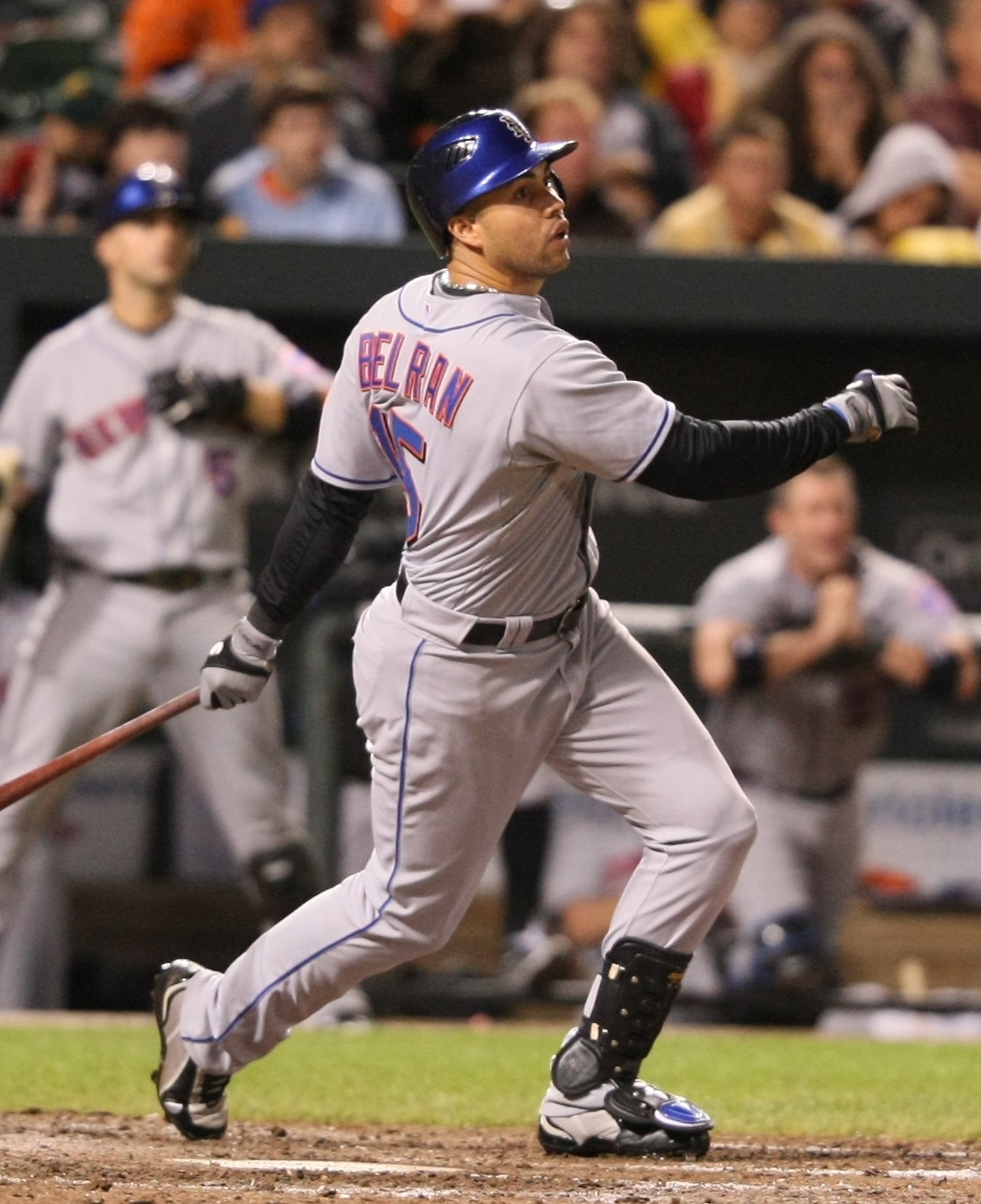
- Beltrán with the New York Mets in 2009
- Outfielder
- Born: April 24, 1977 (age 49); Manatí, Puerto Rico
- Batted: Switch Threw: Right

MLB debut
- September 14, 1998, for the Kansas City Royals

Last MLB appearance
- October 1, 2017, for the Houston Astros

MLB statistics
- Batting average: .279
- Hits: 2,725
- Home runs: 435
- Runs batted in: 1,587
- Stats at Baseball Reference

Teams
- Kansas City Royals (1998–2004); Houston Astros (2004); New York Mets (2005–2011); San Francisco Giants (2011); St. Louis Cardinals (2012–2013); New York Yankees (2014–2016); Texas Rangers (2016); Houston Astros (2017)

Career highlights and awards
- 9× All-Star (2004–2007, 2009, 2011–2013, 2016); World Series champion (2017); AL Rookie of the Year (1999); 3× Gold Glove Award (2006–2008); 2× Silver Slugger Award (2006, 2007); Roberto Clemente Award (2013); New York Mets No. 15 retired; New York Mets Hall of Fame

Member of the National

Baseball Hall of Fame
- Induction: 2026
- Vote: 84.2% (fourth ballot)
Medals
Men's baseball
Representing Puerto Rico
World Baseball Classic
Silver medal – second place	2013 San Francisco	National team
Silver medal – second place	2017 Los Angeles	National team

Carlos Iván Beltrán Valdés (Spanish pronunciation: [ˈkaɾlos βelˈtɾan]; born April 24, 1977) is a Puerto Rican former outfielder in Major League Baseball (MLB) who played for seven teams from 1998 to 2017. A nine-time All-Star, he hit 20 home runs twelve times and 30 doubles eleven times, with eight seasons of 100 runs batted in (RBI) and seven seasons of 100 runs scored. He was named the American League (AL) Rookie of the Year in 1999 with the Kansas City Royals after batting .293 with 112 runs and 108 RBI, and leading the league's center fielders in putouts and assists. He led the Royals in runs, RBI, triples and stolen bases every year from 2001 to 2003, always with over 20 home runs and twice batting over .300. In June 2004, he was traded to the Houston Astros in the National League (NL), and became the first player in major league history to hit 30 home runs and steal 30 bases after changing leagues midseason. After joining the New York Mets as a free agent, he led the team to a tie for the best record in the major leagues in 2006, posting career highs in home runs (41), runs (127), RBI (116), walks (95), and slugging percentage (.594).

Beltrán won three Gold Glove Awards for his defense, leading AL center fielders in assists three times and NL center fielders once, and leading both leagues in putouts and double plays once each. His totals of 1,334 games, 3,538 putouts, 88 assists and 25 double plays in center field in the 2000s led all major leaguers, with his 108 career assists in center field ranking eighth among players since 1960, and his 28 double plays tied for ninth. With 312 career steals in 361 attempts, Beltrán has the highest stolen base percentage (86.4%) of any major league player with 300 or more career attempts, and he became the fifth player to hit 400 home runs and steal 300 bases. His 273 home runs as a center fielder ranked ninth in major league history when he retired, and his 123 home runs and 516 RBI with the Royals remain team records for a switch hitter. He ended his career with 565 doubles and 1,078 extra base hits, both the second highest totals in major league history for a switch hitter, and also ranked third in RBI (1,587), fourth in home runs (435), total bases (4,751) and at bats (9,768), and sixth in hits (2,725) and slugging percentage (.486).

Beltrán was an outstanding player in the postseason, batting .307 with 16 home runs in 65 games and hitting .400 in four different series. He scored 21 runs in 12 games during the 2004 playoffs to set a record for most runs scored in one postseason, despite falling short of the World Series (Jose Altuve tied the record in 16 games in 2021), and 13 years later returned to the Astros for his final season, helping the team win the World Series for his first championship. Beltrán was hired as the manager of the Mets for the 2020 season, but stepped down without managing a game after the Astros sign stealing scandal broke in late 2019. While Beltrán was the only player to be named in the investigation report, the extent of his involvement in the scheme has been disputed.

Beltrán was a member of the Puerto Rico national team that won silver medals in the 2013 and 2017 World Baseball Classics, was named to the all-tournament team in 2017, and served as the general manager for Puerto Rico in the 2026 World Baseball Classic. He was briefly an analyst for YES Network, and has been a member of the Mets front office since 2023. In 2026, Beltrán was inducted into the National Baseball Hall of Fame and had his number 15 retired by the Mets that same year.

== Early life ==
Carlos Iván Beltrán Valdés was born on April 24, 1977, in Manatí, Puerto Rico. In his youth, Beltrán excelled in many sports, with volleyball and baseball being his favorites. At his father's urging, he gave up volleyball to concentrate on baseball when he was seventeen. He was originally a shortstop before moving to the outfield. He graduated from Fernando Callejo High School in 1995.

== Professional career ==
=== Draft and minor leagues ===
The Kansas City Royals selected Beltrán in the second round of the 1995 Major League Baseball draft. After he signed, the Royals assigned him to the Gulf Coast Royals of the Rookie-level Gulf Coast League. Originally only hitting right-handed, he batted .276 with no home runs. During the off-season, Beltrán taught himself to hit left-handed, with advice from New York Yankees outfielder Bernie Williams and Royals minor league coach Kevin Long. In 1996, he played for the Spokane Indians of the Class A-Short Season Northwest League, and the Lansing Lugnuts of the Class A Midwest League. In 1997 he spent the entire season playing for the Wilmington Blue Rocks of the Class A-Advanced Carolina League. He began the 1998 season with Wilmington and received a promotion to the Wichita Wranglers of the Class AA Texas League.

=== Kansas City Royals (1998–2004) ===
==== 1998–99 ====
Beltrán made his major league debut as a September call-up in a 16-6 win over the Oakland Athletics on September 14, 1998, getting a single in his first plate appearance. Unlike many players, he never played in Triple-A. In 14 games in 1998, Beltrán got 16 hits, 5 doubles, 3 triples, 7 RBIs and 3 stolen bases with a .276 batting average during his time in the majors.

By 1999, he won the job as the Royals' starting center fielder and leadoff hitter. He hit his first home run in the second inning of the season opener on April 10, a 9-4 road win over the Chicago White Sox. He displayed significant power by midsummer and was moved to the #3 slot in the batting order after the All-Star break. Beltrán won the American League Rookie of the Year award, batting .293 with 22 home runs, 108 RBI and 27 stolen bases in 156 games, and led the league's center fielders with 395 putouts and 16 assists. On September 27, 1999, Beltrán made the final out at Tiger Stadium, striking out against relief pitcher Todd Jones as the Detroit Tigers beat the Royals 8–2.

==== 2000–2003 ====
Injuries restricted Beltrán to 98 games during the 2000 season and he slumped to .247, losing his center field position to the popular Johnny Damon. After Damon was traded to the Athletics following the season, Beltrán regained his job in 2001 and recaptured his rookie form. He batted .306 with 24 home runs and 101 RBIs that season, followed by lines of .273-29-105 in 2002 and .307-26-100 in 2003, and led the league in assists and double plays in 2001 and in assists in 2002.

==== 2004 ====
In 2003, Beltrán batted only .184 in April. His luck changed in 2004, as Beltrán began the year with eight home runs and 19 RBIs and was selected as American League Player of the Month for April.

In the first 69 games of the 2004 season, Beltrán batted .278 with 15 homers, 51 RBI, and 14 stolen bases. Playing for a small market club and represented by agent Scott Boras, Beltrán endured trade rumors through the 2003 and 2004 seasons. As the end of his contract neared, the two sides failed to negotiate a long-term deal. Following an interleague doubleheader loss to the last-place Montreal Expos, Royals general manager Allard Baird informed reporters that he was preparing to dismantle the team and rebuild it for the 2005 season.

=== Houston Astros (2004) ===
On June 24, 2004, the Royals traded Beltrán to the Houston Astros in a three-team deal, which also sent relief pitcher Octavio Dotel from the Astros to the Athletics, while the Royals picked up Oakland minor leaguers (pitcher Mike Wood and third-baseman Mark Teahen) and Astros catcher John Buck.

While still a Royal, Beltrán had been selected as an AL starting outfielder for the All-Star Game. After being traded to the Astros, Beltrán was ruled ineligible for the AL roster and was not listed on the NL roster. However, after NL starter Ken Griffey Jr. went on the disabled list, Beltrán was named his substitute.

For the rest of the 2004 season with the Astros, Beltrán played 90 games, batting .258 with 23 home runs, 53 RBI, and 28 stolen bases. Overall in 2004 with both teams, Beltrán played 159 games with a .267 batting average, 38 home runs, 42 stolen bases, 104 RBI, and 121 runs scored.

In the 2004 playoffs, Beltrán tied Barry Bonds' single postseason record with eight home runs. He hit one in each of the first four games of the National League Championship Series (NLCS) against the St. Louis Cardinals, including the game-winner in Game 4. He hit two home runs in Game 5 of the previous playoff round in the National League Division Series (NLDS) against the Atlanta Braves; it was the first time Beltran or the Astros had won a postseason series, and his performance was the first time that an Astro had hit two home runs in a postseason game. In total, Beltrán clubbed at least one home run in a record-setting five consecutive postseason games, since exceeded only by Daniel Murphy's home runs in six consecutive postseason games in 2015. In 12 games in the 2004 playoffs, Beltrán batted .435 with 14 RBIs and 21 runs scored.

=== New York Mets (2005–2011) ===
==== 2005–06 ====
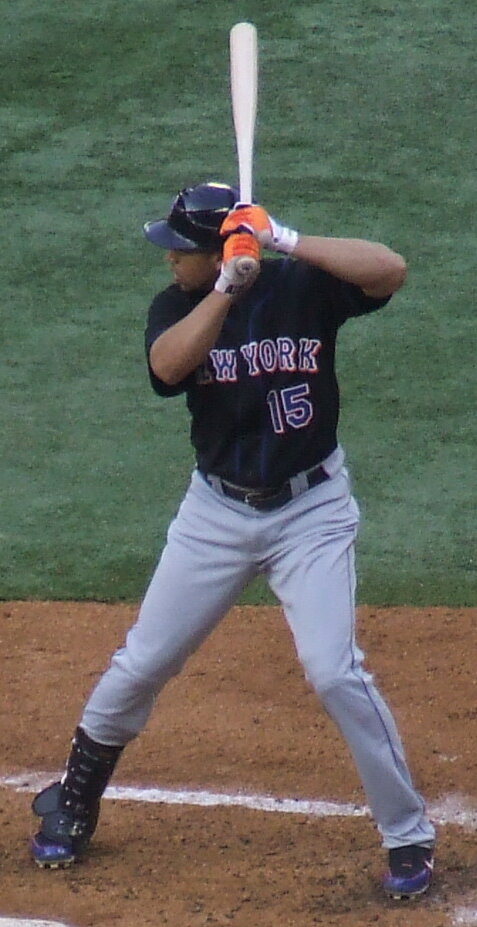
Beltrán with the New York Mets in 2005

Following the 2004 season, Beltrán became a free agent. The Yankees were tipped as favorites, and Beltrán allegedly offered them a $19 million discount. The Yankees declined, and the crosstown New York Mets signed him to a seven-year, $119-million contract, the biggest in franchise history at the time. It became the tenth contract in baseball history to surpass $100 million.

On August 11, 2005, in a game against the San Diego Padres at Petco Park, Beltrán was seriously injured after colliding head-to-head with fellow Mets outfielder Mike Cameron when both were diving to catch a ball in shallow right center field. Cameron missed the rest of the season with a concussion, temporary loss of vision, and two broken cheekbones. Beltrán suffered vertigo for a while, although both players eventually recovered.

A quadriceps injury bothered him most of the 2005 season and limited his speed. In 582 at bats, Beltrán's stats included career lows in batting average (.266), home runs (16), RBIs (78), runs scored (83), and stolen bases (17). Despite the limited participation, he was still voted to his second All-Star team.

Beltrán played for Puerto Rico in the 2006 World Baseball Classic, joining Carlos Delgado, Bernie Williams, Javier Vázquez, Iván Rodríguez and others on the team managed by St. Louis Cardinals third base coach José Oquendo. His 2006 season was an upgrade on his first year in New York. Boosted by 10 home runs in May, he surpassed his home run total from the previous year before the season was half over. Beltrán's performance secured him a spot in the 2006 All-Star Game, his third. Five other Mets joined him, including three as starters. Beltrán was a standout for the NL as the only batter with multiple hits, along with two stolen bases. He scored the go-ahead run that gave the National League a 2–1 lead in the third inning, though the American League won the game. He hit grand slams in consecutive games on July 16 and 18, becoming the 23rd player to do so. Another grand slam at the end of July made him only the third Met to hit three in one season. Beltrán continued to produce with a walk-off home run against the Cardinals on August 22, off closer Jason Isringhausen. It was Beltrán's second walk-off of the season, following a 16th-inning gamewinner against the Philadelphia Phillies.

Beltrán's 41 home runs tied the Mets' single season record for homers, matching Todd Hundley's total in 1996. (The record was broken by Pete Alonso in 2019.) His 127 runs scored gave him sole possession of the Mets' single-season franchise mark. He and teammate José Reyes won the Silver Slugger Award at their respective positions. He also tied for the major league lead in times reached base on an error (13).

Beltrán's defense was also recognized during the 2006 season, as he received his first Gold Glove Award. He made only two errors in 372 total chances to give him a .995 fielding percentage, and recorded 13 outfield assists and 6 double plays. He also won a Fielding Bible Award as the top fielding center fielder in the major leagues. Beltrán finished fourth in the NL's Most Valuable Player Award voting, behind winner Ryan Howard, Albert Pujols, and Lance Berkman. Returning to the playoffs, Beltrán hit three home runs in the NLCS, bringing his career playoff total to 11 home runs in 22 games. However, with the bases loaded and two outs in the ninth inning of Game 7 against the Cardinals, Beltrán struck out looking against Adam Wainwright, ending the Mets season.

==== 2007–08 ====
In 2007, Beltrán hit below .230 from May to July. However, he improved in August and September, finishing with a .276 batting average and 112 RBIs. In July, he made his fourth All-Star Game appearance and upon the conclusion of the season, won his second straight Gold Glove Award.

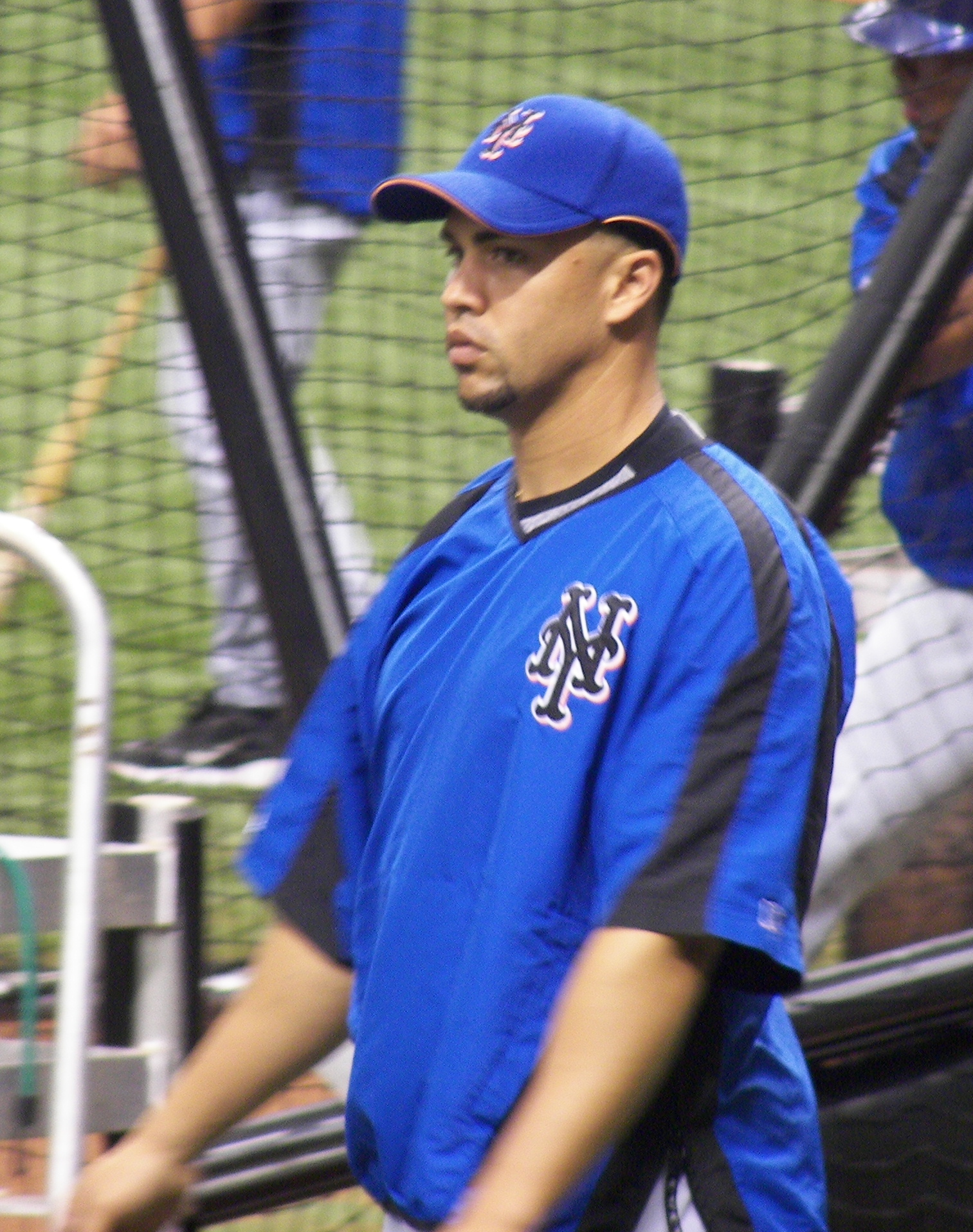
Beltrán in 2007 spring training

In 2008, Beltrán batted .284 with 27 home runs and 112 RBI. In the final game before the All-Star game, he hit his 15th home run of the season. On August 29, Beltrán collected all five RBIs for the Mets including a grand slam with two outs in the 9th to give the Mets a 5–2 lead, going on to win 5–4. Beltrán hit the last and only Mets home run in the final regular season game at Shea Stadium (the last home run was by Dan Uggla). The home run was a two-run shot that tied the game 2–2 against the Florida Marlins. Beltrán won his third straight Gold Glove award in the outfield for the Mets. He also won his second Fielding Bible Award as the top major league center fielder.

==== 2009–2011 ====
Beltrán recorded his 1,000th RBI against Scott Olsen (of the Washington Nationals with a triple in the third inning on April 24, 2009.

In voting for the 2009 All Star Game, Beltrán was third among NL outfielders (2,812,295 votes), trailing only Ryan Braun (4,138,559) and Raúl Ibañez (4,053,355).

On January 13, 2010, Beltrán had surgery on his knee and was originally expected to miss 8–12 weeks. The procedure was performed by Beltrán's personal physician Dr. Richard Steadman. The Mets stated that the surgery was done without their consent, and the team expressed their disappointment with Beltrán's decision. However, his agent Scott Boras claimed that the Mets consented to the procedure. Beltrán played his first game of the 2010 season on July 15.

Due to his declining defense, in 2011 Beltrán was moved from center field to right field. On May 12, playing against the Colorado Rockies, Beltrán hit three two-run home runs in a 9–5 Mets road victory. It was the only three-home run game of his career, and he became only the eighth Mets hitter in history to hit three home runs in a game.

=== San Francisco Giants (2011) ===
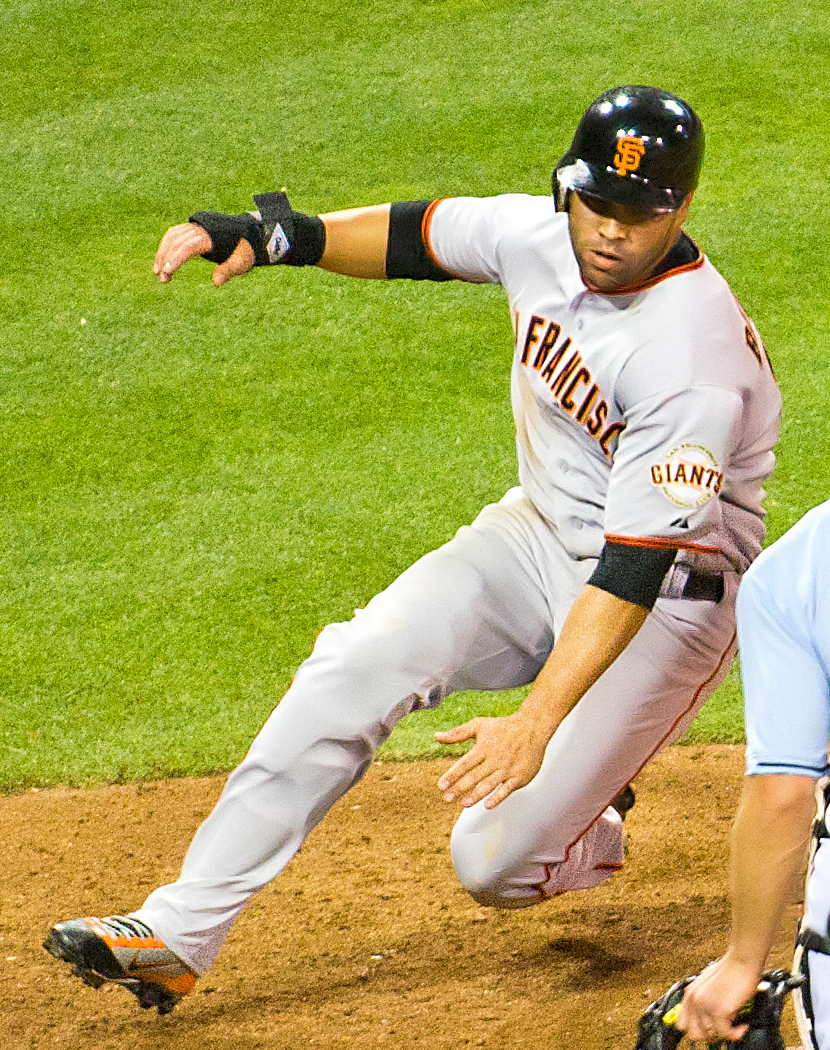
Beltrán playing for the San Francisco Giants in 2011

On July 28, 2011, after he waived his no-trade clause, the Mets traded Beltrán to the San Francisco Giants in exchange for pitching prospect Zack Wheeler. The Mets also sent $4 million cash to the Giants to cover Beltrán's remaining $6.5 million contract, which expired at the end of the 2011 season.

The day after the trade, Beltrán got his first hit with the Giants (an RBI single to left field in the first inning), going 1-for-5 while playing right field against the Cincinnati Reds. The Giants eventually lost to the Reds 4–3 in thirteen innings.

On September 14, Beltrán hit two solo home runs against San Diego Padres starting pitcher Mat Latos. The shot gave him 20 home runs for the season and 300 for his career. Prior to this game, Beltrán had never hit against Latos. Both home runs were hit to the right side of the field with Beltrán batting from the left side. The 299th hit the arcade, and the 300th landed in McCovey Cove which increased the "Splash Hit" count to 59. Both home runs proved to be crucial, as the Giants swept the Padres in a 3-game series, with a score of 3–1. His home runs in the series accounted for 4 out of the 14 runs.

For the rest of the 2011 season with the Giants, Beltrán played 44 games batting .323 with 7 home runs and 18 RBI. Overall in 2011, Beltrán played 142 total games batting .300 with 22 home runs and 84 RBI.

=== St. Louis Cardinals (2012–2013) ===
==== 2012 ====
On December 22, 2011, Beltrán agreed to a two-year deal with the St. Louis Cardinals worth $26 million which included a full no-trade clause. After Beltrán signed with the Cardinals, he attained numerous milestones, personal as well other firsts.

On April 4, 2012 (Opening Day), Beltrán recorded the first-ever hit in a regular-season game at Marlins Park against Josh Johnson of the Miami Marlins. On May 2 he had a career-high 7 RBI in a 12-2 win over the Pittsburgh Pirates with a pair of three-run home runs and an RBI single. Beltrán was named NL Player of the Week on May 14 after he hit .360 (9-for-25) with 6 home runs, 13 RBIs, 8 runs and 30 total bases for a 1.200 slugging percentage and 1.648 OPS in the previous six games, including a 9-7 12-inning loss to the Atlanta Braves on May 11 in which he had a career-high 13 total bases with a pair of home runs, a triple and a double. He hit safely in five of the six games and homered in four of them. It was his ninth career weekly award, and sixth in the NL.

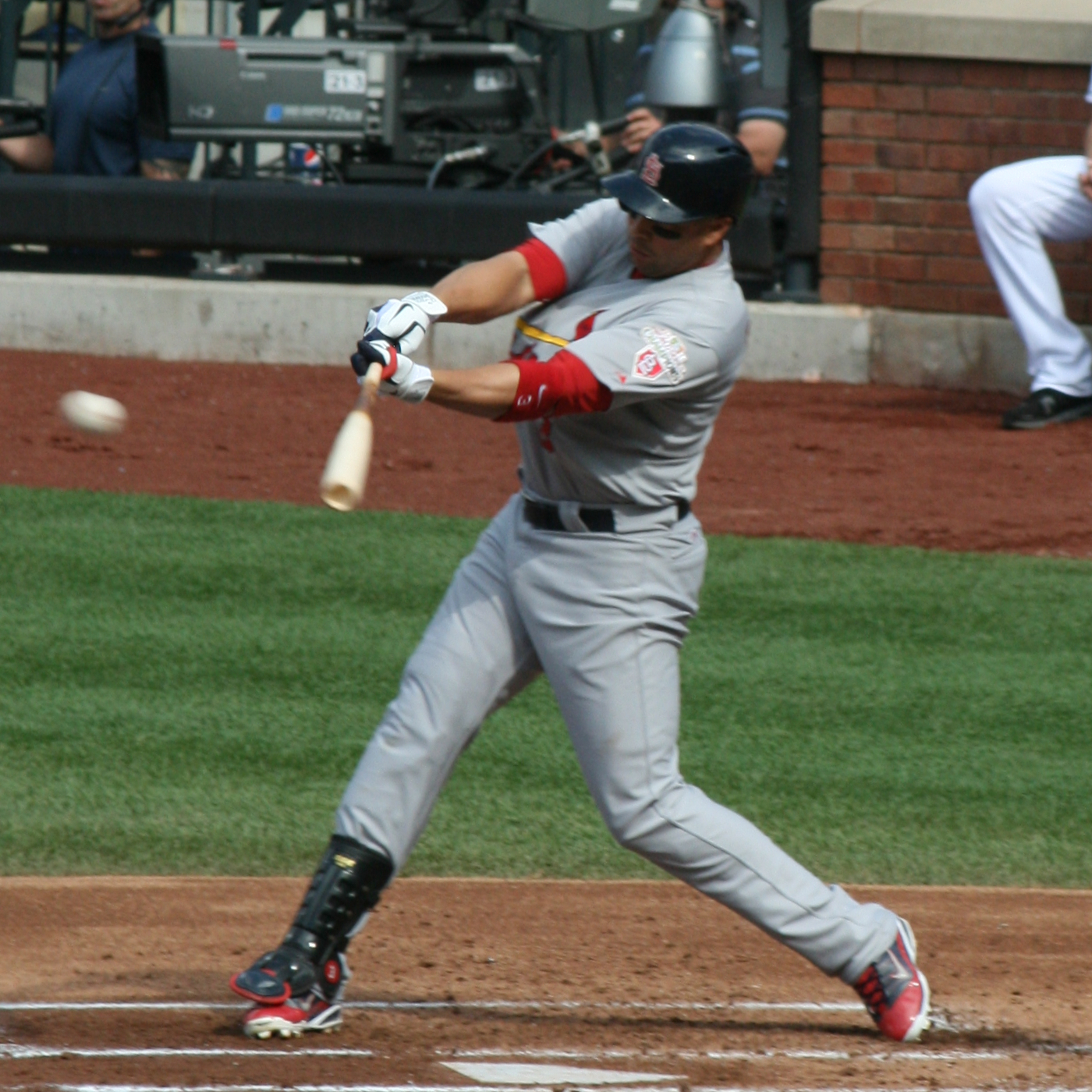
Beltrán batting for the St. Louis Cardinals in 2012

On June 1, in his first game at Citi Field after leaving the Mets, the crowd gave him a standing ovation. In one notable moment, a Beltrán batted ball touched the outside part of the foul line but was ruled a foul ball in a game in which former teammate Johan Santana was credited with throwing the first no-hitter in Mets history. Two weeks later, on June 15, while batting against another former team in the Kansas City Royals, Beltrán stole second base in the second inning to become the first switch-hitter in major league history to attain 300 home runs and 300 stolen bases, and the eighth player overall.

In a June 29 home game versus the Pittsburgh Pirates, he recorded a single in the third inning for his 2,000th hit, becoming the 270th player in major league history to do so. The day after he got his 2,000th hit, Beltrán collected his 400th double, becoming the 170th player to do so. Beltrán also participated in that year's Home Run Derby.

The Mets announced on June 18, 2012, that Beltrán was selected as the starting center fielder for 50th Anniversary Mets All-Time Team.

In the 2012 National League Wild Card Game, his first postseason game since 2006, Beltrán had 1 hit in 4 at bats, scoring a run in the 4th inning. In the NLDS against the Nationals, Beltrán went 8–18 at the plate with 2 home runs and 4 RBI. Down 5–7 in the 9th inning in Game 5, Beltrán hit a leadoff double off of Drew Storen, eventually scoring two outs later on a Daniel Descalso single. The Cardinals would win the game 9–7.

In the 2012 National League Championship Series, Beltrán batted .300 with 2 RBI and 2 stolen bases. He played in 6 of the 7 games in the series, missing most of Game 3 and all of Game 4 after suffering a knee injury. Playing in the third NLCS Game 7 of his career, Beltrán went 1–4 at the plate as the Cardinals lost 9-0 to the Giants.

==== 2013 ====
In 2013, Beltrán played in 145 games with a .296 batting average, 24 home runs and 84 RBI. Beltrán played in his 2,000th game on July 11, 2013. That same month, he was selected to his third straight All-Star Game. In October, Beltrán was the recipient of the Roberto Clemente Award, becoming the fourth Cardinals player to win it, joining Lou Brock, Ozzie Smith, and Albert Pujols.

In the 2013 National League Division Series against the Pirates, Beltrán had 4 hits in 18 at bats, hitting 2 home runs with 6 RBI in the series. In Game 1 of the 2013 National League Championship Series against the Los Angeles Dodgers, Beltrán hit a double at the bottom of the 3rd inning to tie the game 2–2. In the top of the 10th inning, with the game still tied 2–2, Beltrán threw out Mark Ellis at the plate after catching a fly ball, completing a double play that prevented the Dodgers from taking the lead. At the bottom of the 13th inning, Beltrán hit a walk-off single off of Kenley Jansen, giving the Cardinals a 3–2 victory. For the whole NLCS, Beltrán had 6 hits and 6 RBI in 21 at bats. The Cardinals won the series 4–2, and Beltrán advanced to the first World Series in his career.

In Game 1 of the 2013 World Series against the Boston Red Sox, Beltrán injured his ribs in the 2nd inning after robbing David Ortiz of a grand slam. Despite the injury, Beltrán would play in all 6 games of the series, batting .294 with 5 hits and 3 RBI as the Cardinals fell to the Red Sox four games to two.

Beltrán filed for free agency after the World Series ended on October 30. On November 9, Beltrán declined a one-year, $14.1 million qualifying offer from the Cardinals, making him a free agent.

=== New York Yankees (2014–2016) ===
On December 6, 2013, Beltrán agreed to a three-year, $45 million deal to join the New York Yankees, despite receiving a $48 million offer from another team. The deal became official on December 19, 2013.

==== 2014 ====
On April 13, 2014, Beltrán played at first base for the first time in his professional career after Francisco Cervelli left the game due to a hamstring injury. On the night of May 12, 2014, Beltrán experienced soreness in his right elbow. It was revealed that the elbow had a bone spur, and he was immediately given a cortisone shot. He was placed on the 15-day disabled list on May 15, 2014. He was activated on June 5, 2014. To prevent any further damage to the elbow, he was used primarily as a designated hitter for the remainder of the season.

On September 16, 2014, Beltrán left the team for an indefinite period of time due to his wife's miscarriage. Limited to 109 games in 2014, Beltrán batted .233 with 15 home runs and 49 RBI. On October 1, 2014, he underwent surgery to remove loose pieces and a bone spur in his right elbow, which required 12 weeks to recover. The procedure was performed by Yankees head team physician Dr. Christopher Ahmad.

==== 2015 ====
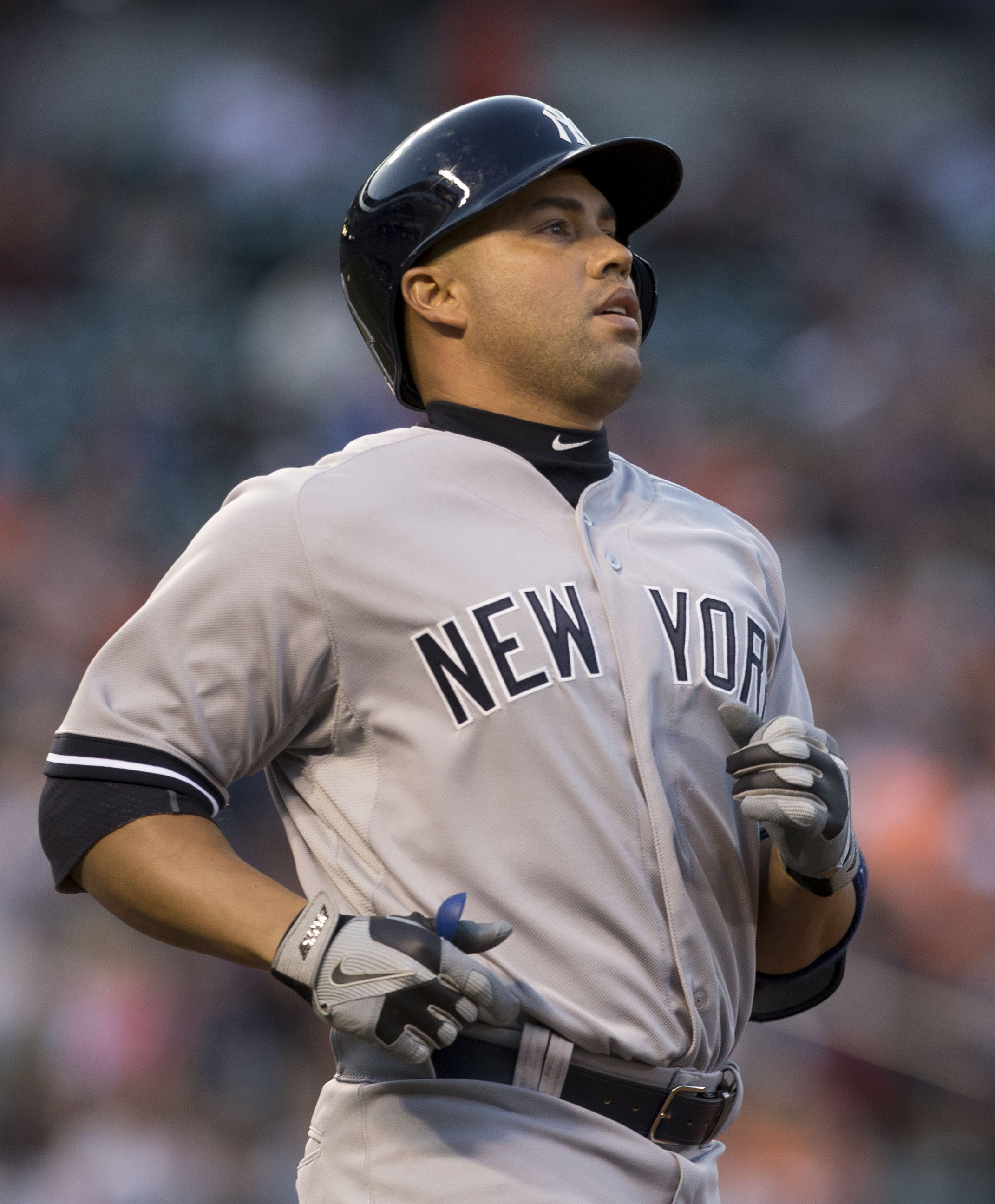
Beltrán with the New York Yankees in 2015

Beltrán got off to a slow start in 2015, batting .162 through April. He slowly improved throughout the season and by the end of August had a batting average over .280. On July 3, Beltrán was placed on the 15-day disabled list with an oblique injury. He was activated on July 19. On August 14 against the Toronto Blue Jays, Beltrán hit a pinch-hit go-ahead 3-run home run in the 8th inning. It proved to be the game winner and temporarily put the Yankees back in first place. He reached 500 career doubles on August 31 against the Boston Red Sox. Beltrán ended the regular season with 19 home runs, 67 RBIs and a .276 average in 133 games.

In the 2015 American League Wild Card Game against the Astros, Beltrán had 1 hit in 4 at bats as the Yankees fell to the Astros 3–0.

==== 2016 ====
On April 25, 2016, Beltrán became the 84th player to make 10,000 career plate appearances. He collected his 2,473rd career hit on April 27 against the Texas Rangers to pass Ted Simmons for tenth place on the all-time list for switch hitters. Beltrán hit his 400th career home run against the White Sox on May 15, the 54th player in major league history to do, the fourth switch hitter, the third Puerto Rican-born player, and the fifth to do so with 300 stolen bases and 500 doubles. On May 28, Beltrán homered for his 2,500th career hit off Matt Moore of the Tampa Bay Rays, joining Roberto Clemente, Iván Rodríguez and Roberto Alomar as just the fourth Puerto Rican-born player to reach the milestone, and the 99th player overall to reach 2,500 hits. He became the fourth player, after Willie Mays, Barry Bonds and Alex Rodriguez, to reach 2,500 hits, 400 homers, 300 stolen bases and 1,000 walks.

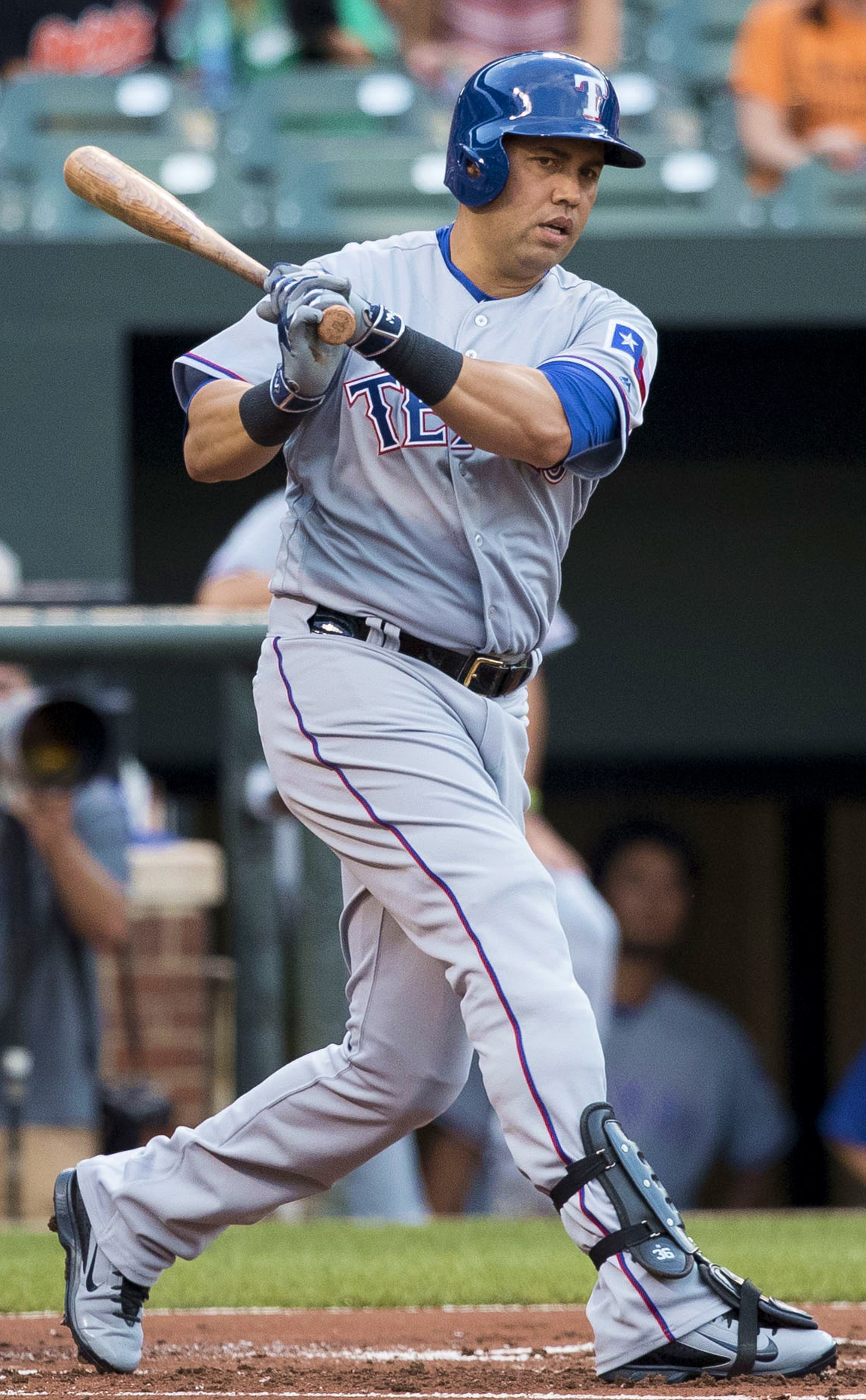
Beltrán with the Texas Rangers in 2016

On June 7, Beltrán became the 38th player to record 1,000 career extra base hits. He was selected to his ninth All-Star Game at Petco Park in San Diego. In a 5–3 loss to the Boston Red Sox on July 15, he became the 55th player, and fourth switch hitter, to reach 1,500 RBIs for his career. In 99 games with the Yankees, Beltrán batted .304 with 22 home runs and 64 RBI.

=== Texas Rangers (2016) ===
On August 1, 2016, the Yankees traded Beltrán to the Texas Rangers for prospects Dillon Tate, Erik Swanson, and Nick Green. Beltrán hit his first home run for Texas on August 3 against the Baltimore Orioles, also scoring his 1,500th run on the play. Towards the end of the season, Beltrán stated that he had "no plans to retire", contradicting his statements before the season. Beltrán ended the season with a .295 average, 29 home runs and 93 RBI in 151 games between the Yankees and Rangers.

In the 2016 ALDS, Beltrán batted 2-for-11 with one RBI in three games as the Toronto Blue Jays swept the Rangers.

=== Houston Astros (2017) ===
On December 3, 2016, Beltrán signed a one-year, $16 million contract to return to the Houston Astros for the 2017 season as their designated hitter. According to a 2023 Frontline documentary about the Astros during the period, former Astros GM Jeff Luhnow stated that they signed Beltrán due to his potential effect and influence on the team's clubhouse and its young roster, and not for his analytical production. Former Astros video and advance info manager Antonio Padilla also stated that upon his arrival, he was viewed as a leader of the team, was a walking encyclopedia, and remarked that he had an aura around him on the team, especially with its Latin players who viewed him very prestigiously. On July 17, after not having played in the field in two months, his teammates held a mock funeral for his glove.

The Astros won 101 games and clinched the AL West division title, marking the second time in franchise history they won at least 100 games. They faced the Boston Red Sox in the best-of-five ALDS. In Game 4 on October 9, Beltrán hit a ninth-inning RBI double that proved to be the deciding run in a 5–4 victory that clinched the series for the Astros.

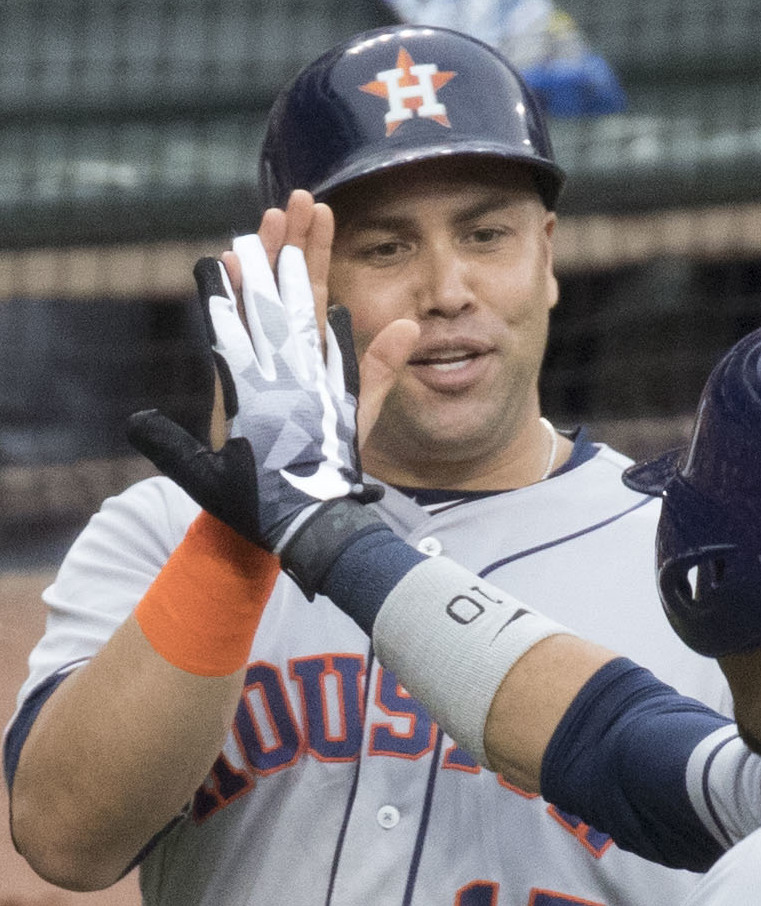
Beltrán with the Houston Astros in 2017

The Astros overcame one of Beltrán's former teams, the Yankees, in the ALCS in seven games. As the Astros advanced to the World Series, it was the second of Beltrán's career, where they opposed the Dodgers. During the series, Beltrán registered three plate appearances over three games, going 0–3. The Astros defeated the Dodgers in seven games, making Beltrán a World Series champion. Beltrán announced his retirement from playing on November 13, 2017.

Two years later, it was revealed that the Astros had broken MLB rules under a sign stealing scandal during the 2017 season. According to the report, an electronic sign-stealing scheme was implemented during the season, allegedly spearheaded by a coach and a "veteran player". Many have speculated that the coach and player in question were Alex Cora and Beltrán, with some Astros players' testimonies lining up with some of their speculations. When Major League Baseball confirmed that the Astros had stolen signs illegally, Beltrán was the only player named in the commissioner's report. Beltrán apologized for his role in the scandal.

=== Career statistics ===
In 2,586 games over 20 seasons, Beltrán posted a .279 batting average (2,725-for-9,768) with 1,582 runs, 565 doubles, 78 triples, 435 home runs, 1,587 runs batted in, 312 stolen bases, 1,084 walks, a .350 on-base percentage and .486 slugging percentage. He finished his career with a .986 fielding percentage playing primarily in center and right field. His 565 doubles were second only to Pete Rose's 746 among switch hitters, and his 1,078 extra base hits were only 21 away from Eddie Murray's record for switch hitters. In 65 postseason games, Beltrán batted .307 (66-for-215) with 45 runs, 15 doubles, 16 home runs, 42 RBI, 11 stolen bases and 37 walks. He broke the 1.000 OPS mark in four different playoff series. Beltrán also had a 100% stolen base percentage (11-for-11) during the playoffs, which are the most stolen bases without being caught.

== International career ==
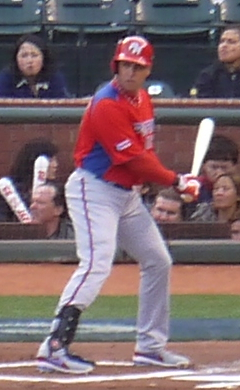
Beltrán batting for the Puerto Rico national team in the 2013 World Baseball Classic.

Beltrán has appeared in the four editions of the World Baseball Classic (2006, 2009, 2013, 2017) for Team Puerto Rico. In the 2017 World Baseball Classic, he batted 4th in the lineup as their designated hitter. Following the conclusion of the tournament, which was won by United States upon beating Puerto Rico in the final, Beltrán was named to the 2017 All-World Baseball Classic team.

== Post-playing career ==
Following the 2017 season, the New York Yankees' managerial position became available, for which Beltrán interviewed. The Yankees eventually selected Aaron Boone to be the manager. In December 2018, the Yankees hired Beltrán as a special adviser to general manager Brian Cashman.

On November 1, 2019, the Mets hired Beltrán as their manager to replace Mickey Callaway, signing him to a three-year contract with a club option for a fourth year. However, on January 16, 2020, before Beltrán ever managed a game, he and the Mets mutually agreed to part ways after he was the only player implicated by name for his role in the Houston Astros sign stealing scandal.

On January 28, 2022, the YES Network hired Beltran as a game analyst.

On February 6, 2023, he left the Yankees broadcast team and joined the Mets front office.

== Personal life ==
Beltrán and his wife Jessica have two daughters and one son. They reside in New York City. Beltrán's cousin Rey Fuentes is also a baseball player who saw playing time with three major league teams. A nephew, Matthew Lugo, was drafted by the Red Sox in 2019.

Beltrán is a Christian. While sliding into second base for his 300th career steal on June 15, 2012, joining the 300–300 club, a cross necklace popped out of his jersey, and after the game, he told a reporter "all the glory" was God's.

In 2004, Beltrán was one of 24 athletes who signed an open letter endorsing George W. Bush's reelection campaign.

Since establishing his foundation, Beltrán began a fund with part of his salary, intending to establish a high school focused on developing young athletes. Construction of the Carlos Beltrán Baseball Academy began in 2009, in the municipality of Florida, Puerto Rico. Beltrán donated over $4 million to the academy, built on 20 acres (81,000 m^{2}) of land donated by the local government. The school opened in 2011 and graduated its first class in June 2013. It accepts students between the ages of 14 and 18 years, with a curriculum that includes instruction by MLB players.

In 2017, Beltrán was named winner of Sports Illustrated's inaugural Hope Award for his work in assisting Puerto Rico in the aftermath of Hurricane Maria.

== Awards and accomplishments ==
Carlos Beltrán's number 15 was retired by the New York Mets in 2026.

Beltrán was inducted into the Baseball Hall of Fame in 2026. As a result, his number 15 was retired by the Mets on September 19. 2026.

Honors received
Act of honor bestowed	Dates	Ref
50th Anniversary All-Time Mets Team Starting Centerfielder	2012	

Awards received
Name of award	Times	Dates	Ref
American League Rookie of the Year	1	1999	
Baseball America Rookie of the Year	1	1999	
Fielding Bible Award at center field	2	2006, 2008	
Kansas City Royals Player of the Year	2	2001, 2003	
Major League Baseball All-Star	9	2004–07, 2009, 2011–13, 2016	
Major League Baseball Player of the Month Award	1	April 2004	
Major League Baseball Player of the Week Award	10		
Players Choice Awards for Outstanding Rookie	1	1999	
Rawlings Gold Glove Award at outfield	3	2006–08	
Roberto Clemente Award	1	2013	
Silver Slugger Award at outfield	2	2006, 2007	
The Sporting News Rookie of the Year Award	1	1999	
World Series champion	1	2017	

Milestones achieved

- 1,000 runs scored (August 12, 2008)
- 1,000 RBIs (April 24, 2009)
- 300 stolen bases (June 15, 2012)
- 2,000 hits (June 29, 2012)
- 400 doubles (June 30, 2012)
- 500 doubles (August 31, 2015)
- 400 home runs (May 15, 2016)
- 2,500 hits (May 28, 2016)
- 1,000 extra base hits (June 7, 2016)
- 1,500 RBIs (July 15, 2016)
- 1,500 runs (August 3, 2016)

Other distinctions

- Mets single-season record holder for runs scored (127)
- Mets single-season record for home runs (41) by a switch-hitter with Todd Hundley
- Tied single postseason record for home runs (Houston Astros, 8)
- First switch hitter and eighth player to attain 300 home runs and 300 stolen bases (June 15, 2012)
- Highest stolen base percentage (minimum of 250 attempts): 86.4%

== See also ==
- 30–30 club
- List of Gold Glove Award winners at outfield
- List of Major League Baseball career at bat leaders
- List of Major League Baseball career doubles leaders
- List of Major League Baseball career extra base hits leaders
- List of Major League Baseball career hits leaders
- List of Major League Baseball career home run leaders
- List of Major League Baseball career plate appearance leaders
- List of Major League Baseball career putouts as a center fielder leaders
- List of Major League Baseball career runs batted in leaders
- List of Major League Baseball career runs scored leaders
- List of Major League Baseball career strikeouts by batters leaders
- List of Major League Baseball career total bases leaders
- List of Major League Baseball players from Puerto Rico
- List of Silver Slugger Award winners at outfield

Awards and achievements
Preceded by Kerry Wood	Baseball America Rookie of the Year; 1999	Succeeded by Rafael Furcal
Preceded by Ben Grieve	Players Choice AL Most Outstanding Rookie; 1999	Succeeded by Terrence Long
Preceded by Alfonso Soriano	American League Player of the Month; April 2004	Succeeded by Melvin Mora
