= 2026 Baseball Hall of Fame balloting =

Elections to the Baseball Hall of Fame

National Baseball

Hall of Fame and Museum
- New inductees: 3
- via BBWAA: 2
- via Contemporary Baseball Era Committee: 1
- Total inductees: 354
- Induction date: July 26, 2026

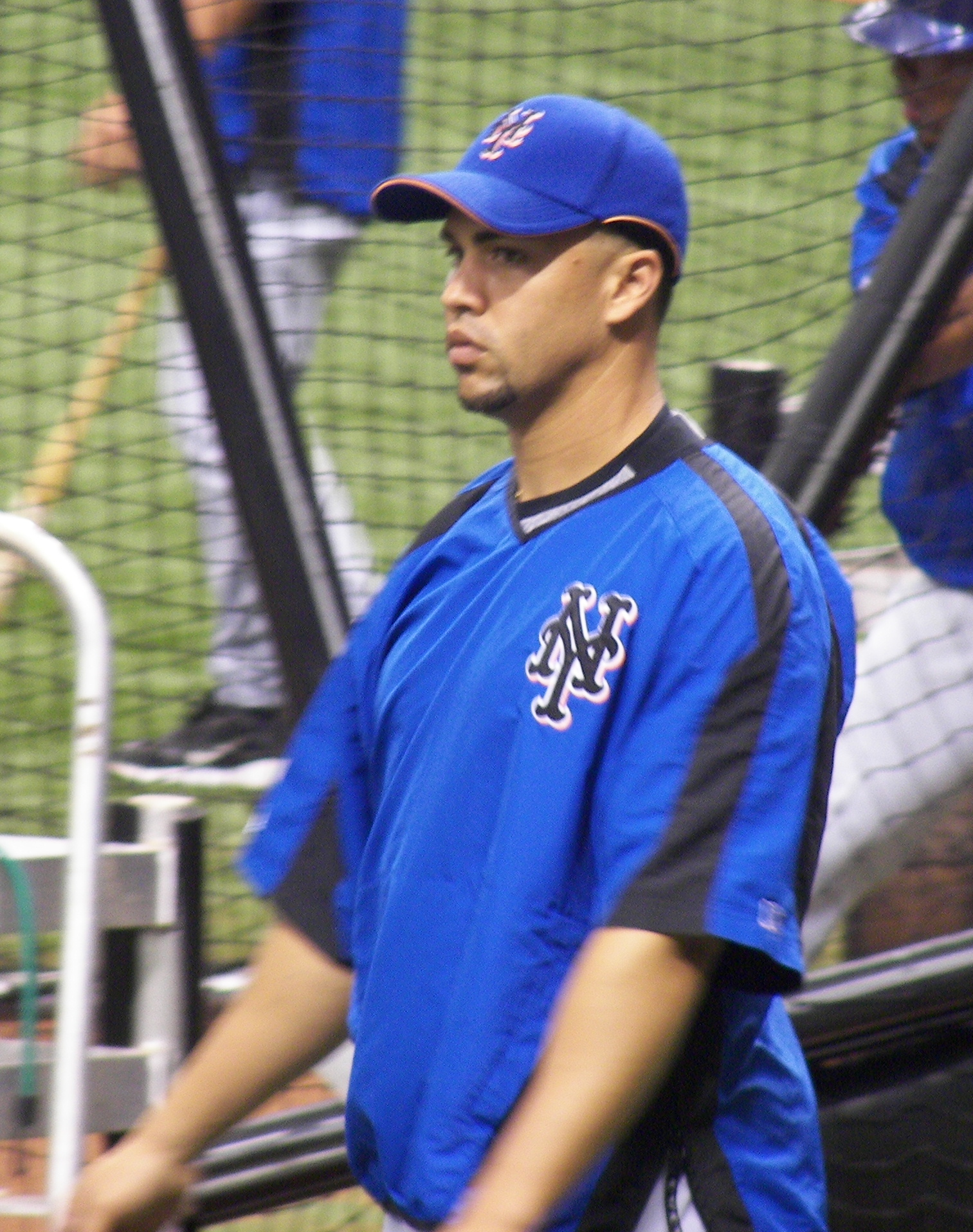
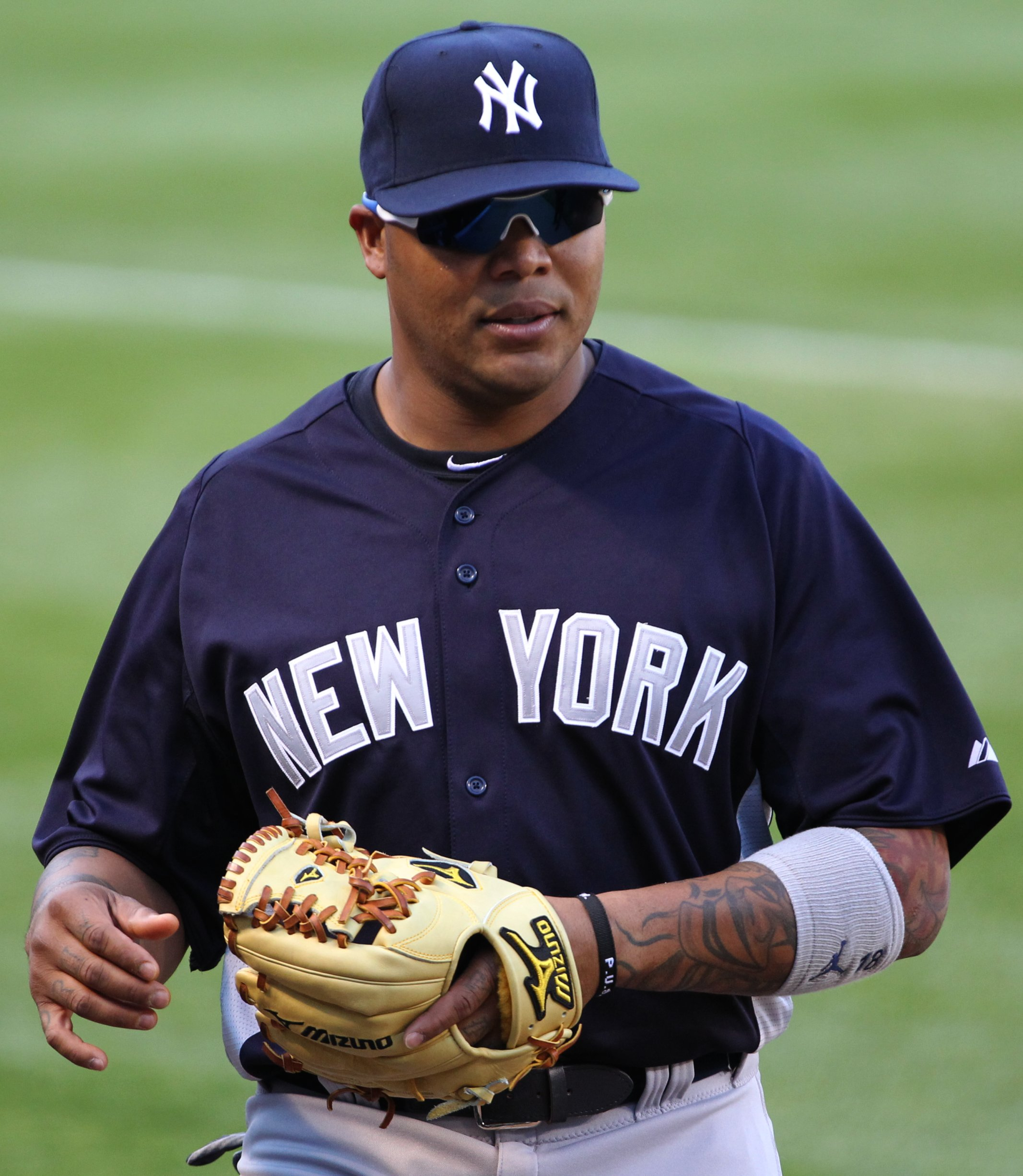
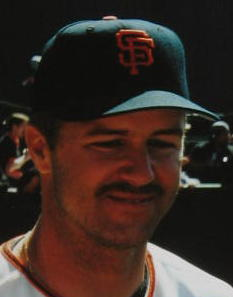
2026 inductees (L-R): Carlos Beltrán, Andruw Jones, and Jeff Kent

Elections to the Baseball Hall of Fame for 2026 were conducted according to the rules most recently amended in 2022. As in the past, the Baseball Writers' Association of America (BBWAA) voted by mail to select from a ballot of recently retired players. The results were announced on January 20.

Two candidates were inducted by the BBWAA: Carlos Beltrán and Andruw Jones. Beltrán was inducted in his fourth year of eligibility, and Jones was in his ninth year of eligibility. Jones received 7.3% of the vote in his first year on the ballot in 2018, the lowest first-year percentage ever for a candidate eventually voted in by the BBWAA.

A meeting of the Contemporary Baseball Era committee—one of a group of three rotating bodies generally referred to as the Veterans Committee and whose structure was amended in April 2022—was held in December 2025 to consider players from the era after 1980 who no longer appear on the BBWAA ballot. Jeff Kent was elected from the Veterans Committee ballot.

The new inductees were honored in a ceremony in Cooperstown, New York, on July 26, 2026.

== BBWAA election ==
The list of players appearing on the BBWAA ballot was released on November 17, 2025. There were 15 players carried over from the 2025 ballot, who garnered at least 5% of the vote and are still eligible for election, as well as 12 players whose last major league appearance was in 2020, played at least 10 seasons in Major League Baseball, and were chosen by a screening committee. This was the final ballot for Manny Ramirez. A total of 425 ballots were cast, with 319 votes needed to reach the 75% threshold for election. A total of 2,452 votes were cast for individual players, an average of 5.77 votes per ballot.

Hall of Fame voting results for class of 2026
Player	Votes	Percent	Change	Year
**Carlos Beltrán**	358	84.2%	▲13.9%	4th
**Andruw Jones**	333	78.4%	▲12.2%	9th
Chase Utley	251	59.1%	▲19.3%	3rd
Andy Pettitte	206	48.5%	▲20.6%	8th
Félix Hernández	196	46.1%	▲25.5%	2nd
Alex Rodriguez	170	40.0%	▲2.9%	5th
Manny Ramirez	165	38.8%	▲4.5%	10th
Bobby Abreu	131	30.8%	▲11.3%	7th
Jimmy Rollins	108	25.4%	▲7.4%	5th
Cole Hamels†	101	23.8%	–	1st
Dustin Pedroia	88	20.7%	▲8.8%	2nd
Mark Buehrle	85	20.0%	▲8.6%	6th
Omar Vizquel	78	18.4%	▲0.6%	9th
David Wright	63	14.8%	▲6.7%	3rd
Francisco Rodríguez	50	11.8%	▲1.6%	4th
Torii Hunter	37	8.7%	▲3.6%	6th
Ryan Braun†*	15	3.5%	–	1st
Edwin Encarnación†*	6	1.4%	–	1st
Shin-Soo Choo†*	3	0.7%	–	1st
Matt Kemp†*	2	0.5%	–	1st
Hunter Pence†*	2	0.5%	–	1st
Rick Porcello†*	2	0.5%	–	1st
Alex Gordon†*	1	0.2%	–	1st
Nick Markakis†*	1	0.2%	–	1st
Gio González†*	0	0.0%	–	1st
Howie Kendrick†*	0	0.0%	–	1st
Daniel Murphy†*	0	0.0%	–	1st

Key
	Elected to the Hall of Fame on this ballot (named in **bold italics**).
	Elected subsequently, as of 2026 (named in plain italics).
	Renominated for the 2027 BBWAA election by adequate performance on this ballot and has not subsequently been eliminated.
	Eliminated from annual BBWAA consideration by poor performance or expiration on subsequent ballots.
	Eliminated from annual BBWAA consideration by poor performance or expiration on this ballot.
†	First time on the BBWAA ballot.
*	Eliminated from annual BBWAA consideration by poor performance on this ballot (not expiration).

Players who met first-year eligibility requirements but were not selected by the screening committee for inclusion on the ballot were: Homer Bailey, Emilio Bonifácio, Francisco Cervelli, Chris Davis, Tyler Flowers, Logan Forsythe, Kelvin Herrera, Jared Hughes, Jeremy Jeffress, Jason Kipnis, Erik Kratz, Logan Morrison, Juan Nicasio, Iván Nova, Eduardo Núñez, Sean Rodriguez, Jeff Samardzija, Justin Smoak, Edinson Vólquez, Neil Walker, and Matt Wieters.

== Contemporary Baseball Era Committee ==
The Contemporary Baseball Era Committee met in December 2025 at baseball's winter meetings to consider candidates from the era beginning in 1980, players who have been retired at least 15 years and played most of their careers after 1980. The 16-member committee voted on a ballot listing eight former players. The full ballot was announced on November 3, 2025, and the voting was held on December 7. The results of the voting were announced on the evening of December 7, with Jeff Kent being elected.

Starting with this ballot, any candidate not receiving at least five votes will be ineligible for consideration in the committee's next ballot, and any candidate who does not receive at least five votes in multiple ballots will be permanently ineligible for all of the committee's future ballots.

Candidate	Votes	Percent
**Jeff Kent**	14	87.5%
Carlos Delgado	9	56.25%
Don Mattingly	6	37.5%
Dale Murphy	6	37.5%
Barry Bonds	<5	
Roger Clemens	<5	
Gary Sheffield	<5	
Fernando Valenzuela	<5	

Key
Elected to the Hall of Fame on this ballot (named in **bold italics**).
Elected subsequently, as of 2026 (named in plain italics).
Ineligible for the 2029 Veterans Committee election by poor performance on this ballot and has not subsequently been eliminated.
Eliminated from triennial Veterans Committee consideration by poor performance on subsequent ballots.
Eliminated from triennial Veterans Committee consideration by poor performance on this ballot.

The committee consisted of the following individuals:

- Hall of Famers: Ferguson Jenkins, Jim Kaat, Juan Marichal, Tony Pérez, Ozzie Smith, Alan Trammell, Robin Yount
- Executives: Mark Attanasio, Doug Melvin, Arte Moreno, Kim Ng, Tony Reagins, Terry Ryan
- Media and historians: Steve Hirdt, Tyler Kepner, Jayson Stark

== Ford C. Frick Award ==
The Ford C. Frick Award is presented annually to a broadcaster for "major contributions to baseball" and has been presented annually since 1978. The 2026 award will be a composite ballot of local and national voices, as per the rules most recently amended in 2023. The 2026 finalists, and the teams they are best known as broadcasters for, are:

- Brian Anderson (born 1971), Milwaukee Brewers
- Joe Buck (born 1969), St. Louis Cardinals
- Skip Caray (1939–2008), Atlanta Braves
- René Cárdenas (1930-2026), Spanish-language announcer for the Los Angeles Dodgers, Houston Colt .45s / Astros, and Texas Rangers
- Gary Cohen (born 1958), New York Mets
- Jacques Doucet (1940-2026), French-language announcer for the Montreal Expos and Toronto Blue Jays
- Duane Kuiper (born 1950), San Francisco Giants
- John Rooney (born 1955), St. Louis Cardinals
- Dan Shulman (born 1967), Toronto Blue Jays
- John Sterling (1938-2026), New York Yankees

On December 10, 2025, the Hall of Fame announced Joe Buck as the recipient of the Ford C. Frick Award.

== BBWAA Career Excellence Award ==
The BBWAA Career Excellence Award honors a baseball writer (or writers) "for meritorious contributions to baseball writing" and is presented during Hall of Fame Weekend by that year's President of the Baseball Writers' Association of America (BBWAA). The award is voted upon annually by the BBWAA.

On December 9, 2025, the Hall of Fame announced Paul Hoynes as the recipient of the 2026 BBWAA Career Excellence Award.
