= Jeff Kent =

American baseball player (born 1968)

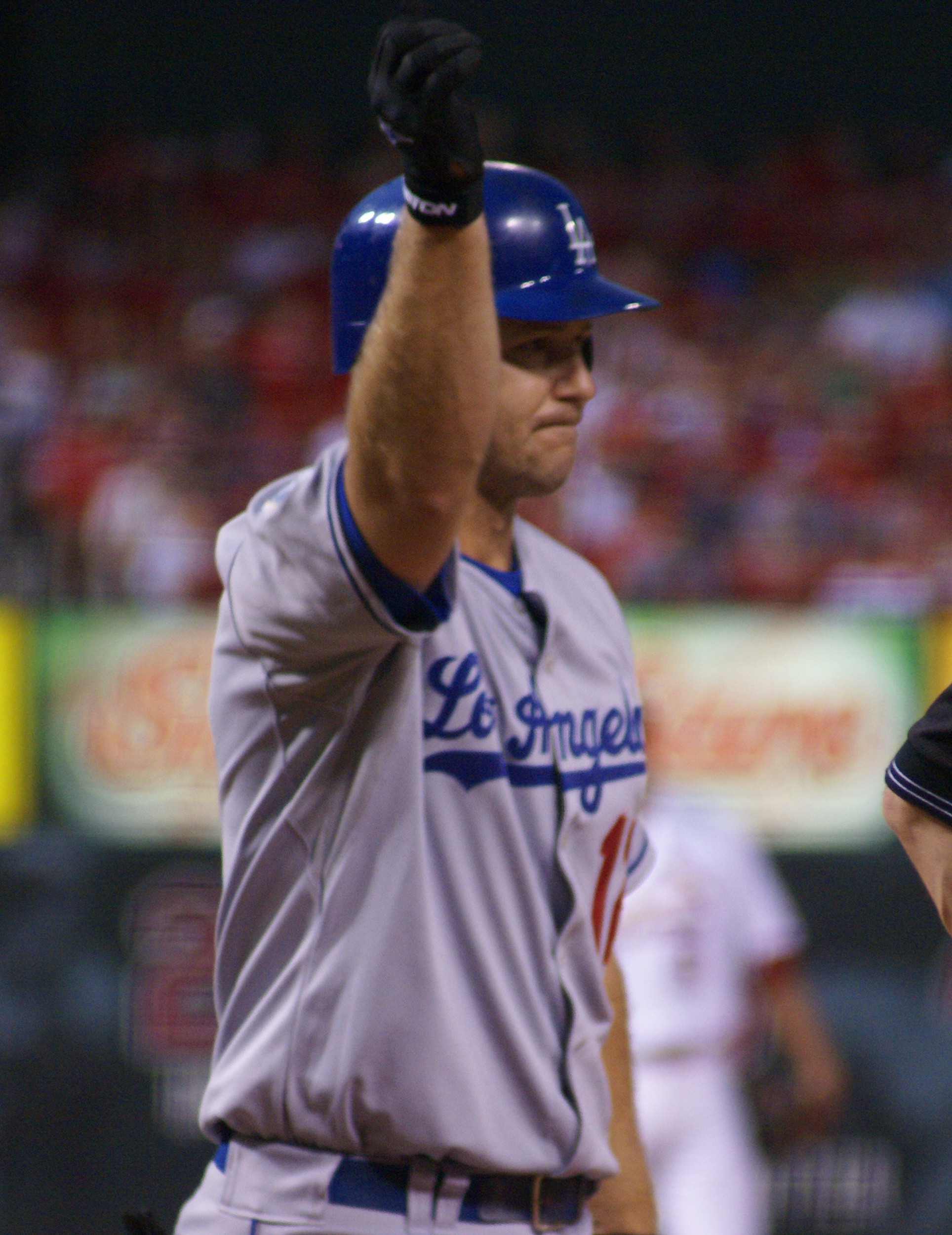
- Kent with the Los Angeles Dodgers in 2008
- Second baseman
- Born: March 7, 1968 (age 58); Bellflower, California, U.S.
- Batted: Right Threw: Right

MLB debut
- April 12, 1992, for the Toronto Blue Jays

Last MLB appearance
- September 27, 2008, for the Los Angeles Dodgers

MLB statistics
- Batting average: .290
- Hits: 2,461
- Home runs: 377
- Runs batted in: 1,518
- Stats at Baseball Reference

Teams
- Toronto Blue Jays (1992); New York Mets (1992–1996); Cleveland Indians (1996); San Francisco Giants (1997–2002); Houston Astros (2003–2004); Los Angeles Dodgers (2005–2008)

Career highlights and awards
- 5× All-Star (1999–2001, 2004, 2005); NL MVP (2000); 4× Silver Slugger Award (2000–2002, 2005); San Francisco Giants No. 21 retired; San Francisco Giants Wall of Fame

Member of the National

Baseball Hall of Fame
- Induction: 2026
- Vote: 87.5%
- Election method: Contemporary Baseball Era Committee

Jeffrey Franklin Kent (born March 7, 1968) is an American former second baseman who played for 17 seasons in Major League Baseball (MLB) from 1992 to 2008. He played for six teams in his career, becoming best known for his six seasons with the San Francisco Giants from 1997 to 2002. A five-time All-Star, he was one of the top power-hitting second basemen in major league history, with twelve seasons of 20 or more home runs and eight seasons with over 100 runs batted in (RBI).

After several seasons of modest success for three teams, often being shifted to third base, Kent enjoyed a surge in productivity at age 29 after being traded to the Giants. He led the team in RBI every year from 1997 to 2000, settling into the cleanup spot in the lineup behind Barry Bonds and helping the team win a division title in 1997 by driving in 121 runs. The following year, he hit 30 home runs for the first time and raised his RBI total to 128, and in 1999, he became the seventh San Francisco player to hit for the cycle. He was named the National League (NL) Most Valuable Player in 2000 after leading the team to the best record in the major leagues, batting .334 with 33 home runs, 125 RBI and a career-high 114 runs scored. In 2001, he set a Giants franchise record by hitting 49 doubles, and in 2002, he batted .313 with a career-high 37 home runs as the team captured its first NL pennant in 13 years. Joining the Houston Astros as a free agent, he helped them reach the 2004 playoffs, leading the club with 107 RBI. He retired after four seasons spent with his hometown Los Angeles Dodgers in 2008.

Kent's 351 home runs as a second baseman are a major league record, and his career .500 slugging percentage is the second highest at the position, behind only Rogers Hornsby. His 540 doubles in the NL were tied for tenth in league history when he retired, with his career total of 560 being the fourth-most by a second baseman; he also ranked third among second basemen in RBI (1,518) and extra-base hits (984), and sixth in total bases (4,246). His 2,008 games at second base in the NL were third-most in league history when he retired, and he ranked eighth in league history in putouts (3,981), sixth in assists (5,508), and fourth in double plays (1,258). In 2026, Kent was inducted into the Baseball Hall of Fame. He subsequently had his number 21 retired by the Giants that same year.

== Early life ==
Jeffrey Franklin Kent was born on March 7, 1968, in Bellflower, California. He graduated from Edison High School in Huntington Beach, where he was an All-Orange County selection as a junior shortstop.

He was dismissed from the baseball team after clashing with his coach over leadership, culminating in Kent being told to switch to second base, which he did not like; he was soon told to turn in his uniform, which he did.

Afterwards, he played with American Legion and Connie Mack League baseball and earned a college scholarship.

== College career ==
Kent played college baseball for the Golden Bears at UC Berkeley from 1987 to 1989. In 1988 he played both in the College World Series, where the Golden Bears were the first team eliminated, and in collegiate summer baseball with the Cotuit Kettleers of the Cape Cod Baseball League. A broken wrist in the midst of his junior season saw him miss the rest of the year and scared off scouts.

== Professional career ==
=== Draft and minor leagues ===
Kent was selected in the 20th round of the 1989 draft by the Toronto Blue Jays, and was assigned to the St. Catharines Blue Jays of the New York–Penn League. He moved up to the Dunedin Blue Jays of the Florida State League in 1990, and the Knoxville Blue Jays of the Southern League in 1991.

=== Toronto Blue Jays (1992) ===
Kent was invited to spring training with the Blue Jays in 1992; he was intended to be sent to AAA with the Syracuse Chiefs, but was called up after Derek Bell suffered a broken wrist in the second game of the year. He made his debut on April 12 in a 3-1 win over the Baltimore Orioles, entering in the 5th inning at third base, and recorded his first career hit in his first at bat, a double leading off the 6th inning against José Mesa. He hit his first home run two days later in a 12-6 win over the New York Yankees off pitcher Lee Guetterman. He saw limited at bats early in the season, not getting a hit between April 25 and May 27; however, an injury to starting third baseman Kelly Gruber granted Kent a more regular role in the lineup.

=== New York Mets (1992–1996) ===
Kent was traded to the New York Mets on August 27, 1992, for pitcher David Cone, as Toronto bolstered their pitching rotation for a successful World Series run; he was awarded a World Series ring despite the trade. His time with the Mets was marked with some success and some failure. Although he batted well, particularly for a second baseman, the Mets were among the worst teams in the National League, never posting a winning record in his five seasons, and finishing with the worst record in the major leagues in 1993. He also struggled in the field, leading NL second basemen in errors in 1993 and 1994. Furthermore, he acquired a poor reputation in the clubhouse, where he was known for a quick temper and isolationism. He refused to participate in his hazing ritual with the Mets, feeling he had left his rookie status back in Toronto. On October 4, 1992, the last day of the season, he started the only game of his career at shortstop to allow Willie Randolph, a longtime star for the crosstown Yankees, to play his final career game at second base.

=== Cleveland Indians (1996) ===
In a deal made on July 29 before the 1996 trade deadline, the Mets sent Kent and José Vizcaíno to the Cleveland Indians for Álvaro Espinoza and Carlos Baerga. He hit .265 in 39 games, helping the Indians to the best record in the major leagues, but the team was upset in the American League Division Series by the Orioles, with Kent picking up just one hit in four games.

=== San Francisco Giants (1997–2002) ===
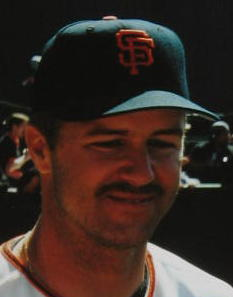
Kent during his tenure with the Giants

After the 1996 season, Kent was again traded, this time to the San Francisco Giants along with José Vizcaíno and Julián Tavárez. The San Francisco trade was initially very unpopular, because it sent Matt Williams, a longtime Giant and a fan favorite, to the Indians. (Kent eventually finished his major league career with 377 home runs, one behind Williams.) Brian Sabean, in his first year as general manager of the Giants, was so widely criticized for the move that he famously defended himself to the media by saying, "I am not an idiot." Approaching his 29th birthday, Kent had less than 600 hits in the major leagues, with only 78 home runs and 318 RBI.

But Kent's career took off in San Francisco, starting in 1997. Immediately inserted in the line-up behind superstar Barry Bonds, and with the confidence of manager Dusty Baker, Kent finally rose to his full potential, hitting .250 with 29 home runs and 121 RBI. The Giants won their first division title in eight years, but were swept in the Division Series by the Florida Marlins, with a pair of home runs by Kent providing the only Giants runs in a 6-2 loss in the finale. He was consistently among the top RBI hitters in the league over his next five seasons with the Giants, amassing 689 RBI over six years; he also won the 1998 Willie Mac Award for his spirit and leadership. On Opening Day in 1998 he had a career-high five hits in a 9-4, 13-inning road win against the Astros, including a three-run home run and an RBI double in the final frame. On July 24 he drove in a career-high seven runs with two home runs including a grand slam in a 12-2 win over the Cincinnati Reds.

On May 3, 1999, playing atypically at first base, he again collected five hits, hitting for the cycle in a road game against the Pittsburgh Pirates, though Pittsburgh scored three runs with two out in the ninth inning to win 9-8. On June 12 he had another five hits including a three-run home run in a 15-11 road win over the Seattle Mariners; shortly afterward, he was named to the All-Star team for the first time, and played the All-Star Game's second half, although he grounded into a double play to end the contest. On June 4, 2000 he had a pair of home runs and a pair of doubles for a career-high 12 total bases as the Giants walloped their cross-bay rival Oakland Athletics 18-2 in a road game. Kent's contributions were recognized that year (33 home runs, 125 RBI, .334 batting average, and a .986 fielding percentage) with the National League MVP Award, beating out teammate and perennial MVP candidate Bonds. Despite Bonds overshadowing Kent in almost every offensive category, it was Kent's clutch hitting in RBI spots that won many games for the Giants that year, and ultimately won him the award. The Giants had the major leagues' best record at 97–65, but lost to the Mets in the National League Division Series 3–1, although Kent had hits in all four games.

On May 1, 2001 he again had seven RBI in an 11-6 road win over the Pirates, with a three-run home run and two RBI doubles, one with the bases loaded. On May 13 he hit his 200th home run in a 6-3 win over the Mets. He ended the season with 390 assists at second base, leading the league for the only time in his career, edging the Astros' Craig Biggio by one assist.

"Some guys play not to get hurt, and they're never really as good as they can be. That's not the way I play."

— Jeff Kent

In 2002, Kent had another stellar year for a second baseman (37 home runs, 108 RBI, .313 batting average), leading the NL with 81 extra-base hits, and also leading the league in double plays for the only time with a career-high 113. On September 9 he reached 1,000 RBI with a sacrifice fly in a 6-5 win over the Dodgers. The combination of Kent and MVP winner Bonds propelled the Giants to a 95–66 record, good enough for the NL Wild Card. The Giants beat the Atlanta Braves in the Division Series 3–2 and the St. Louis Cardinals in the NL Championship Series 4–1. With San Francisco in the World Series for the first time since 1989, Kent had a pair of two-run home runs in a 16-4 blowout in Game 5 to take a 3-2 Series lead. The Giants nearly clinched the championship (failing to hold a 5–0, 7th-inning lead) in the sixth game, before falling to the Anaheim Angels in seven games. Despite the team's success that season, Kent's relationship with the Giants had soured. The Giants front office had lost confidence in him after an incident during spring training left him with a broken wrist. Kent had initially claimed that he had broken his wrist after slipping and falling while washing his truck; ensuing media reports indicated that, in reality, he had crashed his motorcycle while performing wheelies and other stunts, in direct violation of his contract. In addition, the growing tension between Kent and Bonds, which had been developing for years, finally boiled over: a midseason fight in the Giants dugout was widely reported in 2002 and caught on television. The feud between the two was so bad that, at the end of the season, San Francisco Chronicle beat reporter Ray Ratto said of the two, "The one who lives longer will attend the other's funeral, just to make sure he's dead." The departure of manager Dusty Baker also factored into Kent's eventual decision to leave the Giants.

=== Houston Astros (2003–2004) ===
During the 2002 offseason, Kent signed a two-year, $19.9 million deal with the Houston Astros, citing his desire to be closer to his family's Texas ranch. Kent turned one of the outs and collected an assist during a triple play on August 19, 2004, against the Philadelphia Phillies, when Todd Pratt grounded out with the bases loaded in the fifth inning. Kent forced Marlon Byrd out at second base before throwing Pratt out at first base; it was Houston's first triple play in 13 years.

From May 14 to June 11, he collected a hit in 25 straight games, the longest streak in the league that season, and set a new franchise record; Willy Taveras topped his mark in 2006. On September 29, 2004, he hit his 300th home run in a 6-4 win over the Cardinals. Three days later, he hit a pair of home runs in a 9-3 win over the Colorado Rockies to give him 278 as a second baseman, surpassing Ryne Sandberg as the all-time leader at that position. In Game 5 of the NL Championship Series, Kent hit a three-run walk-off home run in the bottom of the ninth to break a scoreless tie and put Houston ahead of the St. Louis Cardinals three games to two in the series. However, the Cardinals would win Games 6 and 7 in St. Louis to capture the pennant.

=== Los Angeles Dodgers (2005–2008) ===
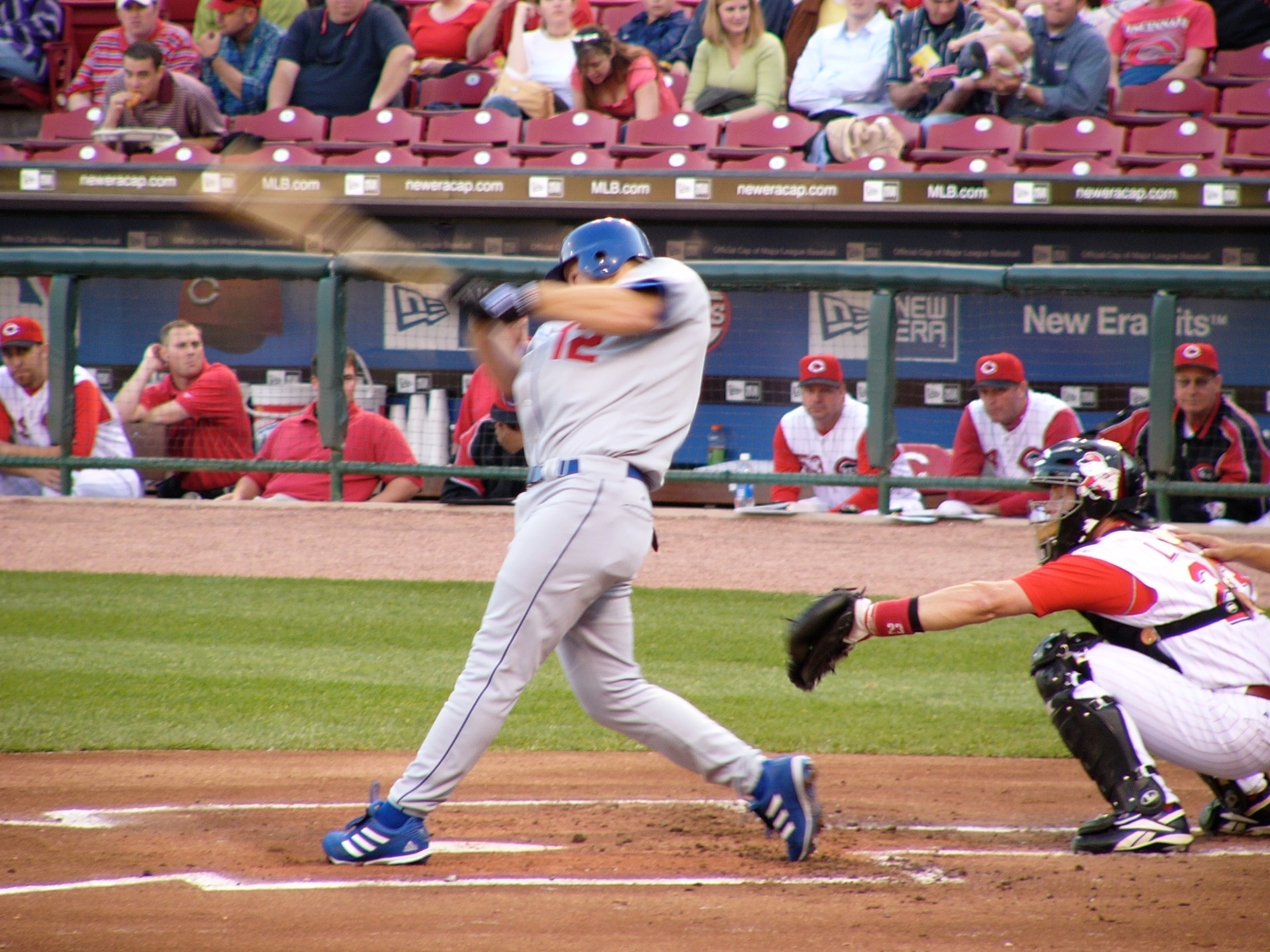
Kent at bat with the Dodgers in 2005

On December 14, 2004, Kent signed a $21 million contract for three years with his hometown Los Angeles Dodgers. On July 8, 2005 he picked up his 2,000th career hit, an RBI single off Roger Clemens in a 3-2 road loss to the Astros. Four days later, he started at second base for the National League in the All-Star Game at Comerica Park, his fifth career All-Star selection and fourth All-Star start. Kent became the first player in the history of the Dodgers–Giants rivalry to make and start the Midsummer Classic for both clubs. (Joc Pederson has since done the same.) Kent had a good 2005 season, leading the Dodgers in batting average, on-base percentage, slugging percentage, runs, hits, doubles, home runs and RBI (.289, .377, .512, 100, 160, 36, 29, and 105 respectively). After the 2005 season, Kent signed an extension that would take him to the 2008 season.

But he was clearly slowing down; he made two trips to the disabled list in the 2006 season because of a hand sprain and an oblique injury, but came back late in the season and helped the Dodgers reach the postseason. On September 27 he hit his 500th double to drive in the last run in a 6-4 road win over the Rockies. The Dodgers were swept by the Mets in the Division Series, though Kent banged out eight hits in three games, with four including a home run and a double in the final game. He batted .302 in 2007, but also led the league in errors for the fourth time. On July 19, 2008, he picked up his 1,500th RBI with a 9th-inning home run in a 3-2 road loss to the Arizona Diamondbacks, joining Nap Lajoie and Rogers Hornsby to become the third second baseman to reach the milestone. Four days later, he became the twelfth player in major league history to play 2,000 games at second base, in a 5-3 road loss to the Rockies. He ended his final season with a road series against the Giants on the last weekend of the campaign, getting his last home run in a 6-5, 10-inning loss, and his last hit in a 2-1 win. He finished his career on October 15 in Game 5 of the 2008 NLCS, when he struck out looking against Cole Hamels to end the 7th inning, going hitless in 9 at bats in the postseason. Kent announced his retirement from baseball on January 22, 2009.

=== Career statistics ===
In 2,298 games over 17 seasons, Kent posted a .290 batting average (2,461-for-8,498) with 1320 runs, 560 doubles, 47 triples, 377 home runs, 1518 RBI, 94 stolen bases, 801 walks, a .356 on-base percentage and a .500 slugging percentage. He finished his career with a .978 fielding percentage. In 49 postseason games, he hit .276 (47-for-170) with 25 runs, 11 doubles, 9 home runs, 23 RBI, and 13 walks. Kent hit 351 home runs as a second baseman, the most in major league history; only Robinson Cano has since hit 300 home runs as a second baseman.

== Post-playing career ==
Jeff Kent's number 21 was retired by the San Francisco Giants in 2026.

Kent and his wife Dana reside near Austin, Texas, where they raise their four children, a daughter and three sons. He also owns the 4,000-acre (1,600 ha) "Diamond K" cattle ranch near Tilden, Texas. In 2008, Kent purchased the Lakecliff Country Club in Spicewood, Texas. Kent also owns Kent Powersports, a chain of motorcycle and ATV dealerships.

Kent appeared as a contestant on the summer 2009 television series Superstars, where he was teamed with actress Ali Landry in a series of sports competitions. They finished in fifth place in the competition. In 2012, Kent participated in Survivor: Philippines, the 25th season of the American CBS competitive reality television series Survivor. He was the eighth contestant voted off, which placed him tenth and made him the second member of the jury, giving him a right to vote for the eventual winner at the Final Tribal Council. When he was voted off, Kent claimed that the million dollar prize was "six hundred grand by the time Obama takes it".

He has been an advocate for Major League Baseball using blood tests for HGH. Since 2011, Kent has served as a spring training instructor for the San Francisco Giants. He also coaches his sons' Little League teams, and in 2014 he became a volunteer assistant for Southwestern University's baseball team. In 2011, Kent donated $100,000 and raised awareness to help reinstate the Cal baseball program, which was being cut for cost-saving purposes. In 2014, Kent announced the creation of the Jeff Kent Women Driven Scholarship Endowment to provide a full scholarship each year to one female student-athlete at UC Berkeley in perpetuity.

In 2008, Kent donated to the campaign to ban same-sex marriage in California.

=== National Baseball Hall of Fame ===
Eligible for the National Baseball Hall of Fame for the first time in 2014, Baseball Writers' Association of America (BBWAA) voters gave Kent just 15.2% of their votes in his first year, well short of the 75% required for induction. Among 17 returnees to the ballot in 2015, Kent was one of only three who saw a decrease in support, dropping to 14.0%. His support increased in subsequent elections, reaching 32.7% in 2022, his ninth appearance on the ballot. In 2023, his tenth and final appearance on the BBWAA ballot, he received 46.5%, falling short of the necessary threshold. Kent's underperformance relative to his offensive prowess has been attributed to unremarkable defense, the tainted era in which he played, and his reputation as a negative presence in the locker room.

Kent was elected to the Hall of Fame by the Contemporary Baseball Era committee as part of 2026 Baseball Hall of Fame balloting on December 7, 2025.

== Personal life ==
Kent and his wife, Dana, are members of the Church of Jesus Christ of Latter-day Saints. His daughter, Lauren, and his eldest son, Hunter, both attended Brigham Young University (BYU) in Provo, Utah. Lauren graduated from BYU in December 2017, and Hunter played on the practice squad for the Cougars, before taking leave to serve a two-year mission in Mexico.

Kent's son, Colton, played his prep baseball at Lake Travis High School in Austin, Texas. Colton signed to play college baseball at BYU, but transferred to the College of Southern Idaho (CSI) after a year at BYU.

Kent's other son, Kaeden, is also a professional baseball player.

== Accomplishments ==
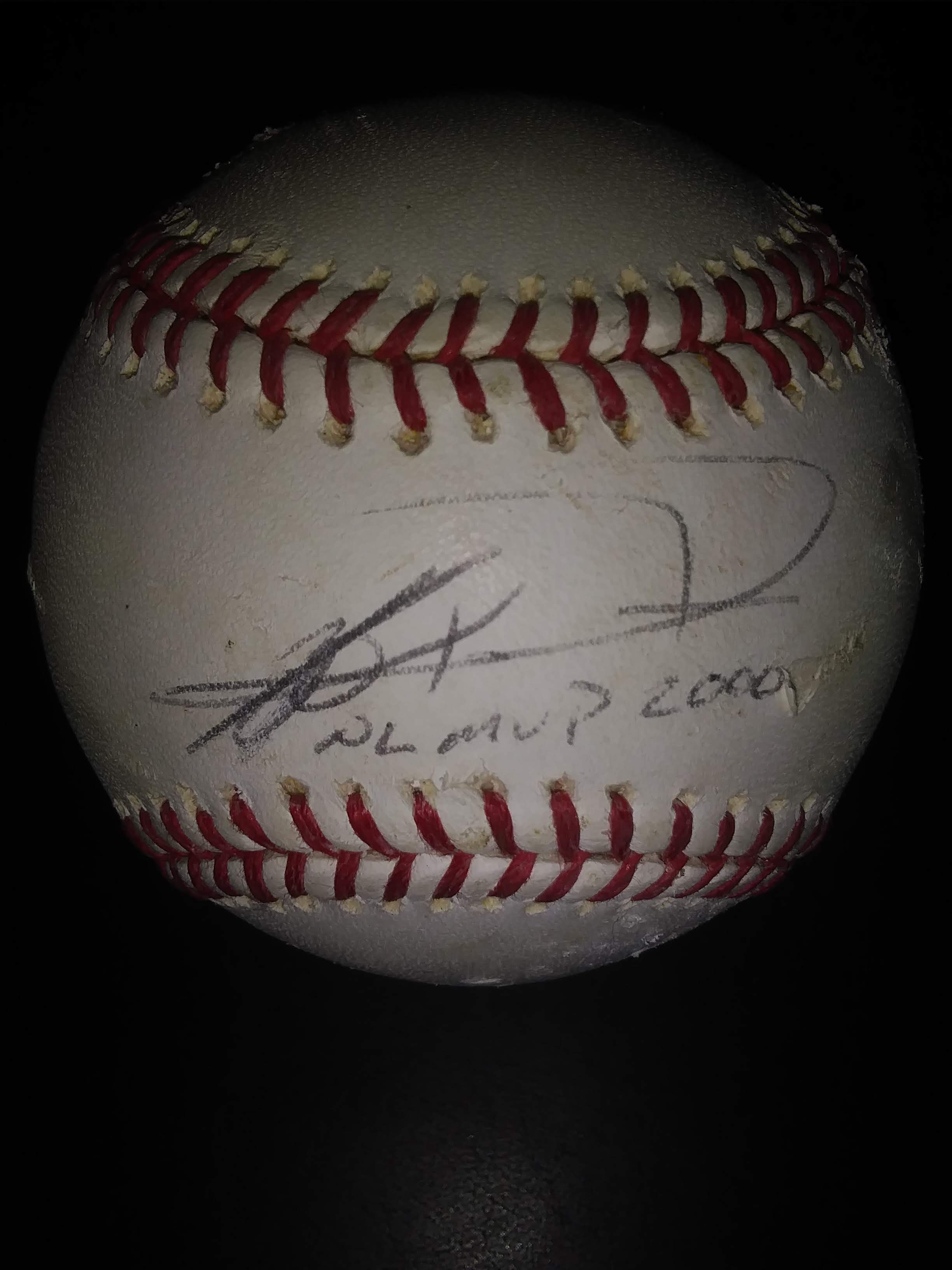
Jeff Kent MVP 2000 autographed baseball

- Five-time All-Star (1999–2001, 2004–05)
- Four-time Silver Slugger (2000–2002, 2005)
- National League MVP (2000)
- Finished 8th in National League MVP voting (1997)
- Finished 9th in National League MVP voting (1998)
- Finished 6th in National League MVP voting (2002)
- Finished Top-5 in RBIs (1997, 1998, 2000)
- All-time leader in home runs among second basemen (377)
- Only second baseman to have 100 or more RBIs in six consecutive seasons (1997–2002)
- Hit for the cycle (1999)

== See also ==
- List of Major League Baseball career home run leaders
- List of Major League Baseball career hits leaders
- List of Major League Baseball career doubles leaders
- List of Major League Baseball career runs scored leaders
- List of Major League Baseball career runs batted in leaders
- List of Major League Baseball career total bases leaders
- List of Major League Baseball players who hit for the cycle

Awards and achievements
Preceded by Vladimir Guerrero; Todd Helton; Todd Helton	National League Player of the Month; August 1998; June 2000; June 2002	Succeeded by Mark McGwire; Sammy Sosa; Larry Walker
Preceded by Tony Eusebio	Houston Astros longest hitting streak 2004—2006	Succeeded by Willy Taveras
Preceded by Neifi Pérez	Hitting for the cycle May 3, 1999	Succeeded by Todd Helton
