= Nelson Cruz =

Dominican baseball player (born 1980)

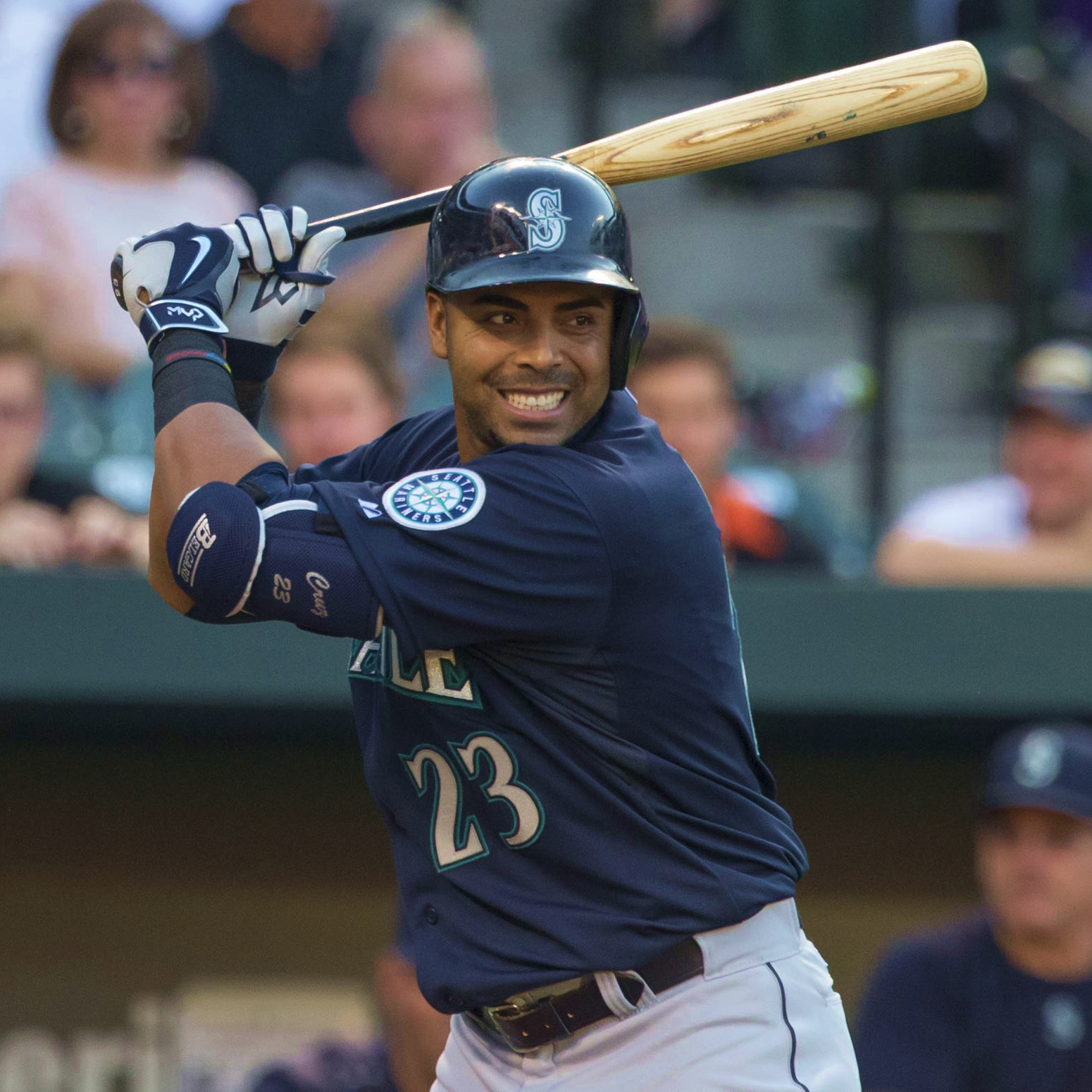
- Cruz with the Seattle Mariners in 2015
- Designated hitter / Right fielder
- Born: July 1, 1980 (age 46); Las Matas de Santa Cruz, Dominican Republic
- Batted: Right Threw: Right

MLB debut
- September 17, 2005, for the Milwaukee Brewers

Last MLB appearance
- July 3, 2023, for the San Diego Padres

MLB statistics
- Batting average: .274
- Hits: 2,053
- Home runs: 464
- Runs batted in: 1,325
- Stats at Baseball Reference

Teams
- Milwaukee Brewers (2005); Texas Rangers (2006–2013); Baltimore Orioles (2014); Seattle Mariners (2015–2018); Minnesota Twins (2019–2021); Tampa Bay Rays (2021); Washington Nationals (2022); San Diego Padres (2023)

Career highlights and awards
- 7× All-Star (2009, 2013–2015, 2017, 2018, 2021); All-MLB First Team (2019); ALCS MVP (2011); 4× Silver Slugger Award (2015, 2017, 2019, 2020); Roberto Clemente Award (2021); MLB home run leader (2014); AL RBI leader (2017)
Medals
Men's baseball
Representing Dominican Republic
World Baseball Classic
Gold medal – first place	2013 San Francisco	Team

Nelson Ramón Cruz Martínez (born July 1, 1980), nicknamed "Boomstick", is a Dominican-American former professional baseball designated hitter and right fielder. He played in Major League Baseball (MLB) for the Milwaukee Brewers, Texas Rangers, Baltimore Orioles, Seattle Mariners, Minnesota Twins, Tampa Bay Rays, Washington Nationals, and San Diego Padres. Cruz is a seven-time MLB All-Star. Known for his power hitting, he won four Silver Slugger Awards and two Edgar Martínez Awards.

After signing with the New York Mets organization in 1998, Cruz played his first major league game in 2005 with the Brewers. He had a breakthrough season in 2009, hitting 33 home runs for the Rangers. Cruz played for the Rangers in the World Series in 2010 and 2011, and was named the Most Valuable Player of the 2011 American League (AL) Championship Series. On August 5, 2013, Cruz was suspended for 50 games by MLB for his involvement in the Biogenesis baseball scandal. In 2014, Cruz led MLB with 40 home runs as a member of the Orioles. He led the AL with 119 RBIs in 2017 while playing for the Mariners. Cruz hit 346 home runs during the 2010s, the most hit by any player in that decade.

In 2020, based on his work in the community, Cruz was selected as the Marvin Miller Man of the Year and the Muhammad Ali Sports Humanitarian Award winner. He received the Roberto Clemente Award in 2021. After his playing career, he has worked in an advisory role for MLB and the Los Angeles Dodgers.

== Early life ==
Cruz was born on July 1, 1980, in Las Matas de Santa Cruz, Dominican Republic. His father, Nelson Cruz Sr., also played professional baseball in the Dominican Republic. Both his parents are educators, and they raised Cruz and his two sisters, Nelsy and Olga.

Growing up, Cruz's passion was for basketball, not baseball. His idol was Michael Jordan, and as a teenager Cruz played for the Dominican Republic Junior National Basketball Team. He attended the high school where his father taught history. In addition to playing sports, Cruz worked as a mechanic's helper with his uncle at a tractor factory. He also shined shoes and learned how to repair them.

After several seasons in Major League Baseball, in September 2012, Cruz donated $20,000 to help buy a fire truck for Las Matas de Santa Cruz, enlisting AMR's help in also donating two ambulances.

== Professional career ==
=== Minor leagues ===
On February 17, 1998, Cruz signed with the New York Mets organization as a non-drafted international free agent. He played for three years in the Dominican Summer League.

On August 30, 2000, the Mets traded Cruz to the Oakland Athletics in exchange for shortstop Jorge Velandia, as starting shortstop Rey Ordóñez was out with a broken arm, and Melvin Mora, Mike Bordick, and Kurt Abbott proved unable to fill in. Cruz spent the 2001 season with the AZL Athletics, slashing .250/.283/.409 with 3 home runs and 16 RBI in 23 games. The following season, he played for the Low-A Vancouver Canadians, batting .276/.316/.397 with 4 home runs and 25 RBI. Cruz spent 2003 in Single-A with the Kane County Cougars and hit .238/.292/.430 career-highs in home runs (20) and RBI (85). Cruz split the 2004 season between the High-A Modesto A's, Double-A Midland RockHounds, and Triple-A Sacramento River Cats and set new career-highs in home runs (26) and RBI (100), batting .326/.390/.562 in 137 games between the three teams.

=== Milwaukee Brewers (2005) ===
On December 16, 2004, Cruz was traded to the Milwaukee Brewers in exchange for infielder Keith Ginter. Cruz was assigned to the Double-A Huntsville Stars to begin the 2005 season before receiving a promotion to the Triple-A Nashville Sounds.

Cruz made his major league debut with the Brewers on September 17, 2005, as a late inning defensive replacement at right field, wearing #8 against the Houston Astros. He had one hit in five at bats for the Brewers in limited action. His first MLB hit was a double off Aaron Harang of the Cincinnati Reds on September 28. Cruz returned to Nashville to begin the 2006 season and hit .302/.378/.528 in 102 games with the team.

=== Texas Rangers (2006–2013) ===
On July 28, 2006, the Brewers sent Cruz and outfielder Carlos Lee to the Texas Rangers in exchange for Laynce Nix, Kevin Mench, Francisco Cordero, and minor league pitcher Julian Cordero. Cruz wore #17 during his time with Texas. He hit his first MLB home run on July 31 against Willie Eyre of the Twins. On August 16, Cruz hit the first MLB grand slam off of Kevin Gregg of the Angels. On September 4, against the Athletics, he hit an inside-the-park home run, with his bat breaking during the swing and Jay Payton failing to catch the weakly hit ball.

Cruz made the Rangers Opening Day roster in 2007. He hit his first career walk-off home run on Mother's Day against Scot Shields of the Los Angeles Angels of Anaheim. He was sent down to Triple-A from June 5 to July 27.

Cruz failed to make the major league roster prior to the 2008 season and cleared waivers after being designated for assignment because he had exhausted his minor league options. With the Triple-A Oklahoma RedHawks, Cruz had a .341 batting average and had 37 home runs and 100 runs batted in (RBI); for his efforts, Cruz won the Pacific Coast League MVP Award. During his time with the Redhawks, Cruz began using an open batting stance, which helped him see the ball better and become a more productive hitter. On August 25, the Rangers purchased Cruz's contract from the RedHawks.

==== 2009–2011: Breakout and postseason heroics ====
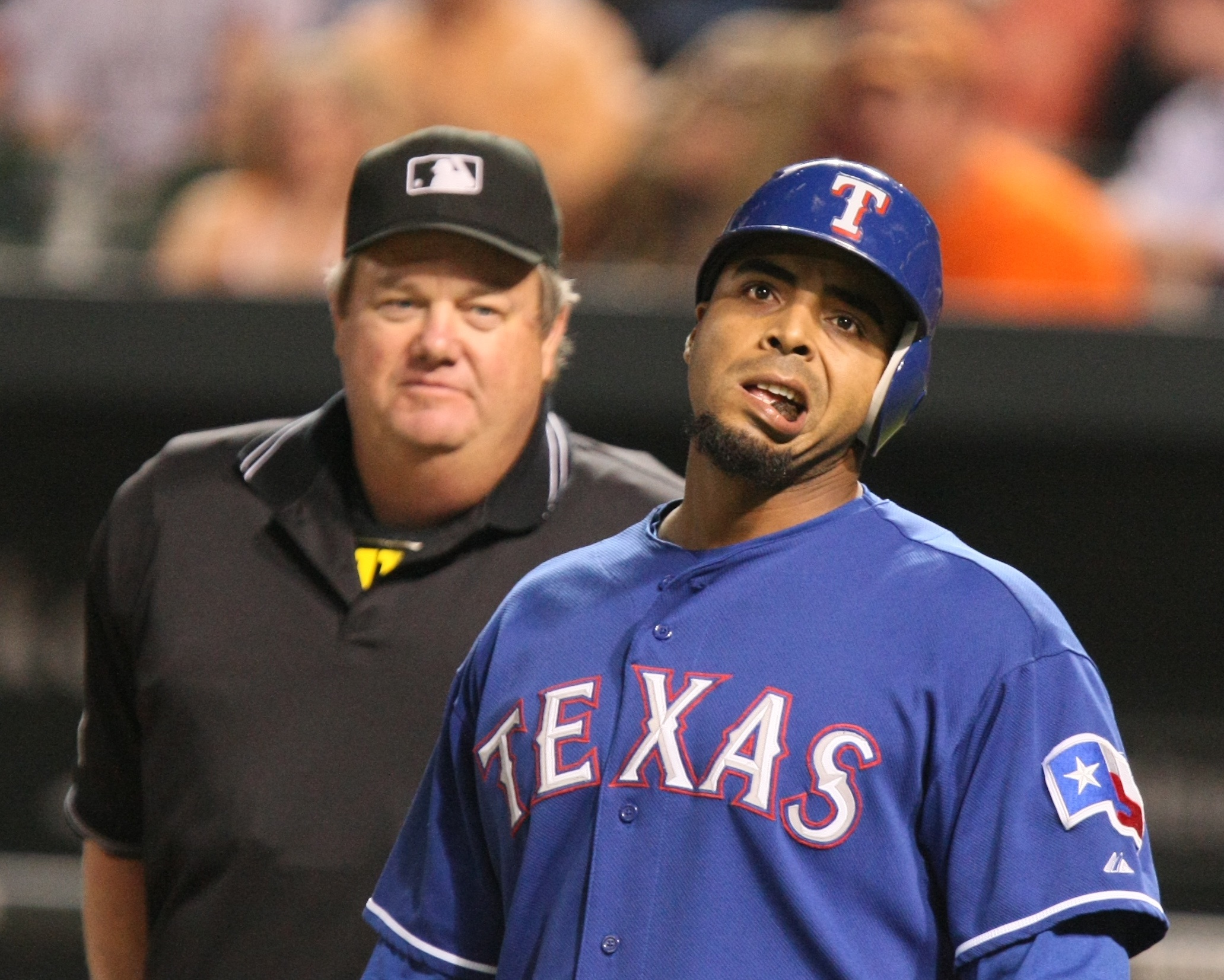
Cruz (right) with the Rangers in 2009

Cruz had a breakthrough season in 2009. In July, he was selected as an All-Star as a replacement for injured Torii Hunter. He also participated in the Home Run Derby, finishing second to Brewers first baseman Prince Fielder. Cruz finished the season with 33 home runs.

Cruz and teammate Ian Kinsler each hit three home runs in the 2010 American League Division Series (ALDS) against the Tampa Bay Rays, marking only the second time in major league history that two teammates each hit three homers in a postseason series of five games or fewer (joining Babe Ruth and Lou Gehrig, who did it in the 1928 World Series). In Game 5 of the World Series against the San Francisco Giants, Cruz hit a home run off of Tim Lincecum in the 7th inning. It was around this time that Cruz began to refer to his baseball bat as a "boomstick."

In 2011, Cruz and Kinsler became the first two teammates in major league history to homer in each of the first three games in a season, joining Dean Palmer (1992) as the only Texas ballplayers to ever homer in the first three games of the season. In his very next game, Cruz became the third player ever to homer in each of the first four games of the season, joining Willie Mays and Mark McGwire. Cruz became the second hitter to hit a home run into the upper deck in right field as a right-handed batter in the history of Rangers Ballpark in Arlington. The other was hit by former Ranger Chad Curtis in 2000 season. On July 22, he had 8 RBIs in a game against the Toronto Blue Jays; it was Cruz's career high in RBIs. In 2011, Cruz batted .263 with 29 home runs. He led American League (AL) right fielders in range factor for the third straight year (2.29).

On October 10, Cruz hit a walk-off grand slam in Game 2 of the AL Championship Series (ALCS) versus the Detroit Tigers. He became the first player in baseball history to hit a walk-off grand slam in a postseason game. Cruz hit a three-run home run to seal Game 4 of the ALCS for the Rangers against the Tigers. He became the first player to hit multiple extra-inning home runs in the same postseason series. During the ALCS, Cruz hit six home runs and had 13 RBIs, both postseason series records at the time. His efforts earned him the ALCS MVP award.

Cruz hit a solo home run to put the Rangers up 6–4 against the St. Louis Cardinals in Game 6 of the World Series. With that home run, Cruz tied the record for most postseason home runs in a season at 8; he shared the achievement with Carlos Beltrán and Barry Bonds before Randy Arozarena broke the record with 10 homers in 2020. In the ninth inning, Cruz missed a fly ball that would have clinched the Rangers' first championship; instead, the Cardinals came back to win that game and Game 7 to win the World Series.

==== Biogenesis scandal ====
In January 2013, Cruz was linked to buying performance-enhancing drugs from the Biogenesis clinic in Miami. On August 5, 2013, MLB suspended Cruz for 50 games for his involvement in the Biogenesis scandal. Cruz accepted the suspension and said in a statement that from November 2011 to January 2012, he had an undiagnosed "serious gastrointestinal infection, helicobacter pylori," that went undiagnosed for over a month. Tony Bosch, the head of Biogenesis, said he sold $4,000 of product to Cruz, whom he nicknamed "Mohamad." Cruz was one of 13 players who were disciplined for their connection to the anti-aging clinic.

Cruz became a free agent following the 2013 season, turning down a $14 million qualifying offer from the Rangers. The fact that he had draft pick compensation attached to him and lingering concerns over his recent PED suspension made it difficult for him to find a new deal during the offseason.

=== Baltimore Orioles (2014) ===
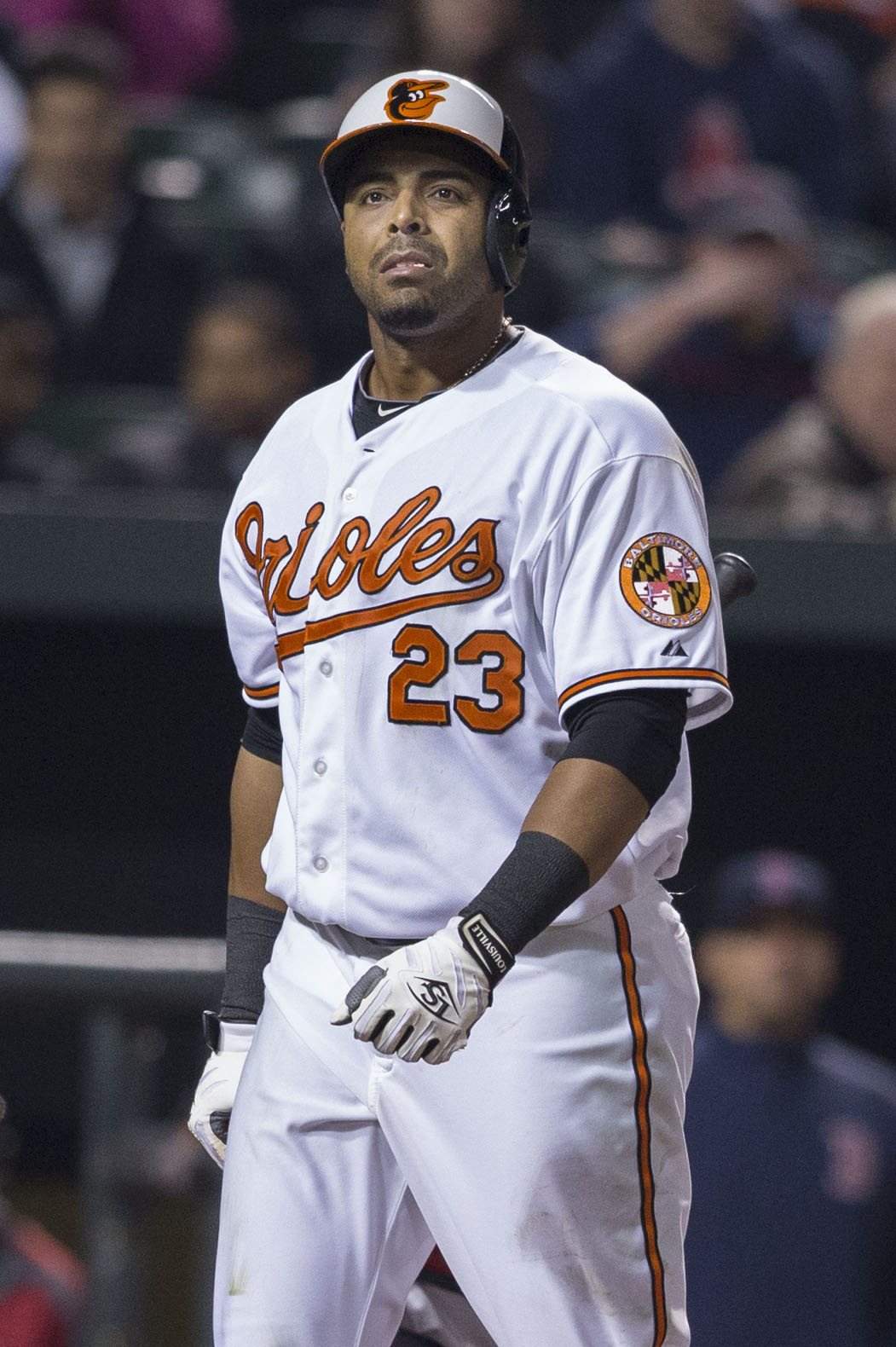
Cruz with the Orioles in 2014

On February 24, 2014, Cruz signed a one-year, $8 million, contract with the Baltimore Orioles. Cruz wore #23 with the Orioles and continued wearing 23 in his stops with the Seattle Mariners, Minnesota Twins, Tampa Bay Rays, and San Diego Padres.

On July 5, Cruz had his first career 5-hit game, with two singles, two doubles, and a home run, falling a triple shy of the cycle (he was tagged out just short of third base), against the Red Sox. He was elected into his third MLB All-Star Game, as a designated hitter, for the AL. On September 7, in a game against the Tampa Bay Rays, Cruz went 4-for-5 with two home runs and 7 RBIs, including his 100th RBI of the season. His previous season high in RBIs had been 90, set in 2012. Cruz drove in all 7 runs the Orioles scored. In 159 games played in 2014, Cruz had an MLB-leading 40 home runs along with a .271 batting average, 32 doubles, and 108 RBI.

In the first game of the ALDS, Cruz homered against the Detroit Tigers' Max Scherzer. It was his 15th home run in 35 career postseason games, tying Cruz for 10th place on the all-time postseason home run list with Babe Ruth. In the third game of the ALDS, Cruz hit his 16th postseason home run against the Tigers' David Price, tying him for ninth place on the all-time postseason home run list with Carlos Beltrán. Cruz elected free agency after rejecting the Orioles' qualifying offer of $15.3 million.

=== Seattle Mariners (2015–2018) ===
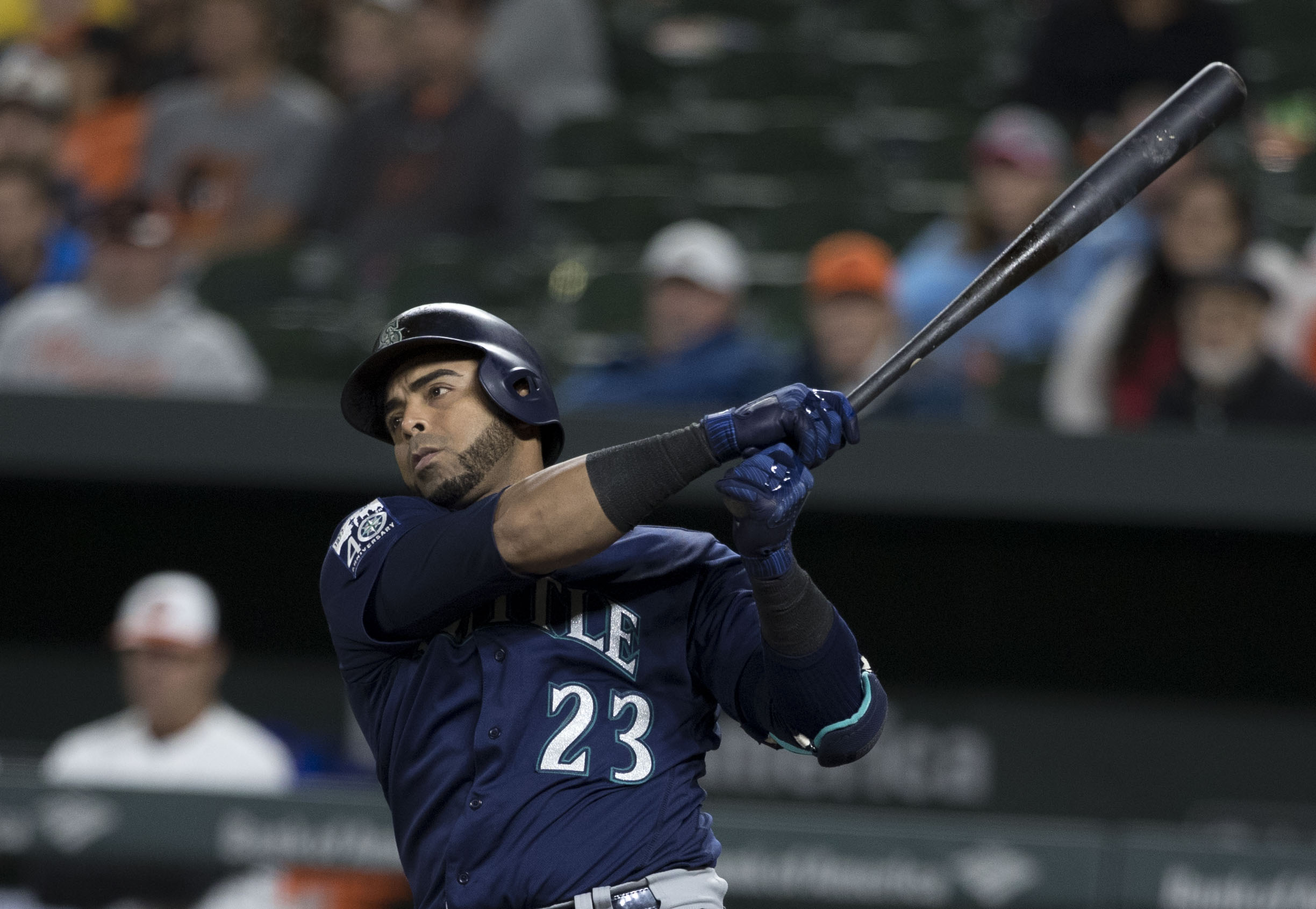
Cruz with the Mariners in 2017

On December 4, 2014, Cruz signed a four-year contract with the Seattle Mariners worth $57 million.

Cruz was named the starting DH for the AL All-Star team, marking the fourth time (third consecutive) that he was named an All-Star. He went on to have arguably the best season of his career, hitting .302 with a career-high 44 home runs and 93 RBIs. He also won his first Silver Slugger Award and finished sixth in the AL MVP voting.

In 2016, Cruz batted .287 with 43 home runs and 104 RBIs. While not an All-Star, he finished 15th in the AL MVP voting. His batted balls had the fastest average exit velocity of the season in the majors, at 94.6 miles per hour.

Cruz was selected as an All-Star in 2017 for the fifth time in his career. On July 7, he hit his 300th career home run in a Mariners win over the Oakland Athletics. Cruz led the AL in RBIs with 119 and led the Mariners in home runs (39), runs scored (91), extra base hits (67), walks (70), OPS (.924), on-base percentage (OBP) (.375), and slugging percentage (.549). He won the Edgar Martínez Award as the best DH in the majors.

Cruz was named to the 2018 All-Star Game. He batted .256 for the season, along with 37 home runs and 97 RBIs. He was the eighth-oldest player in the AL. He became a free agent after the season.

=== Minnesota Twins (2019–2021) ===
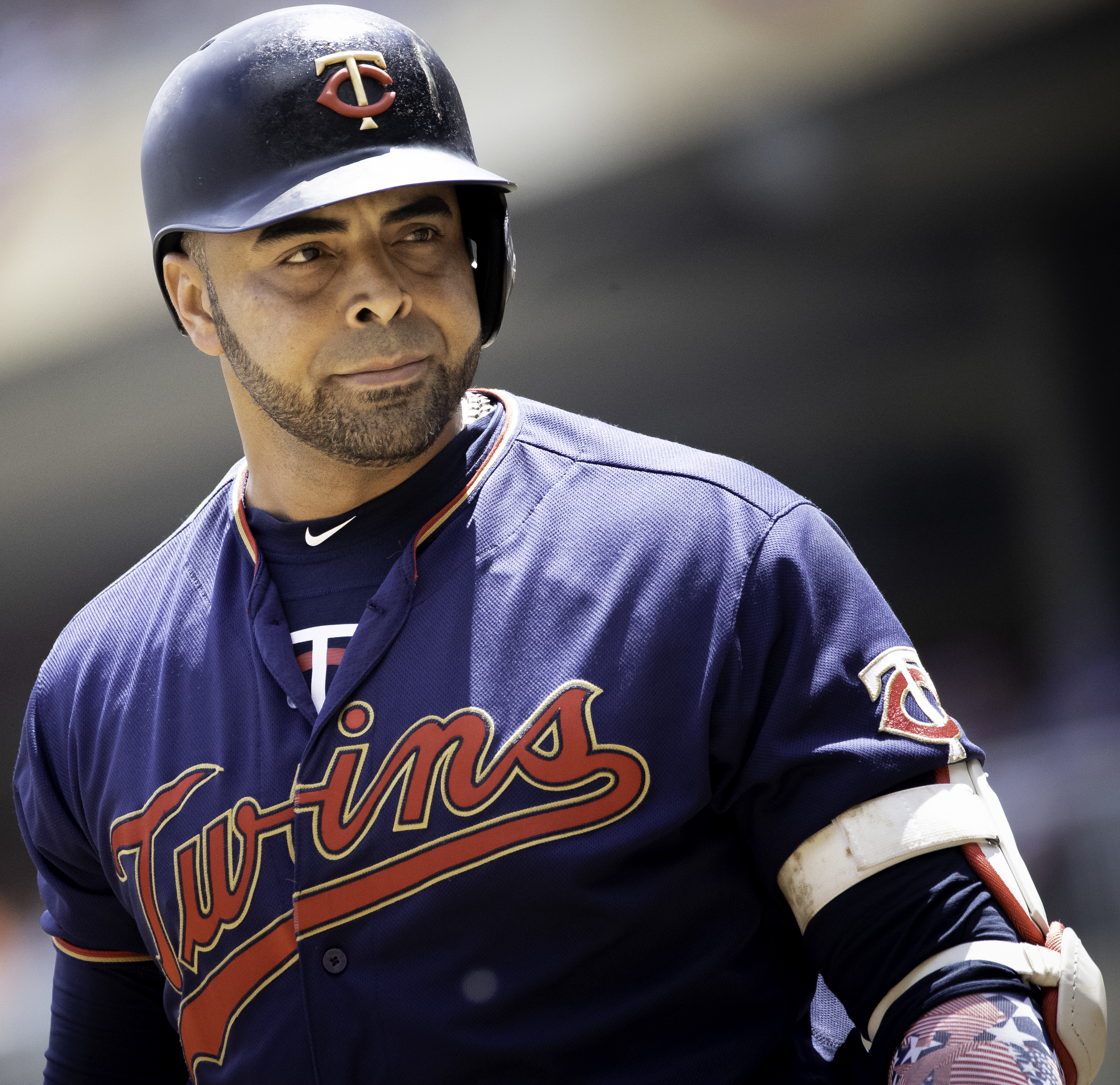
Cruz with the Twins in 2019

On January 2, 2019, Cruz signed a one-year contract with the Minnesota Twins worth $14.3 million. The contract also included a $12 million team option for the 2020 season.

On September 22, Cruz hit his 400th career home run and 40th home run of the season versus the Kansas City Royals. He batted .311/.392/.639 with 41 home runs and 108 RBI in 120 games on the season. He produced the highest hard-contact percentage of all major league batters, at 52.5%. He was the fifth-oldest player in the AL. For first time in his MLB career, he did not play in the field; he played in 114 games as a DH and another six as a pinch hitter. His 1.031 OPS matched the club record, and his home run and RBI totals set club records at DH. He ranked second in the AL in OPS and slugging percentage, tied for third in home runs, sixth in batting average, and seventh in RBI. He followed Hank Aaron and Barry Bonds as the only players to hit 40 home runs in their age-39 season or after. These accomplishments helped net Cruz his third Silver Slugger Award. Cruz also won the Edgar Martinez Award for the second time.

Cruz hit 346 home runs during the 2010s, the most hit by any player in that decade.

The Twins picked up Cruz' option for 2020, in which he batted .303 with a .992 OPS, 16 home runs, and 33 RBI. Although slowed by a sore knee later in the season, Cruz appeared in 53 of 60 games in the shortened season. He doubled twice in a span of six at bats in a season-ending AL Wild Card Series loss to the Houston Astros. He ranked third in the AL in OBP (.397), fourth in OPS, fifth in slugging perecentage (.595), tied for fifth in home runs and seventh in batting average, leading to winning the Silver Slugger Award at DH, his fourth Silver Slugger. He finished sixth in the AL MVP voting. He became a free agent after the season.

For his efforts assisting the community, Cruz was selected as the Marvin Miller Man of the Year by the MLB Players Association, as that player whom his peers deem earned "most respect based on his leadership on the field and in the community," notably in his hometown of Las Matas de Santa Cruz. He also won the ESPYs Muhammed Ali Sports Humanitarian Award in 2020. Cruz donated a police station, a fire station, replaced an aging ambulance, and spearheaded a $400,000 donation drive to help alleviate food shortages induced by the COVID-19 pandemic.

On February 10, 2021, Cruz signed a one-year, $13 million contract to stay with Minnesota for the 2021 season. Cruz was named an All-Star for the team in 2021, and hit .294/.370/.537 with 19 home runs and 50 RBI in 85 games. In 2021, The Athletic called Cruz "one of the game’s elite power hitters", and CBS Sports described him as "a steady purveyor of elite power production."

=== Tampa Bay Rays (2021) ===
On July 22, 2021, Cruz was traded to the Tampa Bay Rays alongside Calvin Faucher in exchange for Joe Ryan and Drew Strotman. His production dropped off with the Rays, batting .226/.283/.442 in 55 games. In his final postseason, he homered in Game 1 of the ALDS and batted 3-for-17 in the series, as the Rays lost to the Red Sox.

On October 28, Cruz won the Roberto Clemente Award, again honoring his philanthropy and character. He had been nominated by his teams twice previously.

=== Washington Nationals (2022) ===
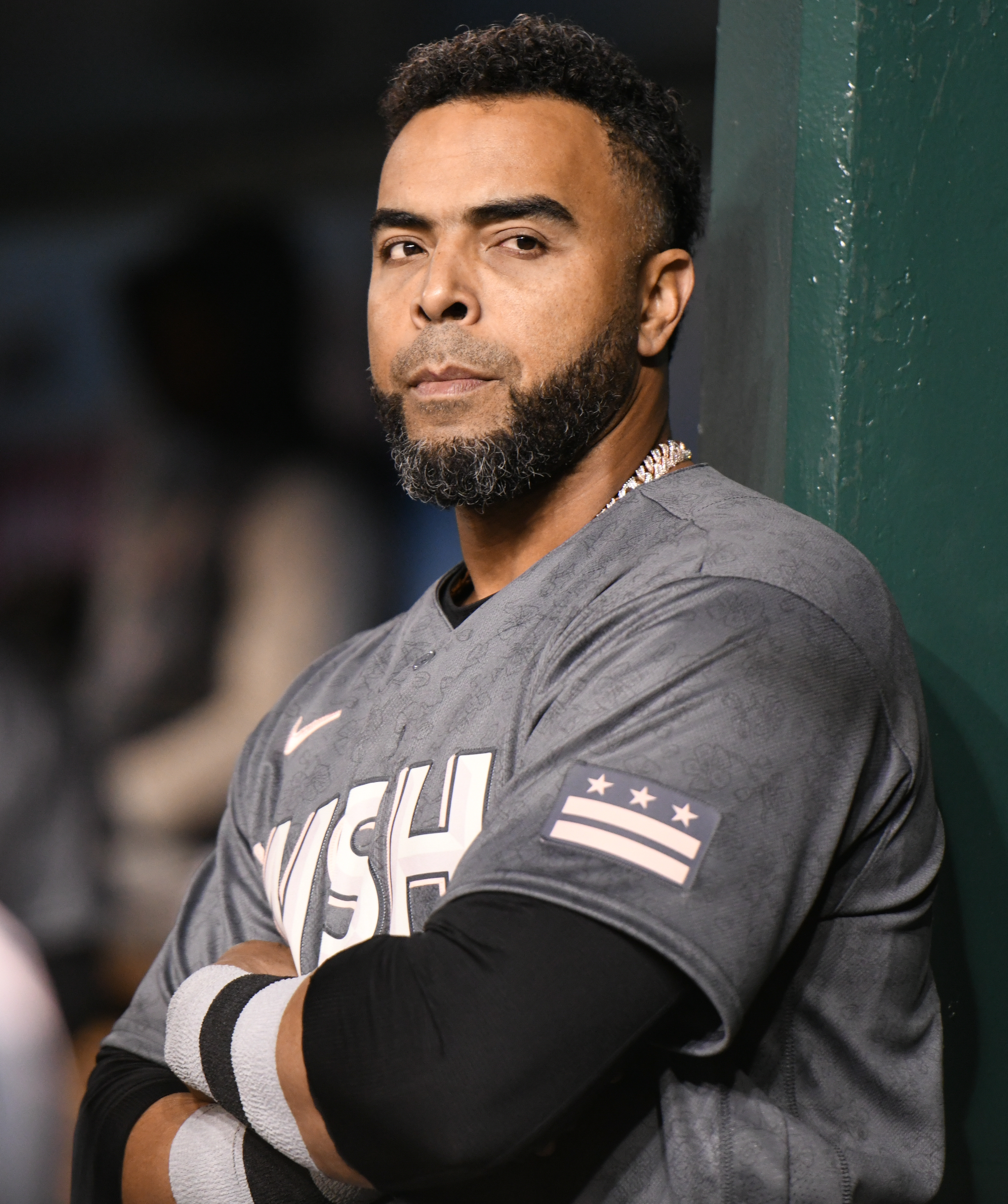
Cruz with the Nationals in 2022

On March 13, 2022, Cruz signed a one-year, $12 million contract with a mutual option for 2023 with the Washington Nationals. On August 15, Cruz went 2-for-4 against the Chicago Cubs and recorded his 2,000th career MLB hit.

Cruz ended the season batting .234/.313/.337 in 4507 plate appearances with 10 home runs and 64 RBIs in 124 games at DH, grounding into 16 double plays (ninth most in the National League). He was the oldest qualified batter in MLB. On November 7, the Nationals declined their $16 million mutual option on Cruz, making him a free agent.

=== San Diego Padres (2023) ===
On January 23, 2023, Cruz signed a one-year, $1 million contract with the San Diego Padres. He played in 49 games for the Padres, hitting .245/.283/.399 with 5 home runs and 23 RBI. He hit his 464th and final MLB home run on June 16 off Shane McClanahan of the Rays. Cruz was designated for assignment by San Diego on July 4 and released on July 10. He was the second-oldest player in MLB in his final season.

=== Retirement ===
Cruz announced his retirement from baseball on November 2, 2023. On Opening Day, March 28, 2024, he signed a one-day contract to officially retire as a Seattle Mariner.

== International career ==
Cruz played for the Dominican Republic national baseball team at the 2009 World Baseball Classic (WBC), 2013 WBC, 2017 WBC, and 2023 WBC. He also served as the team's general manager in the 2023 WBC, reprising that role for the 2026 WBC. Cruz and the Dominican Republic won the 2013 tournament, and he was named to the 2013 All-WBC team.

== Post-playing career ==
In November 2023, Cruz joined the Los Angeles Dodgers as a special assistant, working mostly out of the team's academy in the Dominican Republic.

On May 17, 2024, Major League Baseball hired Cruz as a special advisor for baseball operations, with the intent for Cruz to serve as a liaison for MLB on topics in Latin America. He continued in his role with the Dodgers.

Cruz served as the third base coach for the American League team in the 2024 All-Star Futures Game.

== Personal life ==
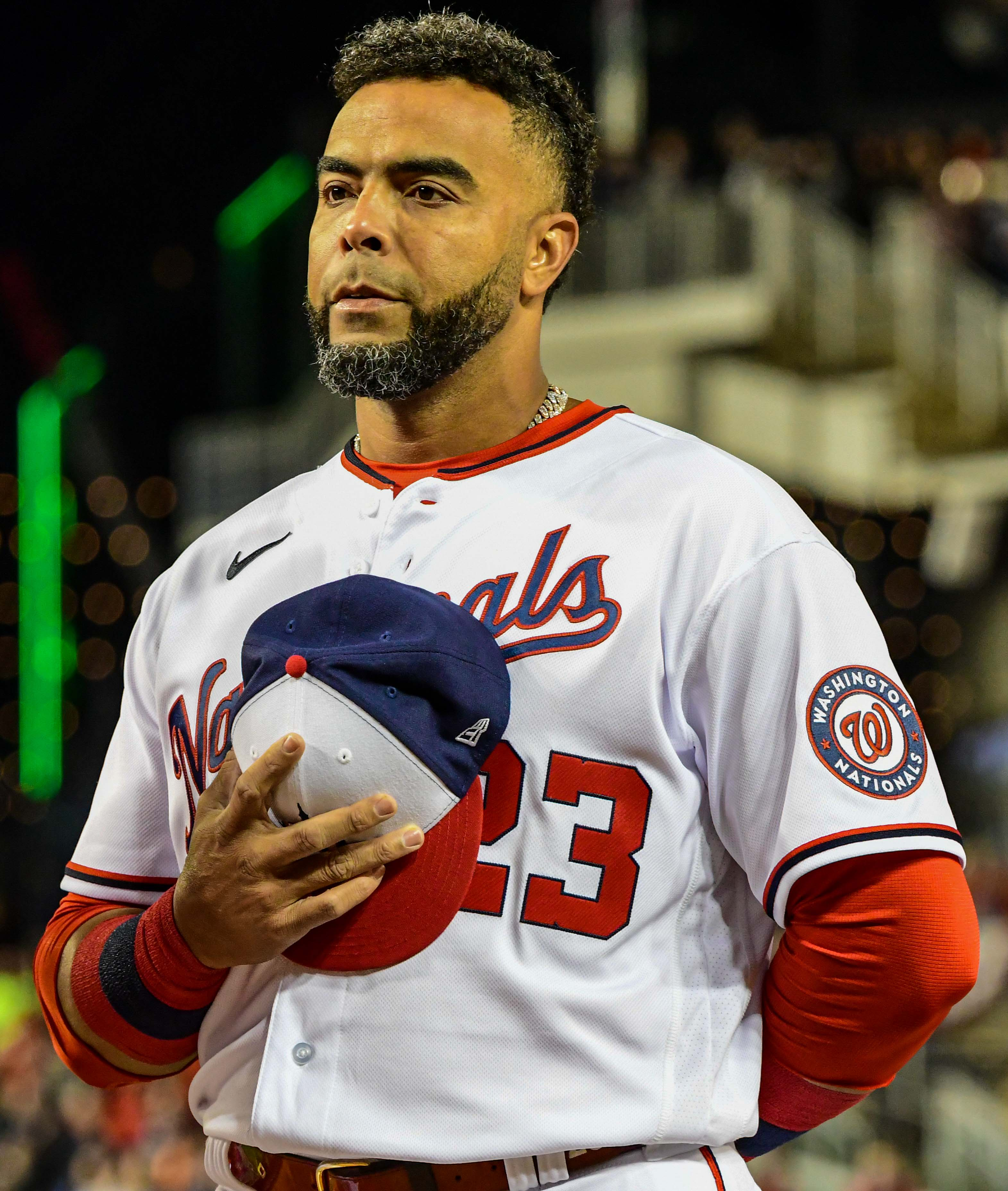
Cruz with the Nationals in 2022

Cruz has five children. He resides in his hometown of Las Matas De Santa Cruz, Dominican Republic.

After the 2018 season, Cruz became an American citizen.

On April 8, 2025, Cruz's sister Nelsy, the governor of Monte Cristi Province in the Dominican Republic, died in the Jet Set nightclub roof collapse.

On August 10, 2025, Cruz served as the grand marshal "padrino" of the 43rd National Dominican Day Parade in New York City.

== See also ==
- List of Baltimore Orioles awards
- List of Major League Baseball annual home run leaders
- List of Major League Baseball annual runs batted in leaders
- List of Major League Baseball career hits leaders
- List of Major League Baseball career home run leaders
- List of Major League Baseball career putouts as a right fielder leaders
- List of Major League Baseball career runs batted in leaders
- List of Major League Baseball career slugging percentage leaders
- List of Major League Baseball career strikeouts by batters leaders
- List of Major League Baseball career extra base hits leaders
- List of Major League Baseball players from the Dominican Republic
- Minnesota Twins award winners and league leaders
- Seattle Mariners award winners and league leaders
- Texas Rangers award winners and league leaders
