= Jet Set nightclub roof collapse =

Disaster in Santo Domingo, Dominican Republic

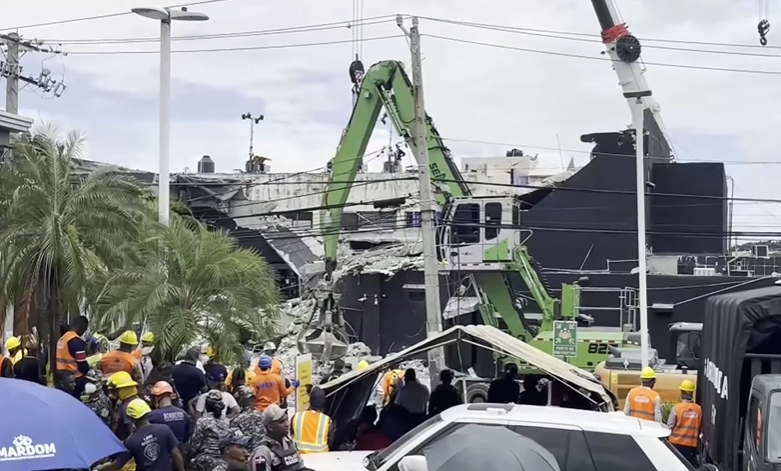
- Rescue of victims at the Jet Set nightclub
- Date: 8 April 2025
- Time: 12:44 a.m. (AST)
- Location: Ave. Independencia #2253, Atala, Santo Domingo, Dominican Republic; 18°26′33″N 69°56′33″W
- Type: Roof structural failure
- Cause: Under investigation
- Deaths: 236
- Injuries: 180+

On 8 April 2025, the roof of the Jet Set nightclub in Santo Domingo, Dominican Republic collapsed during a live performance by merengue musician Rubby Pérez. The structural failure occurred at approximately 12:44 a.m. AST, resulting in 236 fatalities and more than 180 injuries. There were approximately 515 people in the club at the time of the collapse.

It is believed to be the deadliest non-natural disaster in the country's history.

== Background ==
The building was opened as a movie theater in 1973. It was converted into a nightclub in 1994, and underwent renovations in 2010 and 2015. Featuring two-story high ceilings over an expansive, open plan dance floor, it was able to host a thousand standing and 700 seated visitors. The building was equipped with large air conditioners and water tanks on the rooftop as well as large stage lighting and loudspeakers in the ceiling.

In 2023, the generator room located north of the stage on the west side of the building caught fire after being struck by lightning, but was deemed structurally safe by firefighters. The club's owner, Antonio Espaillat, said that new plasterboard had been installed on the roof hours before the collapse, while waterproofing was done a month before.

The Jet Set nightclub played live dance music on Monday nights, which attracted well-known people. At the time of the collapse, the nightclub was hosting a concert by merengue musician Rubby Pérez, with hundreds of spectators.

== Collapse ==
According to eyewitness accounts, the roof gave way without warning roughly one hour into the musical performance. The cause of the structural failure remains undetermined, though investigators began examining the site once rescue operations permitted. A musician playing alongside Rubby Pérez said that the venue was full at the time of collapse, and that he initially believed an earthquake had occurred. First Lady of the Dominican Republic Raquel Arbaje reported that trapped governor of Monte Cristi Province Nelsy Cruz telephoned President Luis Abinader at 12:49 a.m., shortly after the collapse.

== Emergency response ==
There were approximately 515 people in the club at the time of the collapse. An extensive search and rescue mission was initiated, with about 400 responders deployed to the disaster site. First responders worked continuously to locate survivors amidst the structural debris. Rubby Pérez, who had been performing when the disaster occurred, reportedly began singing to help rescuers pinpoint his location within the rubble. According to Pérez's daughter Zulinka, who escaped from the collapse, the performer sustained injuries but remained in stable condition after he was extracted from the collapsed structure. However, he was later reported dead.

Twenty-two state agencies conducted rescue operations at the site, which included three cranes and several search dogs. During rescue operations, crowds assembled outside to pray for the victims and to sing Christian songs to help each other cope with the tragedy. A crowd gathered in front of the National Institute of Forensic Pathology, which projected images of the collapse victims to facilitate identification by loved ones. Several people who were trapped cried out for help which assisted in their rescue. Others phoned their families leading to them being found. From 3 p.m. on the day of the collapse onwards, no additional survivors were recovered from the disaster site. After 8 p.m., updates were suspended until the next day, after requests were made by the victims' relatives.

Emergency services documented at least 138 ambulance transfers, though the actual number of injured individuals exceeded 150 according to national director of emergency management operations Juan Manuel Méndez. The discrepancy was attributed to multiple casualties being sometimes transported in a single ambulance. At least 155 trips were made to nearby hospitals. By 9 April, the Dominican government announced a shift from search and rescue to recovering bodies. Officials with the Dominican Republic Emergency Operations Center stated on 12 April that 189 were rescued from the rubble alive and 15 remained hospitalized.

Abinader visited the disaster site on the morning of 8 April to assess the situation and affirm the government's commitment to the rescue efforts. He emphasized that "all government resources" were being utilized in the ongoing operation. Rescue crews from Israel, Puerto Rico and Mexico arrived in Santo Domingo on 9 April to assist in rescue efforts. Mayor of Santo Domingo Carolina Mejía activated the municipal disaster response committee, and expressed condolences to families awaiting news about their loved ones. The municipal government coordinated closely with national emergency services to manage the crisis. The management of the Jet Set nightclub pledged their full cooperation with authorities in the investigation and in providing assistance to victims and their families. Mejia's office also provided 170 coffins to six funeral homes handling the remains of the victims. All of the casualties were identified by 12 April.

== Casualties ==
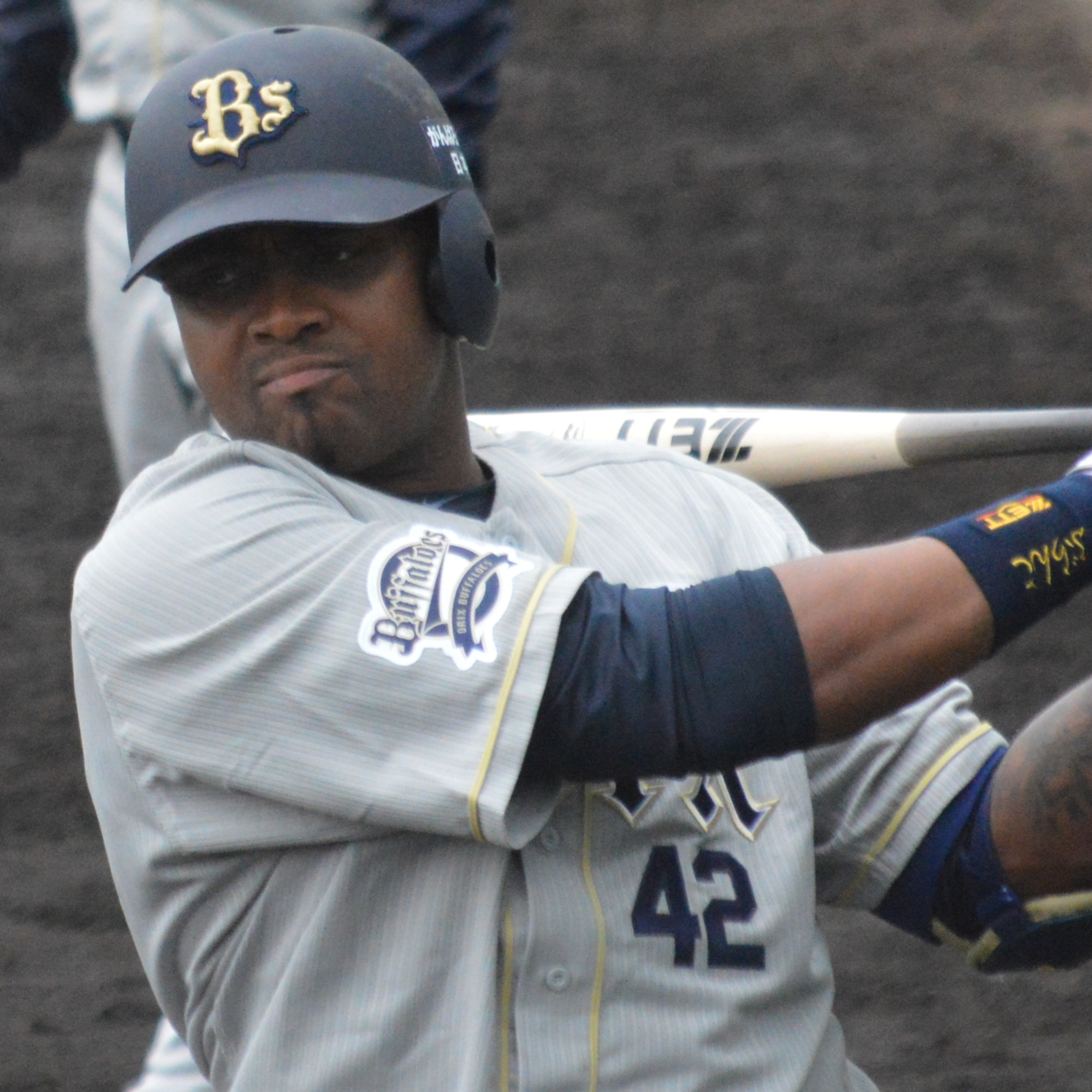
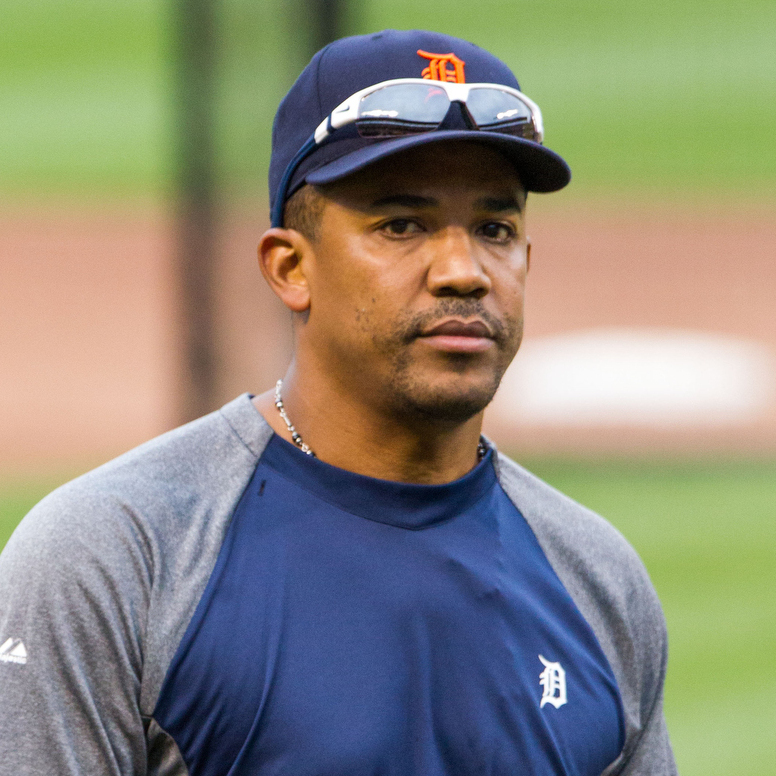
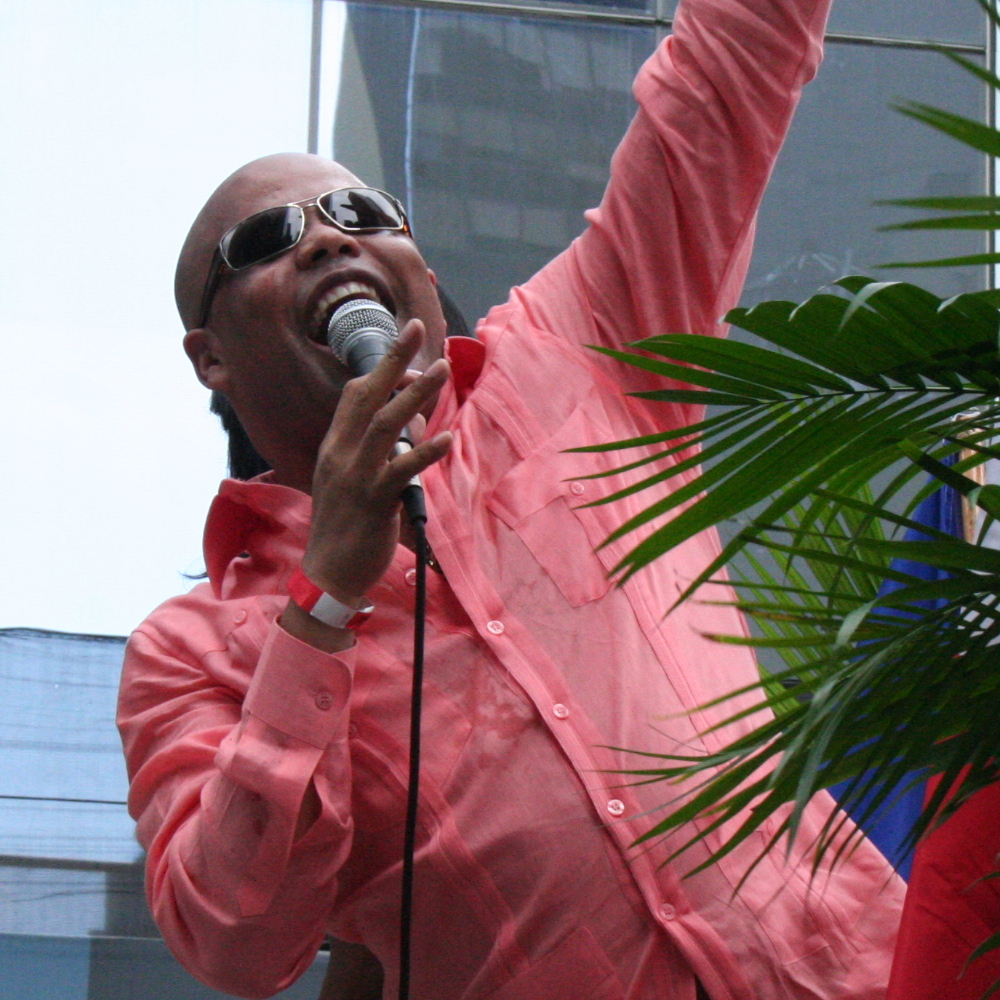
Tony Blanco, Octavio Dotel, and Rubby Pérez were among those killed in the collapse.

Deaths by citizenship
Citizenship	Deaths
Dominican Republic	215
Venezuela	11
United States	3 (Note: Some sources reported Mutuku Sila James, a citizen of Kenya, as an American citizen. It has not been clarified whether the discrepancy stems from whether or not the man held both nationalities, as he is reported as being either American or Kenyan. To avoid confusion, he is listed here as a victim from Kenya and is not included in the American toll.)
France	2
Colombia	1
Costa Rica	1
Haiti	1
Italy	1
Kenya	1
Total	236

The collapse killed 236 people and injured more than 180 others. The fatalities included former Major League Baseball pitcher Octavio Dotel, baseball player Tony Blanco (who died saving Esteban Germán), and Rubby Pérez. National football team player Luis Guillén, fashion designer Martín Polanco and National District Mayor's Office's Director of Urban Infrastructure Christian Alejandro Tejeda Pichardo were also confirmed dead.

Among the fatalities were 21 foreigners, including 11 citizens of Venezuela, three from the United States, two from France, and one citizen each from Colombia, Costa Rica, Haiti, Italy and Kenya.

Telemicro news anchor Elianta Quintero, a Venezuelan citizen, was injured. Grupo Popular, the largest financial conglomerate in the Dominican Republic, confirmed the death of several members of its owners, the Grullón family: chairman of AFP Popular (the financial group's private pension fund subsidiary) Eduardo Grullón and his wife, as well as his sister and her husband.

President Abinader also confirmed that Nelsy Cruz, governor of Monte Cristi province, was among those killed. Her death was attributed to injuries from falling glass. More than 200 people were injured including members of the Chamber of Deputies Bray Vargas and Carlos J. Gil Rodríguez in addition to Rodriguez's wife.

== Aftermath ==
Dominican Social Policy Cabinet coordinator Tony Peña Guaba characterized the event as the "worst non-atmospheric disaster" in the nation's history. Initially, President Abinader declared a three-day national period of mourning from 8 to 10 April, lowering all national flags at public structures and military precincts to half-mast. On 10 April, he extended the mourning period to six days. His office also said that a commission of national and international experts would be established to investigate the disaster.

The Senate of the Dominican Republic suspended a scheduled session for all committee activities on 9 April, and it issued a statement expressing regret for the disaster. In the immediate aftermath of the disaster, reports from Diario Libre said that Santo Domingo had an "unusual" decline in traffic, with fewer pedestrians and an "unusual silence". A memorial service was held for Rubby Pérez at the Eduardo Brito National Theater on 10 April, with President Abinader and First Lady Raquel Arbaje in attendance.

== Reactions ==
In the hours after the disaster, the family of Nelsy Cruz announced that memorial services would be held at the Provincial Government of Montecristi, with funeral proceedings scheduled for the evening of 8 April. In a statement, the commissioner of Major League Baseball, Robert Manfred, offered condolences for the deaths of Governor Cruz (the sister of former player Nelson Cruz) and former players Octavio Dotel and Tony Blanco. New York Mets player Juan Soto and former pitcher Pedro Martínez expressed their condolences to the victims' families. Dotel played for the St. Louis Cardinals, New York Yankees, Houston Astros, Toronto Blue Jays, Detroit Tigers, Pittsburgh Pirates, Colorado Rockies, and Oakland Athletics. Each team released social media statements mourning his death. Dotel also played for the Mets, the Kansas City Royals, the Atlanta Braves, the Chicago White Sox, and the Los Angeles Dodgers. Before the start of a game against the Miami Marlins, the Mets held a tribute and moment of silence for Dotel.

In Haina, the hometown of deceased performer Rubby Pérez and at least 28 other victims, members of the Jaineros Dorados choir lit masses of candles in tribute to the deceased. Minister of Culture Roberto Salcedo Jr. publicly mourned the loss of Governor Cruz, describing her death as "an irreparable loss for her community and for the entire country" and recognizing her contributions as "a committed public servant" and "a woman of steadfast leadership".

Celebrities who expressed solidarity and remorse for the victims and their loved ones include rappers Bad Bunny, Daddy Yankee, Cardi B, and Don Omar; musicians Juan Luis Guerra, Alejandro Sanz, Wilfrido Vargas, and Francisca Valenzuela; singers Ricardo Montaner, Eddy Herrera, Natti Natasha, Thalía, Marc Anthony, and Olga Tañón; and actress Clarissa Molina.

Several members of the United States Congress including María Elvira Salazar, Nydia Velázquez, and Adriano Espaillat, as well as New York State senator Luis R. Sepúlveda, offered condolences. Nicolás Maduro, the president of Venezuela, expressed his "most heartfelt message of condolence" to the "sister Dominican Republic and its people". Bruno Rodríguez Parrilla, the minister of foreign affairs of Cuba, expressed on behalf of the Cuban government his condolences to the Dominican people and the government for the loss of human life. Russian president Vladimir Putin sent his "sincere condolences" and said that Russia "shares the sorrow of the Dominican people over this tragic incident".

The Espaillat family, one of the wealthiest families in the Dominican Republic and the owners of the nightclub, released a statement expressing their regret.

== Investigations ==
In order to determine the cause of the collapse, President Abinader announced the formation of a commission of national and international experts, and an investigation was begun by the Attorney General of the Dominican Republic. Abinader indicated that questions must be answered, "qué pasó, por qué pasó y cómo pasó" ("what happened, why it happened, and how it happened"). A separate technical investigation was carried out by the Dominican National Office for Seismic Assessment and Vulnerability of Infrastructure and Buildings (Onesvie). Civil engineers and architects who reviewed the damages noted that the roof was inadequately supported by narrow columns on the sides and none in the center. The roof could have collapsed under its own weight due to the heavy machinery it was supporting. At the time of the collapse, the Dominican Republic did not have a formal building inspection code written in law, with President Abinader announcing new legislation that would introduce this.

On 14 April 2025, a lawsuit was filed by relatives of one of the deceased against Jet Set owner Antonio Espaillat, his mother, Ana Grecia López, the Dominican government and the Santo Domingo mayor's office, demanding unspecified damages from them and a criminal conviction for involuntary manslaughter against the Espaillats. On 12 June, Antonio Espaillat was arrested along with his sister Maribel, with the Attorney General's Office accusing them of "immense irresponsibility and negligence by failing to physically intervene to prevent the club's roof from collapsing". The two were subsequently released after posting bail of 50 million pesos ($840,000). On 7 November 2025, prosecutors filed charges of manslaughter, involuntary assault and battery against the Espaillat siblings and three others. On 15 June 2026, a judge ruled that the siblings would stand trial for involuntary manslaughter.

== See also ==
- List of building and structure collapses
