= Nelsy Cruz =

Dominican Republic politician (1982–2025)

Governor of Monte Cristi
- In office 16 August 2020 – 8 April 2025
- Preceded by: Marcos Jorge Ventura
- Succeeded by: Leissa Virginia Cruz Polanco

Personal details
- Born: Nelsy Milagros Cruz Martínez; 6 August 1982 Las Matas de Santa Cruz, Monte Cristi, Dominican Republic
- Died: 8 April 2025 (aged 42) Santo Domingo, Dominican Republic
- Cause of death: Injuries sustained in the Jet Set nightclub roof collapse
- Party: PRM
- Children: 1
- Relatives: Nelson Cruz (brother)

Nelsy Milagros Cruz Martínez (6 August 1982 – 8 April 2025) was a Dominican politician who served as governor of Monte Cristi Province from 2020 until her death in 2025. A member of the Modern Revolutionary Party (PRM), she died after a nightclub roof collapse in Santo Domingo.

== Early life ==
Nelsy Cruz was born in Las Matas de Santa Cruz, Monte Cristi, on 6 August 1982. She spent much of her childhood and adolescence in Las Matas, where her parents ran a store popular with bus and truck drivers. The family had two other children: Olga, and the baseball player Nelson. She later studied design at the Chavón Design School and relocated to the city of Santiago de los Caballeros.

== Career ==
Cruz was appointed governor of the province of Monte Cristi by President Luis Abinader of the Modern Revolutionary Party shortly after his victory in the 2020 general election and took her oath of office on 19 August 2020. During her first year in office, she controversially claimed in a television interview that the members of the Dominican Liberation Party (PLD) still employed in government positions "had their days numbered" and would be replaced by supporters of the PRM; after a reprimand from the government ethics office, she apologised and stated that her actions since her inauguration as governor had been intended to serve the people regardless of any political banners.

In October 2023 she was announced as the PRM's prospective candidate for Monte Cristi's Senate seat in the 2024 general election. Her nomination was, however, challenged by former senator Bernardo Alemán Rodríguez, who ultimately fought – and won – the seat in the 19 May 2024 election.

== Death ==
Cruz was injured in the Jet Set nightclub roof collapse in Santo Domingo on 8 April 2025. She managed to notify President Abinader of the disaster and was rescued, but later died during surgery, at the age of 42.

Her funeral was held in Las Matas de Santa Cruz on 9 April and was attended by President Abinader and First Lady Raquel Arbaje.
