= Esteban Germán =

Dominican baseball player (born 1978)

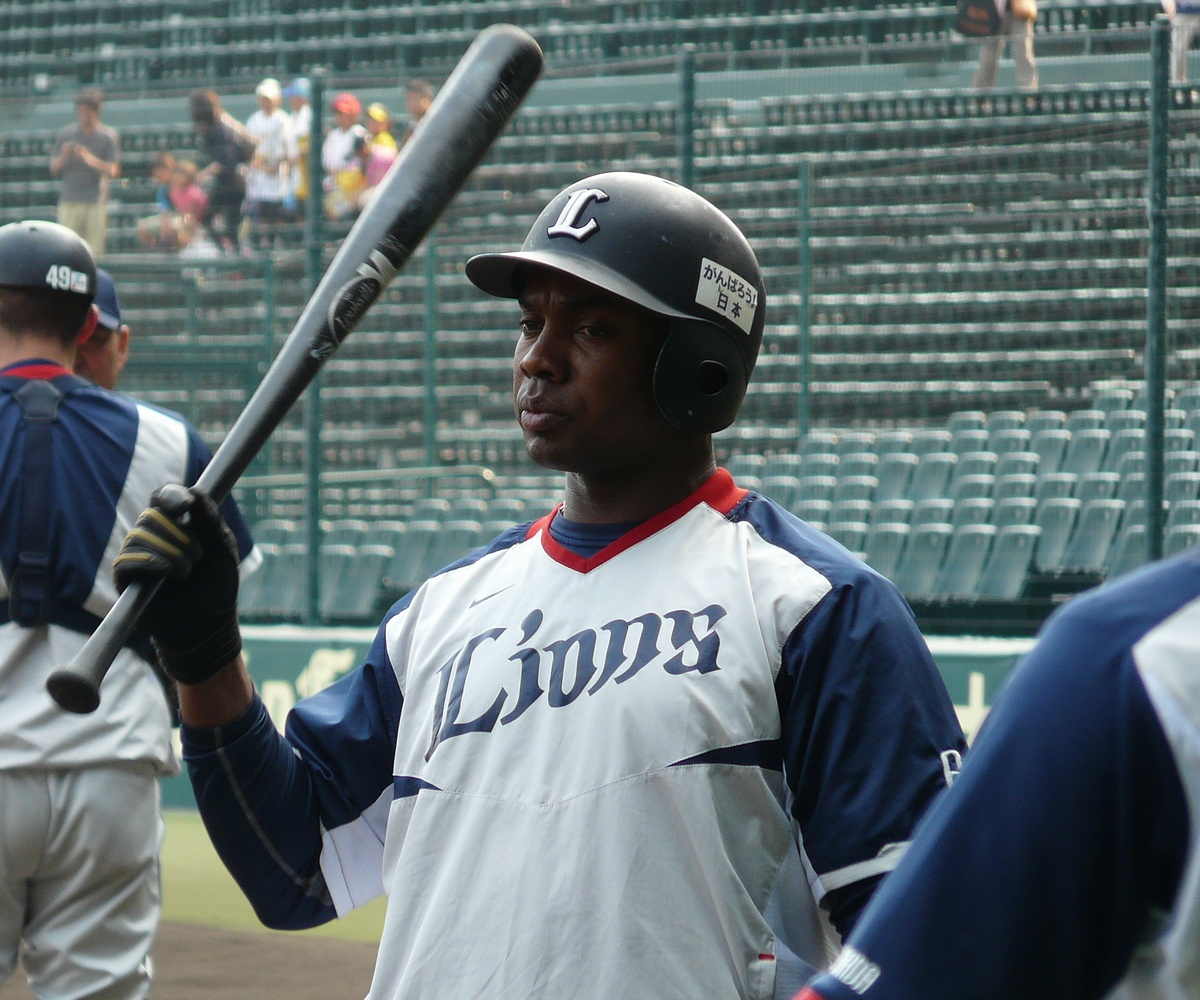
- Germán with the Saitama Seibu Lions in 2012
- Second baseman / Third baseman
- Born: January 26, 1978 (age 48); Santo Domingo, Dominican Republic
- Batted: Right Threw: Right

Professional debut
- MLB: May 5, 2002, for the Oakland Athletics
- NPB: March 30, 2012, for the Saitama Seibu Lions

Last appearance
- MLB: September 27, 2011, for the Texas Rangers
- NPB: September 23, 2015, for the Orix Buffaloes

MLB statistics
- Batting average: .280
- Home runs: 8
- Runs batted in: 111

NPB statistics
- Batting average: .278
- Home runs: 15
- Runs batted in: 182
- Stats at Baseball Reference

Teams
- Oakland Athletics (2002–2004); Texas Rangers (2005); Kansas City Royals (2006–2008); Texas Rangers (2009–2011); Saitama Seibu Lions (2012–2013); Orix Buffaloes (2014–2015)

Esteban Germán Guridi (born January 26, 1978) is a Dominican former professional baseball second baseman. He played in Major League Baseball (MLB) for the Kansas City Royals, Oakland Athletics, and Texas Rangers, and in Nippon Professional Baseball (NPB) for the Saitama Seibu Lions and Orix Buffaloes.

== Career ==
In the 2002 through 2005 seasons, Germán played sparingly, appearing in a total of 50 games.

On December 8, 2005, during the Winter Meetings, Germán was acquired by the Kansas City Royals from the Rangers in exchange for minor leaguer Fabio Castro. In 2006 as a member of the Royals, Germán saw an increase in playing time and made an impression. In 106 games that season, he batted .326 with three home runs and 34 RBI, while playing a range of positions which included all four infield positions, left field, center field, and designated hitter.

On March 13, 2009, Germán signed a minor league contract with the Chicago Cubs and was invited to spring training, but was released a month later. On April 8, 2009, the Rangers re-signed Germán to a minor league contract.

On December 16, 2009, Germán, was outrighted off the 40 man roster to Triple-A. He would have his contract repurchased by the Texas Rangers, and returned to the 40-man roster, in September 2010.

In 2011, Germán had 11 at-bats in 11 games for the Rangers, splitting his time in the field between second base and third base. On November 2, 2011, Germán was removed from the 40-man roster and sent outright to the Triple-A Oklahoma City RedHawks. He elected free agency two days later.

Germán signed with the Saitama Seibu Lions of Nippon Professional Baseball on December 14, 2011.

Germán signed with the Orix Buffaloes of Nippon Professional Baseball for the 2014 season.

== Personal life ==
In 2025, Germán survived the Jet Set Nightclub roof collapse after being saved by Tony Blanco, who died in the process.
