= Tony Blanco =

Dominican baseball player (1980–2025)

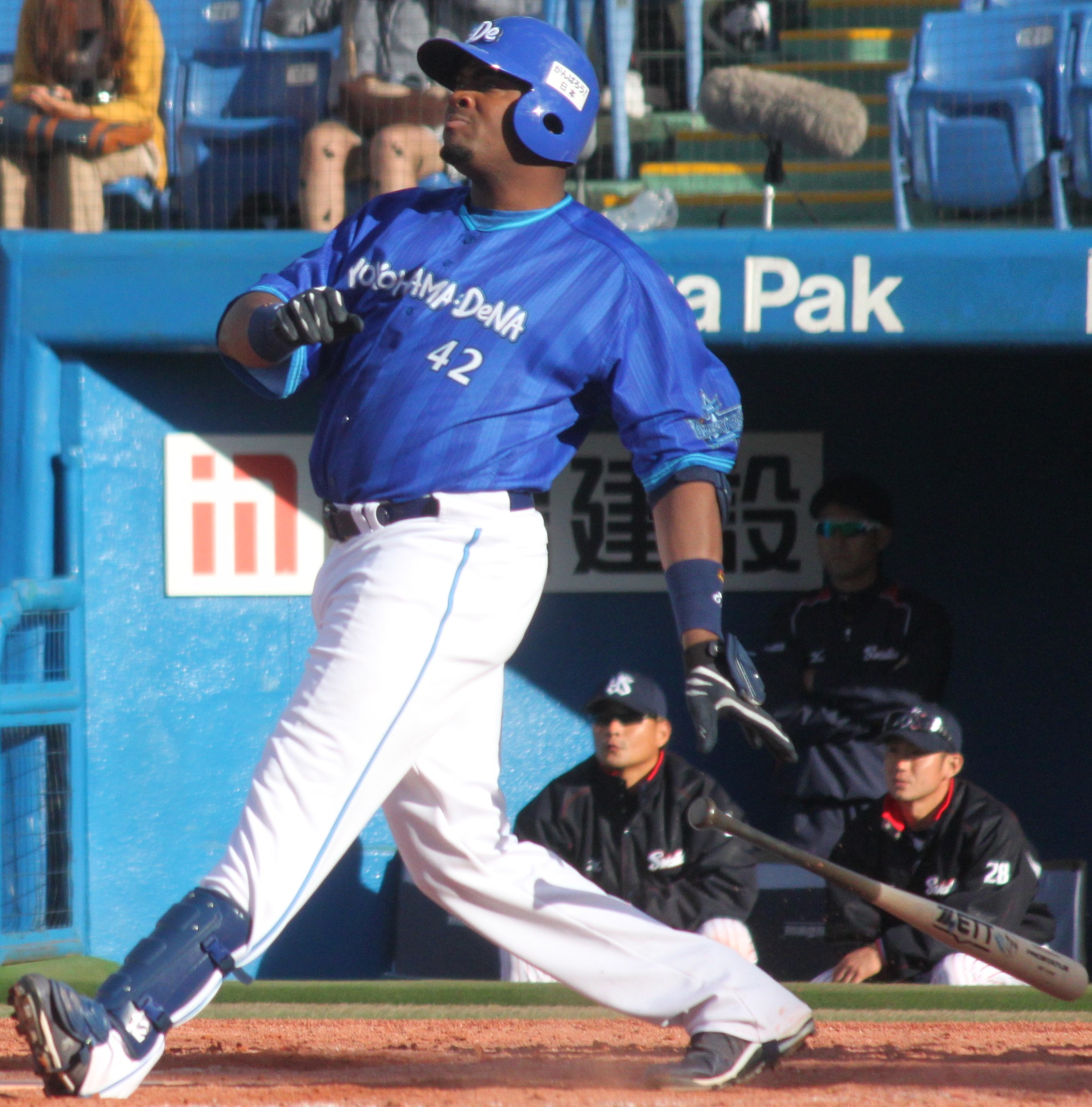
- Blanco with the Yokohama DeNA BayStars
- First baseman
- Born: November 10, 1981; San Juan de la Maguana, Dominican Republic
- Died: April 8, 2025 (aged 44); Santo Domingo, Dominican Republic
- Batted: Right Threw: Right

Professional debut
- MLB: April 4, 2005, for the Washington Nationals
- NPB: April 3, 2009, for the Chunichi Dragons

Last appearance
- MLB: September 24, 2005, for the Washington Nationals
- NPB: July 12, 2016, for the Orix Buffaloes

MLB statistics
- Batting average: .177
- Home runs: 1
- Runs batted in: 7

NPB statistics
- Batting average: .272
- Home runs: 181
- Runs batted in: 542
- Stats at Baseball Reference

Teams
- Washington Nationals (2005); Chunichi Dragons (2009–2012); Yokohama DeNA BayStars (2013–2014); Orix Buffaloes (2015–2016)

Career highlights and awards
- NPB: 4× NPB All-Star (2009–2010, 2013–2014); 3× Best Nine Award (2009, 2012–2013); Central League batting champion (2013); 2× Central League RBI leader (2009, 2013); Central League home run leader (2009)

Tony Enrique Blanco Cabrera (November 10, 1981 – April 8, 2025) was a Dominican professional baseball player. He was mainly a first baseman, third baseman, and outfielder. Blanco played one season in the Major Leagues for the Washington Nationals but had more success playing in Japan for several teams. He died in April 2025 in the Jet Set nightclub roof collapse in Santo Domingo.

== Playing career ==
Blanco signed with the Boston Red Sox as a 16-year old and began in the team's farm system as a third baseman. In December 2002, he was traded to the Cincinnati Reds as a player to be named later, completing an earlier trade that sent Todd Walker to Boston. Injuries, including Tommy John surgery, slowed Blanco's climb through the minors, but by 2004, playing in High A Potomac and Double A Chattanooga, Blanco was showing enough promise to play for the World Team in the All-Star Futures Game in Houston.

Blanco was picked up by the Nationals as a Rule 5 Draft in the offseason and made the big league club's opening day roster in 2005. He collected his first MLB hit on April 8 and hit his only big league home run on May 22. Blanco only played sporadically and ended his first and only MLB season with a .177 average.

Blanco bounced around the Washington minor league system in 2006-07 and then landed with the Double-A Tulsa Drillers in the Colorado Rockies organization in 2008, batting .323 with 23 home runs and 88 RBIs.

After the 2008 season, Blanco played in the Dominican Winter League for the Estrellas Orientales. He then signed with Chunichi Dragons of Nippon Professional Baseball (NPB) in Japan. Blanco finished his first season in NPB with 39 home runs and 110 RBIs, both leading in Central League, along with a .275 batting average. He also received a Central League Performance Award for inter-league games (11 home runs and 24 RBIs) and won the home run derby before the all-star game, in which he played as the Central League first baseman.

Blanco played eight seasons in the NPB for Chunichi, Yokohama, and Orix, slugging 181 home runs and 542 RBI, including career highs of 41 and 136 for Yokohama in 2013. He retired after another brief stint in the Dominican League in 2017.

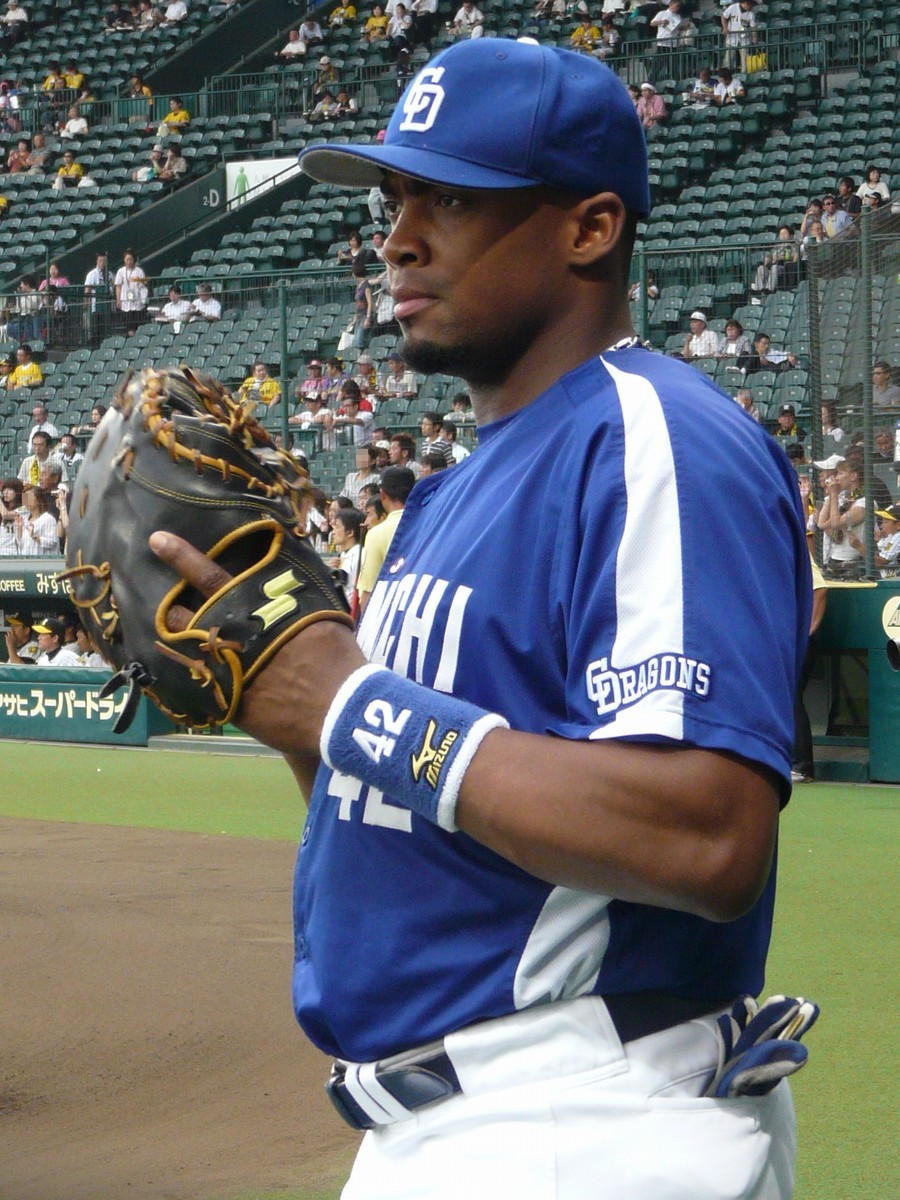
Blanco with the Chunichi Dragons at Hanshin Koshien Stadium

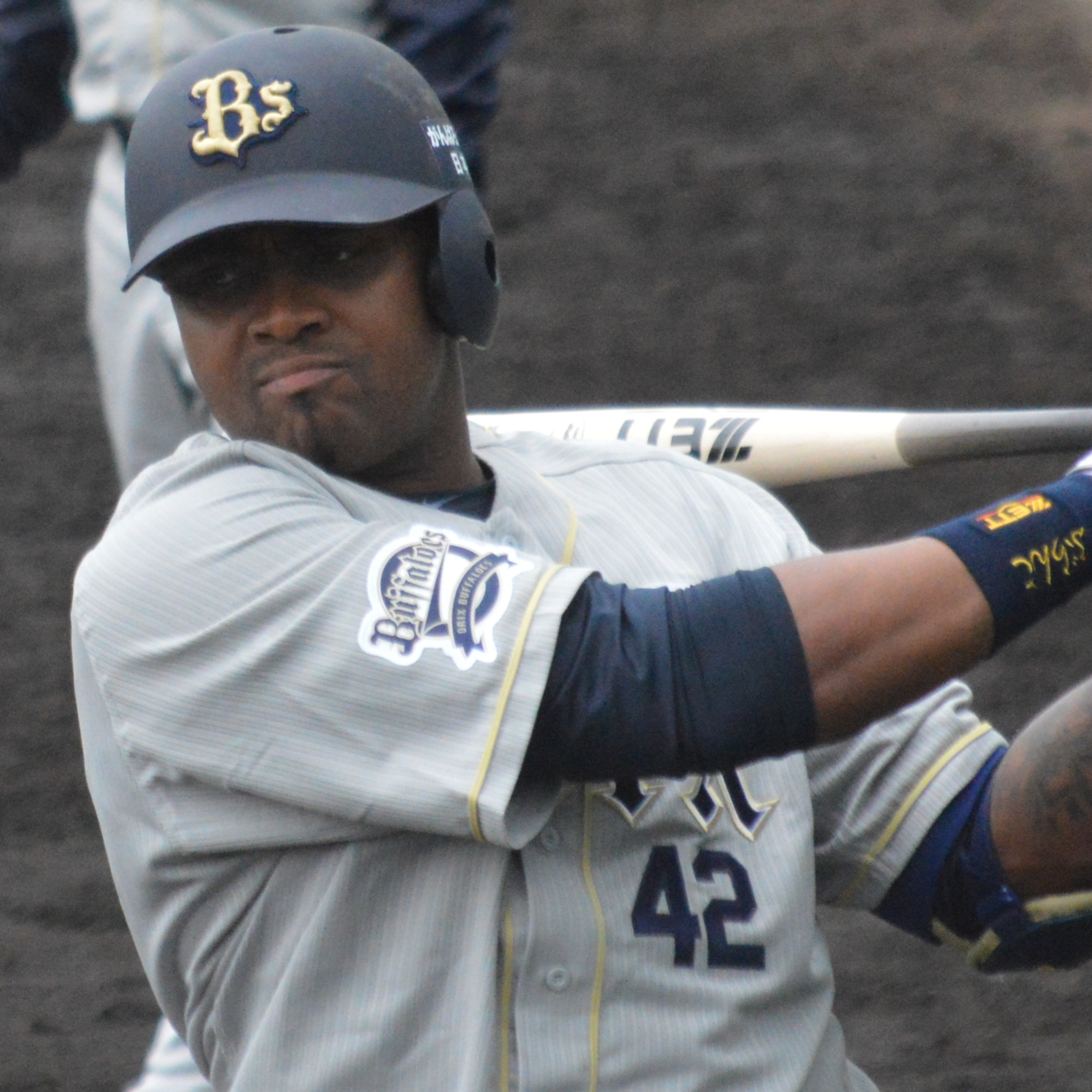
Blanco with the Orix Buffaloes at the Hanshin Naruohama Baseball Ground

== Personal life and death ==
Blanco's son, Tony Blanco Jr., plays in the Pittsburgh Pirates minor league system.

Blanco died on April 8, 2025, from injuries sustained in the Jet Set nightclub roof collapse in Santo Domingo. He was 44. Fellow Dominican baseball player Octavio Dotel was also killed in the incident. Blanco died saving his friend Esteban Germán.
