= Octavio Dotel =

Dominican baseball player (1973–2025)

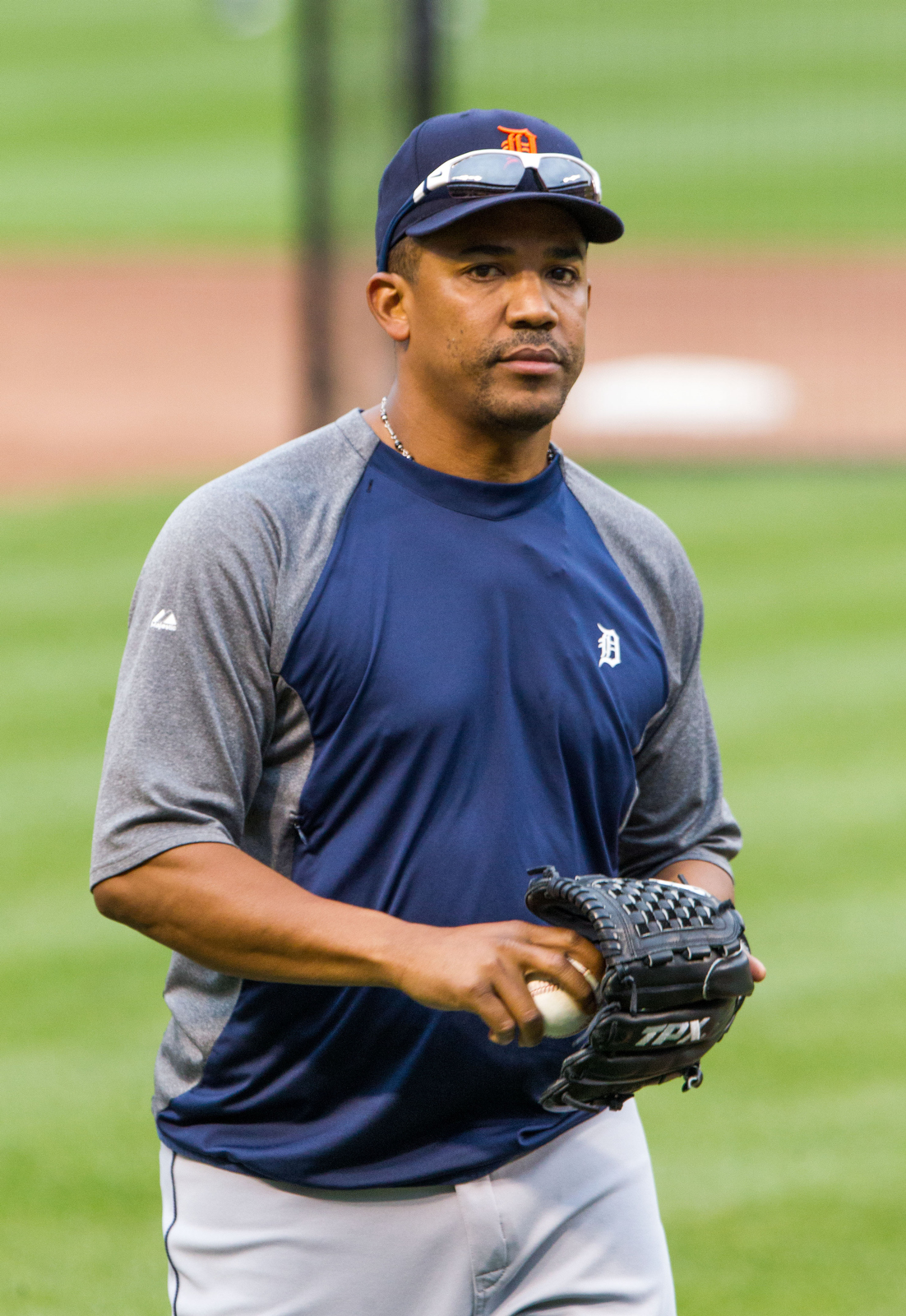
- Dotel with the Tigers in 2012
- Pitcher
- Born: November 25, 1973; Santo Domingo, Dominican Republic
- Died: April 8, 2025 (aged 51); Santo Domingo, Dominican Republic
- Batted: Right Threw: Right

MLB debut
- June 26, 1999, for the New York Mets

Last MLB appearance
- April 19, 2013, for the Detroit Tigers

MLB statistics
- Win–loss record: 59–50
- Earned run average: 3.78
- Strikeouts: 1,143
- Saves: 109
- Stats at Baseball Reference

Teams
- New York Mets (1999); Houston Astros (2000–2004); Oakland Athletics (2004–2005); New York Yankees (2006); Kansas City Royals (2007); Atlanta Braves (2007); Chicago White Sox (2008–2009); Pittsburgh Pirates (2010); Los Angeles Dodgers (2010); Colorado Rockies (2010); Toronto Blue Jays (2011); St. Louis Cardinals (2011); Detroit Tigers (2012–2013)

Career highlights and awards
- World Series champion (2011); Pitched a combined no-hitter on June 11, 2003
Medals
Men's baseball
Representing Dominican Republic
World Baseball Classic
Gold medal – first place	2013 San Francisco	Team

Octavio Eduardo Dotel Diaz (November 25, 1973 – April 8, 2025) was a Dominican professional baseball pitcher who played 15 seasons in Major League Baseball (MLB). He played for 13 major league teams, the second-most of any player in history. Dotel spent most of his career as a relief pitcher, including several stints as a closer, during which he recorded 109 saves. Dotel's longest tenure with a single team was the five seasons he spent with the Houston Astros. On June 11, 2003, he combined with five other Astros pitchers to throw a no-hitter.

Dotel won the 2011 World Series while playing for the St. Louis Cardinals. As a member of the Detroit Tigers in 2012, he set the record for playing with the most major league teams, a record that stood until 2019. In 2013, as a member of the Dominican national team, Dotel won the World Baseball Classic championship; along with fellow Dominicans Robinson Canó and Santiago Casilla, he became one of the few players in history to win both a World Series and a World Baseball Classic. He died in the Jet Set nightclub roof collapse in Santo Domingo.

== Career ==
=== New York Mets ===
Dotel graduated from Liceo Cansino Afuera in the Dominican Republic and was signed by the New York Mets as an amateur free agent in 1993. At the time of his signing Dotel used a false birthdate to pass as 17 years old when he was in fact 19. He played for their minor league affiliate in the Dominican Summer League through 1994 and then was promoted through the Mets' minor league system for the next several seasons. Dotel made his MLB debut on June 26, 1999, for the Mets, taking the loss in a 7–2 defeat to the Atlanta Braves. His first MLB win came July 1, 1999, against the Florida Marlins. He ended the season pitching three innings in relief and as the winning pitcher in the 15-inning Game 5 of the 1999 National League Championship Series against the Braves. The game ended with Robin Ventura's Grand Slam Single.

He was voted NL Player of the Week for the week of July 25, 1999.

=== Houston Astros ===
On December 23, 1999, the Mets traded Dotel with Roger Cedeño and minor leaguer Kyle Kessel to the Houston Astros for Mike Hampton and Derek Bell.

In 2000, Dotel went 3–7 with 16 saves and a 5.40 ERA in 50 games (16 starts). He began the season as a starter but was converted to a reliever for the Astros; Dotel began to fill in as a closer for an injured Billy Wagner. This season marked the first time in National League history that a pitcher had over 15 starts and 15 saves (the other seasons in MLB history where this feat happened were in 1957, when Ray Narleski started 15 games and had 16 saves with the Cleveland Indians, in 1999, when Tim Wakefield had 17 starts and attained 15 saves for the Boston Red Sox, and in 2004, when Dustin Hermanson started 18 games and converted 17 saves for the San Francisco Giants).

In 2001, Dotel again began the season as a starter but moved into the bullpen as the setup man for Wagner. Dotel had an excellent season in 2002; he led all relievers with 118 strikeouts and helped secure a well-reputed bullpen for the Astros then. By 2003, Dotel and Wagner were joined by future Astros closer Brad Lidge and all three partook in a combined no-hitter against the New York Yankees on June 11, 2003.

After the 2003 season, Wagner was traded to the Philadelphia Phillies, and Dotel started the 2004 season as the closer for the Astros.

=== Oakland Athletics ===
On June 24, 2004, Dotel was traded to the Oakland Athletics in a three-team trade that sent Carlos Beltrán to the Astros, minor leaguer Mike Wood, Mark Teahen, and John Buck to the Kansas City Royals. Dotel served as the closer for the Athletics and finished the 2004 season with a combined 6–6 record with a 3.69 ERA and a career-high 36 saves (22 for the A's and 14 for the Astros) in 77 relief appearances.

Dotel began 2005 as the closer for the Athletics again, but had a rough start and went on the 60-day disabled list on May 21. It was later announced on June 2 that he would undergo Tommy John surgery, ending his season after just 15 games.

=== New York Yankees ===
Dotel signed a one-year, $2 million deal with the New York Yankees in December 2005. He missed the first four months of the 2006 season, recovering from his Tommy John surgery. Dotel had a setback after developing tendinitis in his elbow while on a rehab assignment with the Trenton Thunder. This pushed his return into August as he went through another minor league assignment with the Columbus Clippers. Dotel pitched his first game in a Yankees uniform on August 16, coming into the game in the eighth inning against the Baltimore Orioles, facing two batters with one strikeout and one walk. He finished the season playing in 14 games with no record and an ERA of 10.80.

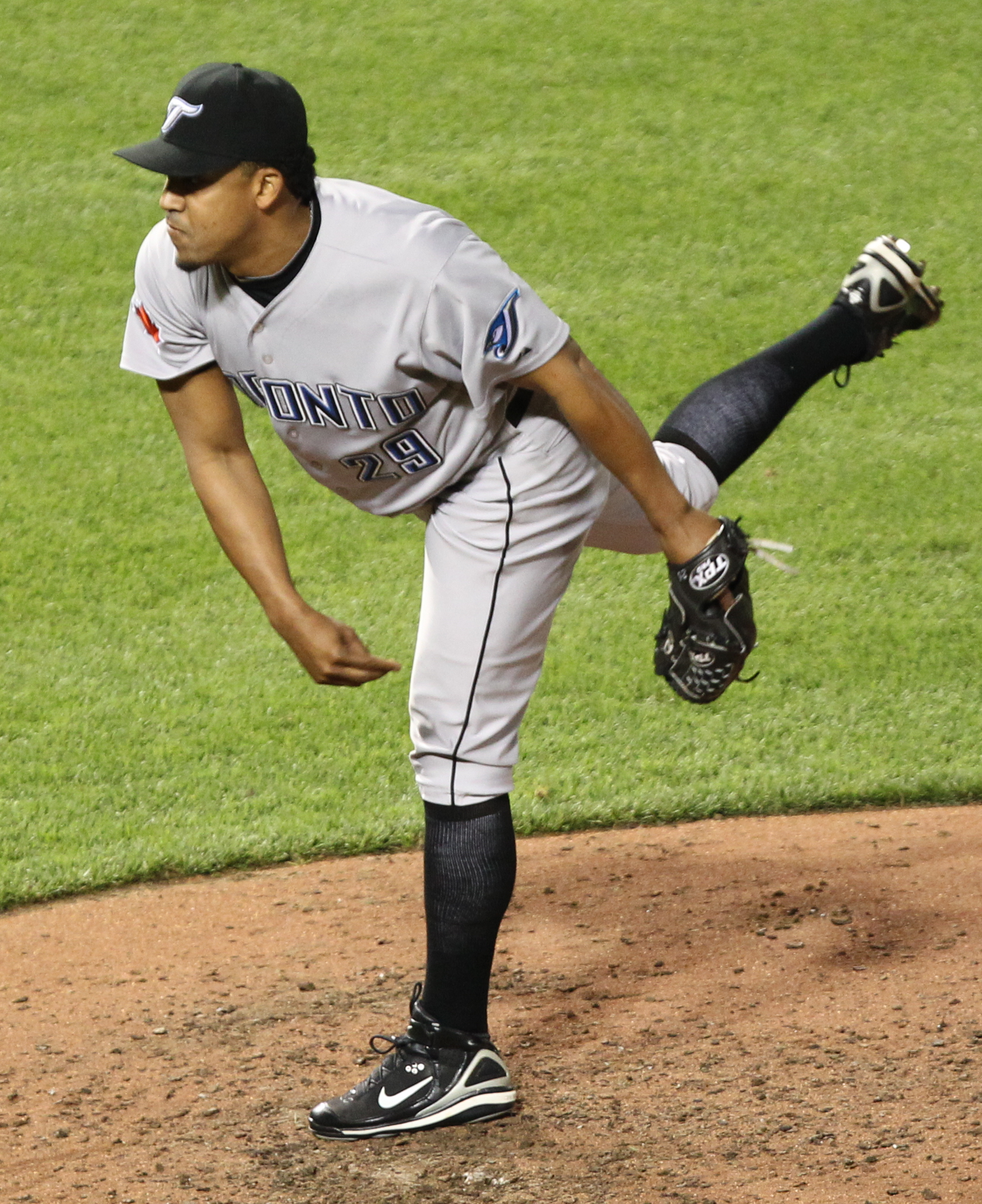
Dotel with the Toronto Blue Jays in 2011

=== Kansas City Royals ===
Dotel became a free agent at the end of the 2006 MLB season. On December 8, 2006, he agreed to a one-year contract with the Kansas City Royals for $5 million. Dotel made 24 relief appearances to start the season, going 2–1 with 11 saves and a 3.91 ERA.

=== Atlanta Braves ===
On July 31, 2007, the Royals traded Dotel to the Atlanta Braves in exchange for pitcher Kyle Davies. He made his Braves debut on August 1, throwing a scoreless ninth inning in a 12–3 rout of the Astros. On August 10, Dotel was placed on the disabled list with a right shoulder strain. He made his return on September 22 escaping a bases-loaded jam which eventually led to a Braves win. He recorded a 4.70 ERA in nine appearances with the Braves and finished the season 2–1 with a 4.11 ERA in 33 combined relief appearances.

=== Chicago White Sox ===
On January 21, 2008, Dotel agreed to a two-year, $11 million deal with the Chicago White Sox.

=== Pittsburgh Pirates ===
On January 21, 2010, Dotel agreed to a one-year, $3.25 million deal with the Pittsburgh Pirates, plus bonuses for games finished. The deal also included a club option for 2011 for $4.5 million with a $250,000 buyout. Dotel started the year as the Pirates closer and stayed the closer until he was traded. He was 2–2 with 21 saves and a 4.28 ERA in 41 relief appearances with the Pirates.

=== Los Angeles Dodgers ===
On July 31, 2010, Dotel was traded to the Los Angeles Dodgers for James McDonald and Andrew Lambo. He appeared in 19 games with the Dodgers and went 1–1 with one save and a 3.38 ERA.

=== Colorado Rockies ===
On September 18, 2010, Dotel was traded to the Colorado Rockies for a player to be named later. Dotel was ineligible to play on the postseason roster, but it made no difference as Colorado missed the playoffs. Dotel appeared in eight games with the Rockies, going 0–1 with a 5.06 ERA.

=== Toronto Blue Jays ===
On December 29, 2010, Dotel agreed to a one-year, $3.5 million deal with the Toronto Blue Jays with a club option for 2012. He earned his 50th career victory while he played for Toronto.

=== St. Louis Cardinals ===
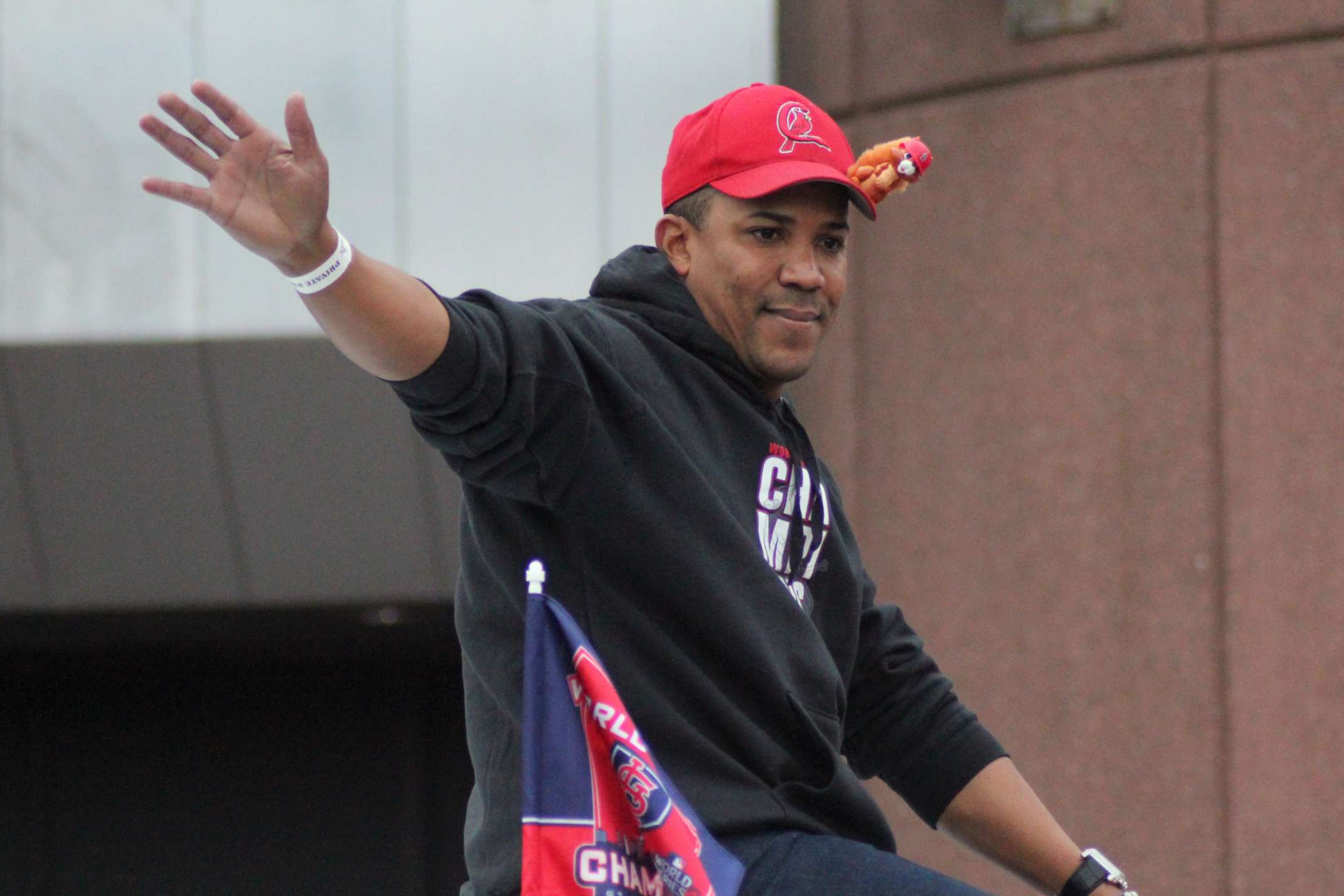
Dotel during the 2011 World Series parade

On July 27, 2011, Dotel was traded to the St. Louis Cardinals with Edwin Jackson, Marc Rzepczynski and Corey Patterson for Colby Rasmus, P. J. Walters, Trever Miller and Brian Tallet. Dotel got his first championship title when the Cardinals beat the Texas Rangers in the 2011 World Series. On October 31, 2011, it was announced that the Cardinals would not pick up the team option for the 2012 season, making Dotel a type A free agent.

While playing for the Cardinals, Dotel served as a mentor to Rzepczynski.

=== Detroit Tigers ===
Dotel signed a one-year deal with the Detroit Tigers on December 7, 2011. He made his debut for them on April 7, 2012. The Tigers were Dotel's thirteenth major league team, allowing him to pass Matt Stairs, Mike Morgan and Ron Villone for the MLB record of the most teams for which a player played.

I've been all over the place. I've been in every league. Every division, too: West, Central, East. National League – boom, boom, boom. American League – boom, boom, boom.

— Octavio Dotel

Dotel made his 700th appearance in a major-league game on April 21, 2012, in the nightcap of a doubleheader against the Texas Rangers.

Dotel entered the World Series for the second year in a row, but the Tigers lost to the San Francisco Giants in a four-game sweep. On October 30, 2012, the Tigers picked up Dotel's option for the 2013 season.

On April 23, 2013, Dotel was placed on the 15-day DL due to right elbow inflammation. He was transferred to the 60-day DL on June 8.

=== Retirement ===
On October 3, 2014, Dotel announced his retirement from professional baseball at the age of 40 after pitching 15 seasons for 13 MLB teams. His career strikeout rate of 10.8 per nine innings is the best in the history of baseball for right-handed pitchers with at least 900 innings pitched.

== Pitching style ==
Dotel mainly threw a four-seam fastball from 90 to 93 miles per hour (145 to 150 km/h). He had two breaking balls, mostly used in two-strike counts: a sweeping slider in the low 80 mph (130 km/h) range and a curveball in the upper 70 mph (110 km/h) range. The slider was used against right-handed hitters, the curveball against left-handers. He was a strikeout pitcher throughout his career, finishing above 10 strikeouts per nine innings pitched in 10 full seasons. At the time of his death, he was one of 10 pitchers in MLB history with at least 700 appearances and 10 strikeouts per nine innings.

== Personal life and death ==
In November 1993, not long after Dotel signed his first contract with the New York Mets, his father was murdered. Emilio Dotel, 53, entered a taxi cab on his way home from work and was robbed and killed. His body was found a day later, 5 miles (8.0 km) from his house in Santo Domingo. Emilio and his wife, Maria Magdalena Dotel, had three sons and two daughters.

Dotel was married to Massiel.

In August 2019, Dotel was arrested on charges related to a drug trafficking and money laundering operation, while Luis Castillo was cited for related charges. Later that month, a judge cleared Dotel and Castillo of the money laundering charges. At the time of his death, Dotel was still facing a charge for allegedly possessing an illegal weapon at the time of his arrest.

Dotel died on April 8, 2025, from injuries sustained in the Jet Set nightclub roof collapse in Santo Domingo, at the age of 51. Fellow Dominican baseball player Tony Blanco was also killed in the nightclub disaster. Dotel was buried in Santo Domingo on April 10.

== See also ==
- List of Houston Astros no-hitters
- List of Houston Astros team records
- List of Major League Baseball no-hitters
- List of Major League Baseball players from the Dominican Republic
- List of Major League Baseball single-inning strikeout leaders

Awards and achievements
Preceded by Kevin Millwood	No-hit game June 11, 2003 (with Oswalt, Munro, Saarloos, Lidge, & Wagner)	Succeeded by Randy Johnson
