= Al Kaline =

American baseball player (1934–2020)

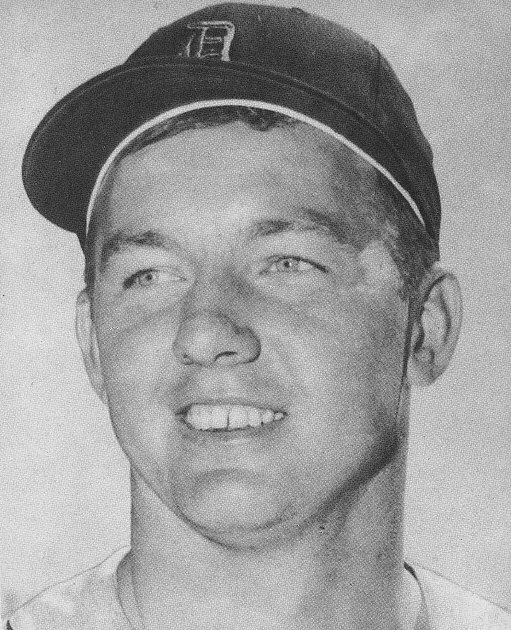
- Kaline in 1957
- Right fielder
- Born: December 19, 1934; Baltimore, Maryland, U.S.
- Died: April 6, 2020 (aged 85); Bloomfield Hills, Michigan, U.S.
- Batted: Right Threw: Right

MLB debut
- June 25, 1953, for the Detroit Tigers

Last MLB appearance
- October 2, 1974, for the Detroit Tigers

MLB statistics
- Batting average: .297
- Hits: 3,007
- Home runs: 399
- Runs batted in: 1,583
- Stats at Baseball Reference

Teams
- Detroit Tigers (1953–1974)

Career highlights and awards
- 18× All-Star (1955–1961², 1962²–1967, 1971, 1974); World Series champion (1968); 10× Gold Glove Award (1957–1959, 1961–1967); Roberto Clemente Award (1973); AL batting champion (1955); Detroit Tigers No. 6 retired

Member of the National

Baseball Hall of Fame
- Induction: 1980
- Vote: 88.3% (first ballot)

Albert William Kaline (/ˈkeɪlaɪn/ KAY-lyne; December 19, 1934 – April 6, 2020), nicknamed "Mr. Tiger", was an American professional baseball right fielder who played his entire 22-season career in Major League Baseball (MLB) for the Detroit Tigers. For most of his career, Kaline played in the outfield, mainly as a right fielder where he won ten Gold Glove Awards and was known for his strong throwing arm. He was selected to 18 All-Star Games, including selections each year between 1955 and 1967. He was elected to the Baseball Hall of Fame in 1980 in his first year of eligibility.

Near the end of his career, Kaline also played as first baseman and, in his last season, was the Tigers' designated hitter. He retired soon after reaching the 3,000 hit milestone late in the 1974 season. Immediately after retiring from playing, he became the Tigers' TV color commentator, a position he held from 1975 until 2002. Kaline worked for the Tigers as a front office assistant from 2003 until his death in 2020.

== Early life ==
Kaline was born and raised in Baltimore, Maryland, the son of Naomi (Morgan) and Nicholas Kaline. His family was poor. Several of his relatives played semi-professional baseball, but no one in the family had graduated from high school. When he was eight years old, Kaline developed osteomyelitis and had two inches of bone removed from his left foot. The surgery left him with scarring and permanent deformity, but he was an outstanding pitcher in youth baseball. Kaline had learned to throw a fastball, changeup and curveball by the age of nine.

Kaline attended Baltimore's Southern High School, where he starred in basketball and also played football until he sustained a cheek injury. When he tried out for the baseball team, there was no room on the pitching staff so Kaline moved to the outfield. He earned all-state honors in baseball all four years. Kaline said that he was a poor student but that he was well-liked by his teachers. He said that his teachers passed him, believing he would become a baseball player.

== Professional career ==
=== Early years ===
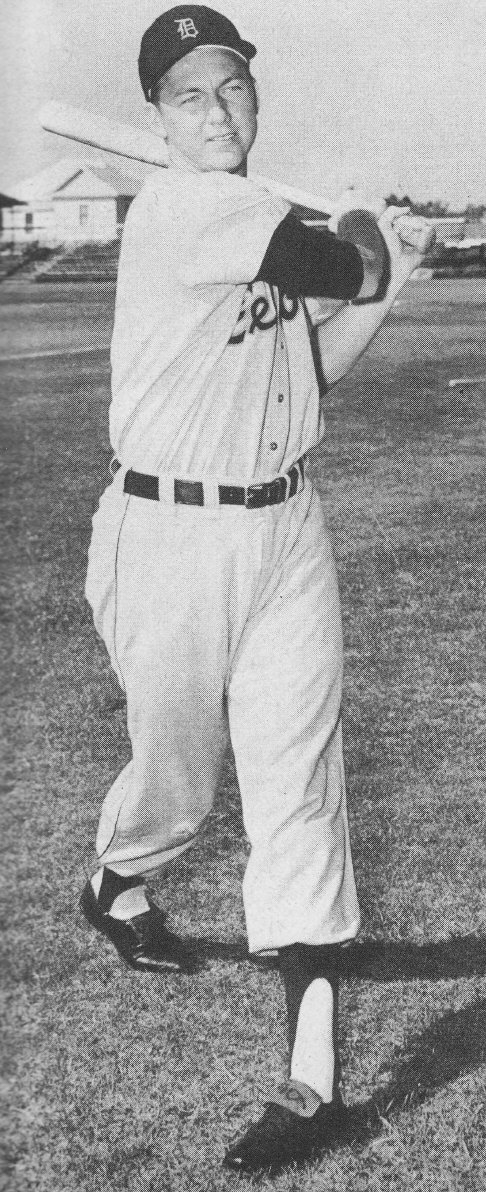
Kaline in 1957

At the time of Kaline's signing, the bonus rule implemented by Major League Baseball was still in effect. The rule stipulated that when a major league team signed a player to a contract with a signing bonus in excess of $4,000 ($58,000 today), the team was required to keep that player on their 25-man active roster for two full seasons. If the team failed to comply with the rule, they would lose the rights to that player's contract, and the player would then be exposed to the waiver wire.

Because Kaline had received a bonus of $15,000 ($216,000 today), he bypassed the minor leagues and joined the Tigers directly from high school. Ed Katalinas, the Detroit scout who had tracked him through high school, said: "To me he was the prospect that a scout creates in his mind and then prays that someone will come along to fit the pattern."

He made his major league debut on June 25, 1953 in Philadelphia as a late-inning replacement for outfielder Jim Delsing. Kaline wore number 25 during his rookie campaign, but asked teammate Pat Mullin for his No. 6 when he retired after the 1953 season ended. Kaline wore the number for the rest of his major league playing career.

In 1955, at age 20, Kaline ended the season with a .340 batting average, becoming the youngest player ever to win the American League (AL) batting title. No 20-year-old major league player had won a batting title since Ty Cobb in 1907. During the 1955 season, Kaline became the 13th man in major league history to hit two home runs in the same inning, became the youngest to hit three home runs in one game, and finished the year with 200 hits, 27 home runs and 102 runs batted in (RBIs). His 200 hits led the major leagues, and he also led the American League with 321 total bases. Kaline finished second to Yogi Berra in the American League's 1955 Most Valuable Player Award voting. He was selected to the Major League Baseball All-Star Game, the first in a string of consecutive All-Star selections that lasted through 1967.

Kaline followed in 1956 with a .314 batting average, 27 home runs and a career-high 128 RBIs, finishing third in the AL MVP voting. He led the league in outfield assists with 18 in 1956 and again in 1958 with 23. In 1957, he won the first of what would be ten Gold Glove Awards over the next eleven seasons. Kaline was out for several games in 1958 after he was hit by a pitch. He missed several games in 1959 after he was hit by a thrown ball and sustained a fracture in his cheekbone. Kaline had been knocked out from the blow and initial speculation was that he could miss six weeks of the season. Kaline ended up missing only 18 games, and finished the 1959 season with a .327 batting average and 27 home runs. He also led the AL in slugging percentage (.530) and OPS (.940). By the time of his 26th birthday, Kaline had accumulated 1,200 hits, the third highest total by a 25-year-old player in MLB history, behind only Ty Cobb (1,433) and Mel Ott (1,249).

=== Middle career ===
Following the departure of Harvey Kuenn, Kaline played the entire 1960 season in center field, the only time of his career he would do so. In 1961, the Tigers acquired Bill Bruton from the Milwaukee Braves to play center field, allowing Kaline to move back to right field.

In 1961, Kaline led the majors with 41 doubles and hit .324 to finish second in the AL batting race (behind teammate Norm Cash). The Tigers won 101 games, to date the third-highest win total in team history, but still finished eight games behind a New York Yankees team that was led by the home run heroics of Roger Maris (61) and Mickey Mantle (54). Kaline began the 1962 season hitting .345 with 13 home runs and 38 RBIs in 35 games. On May 26 of that season, he sustained a broken collarbone while making a game-ending catch on a ball hit by New York's Elston Howard. He missed 57 games due to the injury and Detroit was unable to seriously compete for a pennant due to his absence. When healthy, Kaline was great in 1962, hitting a career-high 29 home runs and driving in 94 runs in only 100 games.

By late March 1963, Kaline said that he felt good and he was hitting .373 in 53 spring training at-bats. In the 1963 regular season, Kaline hit .312 with 27 home runs and 101 RBIs, finishing second to Elston Howard in the American League's Most Valuable Player Award voting. Kaline experienced pain in his left foot, the one that had been affected by osteomyelitis as a child, throughout the 1964 season. His batting average dropped to .293 that season. Kaline tried to ignore the pain, but he saw physicians who thought he was suffering from gout and administered injections.

Still in pain the following season, Kaline saw an orthopedic surgeon who prescribed corrective shoes. "I feel so much better than I did before, that it's ridiculous", Kaline said by June 1965. Sportswriter Milton Gross described Kaline's deformed foot, saying, "The pinky and middle finger don't touch the ground. The fourth toe is stretched. The second and third are shortened. The first and third toes overlap the second and the fourth is beginning to overlap the big toe, which has begun to bend to the left. It is hard to believe, but for all of his career with the Tigers while he has been called the perfect player, Kaline has bordered on being a cripple."

In 1966, Kaline tied his career high with 29 home runs. In the summer of 1967, the normally calm Kaline broke a bone in his hand when he struck a baseball bat against a bat rack. Kaline missed a month of play. When he returned, the Tigers were in a four-team pennant race, but the team finished the season one game behind the first place Boston Red Sox.

Kaline missed two months of the 1968 season with a broken arm, but he returned to the lineup when Tiger manager Mayo Smith benched shortstop Ray Oyler and sent center fielder Mickey Stanley to play shortstop to make room for Kaline in the outfield. ESPN later called Smith's move one of the ten greatest coaching decisions of the century. In the 1968 World Series, the St. Louis Cardinals won three of the first four games of the series and were leading Game 5 by a score of 3–2 in the seventh inning, when Kaline hit a bases loaded single to drive in two runs. The Tigers won that game, and then won Game 6 in a blowout. Kaline had two hits, two runs scored and three RBI in the Tigers' 10-run third inning of Game 6. Detroit went on to win Game 7 for their first world championship since 1945. In his only World Series appearance, Kaline hit .379 with two home runs and eight RBIs in seven games. For their victory, Kaline and his teammates each received bonus checks of $10,000 (at a time when Kaline's salary was "about $70,000").

The 1969 Tigers could not repeat the magic of their World Series triumph. They won 90 games but still finished 19 games behind the Baltimore Orioles in the newly-formed American League East division. Kaline hit .272 with 21 home runs in 131 games. It was the last season of his career that he reached 20 homers.

=== Final seasons ===
In 1970, Kaline sustained a freak, near-fatal injury in an outfield collision. In a game at Milwaukee's County Stadium on May 30, against the Milwaukee Brewers, Kaline collided with center fielder Jim Northrup as they both pursued a fly ball. Kaline fell to the warning track and immediately began to choke; on impact, his jaw had gotten locked and his tongue obstructed his breathing. Alertly, left fielder Willie Horton rushed over and pried opened Kaline's mouth, clearing his airway and likely saving his life. Kaline was carried out on a stretcher and spent the night in hospital as a precaution. Later on, he said that he could not remember the incident.

After hitting .294 in 1971, Kaline became the first Tiger to sign a $100,000 ($794,988 in today's dollars) contract. He had turned down a pay raise from $95,000 to $100,000 the previous year, saying he did not feel like he deserved it after hitting .278 with 16 home runs in 1970. Detroit contended all season for the 1972 pennant, trailing the Red Sox by a half-game before a series against them to end the regular season. Kaline batted eight times in two games, registering five hits and three runs scored. Detroit won those first two games and clinched the AL East pennant. Kaline batted .313 in 106 games in 1972, topping .300 for the first time since 1967. The Tigers lost the 1972 American League Championship Series to the Oakland Athletics that year after Reggie Jackson stole home in the decisive fifth game of the series. In March 1973, Kaline won the Roberto Clemente Award in recognition of the honor he brought to baseball on and off the field.

On September 24, 1974, Kaline became the 12th player in MLB history to reach the 3,000 hit milestone, when he hit a double off the Orioles' Dave McNally. After reaching the milestone, Kaline announced that he would retire at season's end. "I'm glad it's over. I really am. I don't think I'll miss it. I may miss spring training", Kaline said after his last game on October 3, 1974. In his final major league season, he was used exclusively as a designated hitter, batting .262 with 13 home runs.

Kaline finished his career with 3,007 hits (then 11th on the all-time list, currently 32nd), 498 doubles, 75 triples, 399 home runs (still a Tigers record as of 2024 and currently 58th on the all-time list), 1,622 runs scored, 1,277 bases on balls, and 1,582 RBIs (currently 44th on the all-time list). He batted over .300 nine times in his career to finish with a lifetime batting average of .297 and hit 25 or more home runs seven times in his career. Kaline also holds Tiger career records for games played (2,834), walks (1,277), and sacrifice flies (104). He had more walks than strikeouts (1,020). Kaline was a good pinch hitter in his career, batting .311 (37-for-119) in that capacity with two home runs and 23 RBI. His highest season strikeout total came in his final season, with 75. Prior to that, Kaline never struck out more than 66 times in a season. Among position players, Kaline ranks 29th all-time (15th among outfielders) in Wins Against Replacement (WAR) with a career mark of 92.8.

Defensively, Kaline finished his career with an overall .987 fielding percentage. In his first full season (1954), he recorded 16 outfield assists, including three in one game (July 7 against the Chicago White Sox). He recorded 84 outfield assists between 1954 and 1958, posting a career-high 23 in 1958. After that season, baserunners rarely tested his arm, and his assist numbers dropped.

== Honors ==
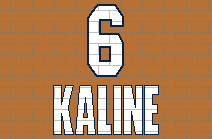
Al Kaline's number 6 was retired by the Detroit Tigers in 1980.

Kaline was elected to the Baseball Hall of Fame in 1980, becoming the tenth player in history to be inducted in his first year of eligibility. He was named on 340 of the 385 ballots (88.3%) cast by sportswriters. Kaline and Duke Snider were the only candidates elected by the sportswriters in 1980. Kaline later said, "I really never thought I would choose an individual thing that happened just to me over a team thing like the World Series. But I would have to say this is the biggest thing that has ever happened to me."

Kaline was honored by the Tigers as the first of their players to have his uniform number (6) retired. Versatile and well-rounded, he won ten Gold Glove Awards (1957–59 and 1961–67) for excellence in the field and appeared in the All-Star game 15 times (1955–67, 1971, 1974).

In 1999, Kaline was ranked number 76 on The Sporting News list of the 100 Greatest Baseball Players, and was nominated as a finalist for the Major League Baseball All-Century Team. In 2020, The Athletic ranked Kaline at number 51 on its "Baseball 100" list, complied by sportswriter Joe Posnanski.

In 2022, as part of their SN Rushmore project, The Sporting News named Kaline on their "Detroit Mount Rushmore of Sports", along with Detroit Red Wings hockey player Gordie Howe, Detroit Lions football player Barry Sanders, and Detroit Pistons basketball player Isiah Thomas.

Cherry Street, which ran behind the left-field stands at Tiger Stadium, was renamed Kaline Drive in his honor in 1970. On September 27, 1999, when Detroit played its last game at Tiger Stadium against the Kansas City Royals, Kaline was invited to appear in uniform and present the last lineup card to the umpires. He did so along with George Brett, former Kansas City Royals' great and fellow Hall of Famer.

Kaline was regarded as a well-rounded player by his contemporaries. Baltimore Orioles third baseman Brooks Robinson said of him, "There have been a lot of great defensive players. The fella who could do everything is Al Kaline. He was just the epitome of what a great outfielder is all about – great speed, catches the ball and throws the ball well." Manager Billy Martin once said, "I have always referred to Al Kaline as 'Mister Perfection'. He does it all — hitting, fielding, running, throwing — and he does it with that extra touch of brilliancy that marks him as a super ballplayer... Al fits in anywhere, at any position in the lineup and any spot in the batting order."

The 1993 Major League Baseball All-Star Game was dedicated to Kaline on the occasion of the 35th anniversary of his hometown's only other Midsummer Classic. Kaline, along with Leon Day and former Baltimore Orioles star Brooks Robinson, threw out the ceremonial first pitch to end the pregame ceremonies. Kaline's ceremonial first pitch was caught by future Detroit Tiger Ivan Rodriguez, who was starting his All-Star debut.

== Post-playing career ==
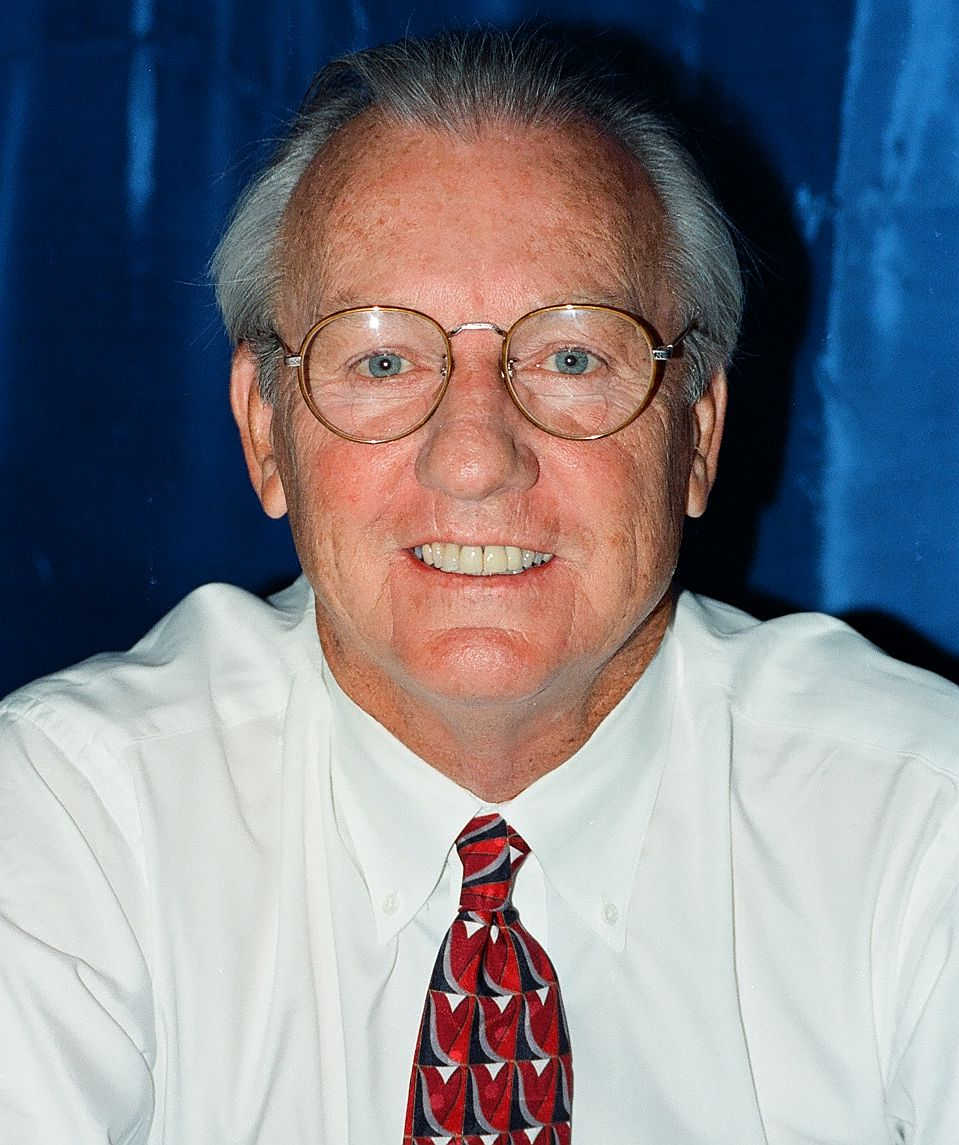
Kaline in 1995

After his playing career, Kaline lived in the Detroit area, also maintaining a house in Florida, and he remained active within the Tigers organization, serving first as a color commentator on the team's television broadcasts (1975–2002) mostly with play by play announcer and former Tiger and fellow Hall of Famer George Kell, and then later as a consultant to the team. Starting in 2003, Kaline served as a special assistant to Tigers President/CEO/General Manager Dave Dombrowski, and his duties included coaching/mentoring outfielders during spring training. Former Tigers teammate Willie Horton also holds this position, and the two threw out the first pitch of the 2006 World Series at Comerica Park. Kaline continued in his assistant role until his death in 2020. His 67 years with one team was one of the longest tenures in MLB history.

Because of his lengthy career and longtime association with the Tigers organization, Kaline's nickname was "Mr. Tiger." Kaline's grandson Colin Kaline was selected by the Tigers in the 25th round of the 2007 MLB draft. He did not sign, choosing to play baseball at Florida Southern College. The team drafted him again in the 2011 MLB draft, this time in the 26th round. He played in the low minor leagues with the Detroit organization in 2011–12.

== Personal life ==
Kaline married his high school sweetheart, Madge Louise Hamilton, in 1954. He had two sons, Mark Albert Kaline (b. August 21, 1957) and Michael Keith Kaline (b. 1962). Michael played college baseball at Miami University and is the father of Colin Kaline, who had a short Minor League career and was a college coach.

Kaline died in his home in Bloomfield Hills, Michigan, on April 6, 2020; the cause of death was not reported.

== See also ==
- List of Gold Glove Award winners at outfield
- List of Major League Baseball batting champions
- List of Major League Baseball career doubles leaders
- List of Major League Baseball career hits leaders
- List of Major League Baseball career home run leaders
- List of Major League Baseball career runs scored leaders
- List of Major League Baseball career runs batted in leaders
- List of Major League Baseball career total bases leaders
- List of Major League Baseball players who spent their entire career with one franchise
- List of Major League Baseball retired numbers
- List of baseball players who went directly to Major League Baseball
