= Lee Tannehill =

American baseball player (1880–1938)

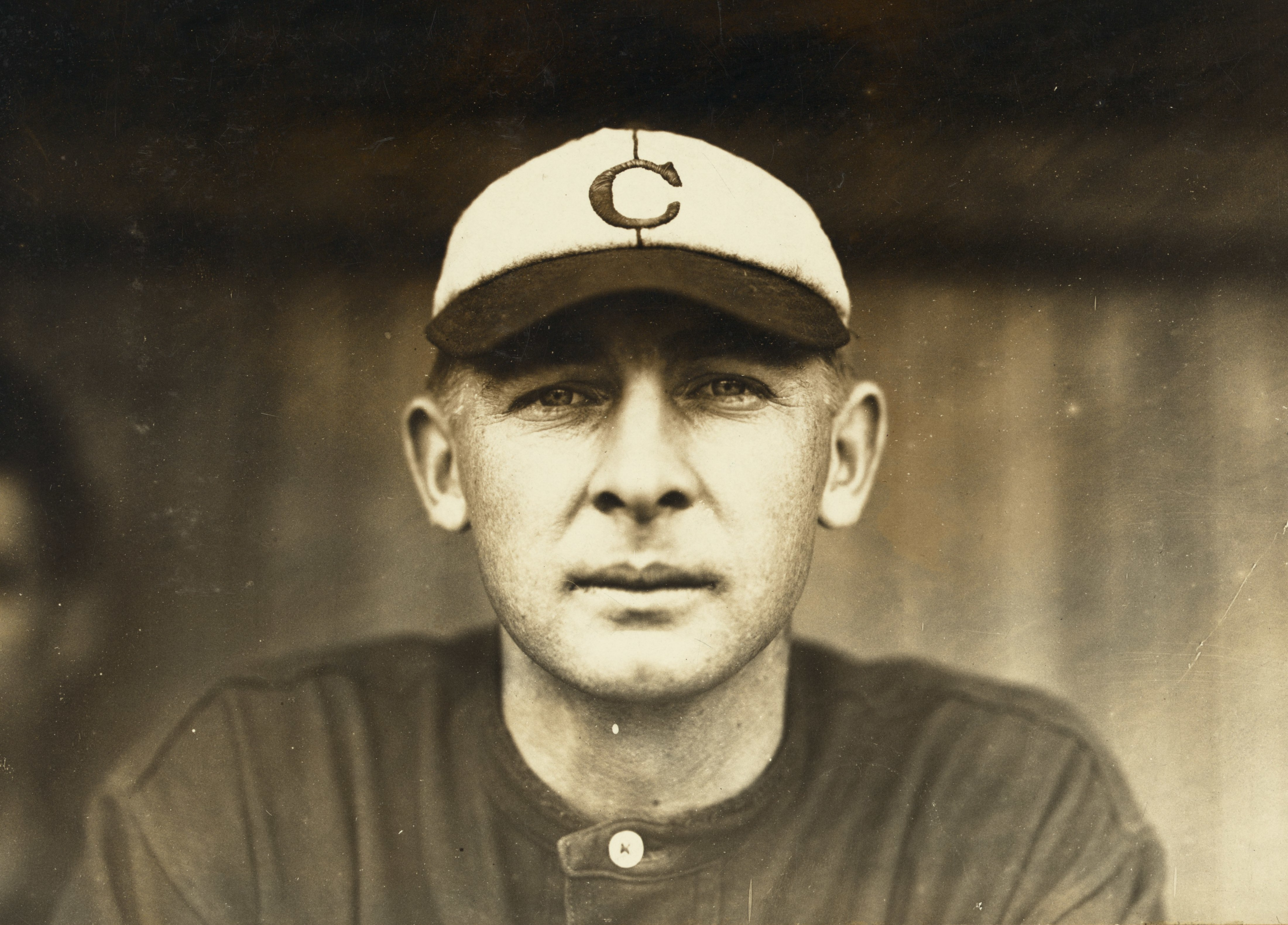
- Third baseman / Shortstop
- Born: October 26, 1880; Dayton, Kentucky, U.S.
- Died: February 16, 1938 (aged 57); Live Oak, Florida, U.S.
- Batted: Right Threw: Right

MLB debut
- April 22, 1903, for the Chicago White Stockings

Last MLB appearance
- May 8, 1912, for the Chicago White Sox

MLB statistics
- Batting average: .220
- Home runs: 3
- Runs batted in: 346
- Stats at Baseball Reference

Teams
- Chicago White Stockings / White Sox (1903–1912)

Career highlights and awards
- World Series champion (1906)

Lee Ford Tannehill (October 26, 1880 – February 16, 1938) was an American professional baseball player. He played all or part of ten seasons in Major League Baseball, from 1903 until 1912, for the Chicago White Sox, primarily as a third baseman and shortstop. He was the brother of the pitcher Jesse Tannehill. He was the first player to hit a home run in Comiskey Park.

== See also ==
- List of Major League Baseball players who spent their entire career with one franchise
