= 1980 Baseball Hall of Fame balloting =

Elections to the Baseball Hall of Fame

National Baseball

Hall of Fame and Museum
- New inductees: 4
- via BBWAA: 2
- via Veterans Committee: 2
- Total inductees: 173
- Induction date: August 3, 1980

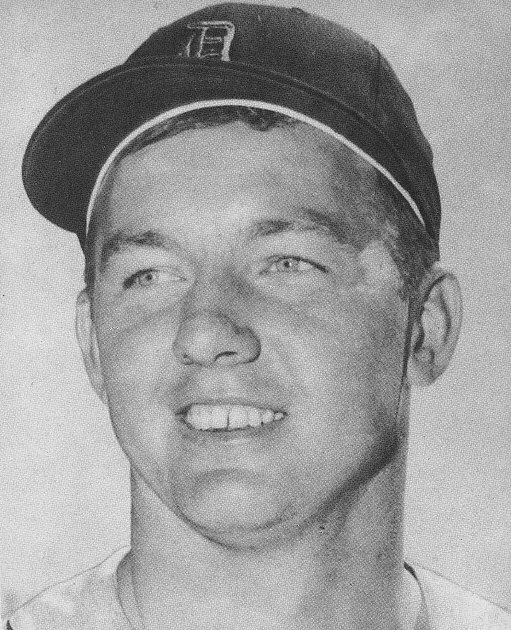
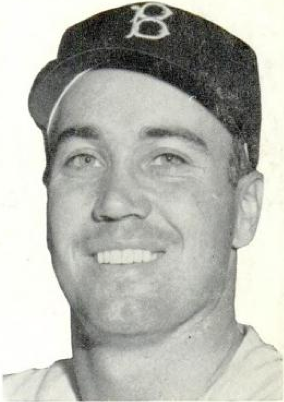
1980 BBWAA inductees Al Kaline (left) and Duke Snider

Elections to the Baseball Hall of Fame for 1980 followed the system in place since 1978. The Baseball Writers' Association of America (BBWAA) voted by mail to select from recent major league players and elected Al Kaline and Duke Snider. The Veterans Committee met in closed sessions to consider older major league players as well as managers, umpires, executives, and figures from the Negro leagues. It selected outfielder Chuck Klein and Boston Red Sox owner Tom Yawkey, both deceased. A formal induction ceremony was held in Cooperstown, New York, on August 3, 1980, with Commissioner of Baseball Bowie Kuhn presiding.

== BBWAA election ==
The BBWAA was authorized to elect players active in 1960 or later, but not after 1974; the ballot included candidates from the 1979 ballot who received at least 5% of the vote but were not elected by the BBWAA, along with players whose last appearance was in 1974. As had happened in the 1979 voting, the BBWAA choose to put all eligible first-year candidates on the ballot rather than limiting them to those chosen by a selection committee. All ten-year members of the BBWAA were eligible to vote.

Voters were instructed to cast votes for up to ten candidates; any candidate receiving votes on at least 75% of the ballots would be inducted into the Hall. The ballot consisted of 61 players; a total of 385 ballots were cast, with 289 votes required for election. A total of 2,963 individual votes were cast, an average of 7.70 per ballot. Those candidates receiving less than 5% of the vote would not appear on future BBWAA ballots, but might be considered by the Veterans Committee.

Candidates who were eligible for the first time are indicated here with a dagger (†). The two candidates who received at least 75% of the vote and were elected is indicated in bold italics; candidates who have since been elected in subsequent elections are indicated in italics. The 38 candidates who received less than 5% of the vote, thus becoming ineligible for future BBWAA consideration, are indicated with an asterisk (*).

Mickey Vernon, Don Newcombe and Alvin Dark were on the ballot for the 15th and final time.

Player	Votes	Percent	Change
**Al Kaline**†	340	88.3	-
**Duke Snider**	333	86.5	▲15.2%
Don Drysdale	238	61.8	▲7.9%
Gil Hodges	230	59.7	▲3.7%
Hoyt Wilhelm	209	54.3	▲15.4%
Jim Bunning	177	46.0	▲12.0%
Red Schoendienst	164	42.6	▲5.8%
Nellie Fox	161	41.8	▲1.5%
Maury Wills	146	37.9	▼0.5%
Richie Ashburn	134	34.8	▲4.7%
Luis Aparicio	124	32.2	▲4.4%
Roger Maris	111	28.8	▼0.6%
Mickey Vernon	96	24.9	▲4.5%
Harvey Kuenn	83	21.6	▲7.0%
Lew Burdette	66	17.1	▲4.8%
Don Newcombe	59	15.3	▲3.3%
Ted Kluszewski	50	13.0	▼0.4%
Orlando Cepeda†	48	12.5	-
Alvin Dark	43	11.2	▼7.3%
Bill Mazeroski	33	8.6	▲0.3%
Don Larsen	31	8.1	▼4.2%
Elston Howard	29	7.5	▲0.6%
Roy Face	21	5.5	▲2.6%
Ron Santo†*	15	3.9	-
Norm Cash†*	6	1.6	-
Matty Alou†*	5	1.3	-
Felipe Alou†*	3	0.8	-
Mel Stottlemyre†*	3	0.8	-
Steve Blass†*	2	0.5	-
Jim Hickman†*	1	0.3	-
Sonny Jackson†*	1	0.3	-
Don McMahon†*	1	0.3	-
Jack Aker†*	0	0.0	-
Steve Barber†*	0	0.0	-
Bob Barton†*	0	0.0	-
John Boccabella†*	0	0.0	-
Larry Brown†*	0	0.0	-
Chris Cannizzaro†*	0	0.0	-
Paul Casanova†*	0	0.0	-
Horace Clarke†*	0	0.0	-
Johnny Edwards†*	0	0.0	-
Phil Gagliano†*	0	0.0	-
Jim Gosger†*	0	0.0	-
Jim Ray Hart†*	0	0.0	-
Ron Hunt†*	0	0.0	-
John Kennedy†*	0	0.0	-
Andy Kosco†*	0	0.0	-
Lew Krausse Jr.†*	0	0.0	-
Frank Linzy†*	0	0.0	-
Denis Menke†*	0	0.0	-
Bob Miller†*	0	0.0	-
Norm Miller†*	0	0.0	-
Ivan Murrell†*	0	0.0	-
Juan Pizarro†*	0	0.0	-
Rick Reichardt†*	0	0.0	-
Pete Richert†*	0	0.0	-
Mike Ryan†*	0	0.0	-
Paul Schaal†*	0	0.0	-
Dick Selma†*	0	0.0	-
Duke Sims†*	0	0.0	-
Bob Veale†*	0	0.0	-

Key to colors
Elected to the Hall. These individuals are also indicated in **bold italics**.
Players who were elected in future elections. These individuals are also indicated in plain italics.
Players not yet elected who returned on the 1981 ballot.
Eliminated from future BBWAA voting. These individuals remain eligible for Veterans Committee consideration.

The newly-eligible players included 20 All-Stars, representing a total of 66 All-Star selections. Among the new candidates were 15-time All-Star Al Kaline, 9-time All-Star Ron Santo, 7-time All-Star Orlando Cepeda and 5-time All-Star Mel Stottlemyre. The field included one MVP (Cepeda), and one Rookie of the Year (Cepeda).

The only player who was eligible for the first time but not on the ballot was Dick Green.

== J. G. Taylor Spink Award ==
Bob Broeg (1918–2005) and Tommy Holmes (1903–1975) received the J. G. Taylor Spink Award honoring baseball writers. The awards were voted at the December 1979 meeting of the BBWAA, and included in the summer 1980 ceremonies.

== Ford C. Frick Award ==
Russ Hodges (1910–1971), longtime broadcaster for the New York Giants / San Francisco Giants, well known for his call of Bobby Thomson's "Shot Heard 'Round the World" (The Giants win the pennant! The Giants win the pennant!) was the recipient of the Ford C. Frick Award.
