= Tim Flannery (baseball) =

American baseball player and coach (born 1957)

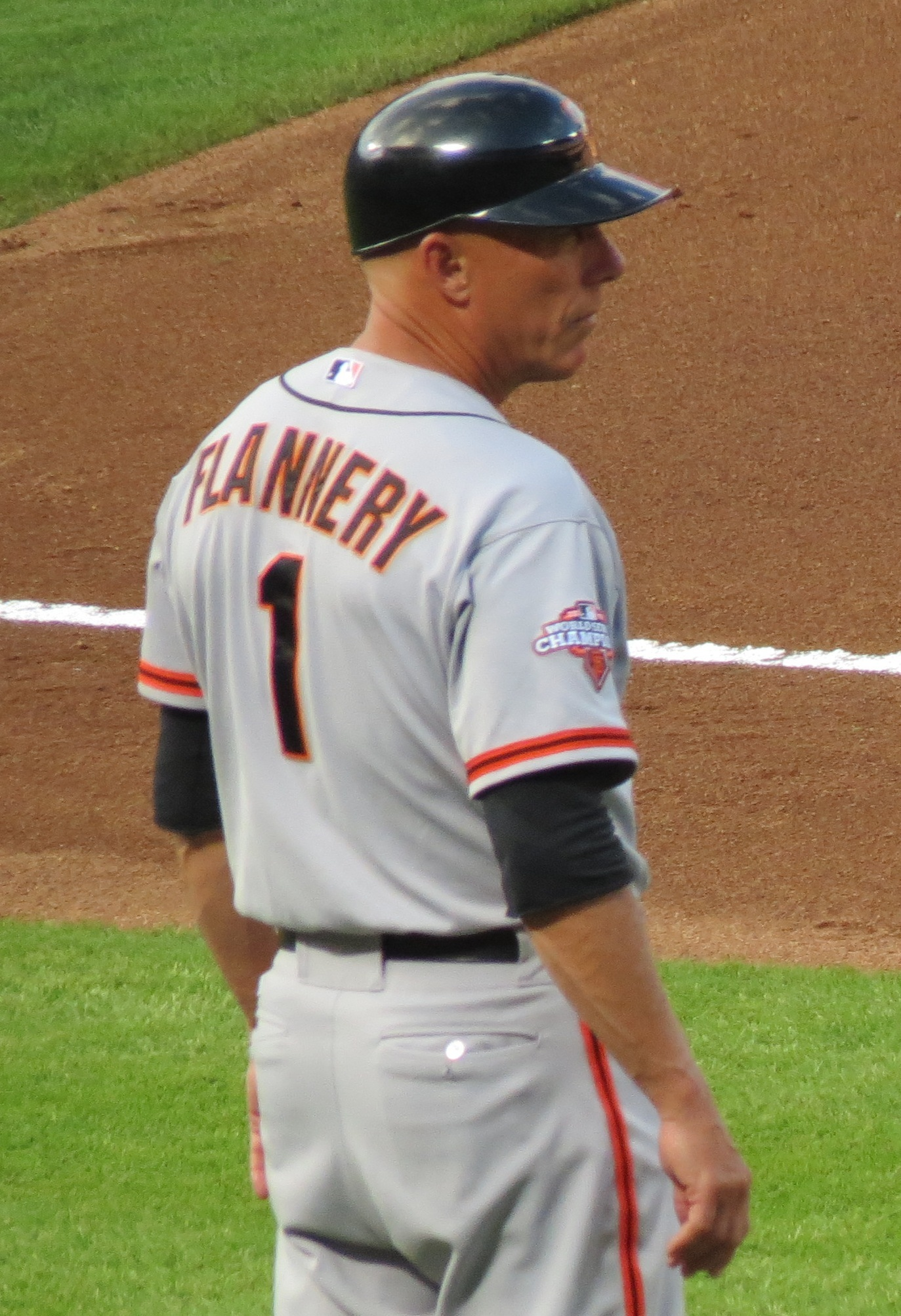
- Flannery with the San Francisco Giants
- Second baseman / Third baseman
- Born: September 29, 1957 (age 69); Tulsa, Oklahoma, U.S.
- Batted: Left Threw: Right

MLB debut
- September 3, 1979, for the San Diego Padres

Last MLB appearance
- September 29, 1989, for the San Diego Padres

MLB statistics
- Batting average: .255
- Home runs: 9
- Runs batted in: 209
- Stats at Baseball Reference

Teams
- As player: San Diego Padres (1979–1989); As coach: San Diego Padres (1996–2002); San Francisco Giants (2007–2014)

Career highlights and awards
- 3× World Series champion (2010, 2012, 2014)

Timothy Earl Flannery (born September 29, 1957) is an American former Major League Baseball player who spent 11 seasons with the San Diego Padres, from 1979 to 1989. He was the third base coach of the San Francisco Giants from 2007 to 2014. He is the nephew of former Major League Baseball player Hal Smith.

== Early life ==
Timothy Earl Flannery was born on September 29, 1957, in Tulsa, Oklahoma. Flannery attended Anaheim High School, in Anaheim, California, where he excelled in baseball, earning all-league honors. He was also elected Homecoming King as a senior.

== College career ==
Flannery attended Chapman University.

== Professional career ==
=== Draft and minor leagues ===
He was drafted in the sixth round of the 1978 Major League Baseball draft by the Padres out of Chapman University in California. Standing at 5'11" tall and weighing 175 lbs., Flannery batted left-handed but threw right-handed.

In his first season in the minors (1978), Flannery batted .350 for the California League Reno Silver Sox. In 1979, he batted .345 with six home runs and 71 runs batted in.

=== San Diego Padres (1979–1989) ===
Flannery in 1984

Flannery received a September call-up to the Majors. Flannery made his Major League debut 26 days before his 22nd birthday, and was the eighth youngest player in the majors in 1979.

He batted lead-off and played second base against the San Francisco Giants at the Padre's Jack Murphy Stadium in his first game on September 3, 1979. Flannery was one for three and drove in the second run of the Padres' 3–0 victory.

His minor league success did not translate to major league success as he hit just .154 in 65 big league at bats, with his only extra base hit of the season being a triple. He split 1980 between the Padres and their triple A affiliate, the Hawaii Islanders. With Hawaii, Flannery batted .346, however, he hit only .240 in the majors that year. In 1981, he only appeared in 37 games and batted .254.

Flannery's first full major league season without spending any time in the minors was 1982. It wasn't until his fifth season, 1983, that Flannery hit his first Major League home run—a solo shot off the Chicago Cubs' Chuck Rainey.

Flannery reached the post-season for the only time in his career in 1984. He made three plate appearances in the 1984 National League Championship Series and reached base all three times. Trailing 3–2 in game four of the series, Flannery hit a lead-off single in the fifth inning, and scored the tying run of the Padres' 7–5 victory over the Cubs. In game five, he reached on a ground ball that trickled through the legs of Cubs first baseman Leon Durham to score the tying run. In his only at-bat in the 1984 World Series, Flannery hit an eighth inning pinch hit single off Jack Morris in game four.

Flannery enjoyed his best year the following season. Having been used all over the infield up to this point in his career, he emerged as the Padres' regular second baseman in 1985. He batted .281 with 40 RBIs and 50 runs scored—all career highs. He was used as a bench player for the majority of his career.

| Seasons | Games | AB | Runs | Hits | 2B | 3B | HR | RBI | SB | BB | SO | Avg. | Slg. | Fld% |
| 11 | 972 | 2473 | 255 | 631 | 77 | 25 | 9 | 209 | 22 | 277 | 293 | .255 | .317 | .977 |

He played his final big league game on his 32nd birthday—September 29, 1989. He spent nine seasons with Eric Show—longer than any other teammate.

=== Fan favorite ===
Though never a star, Flannery was a fan favorite in San Diego for much of his career. Team organist Danny Topaz would greet Flannery's plate appearances with the imposing strains of Wagner's Ride of the Valkyries. His retirement announcement in 1989 resulted in an outpouring of gifts and attention. In his final game, the sellout crowd greeted his first plate appearance with a standing ovation so prolonged that the umpire had to stop play, and following the game, there was discussion on at least one call-in show of whether Flannery's number should be retired.

== Managerial career ==
=== Minor leagues ===
After a two-year hiatus from baseball, he became manager of the Padres' Northwest League affiliate Spokane Indians in 1993. The following season, he led the California League's Rancho Cucamonga Quakes to a 77–59 record, and in 1995, he was handed the reins to the triple A Las Vegas Stars.

== Coaching career ==
=== San Diego Padres (1996–2002) ===
In 1996, he became third base coach for the Padres. He remained with manager Bruce Bochy's coaching staff through 2002.

=== San Francisco Giants (2007–2014) ===
When Bochy was named manager of the San Francisco Giants for the 2007 season, Flannery joined him as third base coach for the Giants, where he coached the Giants through three World Series wins in 2010, 2012, and 2014. He announced his retirement on November 25, 2014, saying "I'm going to send myself home safely."

On Saturday, September 27, 2008, Flannery changed his number to 60 for one game because J. T. Snow came back from retirement and wore number 6. Snow was taken out before the first pitch.

== Broadcasting career ==
From 2004 to 2006, he was a TV and radio broadcaster for the Padres pre- and post-game shows, as well as a color commentator during selected game broadcasts. After he ended his coaching stint with the Giants, he started working for CSN Bay Area as an analyst on Giants Pregame Live and Giants Postgame Live. He was hired as an MLB Network analyst in 2015.

== Personal life ==
He and his wife Donna have a son and two daughters. He is also a bluegrass musician and has released at least a dozen albums since 1997, both solo and with his group, The Lunatic Fringe. He has sung the national anthem with Bob Weir and Phil Lesh of the Grateful Dead several times, including during the 2012 and 2014 playoffs.

== Activism ==
=== Philanthropy ===
Flannery has also held benefit concerts in support of injured Giants fan Bryan Stow. Flannery later founded the Love Harder Project to support other victims of violence.

== See also ==
- List of Major League Baseball players who spent their entire career with one franchise
