= Right fielder =

Defensive position in baseball

The position of the right fielder

A right fielder, abbreviated RF, is the outfielder in baseball or softball who plays defense in right field. Right field is the area of the outfield to the right of a person standing at home plate and facing towards the pitcher's mound. In the numbering system used to record defensive plays, the right fielder is assigned the number 9.

== Position description ==
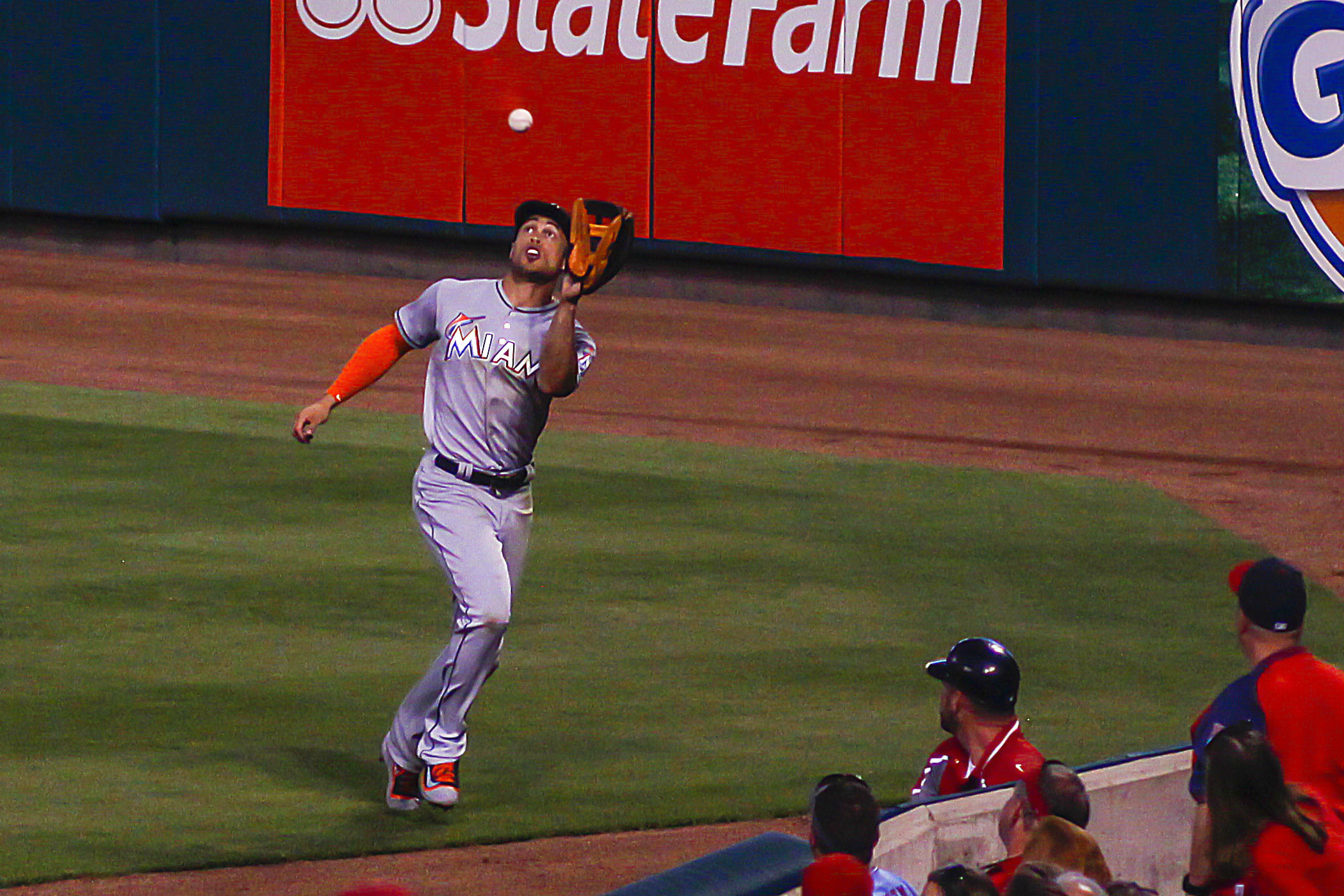
Right fielder Giancarlo Stanton of the New York Yankees, seen here during his tenure with the Miami Marlins, signed (at the time) the richest contract in sports history in 2014.

Outfielders must cover large distances, so speed, instincts and quickness to react to the ball are vital. They must be able to catch fly balls above their head and on the run, as well as prevent balls hit down the right field foul line from getting past them. Being situated 250–300 feet from home plate, they must be able to throw the ball accurately over a long distance to be effective. Of all outfield positions, the right fielder often has the strongest arm, because they are the furthest from third base.

In addition to the requirements above, the right fielder backs up first base on every throw from the catcher and pitcher, when possible, and all bunted balls, since the catcher or the first baseman must be available for fielding the ball. The right fielder backs up second base on any ball thrown from the left side of the field, i.e. shortstop, third base, or foul line territory. The right fielder backs up first base when the first baseman is in a run down between 3rd base and home.

Right field has developed a reputation in Little League for being a position where weaker players can be "hidden" from the action. Unlike the Major League level where players routinely hit the ball in all directions and distances, most Little League players do not hit the ball into the outfield on a regular basis. Additionally, since right-handed batters—who tend to hit the ball in the left direction—are far more common than left-handed batters, the left fielder (and to lesser degree the center fielder) tend to have much more opportunities to make a play than the right fielder.

== Popular culture ==
The reputation of right field being a position for unathletic players was further brought into the mainstream by children's entertainer, picture book author and recording artist Willy Welch's song "Playing Right Field", which was popularized by Peter, Paul and Mary as simply "Right Field" for their 1986 album No Easy Walk to Freedom, and as a Pizza Hut commercial in 1990. Both the song and commercial feature an awkward Little League player bored out in right field. When the batter hits a ball and the right fielder (to everyone's surprise) makes a successful catch, it breaks the stigma that right fielders are weaker players.

In the children's comic strip Peanuts, Lucy Van Pelt is the right fielder on Charlie Brown's team, and she often misses catches or gets distracted from the game.

== Hall of Fame right fielders ==
- Hank Aaron
- Roberto Clemente
- Sam Crawford
- Kiki Cuyler
- Andre Dawson
- Elmer Flick
- Vladimir Guerrero
- Tony Gwynn
- Harry Heilmann
- Harry Hooper
- Reggie Jackson
- Al Kaline
- Willie Keeler
- King Kelly
- Chuck Klein
- Tommy McCarthy
- Mel Ott
- Dave Parker
- Sam Rice
- Babe Ruth
- Frank Robinson
- Enos Slaughter
- Ichiro Suzuki
- Sam Thompson
- Larry Walker
- Paul Waner
- Dave Winfield
- Ross Youngs

== See also ==
- Baseball Hall of Fame
- Gold Glove Award
- Outfielder
