= List of Major League Baseball players who spent their entire career with one franchise =

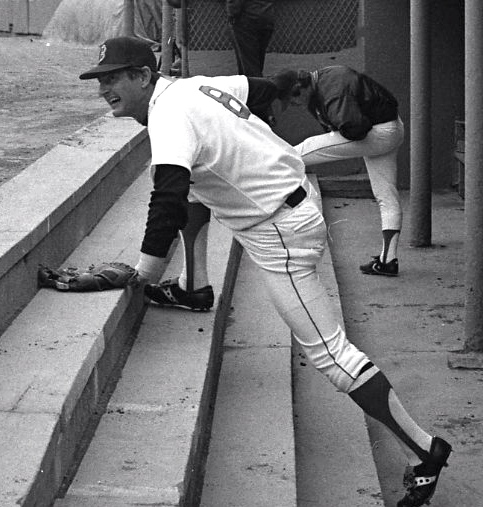
Carl Yastrzemski played in Major League Baseball for 23 seasons, all with the Boston Red Sox.

The following is a list of former Major League Baseball (MLB) players who played in at least 10 MLB seasons and spent their entire MLB playing careers exclusively with one franchise. In most cases, this means the player only appeared with one team; there are also players whose team was relocated (e.g. the Athletics) or had a name change (e.g. the Angels) during their career. Some listed players subsequently went on to coach or manage with other teams, or may have had minor league or foreign league appearances with other franchises. Some listed players had their careers ended by accidents, such as Roberto Clemente, who died in a 1972 airplane crash, and Roy Campanella, who was paralyzed in a 1958 automobile accident.

As of July 2026, 194 players have completed the feat, of which the New York Yankees have had the most, with 26. The San Francisco Giants have had the most in the National League, with 15. Bid McPhee and Mike Tiernan, both of whom played exclusively in the 19th century, were the first two players to do so. Brooks Robinson and Carl Yastrzemski share the distinction of the longest tenure with a single team, 23 seasons with the Baltimore Orioles and Boston Red Sox, respectively. (Note: The record for most major-league seasons played is 27, shared by Nolan Ryan (1966–1993, with four franchises) and Cap Anson (1871–1897, with three franchises).) Mel Ott and Stan Musial share the distinction of the longest tenure with a single team in the National League, having played 22 seasons with the New York Giants and St. Louis Cardinals, respectively. Clayton Kershaw, who played 18 seasons with the Los Angeles Dodgers and retired at the end of the 2025 World Series, is the most recent player to complete a career of at least 10 seasons with one team.

== Players ==
Only players who are no longer active are listed here. This list does not include active players, or free agents who have not yet retired (such players are listed below). A player is considered "inactive" if he has not played baseball for one year or has announced his retirement.

Key
| Seasons | Total seasons played |
| Years | Years played |
| † | Member of the Baseball Hall of Fame |

| Player | Team | Seasons | Years | Ref. |
|---|---|---|---|---|
| Gene Alley | Pittsburgh Pirates | 11 | 1963–1973 | |
| Bob Allison | Washington Senators/Minnesota Twins | 13 | 1958–1970 | |
| Luke Appling^{†} | Chicago White Sox | 20 | 1930–1943, 1945–1950 | |
| Joe Astroth | Philadelphia Athletics/Kansas City Athletics | 10 | 1945–1946, 1949–1956 | |
| Jerry Augustine | Milwaukee Brewers | 10 | 1975–1984 | |
| Jeff Bagwell^{†} | Houston Astros | 15 | 1991–2005 | |
| Ernie Banks^{†} | Chicago Cubs | 19 | 1953–1971 | |
| Johnny Bench^{†} | Cincinnati Reds | 17 | 1967–1983 | |
| Bruce Benedict | Atlanta Braves | 12 | 1978–1989 | |
| Carson Bigbee | Pittsburgh Pirates | 11 | 1916–1926 | |
| Craig Biggio^{†} | Houston Astros | 20 | 1988–2007 | |
| Charlie Blackmon | Colorado Rockies | 14 | 2011–2024 | |
| Ray Blades | St. Louis Cardinals | 10 | 1922–1928, 1930–1932 | |
| Steve Blass | Pittsburgh Pirates | 10 | 1964, 1966–1974 | |
| Ossie Bluege | Washington Senators | 18 | 1922–1939 | |
| Ryan Braun | Milwaukee Brewers | 14 | 2007–2020 | |
| Al Brazle | St. Louis Cardinals | 10 | 1943, 1946–1954 | |
| George Brett^{†} | Kansas City Royals | 21 | 1973–1993 | |
| Tommy Bridges | Detroit Tigers | 16 | 1930–1943, 1945–1946 | |
| Gates Brown | Detroit Tigers | 13 | 1963–1975 | |
| Randy Bush | Minnesota Twins | 12 | 1982–1993 | |
| Matt Cain | San Francisco Giants | 13 | 2005–2017 | |
| Roy Campanella^{†} | Brooklyn Dodgers | 10 | 1948–1957 | |
| Bill Carrigan | Boston Americans/Red Sox | 10 | 1906, 1908–1916 | |
| Spud Chandler | New York Yankees | 11 | 1937–1947 | |
| Larry Christenson | Philadelphia Phillies | 11 | 1973–1983 | |
| Roberto Clemente^{†} | Pittsburgh Pirates | 18 | 1955–1972 | |
| Joe Collins | New York Yankees | 10 | 1948–1957 | |
| Earle Combs^{†} | New York Yankees | 12 | 1924–1935 | |
| Dave Concepción | Cincinnati Reds | 19 | 1970–1988 | |
| Frankie Crosetti | New York Yankees | 17 | 1932–1948 | |
| John Danks | Chicago White Sox | 10 | 2007–2016 | |
| Harry Danning | New York Giants | 10 | 1933–1942 | |
| Rich Dauer | Baltimore Orioles | 10 | 1976–1985 | |
| Hooks Dauss | Detroit Tigers | 15 | 1912–1926 | |
| Jim Davenport | San Francisco Giants | 13 | 1958–1970 | |
| Bill Dickey^{†} | New York Yankees | 17 | 1928–1943, 1946 | |
| Dom DiMaggio | Boston Red Sox | 11 | 1940–1942, 1946–1953 | |
| Joe DiMaggio^{†} | New York Yankees | 13 | 1936–1942, 1946–1951 | |
| Gary DiSarcina | California/Anaheim Angels | 12 | 1989–2000 | |
| Bobby Doerr^{†} | Boston Red Sox | 14 | 1937–1944, 1946–1951 | |
| Don Drysdale^{†} | Brooklyn/Los Angeles Dodgers | 14 | 1956–1969 | |
| Danny Duffy | Kansas City Royals | 11 | 2011–2021 | |
| Carl Erskine | Brooklyn/Los Angeles Dodgers | 12 | 1948–1959 | |
| Andre Ethier | Los Angeles Dodgers | 12 | 2006–2017 | |
| Red Faber^{†} | Chicago White Sox | 20 | 1914–1933 | |
| Bob Feller^{†} | Cleveland Indians | 18 | 1936–1941, 1945–1956 | |
| Tim Flannery | San Diego Padres | 11 | 1979–1989 | |
| Whitey Ford^{†} | New York Yankees | 16 | 1950, 1953–1967 | |
| Dick Fowler | Philadelphia Athletics | 10 | 1941–1942, 1945–1952 | |
| Bill Freehan | Detroit Tigers | 15 | 1961, 1963–1976 | |
| Carl Furillo | Brooklyn/Los Angeles Dodgers | 15 | 1946–1960 | |
| Jim Gantner | Milwaukee Brewers | 17 | 1976–1992 | |
| Brett Gardner | New York Yankees | 14 | 2008–2021 | |
| Scott Garrelts | San Francisco Giants | 10 | 1982–1991 | |
| Lou Gehrig^{†} | New York Yankees | 17 | 1923–1939 | |
| Charlie Gehringer^{†} | Detroit Tigers | 19 | 1924–1942 | |
| Patsy Gharrity | Washington Senators | 10 | 1916–1923, 1929–1930 | |
| Jake Gibbs | New York Yankees | 10 | 1962–1971 | |
| Bob Gibson^{†} | St. Louis Cardinals | 17 | 1959–1975 | |
| Jim Gilliam | Brooklyn/Los Angeles Dodgers | 14 | 1953–1966 | |
| Alex Gordon | Kansas City Royals | 14 | 2007–2020 | |
| Jack Graney | Cleveland Napoleons/Indians | 14 | 1908, 1910–1922 | |
| Dick Green | Kansas City/Oakland Athletics | 12 | 1963–1974 | |
| Mike Greenwell | Boston Red Sox | 12 | 1985–1996 | |
| Orval Grove | Chicago White Sox | 10 | 1940–1949 | |
| Ron Guidry | New York Yankees | 14 | 1975–1988 | |
| Tony Gwynn^{†} | San Diego Padres | 20 | 1982–2001 | |
| Stan Hack | Chicago Cubs | 16 | 1932–1947 | |
| Mel Harder | Cleveland Indians | 20 | 1928–1947 | |
| Terry Harmon | Philadelphia Phillies | 10 | 1967, 1969–1977 | |
| Todd Helton^{†} | Colorado Rockies | 17 | 1997–2013 | |
| Tommy Henrich | New York Yankees | 11 | 1937–1942, 1946–1950 | |
| Félix Hernández | Seattle Mariners | 15 | 2005–2019 | |
| Bobby Higginson | Detroit Tigers | 11 | 1995–2005 | |
| John Hiller | Detroit Tigers | 15 | 1965–1970, 1972–1980 | |
| Ron Hodges | New York Mets | 12 | 1973–1984 | |
| Chris Hoiles | Baltimore Orioles | 10 | 1989–1998 | |
| Ryan Howard | Philadelphia Phillies | 13 | 2004–2016 | |
| Kent Hrbek | Minnesota Twins | 14 | 1981–1994 | |
| Carl Hubbell^{†} | New York Giants | 16 | 1928–1943 | |
| Fred Hutchinson | Detroit Tigers | 11 | 1939–1940, 1946–1953 | |
| Travis Jackson^{†} | New York Giants | 15 | 1922–1936 | |
| Derek Jeter^{†} | New York Yankees | 20 | 1995–2014 | |
| Walter Johnson^{†} | Washington Senators | 21 | 1907–1927 | |
| Chipper Jones^{†} | Atlanta Braves | 19 | 1993, 1995–2012 | |
| Arndt Jorgens | New York Yankees | 11 | 1929–1939 | |
| Al Kaline^{†} | Detroit Tigers | 22 | 1953–1974 | |
| Ron Karkovice | Chicago White Sox | 12 | 1986–1997 | |
| Clayton Kershaw | Los Angeles Dodgers | 18 | 2008–2025 | |
| Sandy Koufax^{†} | Brooklyn/Los Angeles Dodgers | 12 | 1955–1966 | |
| Ed Kranepool | New York Mets | 18 | 1962–1979 | |
| Ray Kremer | Pittsburgh Pirates | 10 | 1924–1933 | |
| Barry Larkin^{†} | Cincinnati Reds | 19 | 1986–2004 | |
| Vern Law | Pittsburgh Pirates | 16 | 1950–1951, 1954–1967 | |
| Sam Leever | Pittsburgh Pirates | 13 | 1898–1910 | |
| Bob Lemon^{†} | Cleveland Indians | 15 | 1941–1942, 1946–1958 | |
| Dennis Leonard | Kansas City Royals | 12 | 1974–1983, 1985–1986 | |
| Buddy Lewis | Washington Senators | 11 | 1935–1941, 1945–1947, 1949 | |
| Ted Lyons^{†} | Chicago White Sox | 21 | 1923–1942, 1946 | |
| Mickey Mantle^{†} | New York Yankees | 18 | 1951–1968 | |
| Pepper Martin | St. Louis Cardinals | 13 | 1928, 1930–1940, 1944 | |
| Edgar Martínez^{†} | Seattle Mariners | 18 | 1987–2004 | |
| Don Mattingly | New York Yankees | 14 | 1982–1995 | |
| Joe Mauer^{†} | Minnesota Twins | 15 | 2004–2018 | |
| Bill Mazeroski^{†} | Pittsburgh Pirates | 17 | 1956–1972 | |
| Gil McDougald | New York Yankees | 10 | 1951–1960 | |
| Scott McGregor | Baltimore Orioles | 13 | 1976–1988 | |
| Bid McPhee^{†} | Cincinnati Red Stockings/Reds | 18 | 1882–1899 | |
| Clyde Milan | Washington Senators | 16 | 1907–1922 | |
| Bob Miller | Philadelphia Phillies | 10 | 1949–1958 | |
| Otto Miller | Brooklyn Superbas/Dodgers/Robins | 13 | 1910–1922 | |
| Yadier Molina | St. Louis Cardinals | 19 | 2004–2022 | |
| Bob Montgomery | Boston Red Sox | 10 | 1970–1979 | |
| Jo-Jo Moore | New York Giants | 12 | 1930–1941 | |
| Terry Moore | St. Louis Cardinals | 11 | 1935–1942, 1946–1948 | |
| Bob Moose | Pittsburgh Pirates | 10 | 1967–1976 | |
| Guy Morton | Cleveland Napoleons/Indians | 11 | 1914–1924 | |
| Johnny Mostil | Chicago White Sox | 10 | 1918, 1921–1929 | |
| Pat Mullin | Detroit Tigers | 10 | 1940–1941, 1946–1953 | |
| Thurman Munson | New York Yankees | 11 | 1969–1979 | |
| Stan Musial^{†} | St. Louis Cardinals | 22 | 1941–1944, 1946–1963 | |
| Mike Norris | Oakland Athletics | 10 | 1975–1983, 1990 | |
| Ron Oester | Cincinnati Reds | 13 | 1978–1990 | |
| Tony Oliva^{†} | Minnesota Twins | 15 | 1962–1976 | |
| Mel Ott^{†} | New York Giants | 22 | 1926–1947 | |
| Tom Pagnozzi | St. Louis Cardinals | 12 | 1987–1998 | |
| Jim Palmer^{†} | Baltimore Orioles | 19 | 1965–1967, 1969–1984 | |
| Mel Parnell | Boston Red Sox | 10 | 1947–1956 | |
| Dustin Pedroia | Boston Red Sox | 14 | 2006–2019 | |
| Glen Perkins | Minnesota Twins | 12 | 2006–2017 | |
| Rico Petrocelli | Boston Red Sox | 13 | 1963, 1965–1976 | |
| Biff Pocoroba | Atlanta Braves | 10 | 1975–1984 | |
| Jorge Posada | New York Yankees | 17 | 1995–2011 | |
| Buster Posey | San Francisco Giants | 12 | 2009–2019, 2021 | |
| Kirby Puckett^{†} | Minnesota Twins | 12 | 1984–1995 | |
| Brad Radke | Minnesota Twins | 12 | 1995–2006 | |
| Pee Wee Reese^{†} | Brooklyn/Los Angeles Dodgers | 16 | 1940–1942, 1946–1958 | |
| Jim Rice^{†} | Boston Red Sox | 16 | 1974–1989 | |
| J. R. Richard | Houston Astros | 10 | 1971–1980 | |
| Bobby Richardson | New York Yankees | 12 | 1955–1966 | |
| Cal Ripken Jr.^{†} | Baltimore Orioles | 21 | 1981–2001 | |
| Mariano Rivera^{†} | New York Yankees | 19 | 1995–2013 | |
| Phil Rizzuto^{†} | New York Yankees | 13 | 1941–1942, 1946–1956 | |
| Brooks Robinson^{†} | Baltimore Orioles | 23 | 1955–1977 | |
| Jackie Robinson^{†} | Brooklyn Dodgers | 10 | 1947–1956 | |
| Steve Rogers | Montreal Expos | 13 | 1973–1985 | |
| Red Rolfe | New York Yankees | 10 | 1931, 1934–1942 | |
| Eddie Rommel | Philadelphia Athletics | 13 | 1920–1932 | |
| Al Rosen | Cleveland Indians | 10 | 1947–1956 | |
| Nap Rucker | Brooklyn Superbas/Dodgers/Robins | 10 | 1907–1916 | |
| Bill Russell | Los Angeles Dodgers | 18 | 1969–1986 | |
| Tim Salmon | California/Anaheim/Los Angeles Angels | 14 | 1992–2004, 2006 | |
| Mike Schmidt^{†} | Philadelphia Phillies | 18 | 1972–1989 | |
| Hal Schumacher | New York Giants | 13 | 1931–1942, 1946 | |
| Mike Scioscia | Los Angeles Dodgers | 13 | 1980–1992 | |
| Kyle Seager | Seattle Mariners | 11 | 2011–2021 | |
| Scot Shields | Anaheim/Los Angeles Angels | 10 | 2001–2010 | |
| Sibby Sisti | Boston Bees/Braves/Milwaukee Braves | 13 | 1939–1942, 1946–1954 | |
| Vic Sorrell | Detroit Tigers | 10 | 1928–1937 | |
| Mario Soto | Cincinnati Reds | 12 | 1977–1988 | |
| Paul Splittorff | Kansas City Royals | 15 | 1970–1984 | |
| Mike Squires | Chicago White Sox | 10 | 1975, 1977–1985 | |
| Bob Stanley | Boston Red Sox | 13 | 1977–1989 | |
| Mickey Stanley | Detroit Tigers | 15 | 1964–1978 | |
| Willie Stargell^{†} | Pittsburgh Pirates | 21 | 1962–1982 | |
| Mel Stottlemyre | New York Yankees | 11 | 1964–1974 | |
| Stephen Strasburg | Washington Nationals | 13 | 2010–2022 | |
| Pete Suder | Philadelphia Athletics/Kansas City Athletics | 13 | 1941–1943, 1946–1955 | |
| Lee Tannehill | Chicago White Stockings/White Sox | 10 | 1903–1912 | |
| Bill Terry^{†} | New York Giants | 14 | 1923–1936 | |
| Robby Thompson | San Francisco Giants | 11 | 1986–1996 | |
| Mike Tiernan | New York Giants | 13 | 1887–1899 | |
| Chris Tillman | Baltimore Orioles | 10 | 2009–2018 | |
| Alan Trammell^{†} | Detroit Tigers | 20 | 1977–1996 | |
| Cecil Travis | Washington Senators | 12 | 1933–1941, 1945–1947 | |
| Pie Traynor^{†} | Pittsburgh Pirates | 17 | 1920–1935, 1937 | |
| Jason Varitek | Boston Red Sox | 15 | 1997–2011 | |
| Joey Votto | Cincinnati Reds | 17 | 2007–2023 | |
| Adam Wainwright | St. Louis Cardinals | 18 | 2005–2010, 2012–2023 | |
| John Wathan | Kansas City Royals | 10 | 1976–1985 | |
| Bill Wegman | Milwaukee Brewers | 11 | 1985–1995 | |
| Wes Westrum | New York Giants | 11 | 1947–1957 | |
| Lou Whitaker | Detroit Tigers | 19 | 1977–1995 | |
| Frank White | Kansas City Royals | 18 | 1973–1990 | |
| Roy White | New York Yankees | 15 | 1965–1979 | |
| Bernie Williams | New York Yankees | 16 | 1991–2006 | |
| Ted Williams^{†} | Boston Red Sox | 19 | 1939–1942, 1946–1960 | |
| Larry Woodall | Detroit Tigers | 10 | 1920–1929 | |
| David Wright | New York Mets | 14 | 2004–2016, 2018 | |
| Carl Yastrzemski^{†} | Boston Red Sox | 23 | 1961–1983 | |
| Ross Youngs^{†} | New York Giants | 10 | 1917–1926 | |
| Robin Yount^{†} | Milwaukee Brewers | 20 | 1974–1993 | |
| Ryan Zimmerman | Washington Nationals | 16 | 2005–2019, 2021 | |

=== Ambiguous ===
- Bug Holliday played 10 seasons for the Cincinnati Reds franchise, from 1889 to 1898, appearing in 930 games. During the 1885 World Series, one of several pre-modern World Series held from 1884 to 1890, Holliday played in one game for the Chicago White Stockings of the National League (today's Chicago Cubs). This was Holliday's only major-league appearance for a franchise other than Cincinnati. As MLB considers the first World Series to have been the 1903 edition, some baseball sites list Holliday as having only played for a single franchise.

=== Negro league baseball ===
- While Roy Campanella, Jim Gilliam, Jackie Robinson each only played for a single team within Major League Baseball (hence their inclusion in the above list), each also played for other teams now considered major-league within Negro league baseball: Campanella and Gilliam with the Baltimore Elite Giants and Robinson with the Kansas City Monarchs.
- Within Negro league baseball, Buck Leonard and Bullet Rogan each had careers in excess of a decade with a single major-league team, the Homestead Grays and Kansas City Monarchs, respectively.

== Counts by franchise ==
Table last updated July 19, 2026.

| Team name | Past name(s) | Player count | Players |
|---|---|---|---|
| Arizona Diamondbacks | — | 0 | — |
| Atlanta Braves | Milwaukee Braves; Boston Braves; Boston Bees | 4 | Bruce Benedict, Chipper Jones, Biff Pocoroba, Sibby Sisti |
| Baltimore Orioles | St. Louis Browns; Milwaukee Brewers (1901) | 7 | Rich Dauer, Chris Hoiles, Scott McGregor, Jim Palmer, Cal Ripken Jr., Brooks Robinson, Chris Tillman |
| Boston Red Sox | Boston Americans | 13 | Bill Carrigan, Dom DiMaggio, Bobby Doerr, Mike Greenwell, Bob Montgomery, Mel Parnell, Dustin Pedroia, Rico Petrocelli, Jim Rice, Bob Stanley, Jason Varitek, Ted Williams, Carl Yastrzemski |
| Chicago Cubs | Chicago Orphans; Chicago Colts; Chicago White Stockings (1870–89) | 2 | Ernie Banks, Stan Hack |
| Chicago White Sox | Chicago White Stockings | 9 | Luke Appling, John Danks, Red Faber, Orval Grove, Ron Karkovice, Ted Lyons, Johnny Mostil, Mike Squires, Lee Tannehill |
| Cincinnati Reds | Cincinnati Redlegs; Cincinnati Red Stockings | 7 | Johnny Bench, Dave Concepción, Barry Larkin, Bid McPhee, Ron Oester, Mario Soto, Joey Votto |
| Cleveland Guardians | Cleveland Indians; Cleveland Naps; Cleveland Broncos; Cleveland Bluebirds | 6 | Bob Feller, Jack Graney, Mel Harder, Bob Lemon, Guy Morton, Al Rosen |
| Colorado Rockies | — | 2 | Charlie Blackmon, Todd Helton |
| Detroit Tigers | — | 15 | Tommy Bridges, Gates Brown, Hooks Dauss, Bill Freehan, Charlie Gehringer, Bobby Higginson, John Hiller, Fred Hutchinson, Al Kaline, Pat Mullin, Vic Sorrell, Mickey Stanley, Alan Trammell, Lou Whitaker, Larry Woodall |
| Houston Astros | Houston Colt .45s | 3 | Jeff Bagwell, Craig Biggio, J. R. Richard |
| Kansas City Royals | — | 7 | George Brett, Danny Duffy, Alex Gordon, Dennis Leonard, Paul Splittorff, John Wathan, Frank White |
| Los Angeles Angels | California Angels; Anaheim Angels; Los Angeles Angels of Anaheim | 3 | Gary DiSarcina, Tim Salmon, Scot Shields |
| Los Angeles Dodgers | Brooklyn Dodgers; Brooklyn Robins; Brooklyn Superbas | 14 | Roy Campanella, Don Drysdale, Carl Erskine, Andre Ethier, Carl Furillo, Jim Gilliam, Clayton Kershaw, Sandy Koufax, Otto Miller, Pee Wee Reese, Jackie Robinson, Nap Rucker, Bill Russell, Mike Scioscia |
| Miami Marlins | Florida Marlins | 0 | — |
| Milwaukee Brewers | Seattle Pilots | 5 | Jerry Augustine, Ryan Braun, Jim Gantner, Bill Wegman, Robin Yount |
| Minnesota Twins | Washington Senators (1901–60) | 14 | Bob Allison, Ossie Bluege, Randy Bush, Patsy Gharrity, Kent Hrbek, Walter Johnson, Buddy Lewis, Joe Mauer, Clyde Milan, Tony Oliva, Glen Perkins, Kirby Puckett, Brad Radke, Cecil Travis |
| New York Mets | — | 3 | Ron Hodges, Ed Kranepool, David Wright |
| New York Yankees | New York Highlanders; Baltimore Orioles (1901–1902) (Note: The New York Yankees do not include the Baltimore Orioles of 1901–1902 as part of their franchise history.) | 26 | Spud Chandler, Joe Collins, Earle Combs, Frankie Crosetti, Bill Dickey, Joe DiMaggio, Whitey Ford, Brett Gardner, Lou Gehrig, Jake Gibbs, Ron Guidry, Tommy Henrich, Derek Jeter, Arndt Jorgens, Mickey Mantle, Don Mattingly, Gil McDougald, Thurman Munson, Jorge Posada, Bobby Richardson, Mariano Rivera, Phil Rizzuto, Red Rolfe, Mel Stottlemyre, Roy White, Bernie Williams |
| Oakland Athletics | Kansas City Athletics; Philadelphia Athletics | 6 | Joe Astroth, Dick Fowler, Dick Green, Mike Norris, Eddie Rommel, Pete Suder |
| Philadelphia Phillies | Philadelphia Quakers (NL) | 5 | Larry Christenson, Terry Harmon, Ryan Howard, Bob Miller, Mike Schmidt |
| Pittsburgh Pirates | Pittsburgh Alleghenys | 11 | Gene Alley, Carson Bigbee, Steve Blass, Roberto Clemente, Ray Kremer, Vern Law, Sam Leever, Bill Mazeroski, Bob Moose, Willie Stargell, Pie Traynor |
| St. Louis Cardinals | St. Louis Perfectos; St. Louis Browns (NL) | 9 | Ray Blades, Al Brazle, Bob Gibson, Pepper Martin, Yadier Molina, Terry Moore, Stan Musial, Tom Pagnozzi, Adam Wainwright |
| San Diego Padres | — | 2 | Tim Flannery, Tony Gwynn |
| San Francisco Giants | New York Giants | 15 | Matt Cain, Harry Danning, Jim Davenport, Scott Garrelts, Carl Hubbell, Travis Jackson, Jo-Jo Moore, Mel Ott, Buster Posey, Hal Schumacher, Bill Terry, Robby Thompson, Mike Tiernan, Wes Westrum, Ross Youngs |
| Seattle Mariners | — | 3 | Félix Hernández, Edgar Martínez, Kyle Seager |
| Texas Rangers | Washington Senators (1961–71) | 0 | — |
| Tampa Bay Rays | Tampa Bay Devil Rays | 0 | — |
| Toronto Blue Jays | — | 0 | — |
| Washington Nationals | Montreal Expos | 3 | Steve Rogers, Stephen Strasburg, Ryan Zimmerman |

== Active players ==
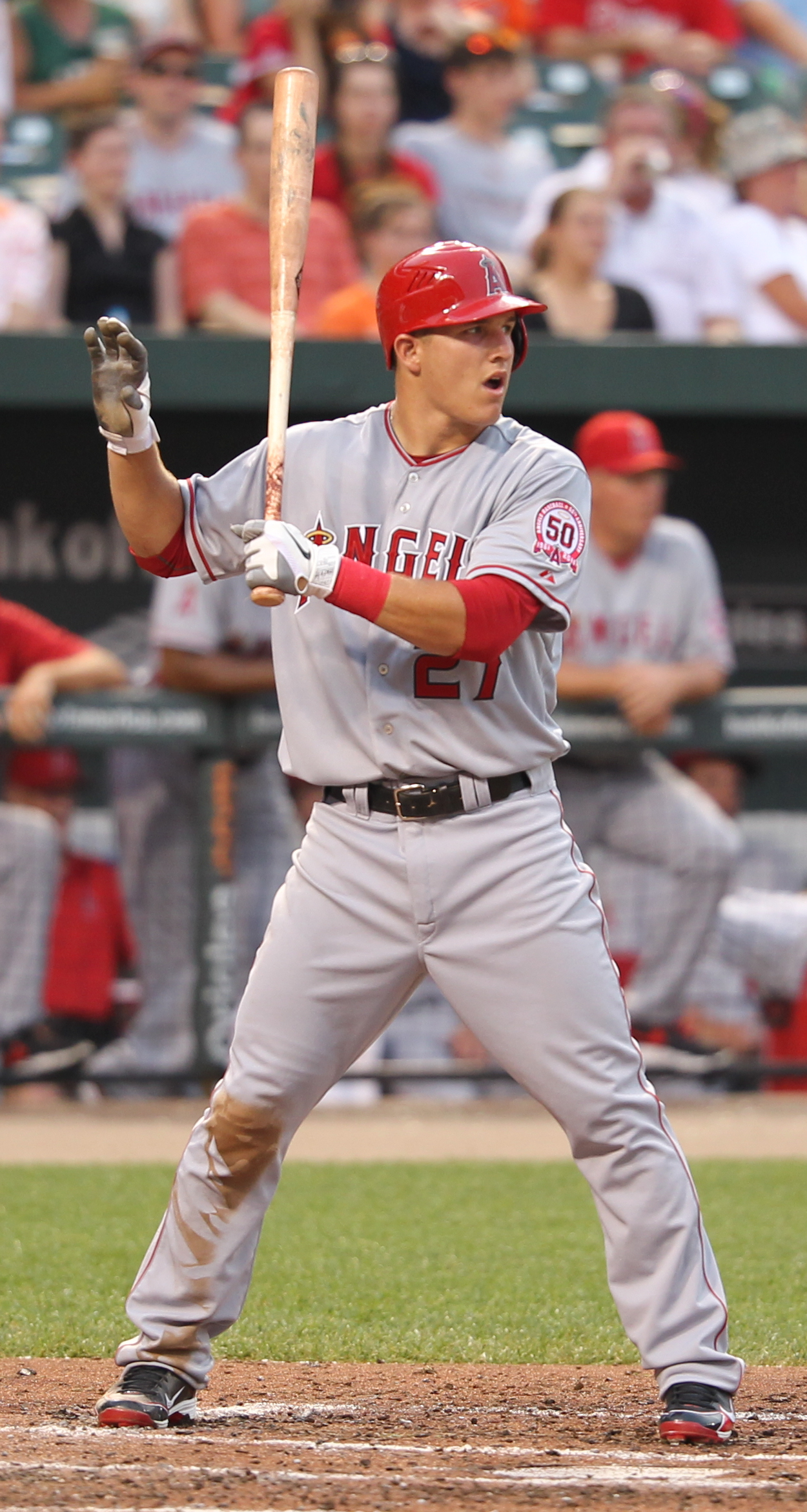
Mike Trout first played for the Los Angeles Angels in 2011.

The following active players have played at least 10 seasons with only a single MLB franchise, making them potential future additions to the main list above.

| Debut year | Player | Team | Seasons with listed team |
|---|---|---|---|
| 2011 | Jose Altuve | Houston Astros | 2011–present |
| 2011 | Salvador Perez | Kansas City Royals | 2011–2018, 2020–present |
| 2011 | Mike Trout | Los Angeles Angels | 2011–present |
| 2013 | José Ramírez | Cleveland Indians / Guardians | 2013–present |
| 2015 | Austin Barnes | Los Angeles Dodgers | 2015–2025† |
| 2015 | Byron Buxton | Minnesota Twins | 2015–present |
| 2015 | Aaron Nola | Philadelphia Phillies | 2015–present |
| 2016 | Aaron Judge | New York Yankees | 2016–present |
| 2017 | Ozzie Albies | Atlanta Braves | 2017–present |
| 2017 | Kyle Freeland | Colorado Rockies | 2017–present |
| 2017 | Ian Happ | Chicago Cubs | 2017–present |

Players are removed from this list (and this article) when they make an appearance with a different MLB team. Players who retire or are inactive for over a year (have not played professional baseball at any level) are moved from this list to the main list.

† Denotes a player who is currently a free agent.
‡ Denotes a player who is currently under contract with a different team, but has yet to play in an MLB game for that team.
# Denotes a player currently playing internationally (outside of the United States and Canada)

== See also ==
- List of NBA players who have spent their entire career with one franchise
- List of NHL players who spent their entire career with one franchise
- List of NFL players who spent their entire career with one franchise
- List of one-club men in association football
- List of one-club men in rugby league
