= Chuck Klein =

American baseball player (1904–1958)

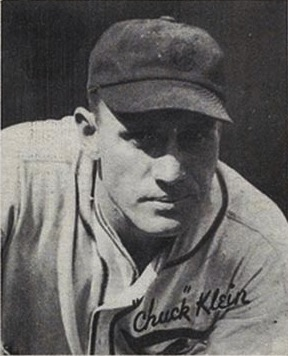
- Klein in 1936
- Right fielder
- Born: October 7, 1904; Indianapolis, Indiana, U.S.
- Died: March 28, 1958 (aged 53); Indianapolis, Indiana, U.S.
- Batted: Left Threw: Right

MLB debut
- July 30, 1928, for the Philadelphia Phillies

Last MLB appearance
- June 1, 1944, for the Philadelphia Phillies

MLB statistics
- Batting average: .320
- Hits: 2,076
- Home runs: 300
- Runs batted in: 1,201
- Stats at Baseball Reference

Teams
- Philadelphia Phillies (1928–1933); Chicago Cubs (1934–1936); Philadelphia Phillies (1936–1939); Pittsburgh Pirates (1939); Philadelphia Phillies (1940–1944)

Career highlights and awards
- 2× All-Star (1933, 1934); NL MVP (1932); Triple Crown (1933); NL batting champion (1933); 4× NL home run leader (1929, 1931–1933); 2× NL RBI leader (1931, 1933); NL stolen base leader (1932); Hit four home runs in one game on July 10, 1936; Philadelphia Phillies jersey retired; Philadelphia Phillies Wall of Fame

Member of the National

Baseball Hall of Fame
- Induction: 1980
- Vote: Veterans Committee

Charles Herbert Klein (October 7, 1904 – March 28, 1958), nicknamed "the Hoosier Hammer" because of his Indiana roots, was an American professional baseball outfielder. Klein played in Major League Baseball (MLB) for the Philadelphia Phillies (1928–1933, 1936–1939, 1940–1944), Chicago Cubs (1934–1936), and Pittsburgh Pirates (1939).

Klein led the National League (NL) in home runs four times, and won the NL Most Valuable Player Award in 1932. In 1933 he became one of six (at the time) NL players to win a batting Triple Crown. In 1930 he set the NL record for extra-base hits with 107. On July 10, 1936, he hit four home runs in a game, becoming the fourth player to do so. He was the first player to be selected to the All-Star Game as a member of two different teams (Phillies and Cubs). Klein was elected to the Baseball Hall of Fame in 1980.

== Early life ==
Klein was born in Indianapolis, Indiana, on October 7, 1904, the son of immigrant farmers Frank and Margaret Klein. After finishing high school at Southport High School, he began working at a steel mill instead of attending college due to his poor grades at school. As a result, Klein's talents were not noticed by the major league clubs until his early 20s. He was picked up by a semi-pro team and played for them for a few years earning $200 a week (equivalent to $3,707 in 2025). The St. Louis Cardinals noticed his talent and signed him to a minor-league contract. Within a year, he worked his way up to the Cardinals' farm team in Fort Wayne, which played in the Class B Central League (roughly equivalent to today's Double-A).

After hitting 26 homers in 88 games in 1928, Klein was slated to be called up to St. Louis midway through the season. However, Baseball Commissioner Kenesaw Mountain Landis discovered that the Cardinals owned a team in Dayton, Ohio, that also played in the Central League with Fort Wayne. Landis ordered the Cardinals to sell off the Fort Wayne team and give up the rights to its players. The Phillies purchased Klein's contract for a sum of $5,000 (equivalent to $93,750 in 2025) and in the process outbid the New York Yankees for Klein's services. Klein joined the Phillies in July.

== MLB career ==
=== Peak years ===
Klein hit .356 in 1929, his first full season, and won the NL home run title. In the middle of the season, the Phillies added a 15-foot screen on top of the short right-field wall of Baker Bowl. The timing was peculiar as Klein was coming off of a torrid July where he hit 14 home runs, and was making a run at the home run record. However, William Baker, the Phillies' notoriously miserly owner, defended the addition of the screen, stating, "a number of accidents happen[ing] on Broad street owing to the balls going over the fence and hitting pedestrians, also damaging automobiles, breaking windshields, etc." For the remainder of the season, due to the new height of the right field wall, Klein only hit 4 home runs in the 25 games he played at Baker Bowl after August 1. In those 25 home games however, he hit 12 doubles. On the last day of the season, the Phillies played a doubleheader against the New York Giants. The Giants' star slugger, Mel Ott, was tied with Klein for the lead with 42. In the first game, Klein homered to put him one ahead of Ott, who was held to a single. In the second game, the Phillies' pitchers walked Ott five straight times, including once with the bases loaded. Early in the 1930 season before their season debut with the Giants, New York press acknowledged that Klein's home run record was tainted, because of what happened with Ott in the last game the previous season. "He calls me the pop fly home run champ." Klein said in referring to Ott. "Say, I can hit a ball farther with one hand than that little runt can with two. Bring on those Giants. I'll eat them up!"

In 1930, Klein enjoyed one of the best offensive years in baseball history, batting .386 with 250 hits and 158 runs scored, all career highs. He also set career bests and still-standing Phillies records with 59 doubles, 170 runs batted in (RBI), a .687 slugging percentage and 445 total bases. No player has had as many total bases in a season since. His 107 extra-base hits that year are a National League record, tied by Barry Bonds in 2001. Along with his batting prowess, Klein was also a good defensive right fielder; he is tenth on the all-time list for assists for a right fielder. 1930 marked the second straight season where Klein had collected at least 200 hits, along with his hitting records he set the single season mark for assists by a right fielder with 44. This is due to the height that was added to the right field wall in 1929 which caused more balls to fall in right field. On July 1, 1931, in a game against the Chicago Cubs, Klein hit for the cycle, going 4-for-5 with five RBI. At the end of the season, he led the National League in runs scored with 121 and RBI with 121. He also led the league in home runs for the second time in his career with 31, and amassed at least 200 hits for the third season in a row.

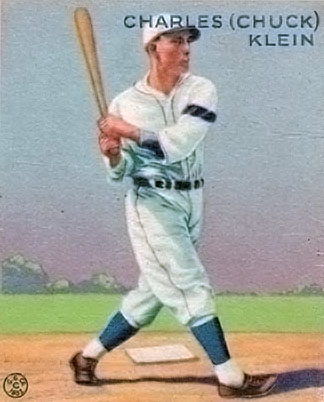
Klein's 1933 Goudey baseball card

After the 1932 season, Klein was awarded the National League MVP award. During the season, he led the league in home runs for the third time, as well as hits and runs scored, he also became the first player in the live-ball era to lead the league in both home runs and stolen bases. No player since has led the league in both categories in the same year. He finished the season with 226 hits, marking the fourth year in a row that he exceeded the 200 hit mark. On May 26, 1933, the Phillies lost a 14 inning game to the St. Louis Cardinals, during this game Klein hit for the cycle for the second time in his career. On July 6, 1933, he became the first Phillies player ever to bat in an All-Star Game after receiving a majority of the fans’ votes. At the end of the season, he became the fourth NL player since 1901 to win the Triple Crown with a batting average of .368, and led the NL in home runs with 28 and RBI with 120. At the end of the season, due in part to Carl Hubbell's brilliant pitching season, and the Giants winning the 1933 World Series, Klein finished second in MVP voting behind Hubbell.

Chuck Klein was honored alongside the retired numbers of the Philadelphia Phillies in 2001.

=== Later career ===
On November 21, 1933, Klein was traded to the Cubs for $65,000 (equivalent to $1,616,645 in 2025) and three other players, Klein hit 20 and 21 home runs in his two full seasons with the Cubs (1934, 1935) and batted .301 and .293 in those seasons respectively. As good as those numbers were, they were nowhere near what Klein had posted in Philadelphia, leading to claims that he would not have hit nearly as many homers had he not played in notoriously hitter-friendly Baker Bowl. He reached the World Series for the only time in 1935 against the Detroit Tigers. He pinch-hit in three of the first four games (which included scoring the game-tying run in Game 3) before starting Game 5 and Game 6. He had a two-run home run in Game 5 to keep Chicago from elimination but had just one hit in Game 6 as the Tigers won the game late to win the series; Klein went 4-for-12 in the Series.

The Phillies reacquired him on May 21, 1936. On July 10, 1936, in the spacious Forbes Field, against the 42-34 Pirates, Klein became the first NL player to hit four home runs in a game in the 20th century, and only the 4th player in major league history to accomplish the feat. His fourth home run that game was a leadoff home run in the top of the tenth inning, the Phillies scored 2 more runs to win the game 9–6 after ten innings. In the middle of the 1938 season, the Phillies relocated to the more spacious Shibe Park.

Klein went to the Pirates during the 1939 season but was back in Philadelphia in 1940 for what proved to be his last year as a regular player. From 1941 onward, he never played in more than 50 games in a season, and was often used as a pinch hitter. In his last eight seasons, from 1937 to 1944, he averaged 69 games played, batted .253 and hit 43 home runs. On August 18, 1941, he hit his 300th career home run as a pinch-hitter in the 9th inning, which proved to be the last home run of his career; only six other players had achieved 300 home runs for a career at the time. He retired midway through the 1944 season after getting one hit in seven at-bats.

== Later life ==
After retiring, he owned and operated a bar in Kensington, Philadelphia, until 1947. He endured some difficult financial times, largely due to a drinking problem. He would later suffer a stroke which left one leg paralyzed. By 1947, Klein was living with his brother, and his wife in Indianapolis, Indiana. He died there in 1958.

== Legacy ==
In his 17-year major league career, Klein played in 1,753 games, batted .320, with 1,201 RBI, 1,168 runs, 2,076 hits, 398 doubles, 74 triples, 300 home runs, .379 on-base percentage, .543 slugging percentage, and an OPS of .922. Klein was known for exploiting the Phillies home park, the Baker Bowl, and its short right field wall. In his career he hit for a .395 average and slugged 164 home runs in only 581 career games at the Baker Bowl. Klein recorded five five-hit games, 36 four-hit games in his career and 28 multi-home run games.

After never receiving more than 28% on the ballot, a campaign was started to get Klein elected to the Baseball Hall of Fame via the Veterans Committee. He was elected to the Baseball Hall of Fame in 1980 via the Veterans Committee. Richard Nixon listed Klein on his all-time baseball team. In 1999, he ranked number 92 on The Sporting News' list of the 100 Greatest Baseball Players, and was a nominee for the Major League Baseball All-Century Team.

As with another Philadelphia legend from the pre-numbers era of baseball, Grover Cleveland Alexander, the Phillies simply honored Klein with his name and an Old English-style "P" where a retired uniform number would go on the outfield wall of Veterans Stadium. The Phillies began using numbers in 1932, and in that season and 1933, Klein wore number 3. He was then traded to the Chicago Cubs, and when he returned to the Phillies in 1936, he wore 32 (later retired by the Phillies for Steve Carlton), and soon switched to 36 (later retired by the Phillies for Robin Roberts) for that season and 1937. In 1938, he wore number 1 (later retired by the Phillies for Richie Ashburn), wore 26 and then 14 (later retired by the Phillies for Jim Bunning) in 1939, wore 29 in 1940 and 1941, 3 again in 1942, 8 in 1943 and 26 again in 1944, his last major league season.

== See also ==
- Philadelphia Phillies award winners and league leaders
- List of Major League Baseball single-game home run leaders
- List of Major League Baseball players to hit for the cycle
- List of Major League Baseball home run records
- List of Major League Baseball doubles records
- List of Major League Baseball career home run leaders
- List of Major League Baseball career hits leaders
- List of Major League Baseball career runs scored leaders
- List of Major League Baseball career runs batted in leaders
- List of Major League Baseball annual runs batted in leaders
- List of Major League Baseball batting champions
- List of Major League Baseball annual home run leaders
- List of Major League Baseball annual runs scored leaders
- List of Major League Baseball annual stolen base leaders
- List of Major League Baseball annual doubles leaders
- Major League Baseball titles leaders
- Major League Baseball Triple Crown

Awards and achievements
Preceded by Babe Herman; Pepper Martin	Hitting for the cycle July 1, 1931; May 26, 1933	Succeeded by Babe Herman; Arky Vaughan
Preceded by Rogers Hornsby	National League Triple Crown; 1933	Succeeded by Joe Medwick
Preceded by Lou Gehrig	Batters with 4 home runs in one game July 10, 1936	Succeeded by Pat Seerey
