= Pat Mullin =

American baseball player (1917–1999)

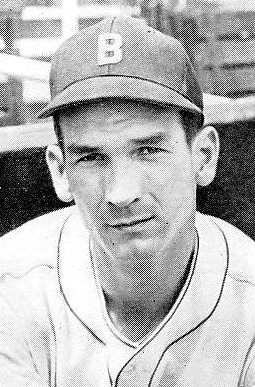
- Mullin in 1940
- Outfielder
- Born: November 1, 1917; Fayette County, Pennsylvania, U.S.
- Died: August 14, 1999 (aged 81); Brownsville, Pennsylvania, U.S.
- Batted: Left Threw: Right

MLB debut
- September 18, 1940, for the Detroit Tigers

Last MLB appearance
- September 27, 1953, for the Detroit Tigers

MLB statistics
- Batting average: .271
- Home runs: 87
- Runs batted in: 385
- Stats at Baseball Reference

Teams
- Detroit Tigers (1940–1941, 1946–1953)

Career highlights and awards
- 2× All-Star (1947, 1948)

Patrick Joseph Mullin (November 1, 1917 – August 14, 1999) was an American Major League Baseball outfielder for the Detroit Tigers from 1940 to 1941 and 1946 to 1953. Born in Trotter, near Connellsville in Fayette County, Pennsylvania, Mullin was signed by the Tigers before the 1937 season as a 19-year-old amateur free agent. A left-handed hitter who threw right-handed, Mullin was listed at 6 ft 2 in (1.88 m) and 190 pounds (86 kg).

Mullin reached the major leagues at age 22 in the final week of the 1940 season, going hitless in four at bats. The Tigers won the American League pennant in 1940, however Mullin did not play in the World Series.

He started the 1941 season in the minor leagues with the Buffalo Bisons, then was brought up midseason, making a big impression, batting .345 with a .400 on-base percentage and a .509 slugging percentage. In just 54 games, Mullin had 76 hits, scored 42 runs, with 21 extra base hits.

Based on his performance in 1941, Mullin appeared to be a rising star. However, World War II intervened and Mullin joined the United States Army, missing four full seasons during the prime of his athletic life from ages 25–28.

Mullin returned to the Tigers after the war in 1946 and became a solid performer. His best seasons were 1947 and 1948, the only seasons he played in more than 110 games. In 1947, Mullin was among the American League leaders with 28 doubles and 49 extra base hits. He was elected to the American League All Star Team and finished the 1947 season with a .459 on-base percentage, a .470 slugging percentage and an OPS (on-base plus slugging) rating of .829.

In 1948, Mullin was again chosen for the All Star Team. He finished the 1948 campaign with a .385 on-base percentage (driven by 143 hits and 77 bases on balls) and a .504 slugging percentage—8th best in the AL. His OPS rating in 1948 was .889 OPS—7th best in the AL behind the likes of Hall of Famers Ted Williams, Joe DiMaggio, and Lou Boudreau. Mullin was also among the 1948 league leaders in triples (22), home runs (23), and at bats per home run (21.6).

After the 1948 season, Mullin played largely as a reserve outfielder and left-handed hitting pinch hitter. On June 26, 1949, Mullin hit three home runs in a single game. Mullin had 57 pinch hitting appearances in 1953, retiring at the end of the season, a month shy of his 36th birthday. In ten major league seasons, Mullin played in 834 games for the Tigers, 637 as an outfielder and the rest as a pinch hitter. He finished with a career .271 batting average, 676 hits, 87 home runs and 385 RBIs, a .358 on-base percentage, .453 slugging percentage, and .811 OPS rating. He finished his career with a .970 fielding percentage playing at all three outfield positions.

Mullin remained in baseball after his playing days ended as a scout, minor league manager and (from mid-1963 through 1966) first-base coach for the Tigers, and a coach for the Cleveland Indians (1967) and Montreal Expos (1979–81).

He died at age 81 in Brownsville, Pennsylvania, and is buried at Lafayette Memorial Park, in Brownsville, Pennsylvania.

== See also ==
- List of Major League Baseball players who spent their entire career with one franchise
