= 2008 Baseball Hall of Fame balloting =

Elections to the Baseball Hall of Fame

National Baseball

Hall of Fame and Museum
- New inductees: 6
- via BBWAA: 1
- via Veterans Committee: 5
- Total inductees: 286
- Induction date: July 27, 2008

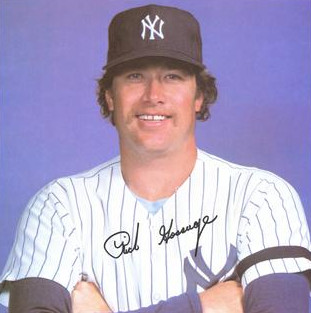
2008 BBWAA inductee Goose Gossage

Elections to the Baseball Hall of Fame for 2008 proceeded according to revised rules enacted in 2001 and further revamped in 2007. The Baseball Writers' Association of America (BBWAA) held an election to select from among recent players, resulting in the induction of Goose Gossage. A restructured format for Veterans Committee voting resulted in the first successful election by that body since 2001, with five candidates earning induction, after the three elections in the intervening years had failed to produce any inductees. Selected by the Veterans Committee were former managers Billy Southworth and Dick Williams, and former executives Barney Dreyfuss, Bowie Kuhn, and Walter O'Malley.

Initially, the Veterans Committee was not scheduled to hold an election; the 2001 rules changes provided that elections for players retired over 20 years would be held every other year, with elections of non-players (managers, umpires and executives) held every fourth year. The Committee voted in 2007 in both areas, and an election for players was next held in 2009. Under the 2001 rules, the next election for non-players would have been conducted in 2011; however, the 2007 changes meant that elections of non-players would now be conducted for inductions in even-numbered years beginning in 2008, with managers and umpires elected from one ballot and executives from a separate ballot.

Induction ceremonies in Cooperstown, New York, were held on July 27, with Commissioner of Baseball Bud Selig presiding. This was to be the final year that the annual Hall of Fame Game, an exhibition contest played in Cooperstown, would be held; however, the game was rained out.

== BBWAA election ==
The BBWAA was again authorized to elect players active in 1988 or later, but not after 2002; the ballot, announced on November 26, 2007, included candidates from the 2007 ballot who received at least 5% of the vote but were not elected, along with selected players, chosen by a screening committee, whose last appearance was in 2002. All 10-year members of the BBWAA were eligible to vote.

Voters were instructed to cast votes for up to 10 candidates; any candidate who received votes on at least 75% of the ballots would be honored with induction to the Hall. Results of the 2008 election by the BBWAA were announced on January 8. The ballot consisted of 25 players, and over 575 ballots were distributed; they had to be returned by December 31, and votes were tabulated by BBWAA official Jack O'Connell along with Michael DiLecce, a partner in the Ernst & Young accounting firm. 543 ballots were cast (including 3 ballots which supported no candidates), two short of the record total of 2007, with 408 votes required for election. A total of 2,907 individual votes were cast, an average of 5.35 per ballot. Those candidates who received less than 5% of the vote will not appear on future BBWAA ballots, but may eventually be considered by the Veterans Committee.

Candidates who were eligible for the first time are indicated here with a dagger (†). Fourteen candidates returned from the 2007 ballot. The candidate who received at least 75% of the vote and was elected is indicated in bold italics; candidates who have since been selected in subsequent elections are indicated in italics. The candidates who received less than 5% of the vote, thus becoming ineligible for future BBWAA consideration, are indicated with an asterisk (*).

Dave Concepción was on the ballot for the 15th and final time.

Player	Votes	Percent	Change	Year
**Goose Gossage**	**466**	**85.8**	▲14.6%	9th
Jim Rice	392	72.2	▲8.7%	14th
Andre Dawson	358	65.9	▲9.2%	7th
Bert Blyleven	336	61.9	▲14.2%	11th
Lee Smith	235	43.3	▲3.5%	6th
Jack Morris	233	42.9	▲5.8%	9th
Tommy John	158	29.1	▲6.2%	14th
Tim Raines†	132	24.3	–	1st
Mark McGwire	128	23.6	▲0.1%	2nd
Alan Trammell	99	18.2	▲4.8%	7th
Dave Concepción	88	16.2	▲2.6%	15th
Don Mattingly	86	15.8	▲5.9%	8th
Dave Parker	82	15.1	▲3.7%	12th
Dale Murphy	75	13.8	▲4.6%	10th
Harold Baines	28	5.2	▼0.1%	2nd
Rod Beck†*	2	0.4	–	1st
Travis Fryman†*	2	0.4	–	1st
Robb Nen†*	2	0.4	–	1st
Shawon Dunston†*	1	0.2	–	1st
Chuck Finley†*	1	0.2	–	1st
David Justice†*	1	0.2	–	1st
Chuck Knoblauch†*	1	0.2	–	1st
Todd Stottlemyre†*	1	0.2	–	1st
Brady Anderson†*	0	0.0	–	1st
José Rijo†*	0	0.0	–	1st

Key
	Elected to the Hall of Fame on this ballot (named in **bold italics**).
	Elected subsequently, as of 2026 (named in plain italics).
	Renominated for the 2009 BBWAA election by adequate performance on this ballot and has not been elected, as of 2026.
	Eliminated from annual BBWAA consideration by poor performance or expiration on this ballot and has not been elected, as of 2026.
†	First time on the BBWAA ballot.
*	Eliminated from annual BBWAA consideration by poor performance or expiration on this ballot.

The newly eligible candidates included 17 All-Stars, eight of whom were not included on the ballot, with only one (Tim Raines, with seven) who was selected more than five times. In contrast to the remarkably deep field of candidates in 2007, when those newly eligible had been named to the All-Star team a combined total of 103 times, the 2008 field of new candidates were selected a total of only 43 times. José Rijo, who appeared on the 2001 ballot before returning to the major leagues in 2001–2002, again became eligible. Darryl Kile, who died during the 2002 season, was included on the 2003 ballot under a standard provision for players who die before the five-year waiting period has elapsed; this same provision allowed Rod Beck (who played his last game in 2004 but died in 2007) to appear on the 2008 ballot.

The ballot included two Rookie of the Year Award winners: David Justice and Chuck Knoblauch.

Players eligible for the first time who were not included on the ballot were: Luis Alicea, Alex Arias, Andy Benes, Mike Benjamin, Dennis Cook, Delino DeShields, Darrin Fletcher, Rich Garcés, Chris Haney, Dave Hollins, Bobby J. Jones, Tom Lampkin, Darren Lewis, Mike Magnante, Dave Mlicki, Mike Morgan, Hipólito Pichardo, Armando Reynoso, Henry Rodríguez, Lee Stevens, Greg Swindell, Mike Trombley, John Valentin, Randy Velarde, Ed Vosberg, and Mark Wohlers.

Of the newly eligible candidates, the only one who amassed enough votes to remain on the BBWAA ballot was Raines. This contrasts with the 2007 voting, when Cal Ripken Jr. and Tony Gwynn were inducted at the first opportunity, and two other newcomers, Mark McGwire and Harold Baines, received enough votes to remain on the ballot. McGwire, who received 128 votes in 2007, got the same number of votes in 2008. Baines, whose 29 votes in 2007 kept him on the ballot by two votes, lost one vote in 2008, remaining on the ballot with exactly the minimum requirement.

Also notable was Jim Rice falling short of election, this time by 16 votes. He was on the ballot for the 15th and final time in 2009, finally earning induction that year alongside newcomer Rickey Henderson.

== Veterans Committee elections ==
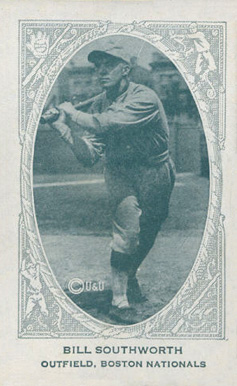
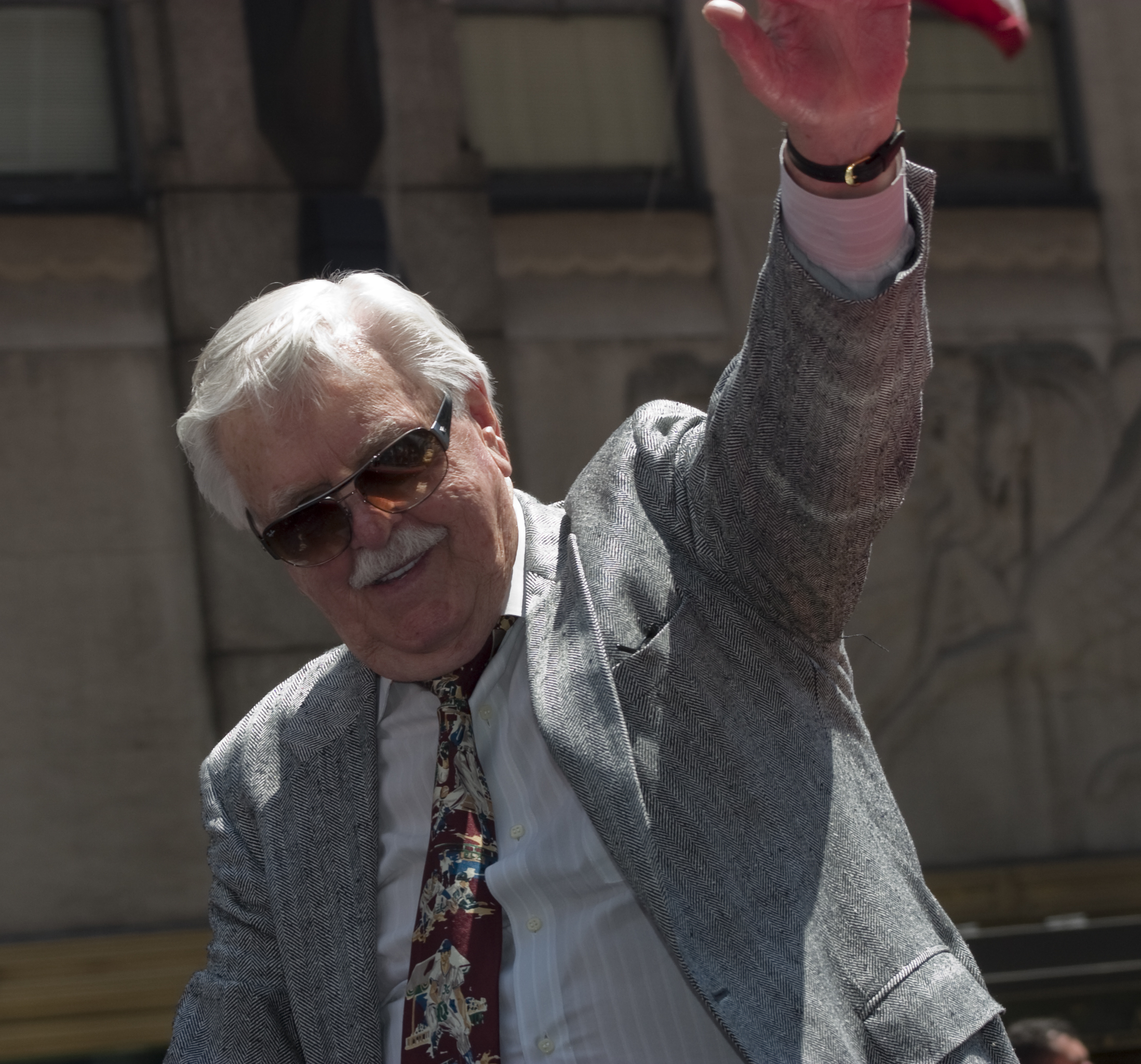
2008 Veterans Committee inductees Billy Southworth (left) and Dick Williams

The Veterans Committee election process, radically changed in 2001, was revamped yet again in July 2007. The changes that most directly affected this election involved elections of non-players (managers, umpires and executives). Under the 2001 rules, elections of non-players would be held every fourth year on a "composite ballot". No candidate was elected from the composite ballot in 2003 or 2007.

With the 2007 rules changes, the composite ballot was split into two separate ballots—one for managers and umpires and the other for executives. Also, the voting membership of the Committee, which previously included all living members of the Hall, was now reduced to include just a handful of those members, plus additional executives and sportswriters (only one of whom had been among the previous electorate). Voting for both the managers/umpires and executives ballots will now take place prior to inductions in even-numbered years, starting with 2008. To be eligible, managers and umpires need to be retired for at least five years, or for at least six months if they are age 65 or older, while executives need to be either retired or at least age 65.

A Historical Overview Committee of eleven sportswriters appointed by the BBWAA's Board of Directors met to develop a ballot of 10 managers and umpires; the committee members were: Dave Van Dyck (Chicago Tribune), Bob Elliott (Toronto Sun), Rick Hummel (St. Louis Post-Dispatch), Steve Hirdt (Elias Sports Bureau), Moss Klein (Newark Star-Ledger), Bill Madden (New York Daily News), Ken Nigro (formerly Baltimore Sun), Jack O'Connell (MLB.com), Nick Peters (The Sacramento Bee), Tracy Ringolsby (Rocky Mountain News) and Mark Whicker (The Orange County Register). The managers/umpires list was submitted to a 16-member panel composed of 10 Hall of Famers (8 players and 2 managers), 3 executives and 3 veteran media members for a final vote. A separate ballot of 10 executives was developed by a 12-member panel including 7 executives, 2 players and 3 writers, which was the same committee which did the final voting in that area. On November 8, 2007, the final ballots were released. Each panel member could vote for up to four individuals on each ballot, and each candidate who received 75% of the vote from either panel would be elected; therefore, a maximum of five inductions was possible from each ballot. Voting was conducted at baseball's winter meetings in Nashville, Tennessee on December 2, 2007, with the results announced on December 3; it was the first time since 2001 that the Committee met to discuss candidates, as the previous three elections had been conducted by mail.

=== Managers/umpires ballot ===
The ballot for managers and umpires included seven managers and three umpires, with 12 votes required for election. Candidates who received at least 75% of the vote and were elected are indicated in bold italics; candidates who have since been elected in later elections are indicated in italics.

Player	Category	Votes	Percent
**Billy Southworth**	Manager	13	81.25%
**Dick Williams**	Manager	13	81.25%
Doug Harvey	Umpire	11	68.75%
Whitey Herzog	Manager	11	68.75%
Danny Murtaugh	Manager	6	37.5%
Hank O'Day	Umpire	4	25%
Davey Johnson	Manager	<3	
Billy Martin	Manager	<3	
Gene Mauch	Manager	<3	
Cy Rigler	Umpire	<3	

Southworth, who won four National League titles between 1942 and 1948, and Williams, who won American League titles in 1967 and 1972–73 and an NL flag in 1984, had been the only eligible managers with at least four league pennants who had not yet been elected to the Hall; (Note: Joe Torre was eligible for election four times since winning his fourth pennant in 2000, but always in voting for players; he will not be eligible for election primarily as a manager until his retirement.) Southworth's 1,044 career victories, however, were the fewest by any manager yet elected. (Note: Charles Comiskey and Frank Chance, two successful managers of the pre-World War I era, had fewer victories; but although their managing careers likely played a major role in their selections, they were not elected specifically as managers, and both had significant additional accomplishments as players and/or executives. Harry Wright, a Hall member who managed in the 1870s and 1880s, had only 1,000 major league victories, but also earned 225 wins in the National Association from 1871–1875 prior to the establishment of the first major league. Comiskey and Wright also managed at a time when seasons were considerably shorter than during Southworth's career.) The committee members apparently made an effort to vote for as many candidates as they were allowed, casting at least 58 of a possible 64 individual votes (vote totals for four candidates were not released). Herzog, Martin, Williams and Harvey had previously been on the final composite ballot in the 2007 election. Four of the candidates were still living; at the time the ballot was released, Williams was 78, Harvey 77, Herzog a day shy of his 76th birthday, and Johnson 64. Harvey was the only manager or umpire on the ballot who received majority support in 2007, receiving 52 votes from the 81 committee members who voted that year. The leading vote-getter among managers in 2007 was Williams, who received 30 votes; Herzog was just behind at 29. Harvey and Herzog would both live to be inducted in 2010.

The election committee, which was announced on the same day as the ballot, included:

- Hall of Famers: Hank Aaron, Jim Bunning, Bob Gibson, Fergie Jenkins, Al Kaline, Tommy Lasorda, Phil Niekro, Tony Pérez, Earl Weaver, Billy Williams
- Executives: Jim Frey (retired), Roland Hemond, Bob Watson
- Media: Jack O'Connell, Tim Kurkjian, Tom Verducci

At the induction ceremonies, St. Louis Cardinals owner Bill DeWitt gave the speech to accept Southworth's induction.

=== Executives ballot ===
On the executives ballot, 9 votes were required for election; those candidates who received at least 75% of the vote and were elected are indicated in bold italics:

Player	Votes	Percent
**Barney Dreyfuss**	10	83.33%
**Bowie Kuhn**	10	83.33%
**Walter O'Malley**	9	75%
Ewing Kauffman	5	41.67%
John Fetzer	4	33.33%
Bob Howsam	3	25%
Marvin Miller	3	25%
Buzzie Bavasi	<3	
John McHale	<3	
Gabe Paul	<3	

Dreyfuss, who owned the Pittsburgh Pirates from 1900 to 1932, and O'Malley, who owned the Brooklyn/Los Angeles Dodgers from 1950 to 1979, were the first National League owners since the 1980s to be elected to the Hall; Kuhn — who died in March 2007 after receiving just 17% of the vote in the January 2007 vote — had been the only eligible commissioner who served more than five years who had not yet been elected. As with the other committee, voters apparently tried to vote for as many candidates as they were allowed, casting at least 44 of a possible 48 individual votes (vote totals for three candidates were not released). Five of the 10 candidates (Bavasi, Kuhn, Miller, O'Malley and Paul) were holdovers from the 2007 composite ballot, with McHale (who was then a member of the voting committee) being the only one who was not on the initial 2007 list of 60 candidates. The four candidates then living (Bavasi, Howsam, McHale and Miller) were all age 86 or older; Bavasi, Howsam and McHale all died within five months of the election. Miller's 51 votes on the 2007 ballot were second overall to Harvey and tops among executives, and made him the only executive to earn majority support that year.

The election committee, which was announced on the same day as the ballot, included:

- Hall of Famers: Monte Irvin, Harmon Killebrew
- Executives:
  - Retired: Bobby Brown, John Harrington
  - Active: Jerry Bell, Bill DeWitt, Bill Giles, David Glass, Andy MacPhail
- Media: Paul Hagen, Rick Hummel, Hal McCoy

After the elections, various observers expressed skepticism over the failure to elect Marvin Miller, especially given the selection of Kuhn, his longtime bargaining adversary. It was noted that Miller had received 51 votes (out of 81) in the January 2007 election to Kuhn's 14, when all but one of the 84 eligible voters were former players, managers or members of the media; only two had been former executives, including one (McHale) who had previously played in the major leagues, and one former general manager (Lee MacPhail, father of 2008 committee member Andy). Miller had also outpolled Kuhn in the 2003 election by a 35-20 margin. In contrast, half of the 2008 committee was made up of six executives who had never been players, serving almost exclusively as team chairmen or CEOs (Andy MacPhail was the sole general manager), and this panel instead favored Kuhn by a 10-3 margin. Miller himself noted that he was unsurprised by the outcome, given the makeup of the revised committee, saying, "This was done with precision. If you have a set goal in mind, and I think they did, it's not very hard. I'm so able to count votes in advance. Nothing has dimmed with age. No matter how various people involved in the Hall try to put a different gloss on it, it was done primarily to have somebody elected and secondarily to have particular people elected. I don't think this election was about me." He added, "I think it was rigged, but not to keep me out. It was rigged to bring some of these [people] in. It's not a pretty picture. It's demeaning, the whole thing, and I don't mean just to me. It's demeaning to the Hall and demeaning to the people in it."

At the induction ceremonies, Andrew Dreyfuss gave the speech to accept the induction of his great-grandfather Barney, former Dodgers owner Peter O'Malley accepted his father Walter's induction, and Paul Degener accepted the induction of his adoptive stepfather Bowie Kuhn.

== J. G. Taylor Spink Award ==
Larry Whiteside received the J. G. Taylor Spink Award honoring a baseball writer. (The award was voted at the December 2007 meeting of the BBWAA but dated 2008 in a break from previous practice that gives a misleading appearance of skipping one year.)

The Spink Award has been presented by the BBWAA at the annual summer induction ceremonies since 1962. It recognizes a sportswriter "for meritorious contributions to baseball writing". The recipients are not members of the Hall of the Fame, merely featured in a permanent exhibit at the National Baseball Museum, but writers and broadcasters commonly call them "Hall of Fame writers" or words to that effect.

Three final candidates, selected by a BBWAA committee, were named on July 10, 2007, in San Francisco in conjunction with All-Star Game activities: Nick Peters of The Sacramento Bee, Dave Van Dyck of the Chicago Tribune, and Larry Whiteside (1937–2007) of The Boston Globe. All 10-year members of the BBWAA were eligible to cast ballots in voting conducted by mail in November.

On December 5 at baseball's winter meetings, Larry Whiteside was announced as the recipient, having received 203 votes out of the 411 ballots cast, with Peters receiving 119 votes and Van Dyck receiving 89. His son Tony gave the acceptance speech on his behalf.

== Ford C. Frick Award ==
Dave Niehaus received the Ford C. Frick Award honoring a baseball broadcaster.

The Frick Award has been presented at the annual summer induction ceremonies since 1978. It recognizes a broadcaster for "major contributions to baseball". The recipients are not members of the Hall of the Fame, merely featured in a permanent exhibit at the National Baseball Museum, but writers and broadcasters commonly call them "Hall of Fame broadcaster" or words to that effect.

To be eligible, an active or retired broadcaster must have a minimum of 10 years of continuous major league broadcast service with a ball club, a network, or a combination of the two.

Ten finalists were announced on December 4, 2007. In accordance with guidelines established in 2003, seven were chosen by a 20-member committee composed of the 14 living recipients, along with 6 additional broadcasting historians and columnists: Bob Costas (NBC), Barry Horn (The Dallas Morning News), Stan Isaacs (formerly of New York Newsday), Ted Patterson (historian), Curt Smith (historian) and Larry Stewart (Los Angeles Times). The seven finalists chosen by the committee were: Tom Cheek, Ken Coleman, Dizzy Dean, Tony Kubek, Graham McNamee, Dave Niehaus and Dave Van Horne. Three additional candidates – Joe Nuxhall, Bill King and Joe Morgan – were selected from a list of 201 candidates through results of voting by fans conducted throughout November at the Hall's official website.

On February 19 it was announced that Dave Niehaus, play-by-play announcer for the Seattle Mariners since the team began play in 1977, would be the 2008 recipient. His signature "My, oh my!" and "Get out the rye bread and mustard Grandma, cause it's grand salami time!" had been the siren call of summer for Seattle fans for 31 years; at the time he was announced as the recipient, he had called 4,817 of their 4,899 games, and was also a 2000 inductee into the Mariners' Hall of Fame. He was selected in a January vote by the same committee which selected the finalists. They voted by mail, and based the selection on the following criteria: longevity; continuity with a club; honors, including national assignments such as the World Series and All-Star Games; and popularity with fans.

== Buck O'Neil Lifetime Achievement Award ==
The Buck O'Neil Lifetime Achievement Award, which "honors an individual whose extraordinary efforts to enhance baseball's positive impact on society has broadened the game's appeal, and whose character, integrity and dignity reflect the qualities embodied by Buck O'Neil throughout his life and career", was established by the Hall in October 2007 in memory of O'Neil (1911–2006), a former Negro league player and manager, major league coach and scout, and longtime ambassador for the sport. O'Neil was named the first recipient of the honor, which will be bestowed by the Hall's board of directors at a minimum interval of three years. At the 2008 induction ceremonies, Hall of Famer Joe Morgan gave the speech to dedicate and accept the award; a statue of O'Neil, just inside the Hall's entrance, had been unveiled two days earlier.
