= 2010 Baseball Hall of Fame balloting =

Elections to the Baseball Hall of Fame

National Baseball

Hall of Fame and Museum
- New inductees: 3
- via BBWAA: 1
- via Veterans Committee: 2
- Total inductees: 292
- Induction date: July 25, 2010

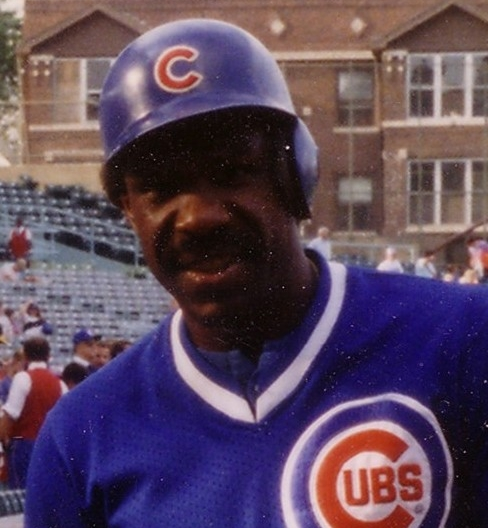
2010 BBWAA inductee Andre Dawson

Elections to the Baseball Hall of Fame for 2010 proceeded according to rules enacted in 2001 and revised in 2007. As always, the Baseball Writers' Association of America (BBWAA) voted by mail to select from a ballot of recent players; one player was elected, Andre Dawson.

In keeping with the 2007 reform, one Veterans Committee convened to consider a ballot of managers and umpires, another to consider a ballot of executives. One manager and one umpire were elected: Whitey Herzog and Doug Harvey, respectively.

An induction ceremony was held in Cooperstown, New York, on July 25, 2010.

A Veterans Committee election to select from older players had been held in the 2009 cycle. The next election for players whose careers began in 1943 or later was scheduled for the 2011 class of inductees while the next for pre-1943 players was scheduled for the 2014 class. However, a reform of the Veterans Committee(s) was announced in July 2010. Per the announcement, long-retired players and all non-playing personnel would be considered on a single ballot, with the ballot restricted by the "Era" in which candidates made their greatest contributions. The next Veterans Committee elections, held in December 2010 as part of the 2011 induction cycle, considered only figures from what the Hall deemed the "Expansion Era", 1973 and later. Candidates from the "Golden Era" (1947–1972) were considered in the balloting for 2012, and candidates from the "Pre-Integration Era" (1871–1946) were considered in the balloting for 2013. These committee meetings were planned to be held in rotation thereafter, one each balloting.

== BBWAA election ==
The BBWAA was again authorized to elect players active in 1990 or later, but not after 2004; the ballot included candidates from the 2009 ballot who received at least 5% of the vote but were not elected, along with selected players, chosen by a screening committee, whose last appearance was in 2004. All 10-year members of the BBWAA were eligible to vote.

Results of the 2010 election by the BBWAA were announced on January 6. The ballot consisted of 26 players, including 11 candidates returning from the 2009 ballot (a record low, displacing the previous year's record of 13).

539 ballots were cast (including five ballots which supported no candidates), with 405 votes required for election. A total of 3,057 individual votes were cast, an average of 5.67 per ballot. Those candidates who received less than 5% of the vote will not appear on future BBWAA ballots, but may eventually be considered by the Veterans Committee.

Candidates who were eligible for the first time are indicated with a dagger (†). The candidate who received at least 75% of the vote and was elected is indicated in bold italics; candidates who have since been selected in subsequent elections are indicated in italics. The candidates who received less than 5% of the vote, thus becoming ineligible for future BBWAA consideration, are indicated with an asterisk (*).

Player	Votes	Percent	Change	Year
**Andre Dawson**	**420**	**77.9%**	**▲10.9%**	**9th**
Bert Blyleven	400	74.2%	▲11.5%	13th
Roberto Alomar†	397	73.7%	–	1st
Jack Morris	282	52.3%	▲8.3%	11th
Barry Larkin†	278	51.6%	–	1st
Lee Smith	255	47.3%	▲2.8%	8th
Edgar Martínez†	195	36.2%	–	1st
Tim Raines	164	30.4%	▲7.8%	3rd
Mark McGwire	128	23.7%	▲1.8%	4th
Alan Trammell	121	22.4%	▲5.0%	9th
Fred McGriff†	116	21.5%	–	1st
Don Mattingly	87	16.1%	▲4.2%	10th
Dave Parker	82	15.2%	▲0.2%	14th
Dale Murphy	63	11.7%	▲0.2%	12th
Harold Baines	33	6.1%	▲0.2%	4th
Andrés Galarraga†*	22	4.1%	–	1st
Robin Ventura†*	7	1.3%	–	1st
Ellis Burks†*	2	0.4%	–	1st
Eric Karros†*	2	0.4%	–	1st
Kevin Appier†*	1	0.2%	–	1st
Pat Hentgen†*	1	0.2%	–	1st
David Segui†*	1	0.2%	–	1st
Mike Jackson†*	0	0.0%	–	1st
Ray Lankford†*	0	0.0%	–	1st
Shane Reynolds†*	0	0.0%	–	1st
Todd Zeile†*	0	0.0%	–	1st

Key
	Elected to the Hall of Fame on this ballot (named in **bold italics**).
	Elected subsequently, as of 2026 (named in plain italics).
	Renominated for the 2011 BBWAA election by adequate performance on this ballot and has not been elected, as of 2026.
	Eliminated from annual BBWAA consideration by poor performance or expiration on this ballot and has not been elected, as of 2026.
†	First time on the BBWAA ballot.
*	Eliminated from annual BBWAA consideration by poor performance or expiration on this ballot.

The newly eligible candidates included 11 All-Stars, who were selected a combined total of 51 times – a notable decrease from 2009, when 22 All-Stars became eligible. Among the first-ballot candidates were 12-time All-Stars Roberto Alomar and Barry Larkin, 7-time All-Star Edgar Martínez, and 5-time All-Stars Andrés Galarraga and Fred McGriff. With respect to major end-of-season awards, the new field contained one Cy Young Award winner (Pat Hentgen), one MVP (Larkin) and one Rookie of the Year (Eric Karros). Alomar won ten Gold Gloves at second base (the most for any second baseman). Robin Ventura received six at third base. Larkin holds the record for most Silver Slugger Awards by a shortstop (nine). Edgar Martínez is tied for the record for most Outstanding Designated Hitter Awards (with David Ortiz) at five (the award has since been renamed the Edgar Martínez Award).

Players who were eligible for the first time who were not included on the ballot were: Paul Abbott, Andy Ashby, Danny Bautista, Darren Bragg, Brian Boehringer, Dave Burba, Greg Colbrunn, Mike Fetters, Brook Fordyce, Karim García, Tom Goodwin, Ricky Gutiérrez, Jimmy Haynes, Sterling Hitchcock, Curt Leskanic, Josías Manzanillo, Brent Mayne, Mark McLemore, Scott Service, Chris Stynes, Scott Sullivan, Todd Van Poppel, John Vander Wal, Fernando Viña, and Turk Wendell.

For the first time in the history of BBWAA voting, two players fell shy of election by fewer than 10 votes. Blyleven, on the ballot for the 13th time, fell 5 votes shy; he gained 62 votes from his 2009 total. Alomar fell 8 votes short in his first appearance on the ballot, and received the highest percentage ever for a first-time candidate who was not elected at that time. Both would be elected in 2011.

== Veterans Committee elections ==
The Veterans Committee election process was revised in July 2007. With the 2007 rules changes, the composite ballot was split into two separate ballots—one for managers and umpires and the other for executives. Also, the voting membership of the Committee, which previously included all living members of the Hall, was reduced to include just a handful of those members, plus additional executives and sportswriters. Voting for both the managers/umpires and executives ballots, which now takes place prior to inductions in even-numbered years, began with the 2008 class of inductees, when two managers and three executives were elected. To be eligible, managers and umpires must be retired for at least five years, or for at least six months if they are age 65 or older, while executives must be either retired or at least age 65.

A Historical Overview Committee of sportswriters appointed by the BBWAA's Board of Directors met to develop a ballot of 10 managers and umpires. The managers/umpires list was then submitted to a panel composed of Hall of Fame members, executives and veteran media members for a final vote. A separate ballot of 10 executives was developed by a panel including executives, players and writers, which was the same committee which finally voted in that area. The final ballots were released in November 2009. Each panel member was allowed to vote for up to four individuals on each ballot, and each candidate who received 75% of the vote from either panel was elected; therefore, a maximum of five inductions were possible from each ballot. Voting was conducted at baseball's winter meetings in Indianapolis on December 6, 2009, with the results announced the next day; as was the case with the 2008 class of inductees, the Committee met to discuss the candidates, although the previous three elections had been conducted by mail.

=== Managers/umpires ballot ===
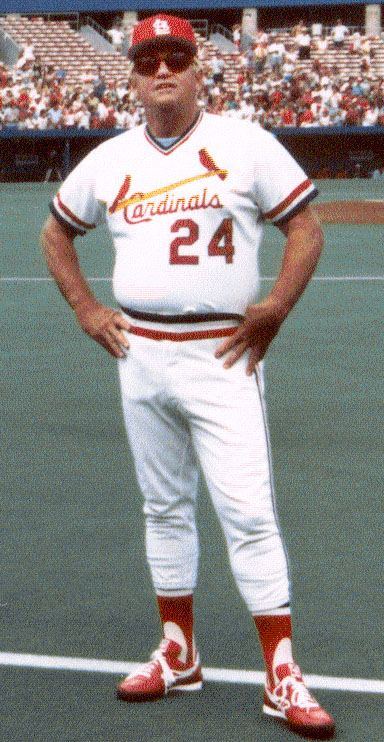
2010 Veterans Committee inductee Whitey Herzog. Doug Harvey was also inducted.

The ballot for managers and umpires included eight managers (designated M) and two umpires (designated U), with 12 votes required for election. Candidates who received at least 75% of the vote were elected. Those that were inducted are indicated in bold italics.

Player	Category	Votes	Percent
**Doug Harvey**	Umpire	15	93.75%
**Whitey Herzog**	Manager	14	87.5%
Danny Murtaugh	Manager	8	50%
Hank O'Day	Umpire	8	50%
Charlie Grimm	Manager	3	18.75%
Davey Johnson	Manager	<3	
Tom Kelly	Manager	<3	
Billy Martin	Manager	<3	
Gene Mauch	Manager	<3	
Steve O'Neill	Manager	<3	

In contrast with the 2008 election, voters made less of an effort to vote for as many candidates as they were allowed. While at least 58 of the permitted 64 individual votes were cast in 2008, the number of known individual votes cast in this election was 48 of the possible 64. (Vote totals for the five trailing candidates were announced as "less than 3", or 0 to 2.) Seven of the candidates had been on the preceding ballot in 2008, with Grimm, Kelly, and O'Neill appearing for the first time and umpire Cy Rigler dropping off the ballot. Four candidates were living when the final results were announced—Harvey (age 79), Herzog (78), Johnson (66), and Kelly (59).

The election committee, which was announced on the same day as the ballot, included:

- Hall of Famers: Jim Bunning, Tommy Lasorda, Eddie Murray, Phil Niekro, Tony Pérez, Robin Roberts, Ryne Sandberg, Ozzie Smith, Billy Williams, Dick Williams
- Executives: Jim Frey, Roland Hemond, Bob Watson
- Media: Tim Kurkjian, Jack O'Connell, Tom Verducci

Of the 16 members of the election committee, 11 voted for the class of 2008. The five new voters were all Hall of Famers—Murray, Roberts, Sandberg, Smith, and 2008 inductee Dick Williams. Because of the changes announced for future elections, this was the last meeting of this particular committee.

Of the ten candidates for election, Doug Harvey and Whitey Herzog received the 75% needed to garner induction.

=== Executives ballot ===
On the executives ballot, 9 votes were required for election; no candidates were elected.

Name	Votes	Percent
John Fetzer	8	66.67%
Marvin Miller	7	58.33%
Jacob Ruppert	7	58.33%
Ewing Kauffman	6	50%
Gene Autry	<3	
Sam Breadon	<3	
Bob Howsam	<3	
John McHale	<3	
Gabe Paul	<3	
Bill White	<3	

As with the other committee, voters in this election made less of an effort to vote for as many candidates as allowed than in the 2008 election. The number of individual votes cast went down to a greater degree than in the managers/umpires balloting—only 28 of the possible 48 individual votes were known to have been cast in this election, compared to 44 in the 2008 voting. (Vote totals for the six trailing candidates were announced as "less than 3", or 0 to 2.)

Of the 10 candidates, six (Fetzer, Howsam, Kauffman, McHale, Miller, and Paul) were holdovers from the 2008 ballot. Autry, Breadon, and Ruppert appeared on the ballot for the first time; White, who was on the 2007 composite ballot but was not on the 2008 ballot, returned for 2010. Buzzie Bavasi, who died in the intervening period, was on the 2008 ballot but not the 2010 ballot. Two candidates were living when the results were announced—Miller, age 92, and White, age 75.

The election committee, which was announced on the same day as the ballot, included:

- Hall of Famers: Robin Roberts, Tom Seaver
- Executives:
  - Retired: John Harrington
  - Active: Jerry Bell, Bill DeWitt, Bill Giles, David Glass, Andy MacPhail, John Schuerholz
- Media: Rick Hummel, Hal McCoy, Phil Pepe

Of the 12 members of the election committee, eight voted for the class of 2008. The new voters were Hall of Famers Roberts and Seaver, executive Schuerholz, and sportswriter Pepe. As with the managers/umpires voting committee, this was the final meeting for the executives voting committee because of the voting changes announced in July 2010.

== J. G. Taylor Spink Award ==
The J. G. Taylor Spink Award has been presented by the BBWAA at the annual summer induction ceremonies since 1962. It recognizes a sportswriter "for meritorious contributions to baseball writing". The recipients are not members of the Hall of the Fame, but instead are featured in a permanent exhibit at the National Baseball Museum.

Three final candidates, selected by a three-member BBWAA committee, were named on July 14, 2009 at Busch Stadium in St. Louis in conjunction with All-Star Game activities: Bill Madden, national baseball columnist for the New York Daily News, Bob Elliott of the Toronto Sun and Joe Giuliotti, retired from the Boston Herald. All 10-year members of the BBWAA were eligible to cast ballots in voting conducted by mail in November.

On December 8 at baseball's winter meetings, Bill Madden was announced as the recipient. Madden, who started his career in 1969 with United Press International before joining the Daily News in 1978, received 226 votes out of the 452 ballots cast, with Elliott receiving 149 votes and Giuliotti receiving 76; one blank ballot was submitted.

== Ford C. Frick Award ==
The Ford C. Frick Award has been presented at the induction ceremonies annually since 1978 to a broadcaster. Recipients are not considered to be members of the Hall, but are permanently recognized in an exhibit at the museum. After the 2007 changes to the Veterans Committee, the winner (if living) is no longer an automatic member of that body. To be eligible, an active or retired broadcaster must have a minimum of 10 years of continuous major league broadcast service with a ball club, a network, or a combination of the two.

Ten finalists were announced in January 2010. In accordance with guidelines established in 2003, seven were chosen by a committee composed of the living recipients, along with additional broadcasting historians and columnists. Three additional candidates were selected from a list of candidates through results of voting by fans conducted in December 2009 on the Hall's Facebook page. The recipient was announced in February following a vote by the same committee which selected the first group of finalists. They based the selection on the following criteria: longevity; continuity with a club; honors, including national assignments such as the World Series and All-Star Games; and popularity with fans.

Jon Miller, radio announcer for the San Francisco Giants, television play-by-play announcer for ESPN Sunday Night Baseball and regular-season and postseason announcer on ESPN Radio, was announced as the 2010 Ford C. Frick Award winner on February 2, 2010. Beginning his career in 1974 with the Oakland Athletics, he is best known for his radio work with the Baltimore Orioles from 1983 through 1996, and the Giants from 1997 to the present. Before joining ESPN in 1990, he worked with NBC from 1986 through 1989. He also worked with The Baseball Network.
