= 2003 Baseball Hall of Fame balloting =

Elections to the Baseball Hall of Fame

National Baseball

Hall of Fame and Museum
- New inductees: 2
- via BBWAA: 2
- Total inductees: 256
- Induction date: July 27, 2003

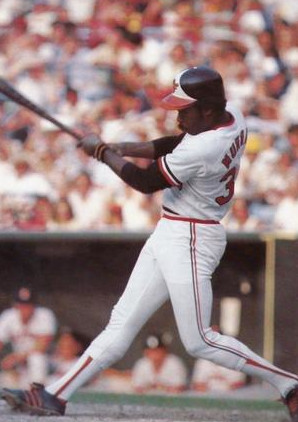
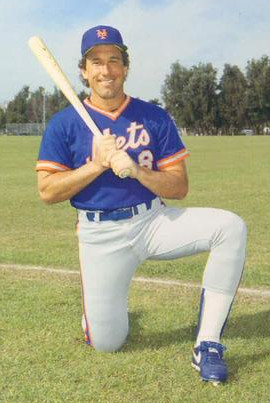
2003 inductees Eddie Murray (left) and Gary Carter

Elections to the Baseball Hall of Fame for 2003 proceeded in keeping with rules enacted in 2001. The Baseball Writers' Association of America (BBWAA) held an election to select from among recent players; Gary Carter and Eddie Murray were elected. The Veterans Committee held elections both for players who were active no later than 1981 and for non-players (managers, umpires and executives), but did not select anyone.

The induction ceremonies were held on July 27 in Cooperstown, with Commissioner Bud Selig presiding.

== BBWAA election ==
The BBWAA was again authorized to elect players active in 1983 or later, but not after 1997; the ballot included candidates from the 2002 ballot who received at least 5% of the vote but were not elected, along with selected players, chosen by a screening committee, whose last appearance was in 1997. In addition, Darryl Kile was exempted from the five-season rule and included on the ballot, due to his unexpected death during the 2002 season. All 10-year members of the BBWAA were eligible to vote.

Voters were instructed to cast votes for up to 10 candidates; any candidate receiving votes on at least 75% of the ballots would be honored with induction to the Hall. Results of the 2003 election by the BBWAA were announced on January 7. The ballot consisted of 33 players; 496 ballots were cast, with 372 votes required for election. A total of 3272 individual votes were cast, an average of 6.60 per ballot. Those candidates receiving less than 5% of the vote (25 votes) will not appear on future BBWAA ballots, but may eventually be considered by the Veterans Committee.

Candidates who were eligible for the first time are indicated here with a dagger (†). The two candidates who received at least 75% of the vote and were elected are indicated in bold italics; candidates who have since been selected in subsequent elections are indicated in italics. The 13 candidates who received less than 5% of the vote, thus becoming ineligible for future BBWAA consideration, are indicated with an asterisk (*).

Jim Kaat was on the ballot for the 15th and final time.

| Player | Votes | Percent | Change | Year |
|---|---|---|---|---|
| **Eddie Murray**† | **423** | **85.3** | - | 1st |
| **Gary Carter** | **387** | **78.0** | ▲5.3% | 6th |
| Bruce Sutter | 266 | 53.6 | ▲3.2% | 10th |
| Jim Rice | 259 | 52.2 | ▼2.9% | 9th |
| Andre Dawson | 248 | 50.0 | ▲4.7% | 2nd |
| Ryne Sandberg† | 244 | 49.2 | - | 1st |
| Lee Smith† | 210 | 42.3 | - | 1st |
| Goose Gossage | 209 | 42.1 | ▼0.9% | 4th |
| Bert Blyleven | 145 | 29.2 | ▲2.9% | 6th |
| Steve Garvey | 138 | 27.8 | ▼0.6% | 11th |
| Jim Kaat | 130 | 26.2 | ▲3.1% | 15th |
| Tommy John | 116 | 23.4 | ▼3.5% | 9th |
| Jack Morris | 113 | 22.8 | ▲2.2% | 4th |
| Alan Trammell | 70 | 14.1 | ▼1.6% | 2nd |
| Don Mattingly | 68 | 13.7 | ▼6.6% | 3rd |
| Dale Murphy | 58 | 11.7 | ▼3.1% | 5th |
| Dave Concepción | 55 | 11.1 | ▼0.8% | 10th |
| Dave Parker | 51 | 10.3 | ▼3.7% | 7th |
| Fernando Valenzuela† | 31 | 6.3 | - | 1st |
| Keith Hernandez | 30 | 6.0 | ▼0.1% | 8th |
| Darryl Kile†* | 7 | 1.4 | - | 1st |
| Vince Coleman†* | 3 | 0.6 | - | 1st |
| Brett Butler†* | 2 | 0.4 | - | 1st |
| Sid Fernandez†* | 2 | 0.4 | - | 1st |
| Rick Honeycutt†* | 2 | 0.4 | - | 1st |
| Tony Peña†* | 2 | 0.4 | - | 1st |
| Darren Daulton†* | 1 | 0.2 | - | 1st |
| Mark Davis†* | 1 | 0.2 | - | 1st |
| Danny Tartabull†* | 1 | 0.2 | - | 1st |
| Danny Jackson†* | 0 | 0.0 | - | 1st |
| Mickey Tettleton†* | 0 | 0.0 | - | 1st |
| Mitch Williams†* | 0 | 0.0 | - | 1st |
| Todd Worrell†* | 0 | 0.0 | - | 1st |

Key
| | Elected to the Hall of Fame on this ballot (named in **bold italics**). |
| | Elected subsequently, as of 2026 (named in plain italics). |
| | Renominated for the 2004 BBWAA election by adequate performance on this ballot and has not been elected, as of 2026. |
| | Eliminated from annual BBWAA consideration by poor performance or expiration on this ballot and has not been elected, as of 2026. |
| † | First time on the BBWAA ballot. |
| * | Eliminated from annual BBWAA consideration by poor performance or expiration on this ballot. |

The newly eligible candidates included 22 All-Stars, five of whom were not on the ballot, who were selected a total of 68 times. Ryne Sandberg was selected a total of ten times, while Eddie Murray (eight times), Lee Smith (seven), Fernando Valenzuela (six) and Tony Peña (five) were all selected at least five times. The field included four Rookies of the Year (Murray, Valenzuela, Vince Coleman and Todd Worrell), as well as one MVP (Sandberg) and two Cy Young Award winners (Valenzuela and Mark Davis). Fernando Valenzuela is the only player ever so far to win a Cy Young Award and a Rookie of the Year Award in the same season.

Players eligible for the first time who were not included on the ballot were: Damon Berryhill, Mike Bielecki, Darnell Coles, Mariano Duncan, Álvaro Espinoza, Greg Gagne, Mike Gallego, Rene Gonzales, Kevin Gross, Mark Gubicza, Ron Karkovice, Joe Orsulak, Jody Reed, Bruce Ruffin, Kevin Seitzer, Don Slaught, and John Smiley.

== Veterans Committee ==
Rules enacted in August 2001 provided that the Veterans Committee would be expanded from its previous 15 members, elected to limited terms, and it would vote by mail rather than convene. The new committee would comprise all living members of the Hall of Fame, recipients of the Spink Award (writers), recipients of the Frick Award (broadcasters), and members of the old committee until expiration of their terms. They would vote by mail using "ballots and supporting material -- prepared by the Hall of Fame".

The process would cover players every two years and other contributors (managers, umpires and executives) every four years. Both cycles first concluded with elections in February 2003, electing no one. (In the event, the system was reformed again after the third fruitless election for players and the second for other contributors in February 2007.)

=== Nomination ===
A new Historical Overview Committee comprising ten baseball writers nominated 200 players and 60 managers, umpires, and executives.

Players. († marks those newly eligible since 2001 (eight). The last played in the majors during 1980 or 1981.)

Babe Adams – Joe Adcock – Dick Allen – Johnny Allen – Felipe Alou – Bobby Ávila – †Sal Bando – Dick Bartell – Ginger Beaumont – Glenn Beckert – Wally Berger – †Bobby Bonds – Ken Boyer – Harry Brecheen – Tommy Bridges – Pete Browning – Charlie Buffinton – Lew Burdette – George H. Burns – George J. Burns – Guy Bush – Dolph Camilli – Leo Cárdenas – Bob Caruthers – George Case – Norm Cash – Phil Cavarretta – Spud Chandler – Ben Chapman – Rocky Colavito – Walker Cooper – Wilbur Cooper – Mort Cooper – Doc Cramer – Del Crandall – Gavy Cravath – Lave Cross – Mike Cuellar – Bill Dahlen – Alvin Dark – Jake Daubert – Tommy Davis – Willie Davis – Paul Derringer – Dom DiMaggio – Patsy Donovan – Jimmie Dykes – Bob Elliott – Del Ennis – Carl Erskine – Roy Face – Wes Ferrell – Freddie Fitzsimmons – Curt Flood – Bill Freehan – Jim Fregosi – Larry French – Carl Furillo – Mike Garcia – Jim Gilliam – Jack Glasscock – Joe Gordon – Charlie Grimm – Dick Groat – Heinie Groh – Stan Hack – Harvey Haddix – Mel Harder – Jeff Heath – Tommy Henrich – Babe Herman – Pinky Higgins – †John Hiller – Gil Hodges – Ken Holtzman – †Willie Horton – Elston Howard – Frank Howard – Dummy Hoy – Larry Jackson – Julián Javier – Jackie Jensen – Sam Jethroe – Bob Johnson – Davey Johnson – Joe Judge – Willie Kamm – Ken Keltner – Don Kessinger – Johnny Kling – Ted Kluszewski – Ray Kremer – Harvey Kuenn – Joe Kuhel – Vern Law – Sam Leever – Mickey Lolich – Sherm Lollar – Herman Long – Ed Lopat – Dolf Luque – Sal Maglie – Jim Maloney – Firpo Marberry – Marty Marion – Roger Maris – †Mike G. Marshall – Pepper Martin – Carl Mays – †Tim McCarver – Frank McCormick – Lindy McDaniel – Gil McDougald – Sam McDowell – Stuffy McInnis – Denny McLain – Roy McMillan – Dave McNally – Andy Messersmith – Bob Meusel – Irish Meusel – Bing Miller – Stu Miller – Minnie Miñoso – Terry Moore – Tony Mullane – Thurman Munson – Johnny Murphy – Buddy Myer – Art Nehf – Don Newcombe – Bobo Newsom – Lefty O'Doul – Tony Oliva – Claude Osteen – Milt Pappas – Mel Parnell – Camilo Pascual – Ron Perranoski – Jim Perry – Johnny Pesky – Rico Petrocelli – Deacon Phillippe – Billy Pierce – Vada Pinson – Wally Pipp – Johnny Podres – Boog Powell – Jack Quinn – Vic Raschi – Ed Reulbach – Allie Reynolds – †J. R. Richard – Eddie Rommel – Charley Root – Al Rosen – Schoolboy Rowe – Pete Runnels – Jimmy Ryan – Johnny Sain – †Manny Sanguillén – Ron Santo – Hank Sauer – Wally Schang – Hal Schumacher – George Scott – Rip Sewell – Bob Shawkey – Urban Shocker – Roy Sievers – Curt Simmons – Vern Stephens – Riggs Stephenson – Mel Stottlemyre – Harry Stovey – Jesse Tannehill – Tony Taylor – Johnny Temple – Fred Tenney – Bobby Thomson – Mike Tiernan – Joe Torre – Cecil Travis – Hal Trosky – Virgil Trucks – George Van Haltren – Johnny Vander Meer – Bobby Veach – Mickey Vernon – Dixie Walker – Bucky Walters – Lon Warneke – Will White – Cy Williams – Ken R. Williams – Maury Wills – Wilbur Wood – Glenn Wright – Jimmy Wynn – Rudy York

Contributors.

Gene Autry – Buzzie Bavasi – Samuel Breadon – Charles Bronfman – Gussie Busch – George W. Bush – Roger Craig – Harry Dalton – Bill Dinneen – Charles Dressen – Barney Dreyfuss – Chub Feeney – John Fetzer – Charles O. Finley – John Galbreath – Larry Goetz – Calvin Griffith – Fred Haney – Doug Harvey – Garry Herrmann – Whitey Herzog – John Heydler – Ralph Houk – Bob Howsam – Fred Hutchinson – Ewing Kauffman – Bowie Kuhn – Frank Lane – Billy Martin – Gene Mauch – Marvin Miller – Danny Murtaugh – Hank O'Day – Walter O'Malley – Steve O'Neill – Paul Owens – Steve Palermo – Gabe Paul – Joan Payson – Babe Pinelli – Bob Quinn – Alfred Reach – Beans Reardon – Paul Richards – Cy Rigler – Bill Rigney – Ben Shibe – Charles Somers – Billy Southworth – George Stallings – Bill Summers – Cedric Tallis – Chuck Tanner – Birdie Tebbetts – Patsy Tebeau – Chris von der Ahe – Lee Weyer – Bill White – Dick Williams – Phil Wrigley

=== Screening ===
Sixty baseball writers selected from the nominees 25 players and 15 other contributors to appear on the ballots. Meanwhile, six Hall of Fame members independently selected five nominated players, making 25 to 30 players. Evidently the writers passed over one man selected by the Hall of Famers, for there were 26 players on the final ballot.

=== Voting ===
Among 85 eligible voters, 81 cast ballots, so 61 votes were the minimum to elect a candidate. Only three players, led by Gil Hodges (61%), tallied more than fifty percent support. († marks those who were newly eligible since 2001. Italics mark those subsequently elected.)

| Player | Votes | Percent |
|---|---|---|
| Gil Hodges | 50 | 61.7% |
| Tony Oliva | 48 | 59.3% |
| Ron Santo | 46 | 56.8% |
| Joe Torre | 29 | 35.8% |
| Maury Wills | 24 | 29.6% |
| Vada Pinson | 21 | 25.9% |
| Joe Gordon | 19 | 23.5% |
| Roger Maris | 18 | 22.2% |
| Marty Marion | 17 | 21.0% |
| Carl Mays | 16 | 19.8% |
| Minnie Miñoso | 16 | 19.8% |
| Allie Reynolds | 16 | 19.8% |
| Dick Allen | 13 | 16.0% |
| Mickey Lolich | 13 | 16.0% |
| Wes Ferrell | 12 | 14.8% |
| Ken Boyer | 11 | 13.6% |
| Don Newcombe | 11 | 13.6% |
| Curt Flood | 10 | 12.3% |
| Ken Williams | 8 | 9.9% |
| Rocky Colavito | 7 | 8.6% |
| Elston Howard | 6 | 7.4% |
| Bob Meusel | 6 | 7.4% |
| Bobby Bonds† | 5 | 6.2% |
| Ted Kluszewski | 4 | 4.9% |
| Thurman Munson | 4 | 4.9% |
| Mike Marshall† | 3 | 19.8% |

On the composite ballot, all fifteen finalists were active since 1976. The candidates, with the ten executives designated, the four managers designated and the sole umpire designated, and those who have since been selected in subsequent elections, indicated in italics, were: Among 85 eligible voters, 79 cast ballots, so 60 votes were the minimum to elect a candidate. Only umpire Doug Harvey tallied more than fifty percent support. (Italics mark those subsequently elected.)

| Player | Category | Votes | Percent |
|---|---|---|---|
| Doug Harvey | Umpire | 48 | 60.8% |
| Walter O'Malley | Executive | 38 | 48.1% |
| Marvin Miller | Executive | 35 | 44.3% |
| Buzzie Bavasi | Executive | 34 | 43.0% |
| Dick Williams | Manager | 33 | 41.8% |
| Whitey Herzog | Manager | 25 | 31.6% |
| Billy Martin | Manager | 22 | 27.8% |
| Bill White | Executive | 22 | 27.8% |
| Bowie Kuhn | Executive | 20 | 25.3% |
| Gabe Paul | Executive | 13 | 16.5% |
| Gussie Busch | Executive | 11 | 13.9% |
| Paul Richards | Manager | 10 | 12.7% |
| Charles O. Finley | Executive | 9 | 11.4% |
| Phil Wrigley | Executive | 13 | 16.0% |
| Harry Dalton | Executive | 6 | 7.6% |

== J. G. Taylor Spink Award ==
Hal McCoy received the J. G. Taylor Spink Award honoring a baseball writer. (The award was voted at the December 2002 meeting of the BBWAA, dated 2002, and conferred in the summer 2003 ceremonies.)

== Ford C. Frick Award ==
Bob Uecker received the Ford C. Frick Award honoring a baseball broadcaster.
