= Doug Harvey (umpire) =

American baseball umpire (1930–2018)

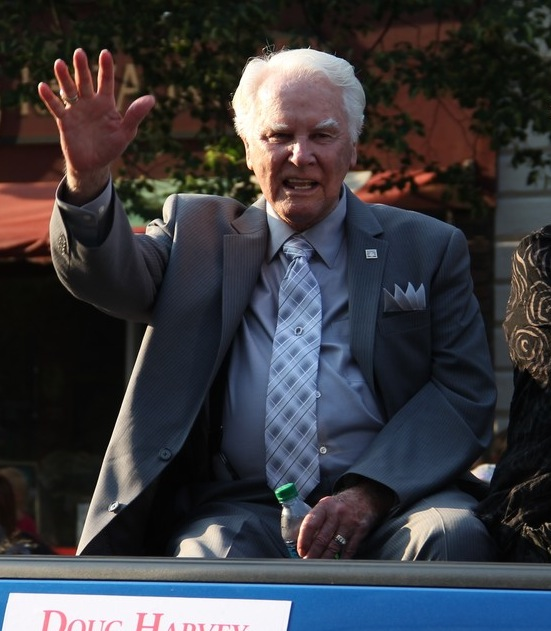
- Harvey at the 2011 Baseball Hall of Fame induction parade
- Born: March 13, 1930; South Gate, California, U.S.
- Died: January 13, 2018 (aged 87); Visalia, California, U.S.
- Education: San Diego State University
- Occupation: Baseball umpire
- Years active: 1962–1992
- Spouses: Joan Manning (m. 1950; div. 1952) Joy Glascock (m. 1960)
- Children: 3
- Baseball career

Member of the National

Baseball Hall of Fame
- Induction: 2010
- Vote: 93.8%
- Election method: Veterans Committee

Harold Douglas Harvey (March 13, 1930 – January 13, 2018), nicknamed "God", was an American umpire in Major League Baseball (MLB), who worked in the National League (NL) from 1962 through 1992.

Known for commanding presence and authoritative signals on the field, he earned his tongue-in-cheek nickname from players, and was the last major league umpire hired who never attended an umpiring school. Harvey umpired five World Series and seven All-Star Games. His career total of 4,673 games ranked third in major league history at the time of his retirement. In 2010, he became the ninth umpire to be inducted into the Baseball Hall of Fame.

In 1999, the Society for American Baseball Research ranked Harvey as the second-greatest umpire in history, behind only Bill Klem. In 2007, Referee magazine selected him as one of the 52 most influential figures in the history of sports officiating. Harvey wore uniform number 8 for most of his career.

== Early life ==
Harvey was born on March 13, 1930, in South Gate, California, but was raised in San Diego, California.

Harvey began officiating local basketball games at the high school level at age 16, later umpiring softball and baseball. He attended San Diego State College in 1955–56, where he played baseball and football. He then returned to umpiring in the minor leagues while also officiating college basketball and football games. He remained a resident of San Diego throughout his umpiring career.

== Career ==
Harvey umpired in the California League from 1958 to 1960, and in the Pacific Coast League in 1961. He married Joy Ann Glascock on September 24, 1960, and the couple had two sons, Scott and Todd. Harvey reached the majors on April 10, 1962, the first regular-season game in Dodger Stadium. His greatest influences were umpires Al Barlick, Jocko Conlan and Shag Crawford, each of whom gave him invaluable advice in developing his skills – Barlick for his renowned mastery of the rules, Conlan for helping him appreciate the fun of umpiring, and Crawford for his tremendous work ethic.

Harvey umpired in five World Series (1968, 1974, 1981, 1984 and 1988), serving as crew chief in 1984 and 1988, and in seven All-Star Games (1963, 1964, 1971, 1977, 1982, 1987, and 1992), calling balls and strikes for the 1982 and 1992 games.

Harvey set a record by officiating in the National League Championship Series nine times – 1970 (Games 2–3), 1972, 1976, 1980, 1983, 1984 (Game 5), 1986, 1989 and 1991 – serving as crew chief for the last five; his record was later tied by Paul Runge in 1997, and broken by Bruce Froemming in 2000.

He was the home plate umpire for the Pirates inaugural game (against the Cincinnati Reds) at Three Rivers Stadium on July 16, 1970. Harvey worked second base in the final game of the 1972 season, in which Roberto Clemente collected his 3,000th (and last) base hit off the New York Mets' Jon Matlack, then retrieved the ball for Clemente. Harvey was the home plate umpire for the single-game playoff to decide the NL's Western Division champion in 1980, between the Houston Astros and the Los Angeles Dodgers. Harvey was the home plate umpire for Game 1 of the 1988 World Series when Kirk Gibson hit a game-winning home run off Dennis Eckersley.

The Players Association conducted polls of players in both leagues to identify and rank the best umpires in 1974; Harvey was named the top NL umpire, being the only official in the league rated as "excellent." In 1987, a Sports Illustrated poll of NL catchers ranked him as the third best umpire in the league for calling balls and strikes, with one voter saying he "still cares about doing the best possible job." In 1990, Sport magazine named him the best umpire in the game, citing his unbending application of the rules and noting his campaign to enforce the balk rule two seasons earlier, when he said, "Give me ten high school pitchers, let me spend a week with them, and I'll show you 10 pitchers who won't balk. It's not that difficult. So they better learn it."

Harvey's goal of umpiring until age 65 ended on October 4, 1992, at age 62, when knee problems necessitated his retirement. He nonetheless became the first NL umpire since Bill Klem to work for more than 30 years, finishing with 31 years in the major leagues; his 4,673 games then ranked third in major league history behind Klem (5,374) and Tommy Connolly (4,769).

Harvey noted that when he arrived in the major leagues, the emphasis was on making calls quickly and decisively, and said, "Everything was called too quickly. I've got a photograph of Jocko Conlan working first base. Jocko's arm was extended in the out call. But the runner was still short of the bag, and the ball was still in flight. In those days it was common to anticipate the call". Harvey, however, changed attitudes by insisting that it was better to delay the call and make sure it was correct.

Harvey was easily recognizable due to his thick white hair, which had already gone completely gray when he was in his 30s, leading to the early nickname of "Silver." In late 1971, he grew a handlebar mustache, at a time when no major league field personnel had worn facial hair since the 1940s; he kept it trimmed to the edges of his mouth, and he wore it during the 1972 season, when Oakland A's players began to grow mustaches that season in order to earn bonuses from owner Charlie O. Finley. In the latter part of his career, Harvey was the voice of MLB's "You Make the Call" segments.

== Later life ==
In August 1997, Harvey was diagnosed with esophageal cancer, which was attributed to his longtime use of chewing tobacco.

In both 2003 and 2007, Harvey was the leading candidate for the Baseball Hall of Fame in voting by Hall members on the Veterans Committee composite ballot for managers, umpires and executives; however, his totals of 48 and 52 votes in the two elections fell short of the 60 and 62 necessary for election. Under new rules established by the Hall in 2007, he was again eligible for election in 2008, but fell one vote short of the required 12 votes. On December 7, 2009, Harvey was elected to the National Baseball Hall of Fame by the Hall of Fame Veterans' Committee and was inducted on July 25, 2010. Due to persistent voice issues from his cancer, Harvey's speech was pre-recorded and delivered on a video broadcast, though he did say a few words after the speech was played to the estimated 10,000 fans in attendance.

Harvey died at the age of 87 on January 13, 2018, under hospice care in Visalia, California.

== See also ==
- List of Major League Baseball umpires (disambiguation)
