= Larry Whiteside =

American sportswriter

- Born: September 19, 1937; Chicago, Illinois, U.S.
- Died: June 15, 2007 (aged 69); Boston, Massachusetts, U.S.
- Education: Drake University (B.A.)
- Occupation: Sportswriter
- Years active: 1959–2004
- Known for: Boston Red Sox coverage
- Spouse: Elaine
- Children: 1
- Awards: J. G. Taylor Spink Award (2008)

Lawrence W. Whiteside (September 19, 1937 – June 15, 2007), nicknamed "Sides", was an American journalist known for his newspaper coverage of baseball, most notably of the Boston Red Sox for The Boston Globe.

== Early life ==
Whiteside was born in Chicago, in 1937. He graduated from Drake University with a Bachelor of Arts degree in 1959. While at Drake, he wrote for The Des Moines Register.

== Career ==
Whiteside became a full-time writer with the Kansas City Kansan in 1959. He moved to Milwaukee, Wisconsin, where he covered the Milwaukee Braves as well as civil rights issues for The Milwaukee Journal. Team owner Bud Selig offered Whiteside a job with the Milwaukee Brewers when the franchise relocated from Seattle in 1970, but he preferred to continue working in journalism.

In 1971, Whiteside started The Black List to help sports editors find qualified black journalists to hire. Initially The Black List only had nine names, but by 1983 it had expanded to more than 90.

=== Boston ===
Whiteside moved to Boston in 1973, where he worked for The Boston Globe through the end of his career. At the time, he was the only black journalist covering Major League Baseball on a daily basis for a major paper.

Whiteside covered many of the most notable events in Boston baseball history, ranging from Bucky Dent's home run to defeat the Boston Red Sox in the 1978 American League East playoff, to the Red Sox losing the 1986 World Series to the New York Mets, to Roger Clemens' second 20-strikeout game.

Whiteside was an expert on Negro league baseball, and was one of the first American journalists to follow baseball in other countries. The National Association of Black Journalists gave Whiteside a lifetime achievement award in 1999. He was part of the panel that chose the Major League Baseball All-Century Team.

Whiteside developed Parkinson's disease early in the 21st century, which led to the end of his reporting career in 2004. In September 2003, the Red Sox had Whiteside throw out a ceremonial first pitch at Fenway Park. Whiteside died in Boston in June 2007, survived by his wife and one son. The day that Whiteside died, the Red Sox observed a moment of silence in his honor prior to their home game against the San Francisco Giants.

=== Legacy ===
In July 2007, Whiteside was selected by a Baseball Writers' Association of America (BBWAA) committee as one of three finalists for the J. G. Taylor Spink Award, and he was announced as the winner on December 5 following a vote by the BBWAA membership; he was honored in July 2008. Whiteside became the first African-American beat writer to receive the Spink Award.
