= Dick Williams =

American baseball player and manager (1929–2011)

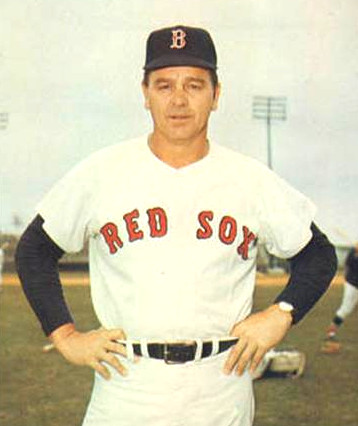
- Williams in 1969
- Outfielder / Third baseman / Manager
- Born: May 7, 1929; St. Louis, Missouri, U.S.
- Died: July 7, 2011 (aged 82); Las Vegas, Nevada, U.S.
- Batted: Right Threw: Right

MLB debut
- June 10, 1951, for the Brooklyn Dodgers

Last MLB appearance
- September 22, 1964, for the Boston Red Sox

MLB statistics
- Batting average: .260
- Home runs: 70
- Runs batted in: 331
- Managerial record: 1,571–1,451–1
- Winning %: .520
- Stats at Baseball Reference
- Managerial record at Baseball Reference

Teams
- As player: Brooklyn Dodgers (1951–1954, 1956); Baltimore Orioles (1956–1957); Cleveland Indians (1957); Baltimore Orioles (1958); Kansas City Athletics (1959–1960); Baltimore Orioles (1961–1962); Boston Red Sox (1963–1964); As manager: Boston Red Sox (1967–1969); Oakland Athletics (1971–1973); California Angels (1974–1976); Montreal Expos (1977–1981); San Diego Padres (1982–1985); Seattle Mariners (1986–1988); As coach: Montreal Expos (1970)

Career highlights and awards
- 2× World Series champion (1972, 1973); Boston Red Sox Hall of Fame; Athletics Hall of Fame; San Diego Padres Hall of Fame

Member of the National

Baseball Hall of Fame
- Induction: 2008
- Vote: 81.3%
- Election method: Veterans Committee

Richard Hirschfeld Williams (May 7, 1929 – July 7, 2011) was an American left fielder, third baseman, manager, coach and front-office consultant in Major League Baseball (MLB). Known especially as a hard-driving, sharp-tongued manager from 1967 to 1969 and from 1971 to 1988, he led teams to three American League pennants, one National League pennant, and two World Series triumphs. He is one of nine managers to win pennants in both major leagues, and joined Bill McKechnie in becoming only the second manager to lead three franchises to the Series (Bruce Bochy, in 2023, became the third). He and Lou Piniella are the only managers in history to lead four teams to seasons of 90 or more wins. Williams was inducted into the National Baseball Hall of Fame in 2008 following his election by the Veterans Committee.

== Early life ==
Williams was born on May 7, 1929, in St. Louis, Missouri, and lived there until age 13, when his family moved to Pasadena, California. He attended Pasadena High School (which was then part of Pasadena Junior College, now Pasadena City College), where he was All-State in baseball and also played football and basketball (1946–47). In 2001, he was inducted into the Pasadena City College Hall of Fame.

== Professional playing career ==
=== Minor leagues ===
Just out of high school, Williams signed his first professional contract with the Brooklyn Dodgers in 1947. From 1947 to 1956, he played all or parts of each season in the Dodgers minor league system. In 1948, playing Class C baseball, he had a .335 batting average with 16 home runs; however, Williams hit only .207 in Double-A baseball that year. A year later, again playing Double-A ball, he hit .310, with 23 home runs, 114 runs batted in (RBI) and 109 runs scored. In partial seasons playing Triple-A baseball he never hit more than .278. In 1955, his final full year in the minor leagues, he played Double-A ball for the Fort Worth Cats of the Texas League, hitting .317, with 24 home runs.

Williams played under manager Bobby Bragan at Fort Worth. Williams said, "'There should be a note under every one of my records that says See Bobby Bragan. Because a bit of every one of my wins belongs to him.'"

=== Major leagues ===
From 1951 to 1954 and 1956, Williams was called up to the Brooklyn Dodgers. He never played in more than 36 games for the Dodgers during any of those seasons, and never had more than 71 plate appearances in a season.

Williams played his first major league game with Brooklyn in 1951. A right-handed batter and thrower, Williams was listed as 6 feet (1.8 m) tall and 190 pounds (86 kg). Initially an outfielder, he separated a shoulder attempting to make a diving catch on August 25, 1952. Williams missed the rest of the season and the injury permanently weakened his throwing arm. As a result, he learned to play several positions (he was frequently a first baseman and third baseman) and became a notorious "bench jockey" in order to keep his major league job. Over his five years in Brooklyn, Williams played in only 112 games with 224 at bats. The Dodgers waived him on June 25, 1956 and he was claimed by the Baltimore Orioles.

He was a favorite of Paul Richards, who acquired Williams four different times between 1956 and 1962 when Richards was a manager or general manager with Baltimore and the Houston Colt .45s. One such transaction occurred on April 12, 1961, when Williams was traded along with Dick Hall from the Athletics to the Orioles for Chuck Essegian and Jerry Walker. He never played for Houston; he was acquired in an off-season "paper transaction" on October 12, 1962, then traded to the Boston Red Sox for another outfielder, Carroll Hardy, on December 10.

Williams played his most games for any one team in his five years as an Oriole (447), hitting 25 home runs and batting .255 in 1,417 at bats. Of greater significance may have been Richards's influence on Williams as a future manager. Like Bragan, with patience and down to the most minute detail, Richards would take days teaching all of his players the most fundamental aspects of the game, and how to handle each situation they might face on offense and defense.

Richards traded Williams to Cleveland during 1957 (where he played sparingly), but traded back for him at the beginning of 1958. Richards then traded him again after the 1958 season to the Kansas City Athletics for Chico Carrasquel. Williams played over 100 games each year in Kansas City (1959–60), and had his best all around hitting year in 1959, batting .266, with career highs of 16 home runs, 75 RBIs, 72 runs scored and 538 plate appearances, playing principally at third base (while also playing first base and the outfield). The following year, he hit .288 with 12 home runs and 65 RBIs. Richards traded for him again in April 1961, Richards last year with the Orioles. He again played over 100 games, but his average fell to .206.

In his final two years playing for the Red Sox, Williams only had a total 229 plate appearances. His two-year playing career in Boston was uneventful, except for one occasion. On June 27, 1963, Williams was victimized by one of the greatest catches in Fenway Park history. His long drive to the opposite field was snagged by Cleveland right fielder Al Luplow, who made a leaping catch at the wall and tumbled into the bullpen with the ball in his grasp.

Williams appeared in 1,023 games over 13 seasons with the Brooklyn Dodgers, Baltimore Orioles, Cleveland Indians, Kansas City Athletics, and Boston Red Sox. He posted a career batting average of .260; his 768 hits included 70 home runs, 157 doubles and 12 triples. In the field, he appeared in 456 games in the outfield, 257 at third base, and 188 at first.

== Managing career ==
=== Boston Red Sox ===
On October 14, 1964, after a season during which Williams hit a career-low .159, the Red Sox handed him his unconditional release. At 35, Williams was at a career crossroads: Richards gave him a spring training invitation but no guarantee that he would make the 1965 Astros' playing roster; the Red Sox offered Williams a job as playing coach with their Triple-A farm team, the Seattle Rainiers of the Pacific Coast League. Looking to begin a post-playing career in baseball, Williams accepted the Seattle assignment.

Within days, a shuffle in 1965 affiliations forced Boston to move its top minor league team to the Toronto Maple Leafs of the International League; as the Rainiers became the Seattle Angels (the Triple-A affiliate of the Los Angeles Angels). This caused the Red Sox' Triple-A manager, Seattle native Edo Vanni, to resign in order to remain in the Pacific Northwest. With a sudden opening for the Toronto job, Williams was promoted to manager of the 1965 Leafs. As a novice pilot, Williams adopted a hard-nosed, disciplinarian style and won two consecutive Governors' Cup championships with teams laden with young Red Sox prospects.

He then signed a one-year contract to manage the 1967 Red Sox, making Williams feel he had a lot to prove. Boston had suffered through eight straight seasons of losing baseball, and attendance had fallen to such an extent that owner Tom Yawkey was threatening to move the team; and threatening to move unless a new stadium was built to replace Fenway Park. The Red Sox had talented young players, but the team was known as a lazy "country club." As Carl Yastrzemski commented, "if you don't keep your nose to the grindstone you won't (win) ... we kept our noses so far away from the grindstone we couldn't even see it."

Williams decided to risk everything and impose discipline on his players. Before the season, Williams said "I honestly believe we'll win more games than we lose"—a bold statement for a club that had finished only a half-game from last place in 1966. The only team with a worse record than the Red Sox was their arch-rival, the New York Yankees, who were headed in a downward spiral only two years after losing the 1964 World Series to the St. Louis Cardinals in seven games.

In spring training, Williams instituted a dress code, vowed to relentlessly drill the players on the fundamentals, and he took the title of captain from team star Carl Yastrzemski. As then rookie Mike Andrews (who had played two years for Williams in Toronto) recalled, when Williams stripped Yastrzemski of this title, he said "'There's only one chief, and that's me. Everybody else is the Indians.'" Williams drilled players in fundamentals for hours. He issued fines for curfew violations, and insisted his players put the success of the team before their own. In Yastrzemski's words, "Dick Williams didn't take anything when he took over the club last spring ... to the best of my knowledge—and I would know if it had happened—no one challenged Williams all season."

The Red Sox began 1967 playing better baseball and employing the aggressive style of play that Williams had learned with the Dodgers. Williams benched players for lack of effort and poor performance, and battled tooth and nail with umpires. Through the All-Star break, Boston fulfilled Williams's promise and played better than .500 ball, hanging close to the American League's four contending teams—the Detroit Tigers, Minnesota Twins, Chicago White Sox and California Angels. Outfielder Carl Yastrzemski, in his seventh season with the Red Sox, transformed his hitting style to become a pull-hitter, eventually winning the 1967 AL Triple Crown, leading the league in batting average, home runs (tying Harmon Killebrew of the Twins with 44), and RBIs.

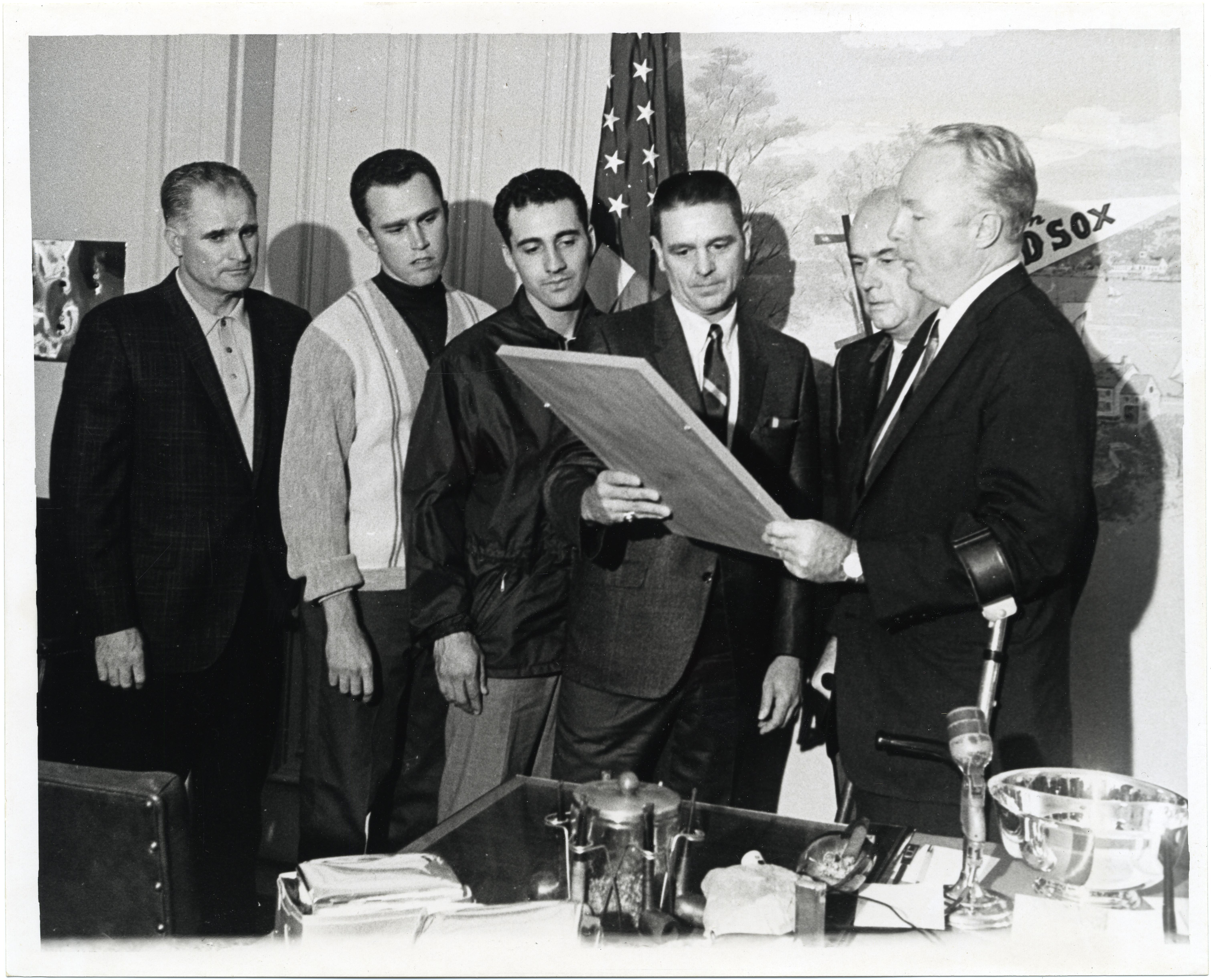
Williams (fourth from left) and other Red Sox personnel with Mayor of Boston John F. Collins (at right) in October 1967

In late July, the Red Sox rattled off a 10-game winning streak on the road and came home to a riotous welcome from 10,000 fans at Boston's Logan Airport. The Red Sox inserted themselves into a five-team pennant race, and stayed in the hunt despite the loss of star outfielder Tony Conigliaro to a beanball on August 18. (Pitcher Jack Hamilton denied intentionally throwing at Conigliaro, and he never hit another batter during his career.)

On the closing weekend of the season, led by Yastrzemski and 22-game-winning pitcher Jim Lonborg, Boston defeated the Twins in two head-to-head games, while Detroit split its series with the Angels. The "Impossible Dream" Red Sox had won their first AL pennant since 1946, then they extended the highly talented and heavily favored St. Louis Cardinals to seven games in the 1967 World Series, losing to the great Bob Gibson three times.

Despite the Series loss, the Red Sox were the toasts of New England; Williams was named Major League Manager of the Year by The Sporting News and signed to a new three-year contract. But he would not serve it out. In 1968, the team fell to fourth place when Conigliaro could not return from his head injury, and Williams's two top pitchers—Lonborg and José Santiago—suffered sore arms. He began to clash with Yastrzemski, and with owner Yawkey. With his club a distant third in the AL East, Williams was fired on September 23, 1969, and replaced by Eddie Popowski for the last nine games of the season.

=== Oakland Athletics ===
1971 postcard of Williams for the Oakland Athletics

After spending 1970 as the third base coach of the Montreal Expos, working under Gene Mauch, Williams returned to the managerial ranks the next year as boss of the Oakland Athletics, owned by Charlie Finley. Finley had signed players such as future Hall of Famer Catfish Hunter, future Hall of Famer Reggie Jackson, Sal Bando, Bert Campaneris, future Hall of Famer Rollie Fingers and Joe Rudi, that were described by Finley as the "Swingin' A's".

During his first decade as the Athletics' owner, 1961–1970, Finley had changed managers a total of ten times. Williams would be Finley's first manager to last two full consecutive years and then three full consecutive years (1971–74). When Finley sold the team in August 1980, only Alvin Dark had managed more A's games under his ownership, and Williams still held the three consecutive year mark since Dark had two different stints under Finley.

Inheriting a second-place team from predecessor John McNamara, Williams promptly directed the A's to 101 victories and their first AL West title in 1971 behind another brilliant young player, pitcher Vida Blue. Despite being humbled in the ALCS by the defending World Champion Orioles 3–0, Finley brought Williams back for 1972, when the "Oakland Dynasty" began; though he would not be there to manage the end of the dynasty in 1974.

Off the field, the A's players brawled with each other and defied baseball's tonsorial code. Because long hair, mustaches and beards were now the rage in the "civilian" world, Finley decided on a mid-season promotion encouraging his men to wear their hair long and grow facial hair. Fingers adopted his trademark handlebar mustache (which he still has to this day); Williams himself grew a mustache.

Of course, talent, not hairstyle, truly defined the Oakland Dynasty of the early 1970s. The 1972 A's won their division by 5½ games over the White Sox and led the league in home runs (134), team shutouts (23) and saves (43). They defeated the Tigers in a bitterly fought ALCS (winning the deciding game 5 2–1), and found themselves facing the Cincinnati Reds in the World Series. With the A's leading power hitter, Jackson, out with an injury, Cincinnati's Big Red Machine was favored to win, but the home run heroics of Oakland catcher Gene Tenace and the managerial maneuvering of Williams resulted in a seven-game World Series victory for the A's, their first championship since 1930, when they played in Philadelphia.

In 1973, with Williams back for an unprecedented (for the Finley era) third straight campaign, the A's again coasted to a division title behind three twenty game winners (Ken Holtzman, Blue and Hunter), then defeated Baltimore in the ALCS and the NL champion New York Mets in the World Series – each hard-fought series going the limit. With their World Series win, Oakland became baseball's first repeat champion since the 1961–62 New York Yankees.

Tired of his owner's meddling, and upset by Finley's public humiliation of second baseman Mike Andrews for his fielding miscues during the World Series, Williams resigned. Williams was the first manager in A's franchise history to leave the team with a winning record after running it for two full seasons.

The Yankees expressed their desire to sign Williams. In October 1973, Finley refused to release Williams from the last year of his contract to sign with the Yankees, unless he was compensated. George Steinbrenner, then finishing his first season as owner of the Yankees, signed Williams as his manager anyway, on December 13, 1973. (It has also been stated that Steinbrenner signed Williams in October.) As the contract needed league approval, American League president Joe Cronin held hearings on the dispute, and ruled in Finley's favor, rejecting Williams contract with the Yankees, on December 20, 1973. Steinbrenner hired Bill Virdon instead.

In June 1976, when Finley tried to sell Blue's rights to Steinbrenner and the Yankees for $1 million (as well as Joe Rudi and Rollie Fingers for the same sum each to the Red Sox), in anticipation of losing them to free agency, baseball commissioner Bowie Kuhn blocked all three deals.

=== California Angels ===
1974 photocard of Williams for California Angels

Seemingly at the peak of his career, Williams began the 1974 season out of baseball. But when the Angels struggled under manager Bobby Winkles, team owner Gene Autry and general manager Harry Dalton asked for and received Finley's permission to negotiate with Williams, and in mid-season Williams was back in a big-league dugout. Future Hall of Fame manager Whitey Herzog replaced Winkles for four games before Williams arrived. The change in management, though, did not alter the fortunes of the Angels, as they finished in last place, 22 games behind the A's, who would win their third straight World Championship under Williams's replacement, Alvin Dark.

Overall, Williams's Anaheim tenure turned out to be a miserable one. He did not have nearly as much talent to work with as he had had in Boston and Oakland, and the Angels did not respond to Williams's somewhat authoritarian managing style. They finished last in the AL West again in 1975. During the 1975 season, Boston Red Sox pitcher Bill Lee stated that the Angels' hitters were "so weak, they could hold batting practice in the Boston Sheraton hotel lobby and not hit the chandelier". Williams responded by having his team actually do so before the game (using Wiffle balls and bats) with the Red Sox until hotel security put a stop to it. The Angels were 18 games below .500 (and in the midst of a player revolt) in 1976 when Williams was fired July 23.

=== Montreal Expos ===
1980 photocard of Williams for Montreal Expos

In 1977, he returned to Montreal as manager of the Expos where he remained for 5 years (Williams's longest stint as manager), who had just come off 107 losses and a last-place finish in the NL East. Team president John McHale had been impressed with Williams's efforts in Boston and Oakland, and thought he was what the Expos needed to finally become a winner.

After cajoling the Expos into improved, but below .500, performances in his first two seasons, Williams turned the 1979–80 Expos into pennant contenders. The team won over 90 games both years—the first winning seasons in franchise history. The 1979 unit won 95 games, the most that the franchise would win in Montreal. However, they finished second each time to the eventual World Champion (the Pittsburgh Pirates in 1979 and the Philadelphia Phillies in 1980). Williams was never afraid to give young players a chance to play, and his Expos teams were flush with young talent, including All-Stars such as future Hall of Famers outfielder Andre Dawson and catcher Gary Carter. With a solid core of young players and a fruitful farm system, the Expos seemed a lock to contend for a long time to come.

But Williams's hard edge alienated his players—especially his pitchers—and ultimately wore out his welcome. He labeled pitcher Steve Rogers a fraud with "king of the mountain syndrome" – meaning that Rogers had been a good pitcher on a bad team for so long that he was unable to "step up" when the team became good. Williams also lost confidence in closer Jeff Reardon, whom the Montreal front office had acquired in a much publicized trade with the Mets for Ellis Valentine; and McHale believed Williams was underutilizing Reardon.

When the 1981 Expos performed below expectations, Williams was fired during the pennant drive on September 8. McHale also believed that Williams had lost control over some of his players on road trips, and also that Williams might jump to the Yankees the next season, and that was part of his decision making in firing Williams (and Steinbrenner did express an interest in Williams after he was fired). With the arrival of his easy-going successor Jim Fanning, who restored Reardon to the closer's role, the inspired Expos made the playoffs for the only time in their 36-year history in Montreal. However, they fell in heartbreaking fashion to the eventual World Champion Los Angeles Dodgers in the deciding fifth game of the NLCS; losing 2–1, when Rick Monday hit a home run off Rogers in the ninth inning with two outs.

Williams had a won–loss record of 380–352 with the Expos, and achieved his 1,000th victory as a major league manager August 5, 1980.

=== San Diego Padres ===
1983 photocard ofWilliams for the San Diego Padres

Williams was not unemployed for long, however. In 1982, he was hired to manage the San Diego Padres. By 1984, he had guided the Padres to their first NL West Division championship. In the NLCS, the NL East champion Chicago Cubs – making their first postseason appearance since 1945 – won Games 1 and 2, but Williams's Padres took the next three games in a miraculous comeback to win the pennant.

In the World Series, however, San Diego was no match for Sparky Anderson's Detroit Tigers, a team that had won 104 games during the regular season. Although the Tigers won the Series in five games, both Williams and Anderson joined Dark, Joe McCarthy, and Yogi Berra as managers who had won pennants in both major leagues (Tony La Russa joined this group in 2004, Jim Leyland followed suit in 2006, followed by Joe Maddon in 2016, Dusty Baker in 2021 and Bruce Bochy—a backup catcher on that Padres team—in 2023.)

The Padres fell to third in 1985, and Williams was let go, or resigned, as manager just before 1986 spring training; after the Padres had rejected Williams request for a contract extension beyond 1986. It is also said the breaking point between Williams and the team's executive was their request that Williams change his hand picked coaching staff. His record with the Padres was 337–311 over four seasons. As of 2025, among Padres managers with two or more years heading the team, he and Bob Melvin are the only managers in the team's history without a losing season. (Going into the 2025 season, Mike Shildt has one winning season with the Padres, 93–69.)

His difficulties with the Padres stemmed from a power struggle with team president Ballard Smith and general manager Jack McKeon. Williams was a hire of team owner (and McDonald's restaurant magnate) Ray Kroc, whose health was failing. McKeon and Smith (who also happened to be Kroc's son-in-law) were posturing to buy the team and viewed Williams as a threat to their plans. With his San Diego tenure at an end, it appeared that Williams's managerial career was finished.

Padres Hall of Famer Tony Gwynn, who played for Williams from 1982 to 1985, stated, "'I owe Dick a lot.... The city and the Padres owe him a lot. I think a lot of fans bought right into it like the players did, like in ’82, when he first took over, then ’84 when we went to the World Series.'"

=== Seattle Mariners ===
1986 Mother's Cookies card of Williams for the Seattle Mariners

When another perennial loser, the Seattle Mariners, lost 19 of their first 28 games in 1986 under Chuck Cottier, Williams came back to the American League West on May 9 for the first time in almost a decade. The Mariners showed some life that season and almost reached .500 the following season. However, Williams's autocratic managing style no longer resonated with the new generation of ballplayers. He tried to play injury-plagued Gorman Thomas in the outfield, but was rebuked by the Mariners' front office because of Thomas's medical history, namely his rotator cuff. Also, Williams had trouble relating to the devoutly religious Mariners' players, namely Alvin Davis. Williams was fired on June 6, 1988, with Seattle at 23–33 (.411) and in sixth place. It was his last major-league managing job.

== Managerial record ==
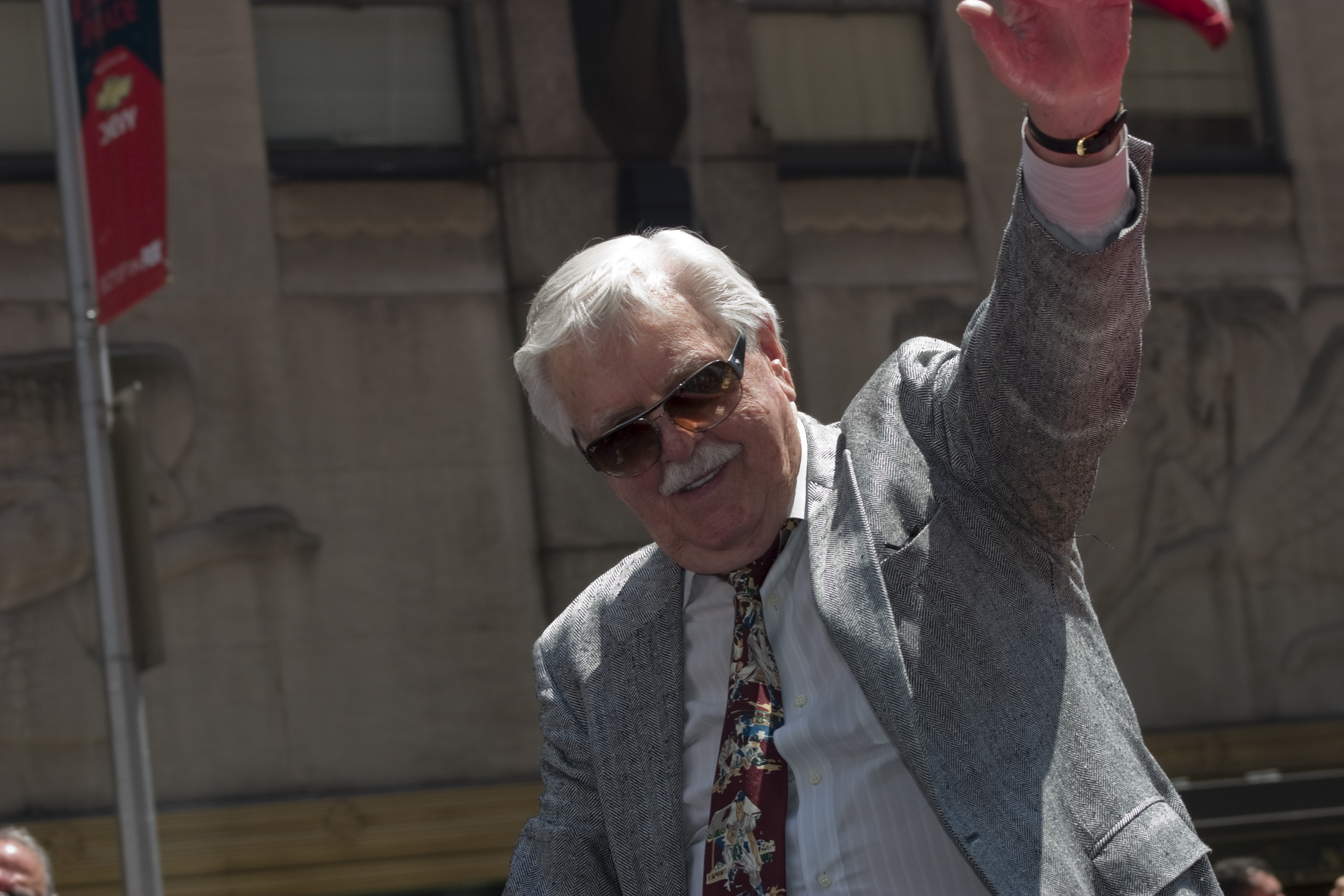
Williams at the 2008 All-Star Game Red Carpet Parade

Team	Year	Regular season					Postseason			
Team	Year	Games	Won	Lost	Win %	Finish	Won	Lost	Win %	Result
BOS	1967	162	92	70	.568	1st in AL	3	4	.429	Lost World Series (STL)
BOS	1968	162	86	76	.531	4th in AL	–	–	–	–
BOS	1969	153	82	71	.536	fired	–	–	–	–
BOS total		477	260	217	.545		3	4	.429	
OAK	1971	161	101	60	.627	1st in AL West	0	3	.000	Lost ALCS (BAL)
OAK	1972	155	93	62	.600	1st in AL West	7	5	.583	Won World Series (CIN)
OAK	1973	162	94	68	.580	1st in AL West	7	5	.583	Won World Series (NYM)
OAK total		478	288	190	.603		14	13	.519	
CAL	1974	84	36	48	.429	6th in AL West	–	–	–	–
CAL	1975	161	72	89	.447	6th in AL West	–	–	–	–
CAL	1976	96	39	57	.406	fired	–	–	–	–
CAL total		341	147	194	.431		0	0	–	
MON	1977	162	75	87	.463	5th in NL East	–	–	–	–
MON	1978	162	76	86	.469	4th in NL East	–	–	–	–
MON	1979	160	95	65	.594	2nd in NL East	–	–	–	–
MON	1980	162	92	70	.568	2nd in NL East	–	–	–	–
MON	1981	55	30	25	.545	3rd in NL East	–	–	–	–
MON	1981	26	14	12	–	fired	–	–	–	–
MON total		727	380	347	.523		0	0	–	
SD	1982	162	81	81	.500	4th in NL West	–	–	–	–
SD	1983	162	81	81	.500	4th in NL West	–	–	–	–
SD	1984	162	92	70	.568	1st in NL West	4	6	.400	Lost World Series (DET)
SD	1985	162	83	79	.512	3rd in NL West	–	–	–	–
SD total		648	337	311	.520		4	6	.400	
SEA	1986	133	58	75	.436	7th in AL West	–	–	–	–
SEA	1987	162	78	84	.481	4th in AL West	–	–	–	–
SEA	1988	56	23	33	.411	fired	–	–	–	–
SEA total		351	159	192	.453		0	0	–	
Total		3022	1571	1451	.520		21	23	.477	

== Post-major league manager ==
In 1989, Williams was named manager of the West Palm Beach Tropics of the Senior Professional Baseball Association, a league featuring mostly former major league players 35 years of age and older. The Tropics went 52–20 in the regular season and ran away with the Southern Division title. Despite their regular season dominance, the Tropics lost 12–4 to the St. Petersburg Pelicans in the league's championship game. The Tropics folded at the end of the season, and the rest of the league folded a year later. He remained in the game, however, as a special consultant to George Steinbrenner and the New York Yankees.

== Legacy and honors ==
Williams was elected to the National Baseball Hall of Fame by the Veterans Committee in December 2007, and was inducted on July 27, 2008. He was inducted into the San Diego Padres Hall of Fame in 2009. In 2024, Williams was posthumously inducted into the Oakland Athletics Hall of Fame.

In 1990, Williams published his autobiography, No More Mister Nice Guy. His acrimonious departure in 1969 distanced Williams from the Red Sox for the remainder of the Yawkey ownership period (through 2001), but after the change in ownership and management that followed, he was selected to the Boston Red Sox Hall of Fame in 2006.

Williams's career win–loss totals were 1,571 wins and 1,451 losses over 21 seasons. He was ejected by umpires 57 times. His teams won three pennants in the American League and one in the National League, and were 2–2 in World Series play. Along with Bruce Bochy and Bill McKechnie, Williams is one of three managers to lead three different teams to the World Series.

Williams's number was retired by the Fort Worth Cats. The Cats were a popular minor league team in Fort Worth and Williams played there during 1948, 1949 and 1950, while he was working his way through the Dodgers' system. Moreover, Williams—in his Hall of Fame speech—cited Bobby Bragan, his Fort Worth manager, as a significant influence on his own career. After the Texas League Cats finally disbanded in 1964, they returned as an independent league team in 2001. These "New" Cats retired Williams's number.

== Personal life and death ==
Williams was an extra in the 1950 movie The Jackie Robinson Story. Before Williams became a major league manager in 1967, he appeared on the television quiz shows Match Game and the original Hollywood Squares. According to Peter Marshall's Backstage with the Original Hollywood Squares, Williams won $50,000 as a contestant on the latter show.

Williams married Norma Mussato, with whom he had three children, Marc, Rick, and Kathi. His son, Rick Williams, a former minor league pitcher and major league pitching coach, became a professional scout for the Atlanta Braves.

Dick Williams died of a ruptured aortic aneurysm at a hospital near his home in Henderson, Nevada, on July 7, 2011. Norma Williams died on August 4, 2011, at the age of 79.

=== Arrest ===
In January 2000, Williams pleaded no contest to indecent exposure charges in Florida. The complaint against him alleged that he was "walking naked and masturbating" on the balcony outside his hotel room. Williams subsequently stated that he was not aware of the details of the complaint when he pleaded no contest, and that although he was standing naked at the balcony door, he was not on the balcony and was not masturbating.

This occurred just weeks before Baseball Hall of Fame balloting by the Veterans Committee. Williams's arrest appeared to impact consideration by the committee, and he would not be inducted to the Baseball Hall of Fame until 2008. "What happened to me down in Fort Myers when I was arrested evidently hurt me quite a bit", Williams told The New York Times.

== See also ==
- List of Major League Baseball managers with most career ejections
- List of Major League Baseball managers with most career wins

Sporting positions
Preceded by Sparky Anderson	Toronto Maple Leafs manager 1965–1966	Succeeded by Eddie Kasko
Preceded by Peanuts Lowrey	Montreal Expos third-base coach 1970	Succeeded by Don Zimmer
