= Jerry Bell (baseball executive) =

American baseball executive

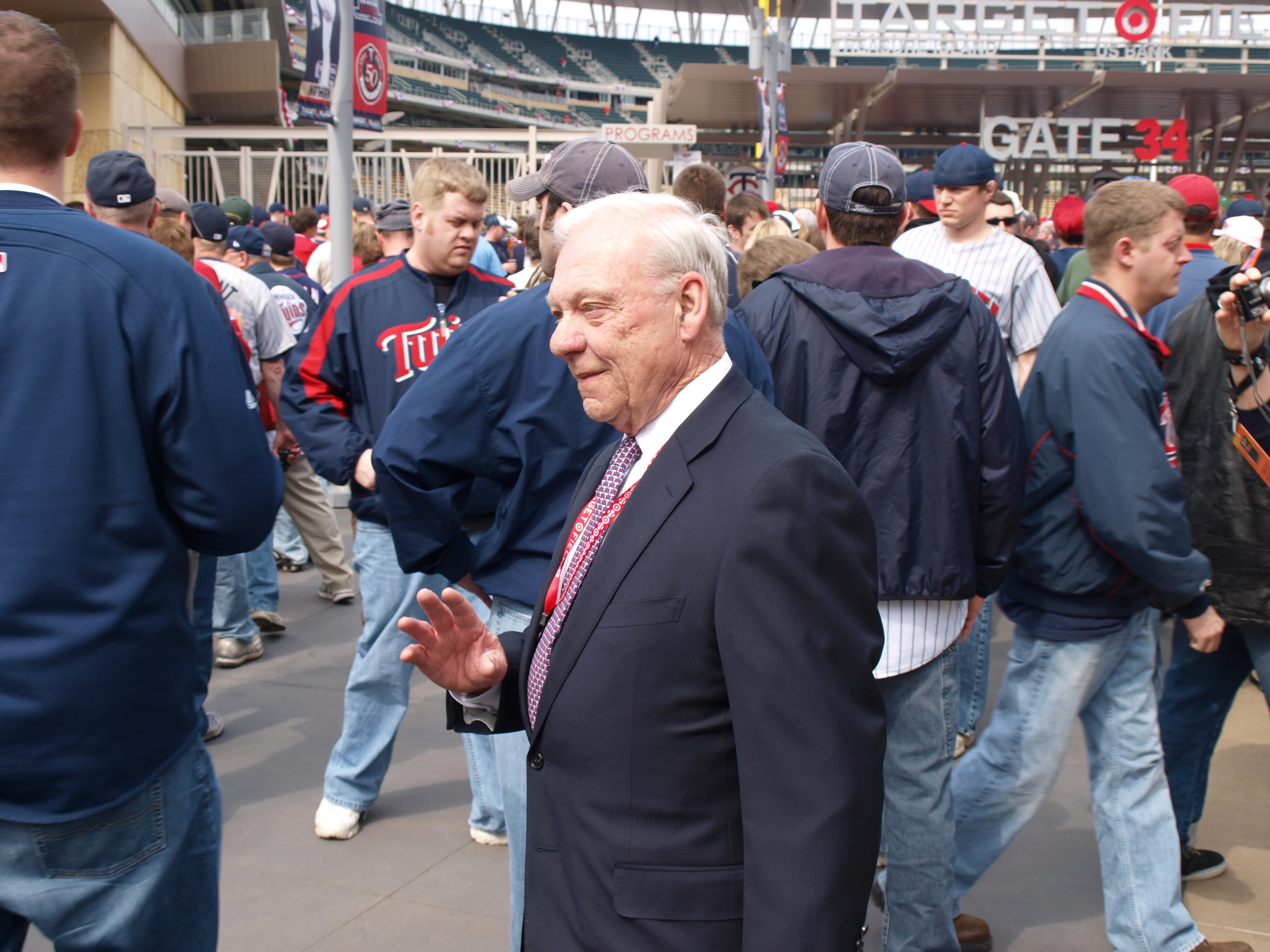
Jerry Bell on April 12, 2010.

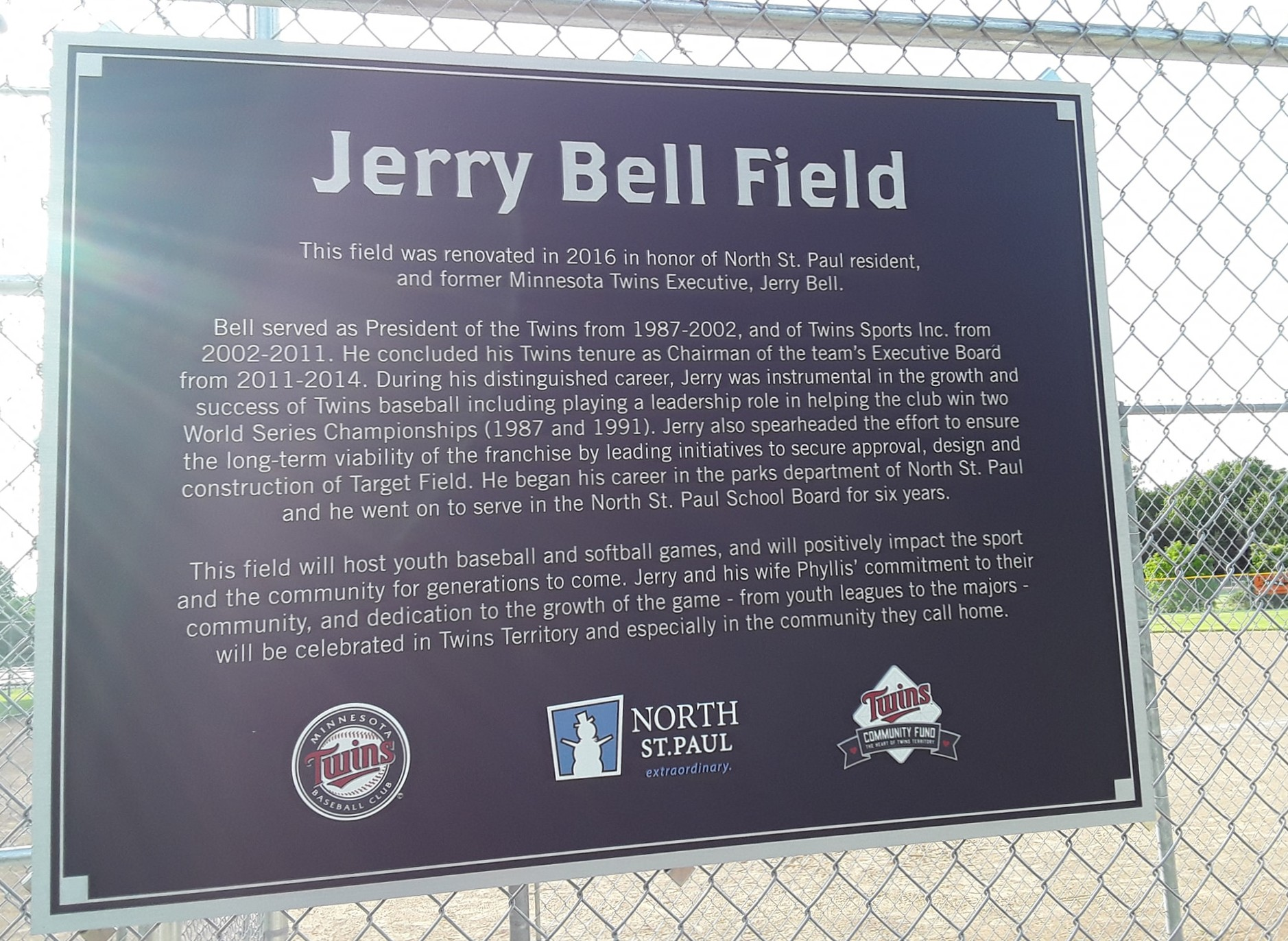
Jerry Bell Field is a baseball field in Casey Lake Park, North Saint Paul named in honor of Jerry in 2017.

T. Geron "Jerry" Bell (born 1937) is a former executive in Major League Baseball who served as president of the Minnesota Twins from 1987 to 2002, and president of its holding company, Twins Sports Inc., from 2002 until his retirement in 2011.

He grew up in North St. Paul, Minnesota, graduating from North High School in 1959. A baseball field was named in his honor in 2017 in his hometown.

Bell was inducted into the Twins Hall of Fame on August 4, 2019.
