= Andre Dawson =

American baseball player (born 1954)

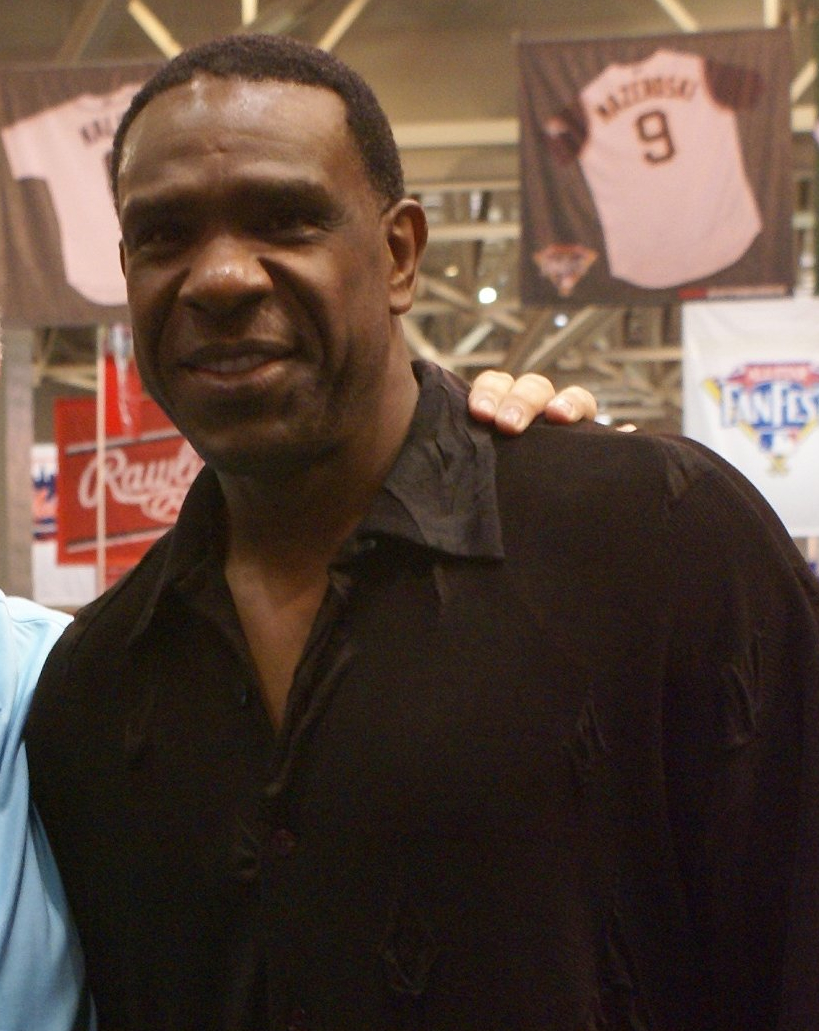
- Dawson in 2009
- Outfielder
- Born: July 10, 1954 (age 72); Miami, Florida, U.S.
- Batted: Right Threw: Right

MLB debut
- September 11, 1976, for the Montreal Expos

Last MLB appearance
- September 29, 1996, for the Florida Marlins

MLB statistics
- Batting average: .279
- Hits: 2,774
- Home runs: 438
- Runs batted in: 1,591
- Stats at Baseball Reference

Teams
- Montreal Expos (1976–1986); Chicago Cubs (1987–1992); Boston Red Sox (1993–1994); Florida Marlins (1995–1996)

Career highlights and awards
- 8× All-Star (1981–1983, 1987–1991); NL MVP (1987); NL Rookie of the Year (1977); 8× Gold Glove Award (1980–1985, 1987, 1988); 4× Silver Slugger Award (1980, 1981, 1983, 1987); NL home run leader (1987); NL RBI leader (1987); Montreal Expos No. 10 retired; Montreal Expos Hall of Fame; Washington Nationals Ring of Honor; Chicago Cubs Hall of Fame

Member of the National

Baseball Hall of Fame
- Induction: 2010
- Vote: 77.9% (ninth ballot)

Andre Nolan Dawson (born July 10, 1954), nicknamed "the Hawk" and "Awesome Dawson", is an American former professional baseball outfielder who played 21 seasons in Major League Baseball (MLB). He played for four different teams as a center and right fielder, spending most of his career with the Montreal Expos and Chicago Cubs.

An 8-time National League (NL) All-Star, he was named the league's Rookie of the Year in 1977 after batting .282 with 19 home runs and 65 runs batted in (RBI), and won the Most Valuable Player Award in 1987 after leading the league with 49 homers and 137 RBI; he had been runner-up for the award in both 1981 and 1983. He batted .300 five times, drove in 100 runs four times and had 13 seasons of 20 home runs. A strong base-runner early in his career, he also stole 30 bases three times. He is one of eight MLB players with at least 300 home runs and 300 stolen bases during his career.

Dawson was a center fielder until knee problems – worsened by the artificial surface at Olympic Stadium – forced his shift to right field, followed by his move to a team which played on grass. He led the NL in outfield putouts three consecutive years (1981–1983), and won eight Gold Glove Awards for fielding excellence. Dawson was known for his incredible work ethic and study of the game. He was often seen in the dugout with a clipboard in-hand documenting pitches and pitcher tendencies. This was long before such practices were common-place and such information was readily available. Upon his retirement, his NL totals of 409 home runs and 962 extra base hits both ranked tenth in league history; he also ranked seventh in NL history in games as an outfielder (2,303), and sixth in both outfield putouts (5,116) and total chances (5,366). He set Expos franchise records for career games, at bats, runs scored, hits, doubles, triples, home runs, runs batted in, extra base hits, total bases, and steals, all of which have since been broken variously by Tim Raines, Tim Wallach and Vladimir Guerrero. In 2010, Dawson was inducted into the Baseball Hall of Fame.

== Early life ==
Dawson grew up in Florida as the oldest of eight children. His father was a major general in the United States Army and often absent, leaving Dawson to look after his seven younger siblings while his mother worked. Dawson would pay his younger brothers in cookies to toss him rocks for him to hit with a broomstick as batting practice.

Dawson's nickname, "The Hawk", was given to him by an uncle at a very early age. Dawson used to work out with a men's team that would hit him ground balls at practice. Dawson's uncle told him that most kids his age would shy away from the ball, but Dawson attacked the ball like a hawk.

Dawson attended and graduated from Southwest Miami Senior High School in 1972. In high school, he suffered multiple knee injuries which hampered his athletic development. He did not draw any attention from professional scouts or college recruiters and took out student loans in order to enroll at Florida A&M University.

At Florida A&M, Dawson walked on to the Rattlers baseball team as a freshman. He spent three years at Florida A&M which he later said paved the way for his future.

== Playing career ==
=== Montreal Expos ===
Dawson was selected by the Expos in the 11th round (pick #250) of the 1975 Major League Baseball draft. He played in 24 major league games in 1976 after making his debut on September 11. His stardom rose in 1977 when he became an everyday outfielder for the Expos, and batted .282 with 19 home runs and 21 stolen bases. He was awarded the 1977 Rookie of the Year in the National League, narrowly beating out Steve Henderson of the New York Mets. Dawson had a blend of power and speed, hitting at least 20 home runs in seven seasons with the Expos, and stealing at least 20 bases in his first seven seasons. Dawson, playing primarily center field for the Expos, also became an excellent defensive player, gaining his first of eight Gold Glove Awards in 1980. Based on his all-around excellence, Dawson was second in the National League MVP voting in 1981 (won by Mike Schmidt) and second again in 1983 (won by Dale Murphy). He was voted the Montreal Expos Player of the Year in 1981 and 1983.

Dawson played 1,443 games with the Expos, fourth highest in franchise history, and set single-season club records for home runs (32, now seventh), RBI (113, now fourth), extra base hits (78, now seventh), and sacrifice flies (18, still first). He still holds the Expos career record for sacrifice flies (71), and is the only player to hit 200 home runs and steal 200 bases with Montreal. During his Expos days, Dawson hit two home runs in the same inning twice: at Atlanta–Fulton County Stadium against the Atlanta Braves on July 30, 1978 and at Wrigley Field against his future team, the Chicago Cubs, on September 24, 1985. As of 2021, Dawson, Willie McCovey, Jeff King, Alex Rodriguez, and Edwin Encarnación are the only five players to hit two home runs in one inning twice.

In 1984, Dawson appeared in The Cap, a short film about a young boy living in Montreal who was given a baseball cap by Dawson.

=== Chicago Cubs ===
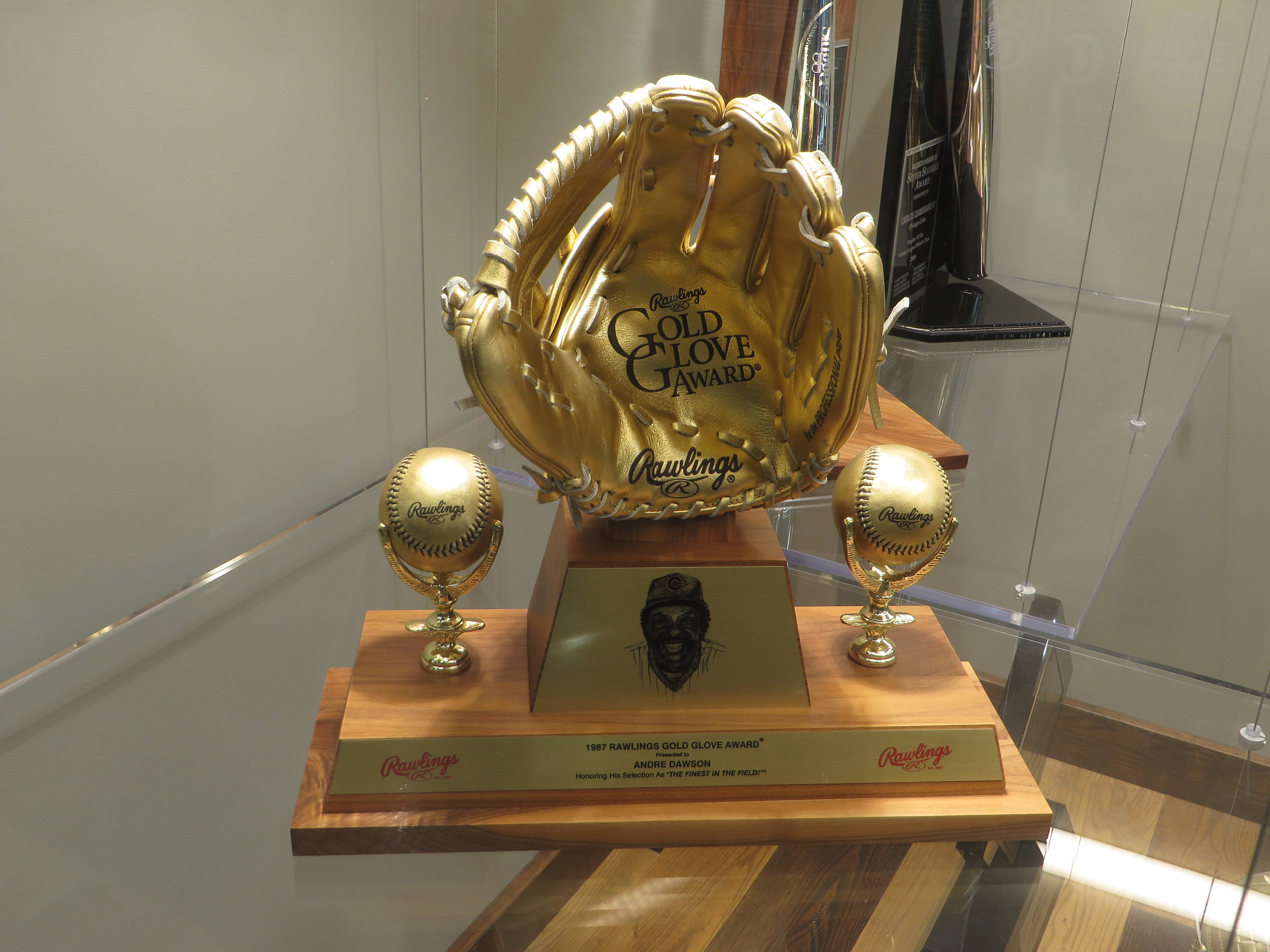
The 1987 Gold Glove Award trophy, awarded to Dawson during his tenure with the Chicago Cubs

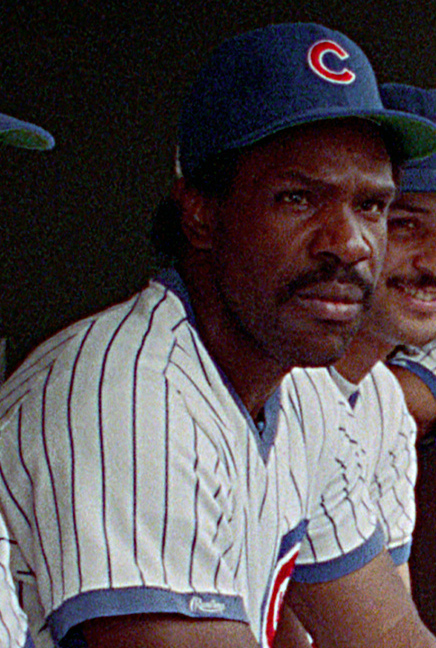
Dawson with the Chicago Cubs in 1988.

Dawson played for the Expos until after the 1986 season when he became a free agent and sought a team whose home field had natural grass, as his knee injuries were aggravated by Olympic Stadium's artificial turf. However, due to collusion on the part of the Major League Baseball owners, he was unable to attract offers.

Dawson campaigned for the Cubs to sign him during the off-season, however general manager Dallas Green resisted, insisting the Cubs would start Brian Dayett in right field (Dawson had moved from center field to right field in his final two seasons with the Expos, due to the condition of his knees), and that one player could not make a 71–91 team a 91–71 team. When the Cubs opened camp in Mesa, Arizona, that spring, Dawson and his agent Dick Moss arrived with a signed blank contract in an attempt to secure a contract with the Cubs. Dawson and Moss' stunt was derided as a "dog and pony show" by Green. After reviewing the contract, Green reached an agreement with Moss on a salary of $500,000 ($1,416,960 in today's dollars), second-lowest on the team among regulars, and added bonuses of $150,000 if he did not go on the disabled list by the All-Star Game break and $50,000 if he made the All-Star team. He earned both. The team also wrote in $100,000 bonuses if Dawson was MVP of either the league championship series or the World Series, but did not add a clause for National League MVP. While he won the NL MVP, the Cubs did not make the playoffs, so he had no chance to earn the NLCS or World Series MVP.

He became the Cubs' starting right fielder, and hit an MLB-leading 49 home runs (tied with Oakland Athletics rookie Mark McGwire), the most a player had hit since George Foster in 1977 and Willie Mays in 1965. He was named the league's MVP, finally winning after the two years as runner-up in Montreal. He also earned his fourth All-Star nod and won the Home Run Derby that year. Although the Cubs held first place for nearly half of May and remained in contention through July, the team finished the 1987 season 76–85, last in the National League East.

Dawson was the first player to win a league MVP trophy from a last place team. Dawson played five more seasons with the Cubs, and was one of the franchise's most popular players during that time. His worst individual season came in 1989 when the Cubs won the National League East title. During the NL Championship Series that year, Dawson batted .105 as the San Francisco Giants beat the Cubs 4 games to 1. Dawson's .507 career slugging percentage with the Cubs is fourth highest in team history.

=== Later career ===
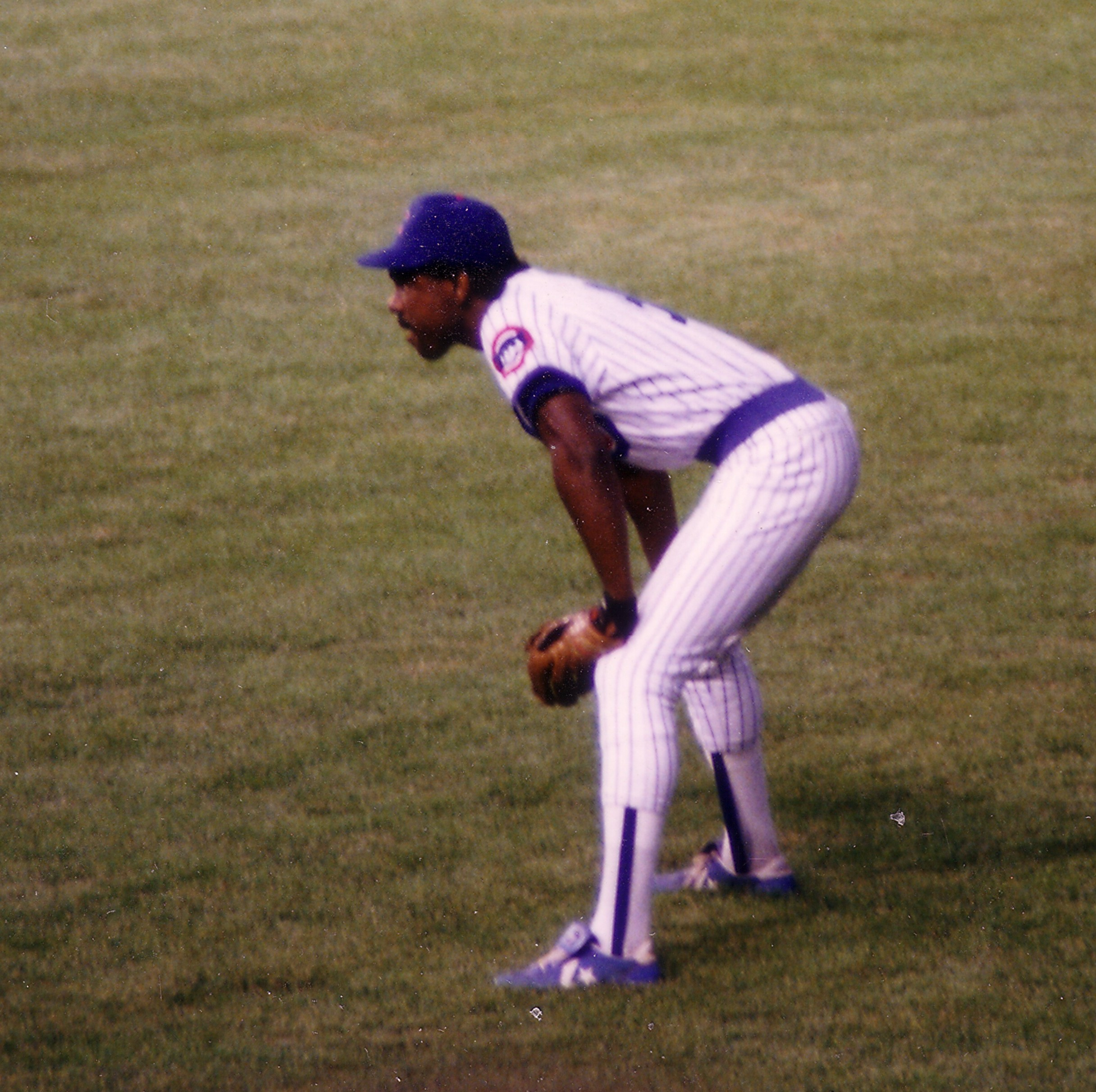
Dawson in right field at Wrigley Field, August 1988.

In October 1992 the Red Sox signed Dawson as a free agent. Dawson hit his 400th career home run with the Red Sox on April 15 at Fenway Park. Dawson sustained a knee injury early in the 1993 season in a game against the Texas Rangers which limited him to only 121 games in his first year with the Red Sox: "I got caught between sliding and standing up on a passed ball. I was on second base, and I took a chop step between strides and hit the corner of the third-base bag. I had knee surgery and [Boston] decided to use me in the DH role."

Dawson would have knee surgery the following year as well, and only managed to play 75 games in his second and final season with Boston. Dawson played his last two years with the Florida Marlins in Miami, where he was born and raised. During the 1995 season, he became an unexpected regular starter, despite his age and history with injuries, due to an injury to outfielder Gary Sheffield. He played somewhat sparingly with the team the following year, retiring after the 1996 season. In his final game, Dawson was removed from the field as a final farewell to the fans and the game. The fans gave him a standing ovation as Dawson walked off the field.

== Accomplishments ==
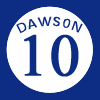
Andre Dawson's number 10 was retired by the Montreal Expos in 1997.

Dawson finished his career with 2,774 hits, 438 home runs, 314 stolen bases, and 1,591 RBI. He is one of only eight players in major league history to record over 300 home runs and 300 stolen bases in his career (300-300 club); the other players to accomplish this are Barry Bonds, Willie Mays, Bobby Bonds, Reggie Sanders, Steve Finley, Alex Rodriguez and Carlos Beltrán. Dawson is also one of only five members of the 400 HR-300 SB club, along with Barry Bonds, Willie Mays, Alex Rodriguez, and Carlos Beltrán.

In 1997, Dawson's #10 was retired by the Montreal Expos in his honor (the number had been previously retired for Rusty Staub). After the franchise moved to Washington, the Montreal Canadiens raised a banner in the Bell Centre to commemorate all of the retired Expos numbers, including Dawson's. In 2010 the Washington Nationals franchise placed Dawson in its "Ring of Honor" at Nationals Park. In 2019, Dawson was inducted into the National College Baseball Hall of Fame.

=== Hall of Fame ===
Dawson was elected to the Baseball Hall of Fame in 2010, his ninth year of eligibility, rising from an initial vote total of 45.3% in 2002 to 77.9% in 2010.

The major impediments to Dawson's election to the Hall had been his ordinary career .323 on-base percentage (albeit accumulated before OBP was even a statistic, and many multi-time All-Stars and even Hall of Famers had even lower), the comparison of his statistics to those of sluggers who played after him in the steroid era, and his lack of World Series appearances. Cubs teammate Ryne Sandberg campaigned for Dawson's induction during his speech at his own Hall of Fame induction ceremony in 2005: "No player in baseball history worked harder, suffered more or did it better than Andre Dawson. He's the best I've ever seen. I watched him win an MVP for a last-place team in 1987 [with the Cubs], and it was the most unbelievable thing I've ever seen in baseball. He did it the right way, the natural way, and he did it in the field and on the bases and in every way, and I hope he will stand up here someday."

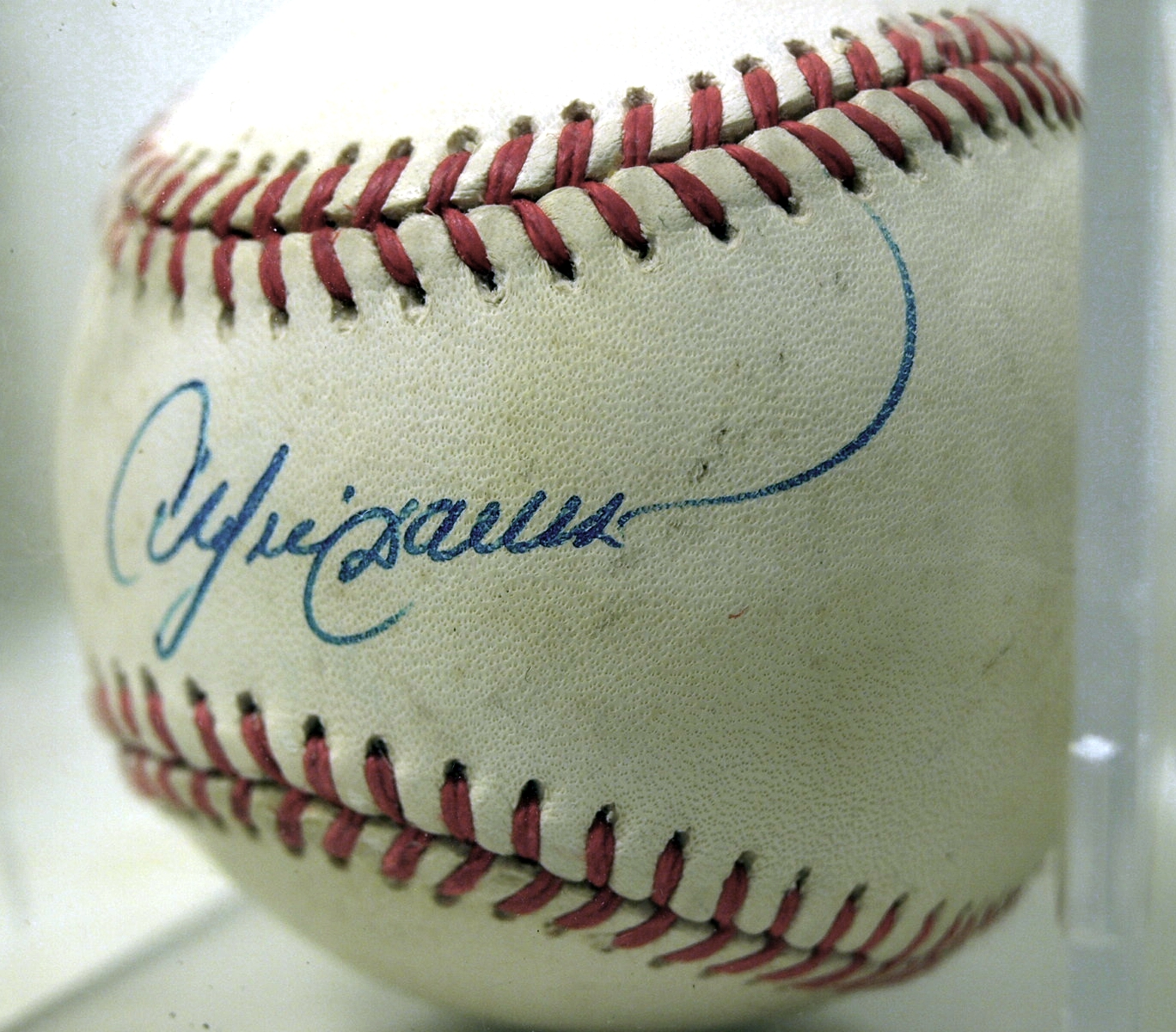
Andre Dawson's signature

==== Cap logo ====
Dawson's Hall of Fame plaque originally depicted him with a Montreal Expos cap. Dawson was the second player in the Hall of Fame whose plaque depicted him with an Expos logo, after Gary Carter. Though Dawson had played most of his 21-year career with Montreal, he publicly expressed his disappointment with the decision, saying it was "a little gut-wrenching" to find out he would not go in as a Chicago Cub. He also stated the following: "I respect the Hall of Fame’s decision to put an Expos logo on my cap, and I understand their responsibility to make sure the logo represents the greatest impact in my career." Dawson's reluctance to be enshrined as an Expo stemmed, in part, from the breakdown of his relationship with the team during MLB's collusion scandal of 1986–87, when he claimed the team not only "threw him out" of Montreal but tried to prevent other teams from signing him as a free agent. In late 2023, Dawson sent a letter to the Hall of Fame again requesting that the cap on his plaque be changed to a Cubs hat. In 2026, the Hall of Fame agreed to recast his plaque with no team logo.

While Dawson played only six years with the Cubs, five of his eight All-Star appearances were as a Cub, and his only MVP award came in his first year with the team in 1987. The Hall noted that "Dawson had 1,575 of his 2,774 hits as an Expo, won six of his eight Gold Glove awards in Montreal and led the Expos to their only postseason series win," the 1981 NLDS win that was also the only postseason win in Dawson's career.

== Retirement and personal life ==
Dawson married the former Vanessa Turner and had two children, Darius in August 1989 and Amber in September 1990.

Shortly after retiring as a player, Dawson returned to the Marlins to accept a position in the team's front office, where he got his first World Series ring in 2003.

Dawson owns the Paradise Memorial Funeral Home in Richmond Heights, Florida. He entered the funeral business in 2003, investing in a funeral home his younger brother owned, and became the owner and operator of Paradise Memorial in 2008. In an April 2020 Associated Press story on how he and his business dealt with the COVID-19 pandemic, he said, "It’s very sad. Because people mourn and grieve differently, and they’re not getting through that process as they would under normal circumstances. You see a lot of hurt and pain." At that time, his wife Vanessa was the office manager, while an uncle ran day-to-day operations.

Dawson also owned The Mahogany Grille, a soul food restaurant in Miami Gardens, Florida.

Dawson has regularly attended Chicago Cubs functions since his retirement and is a fan favorite. Dawson appeared in a 2012 "Discount Double-Check" commercial for State Farm Insurance with former Cubs pitcher Kerry Wood.

Dawson released his autobiography, If You Love This Game: An MVP's Life in Baseball, in May 2012.

Though Dawson batted and threw right-handed, he writes with his left hand.

== See also ==
- List of Major League Baseball career home run leaders
- List of Major League Baseball career hits leaders
- List of Major League Baseball career doubles leaders
- List of Major League Baseball career runs scored leaders
- List of Major League Baseball career runs batted in leaders
- List of Major League Baseball career total bases leaders
- List of Major League Baseball career stolen bases leaders
- List of Major League Baseball players to hit for the cycle
- List of Major League Baseball annual runs batted in leaders
- List of Major League Baseball annual home run leaders

== Notes ==
- James, Bill (1988). The Bill James Baseball Abstract. Ballantine Books / Random House.
- James, Bill (2001). The new Bill James Historical Baseball Abstract. The Free Press / Simon & Schuster. ISBN 9780684806976.

Awards and achievements
| Preceded by Darrell Evans; Bo Díaz; Bobby Bonilla | National League Player of the Month; June 1983; August 1987; May 1990 | Succeeded by Dusty Baker; Darryl Strawberry; Ryne Sandberg |
| Preceded by Kirby Puckett | Hitting for the cycle April 29, 1987 | Succeeded by Candy Maldonado |
