= 1974 Major League Baseball postseason =

1974 Major League Baseball playoffs

Tournament details
- Dates: October 5–17, 1974
- Teams: 4

Final positions
- Champions: Oakland Athletics (8th title)
- Runners-up: Los Angeles Dodgers

Tournament statistics
- Games played: 13
- Attendance: 604,881 (46,529 per game)
- Most HRs: Four tied (2)
- Most SBs: Davey Lopes (LA) (5)
- Most Ks (as pitcher): Don Sutton (LA) (25)

Awards
- MVP: Rollie Fingers (OAK)

The 1974 Major League Baseball postseason was the playoff tournament of Major League Baseball for the 1974 season. The winners of each division advance to the postseason and face each other in a League Championship Series to determine the pennant winners that face each other in the World Series.

In the American League, the Baltimore Orioles returned for the fifth time in the past six seasons, and the Oakland Athletics were making their fourth straight postseason appearance.

In the National League, the Pittsburgh Pirates made their fourth appearance in the past five seasons, and the Los Angeles Dodgers made their first postseason appearance of the division era, returning for the first time since 1966.

The playoffs began on October 5, 1974, and concluded on October 17, 1974, with the Oakland Athletics defeating their fellow California rival in the Los Angeles Dodgers in five games in the 1974 World Series. The Athletics pulled off a three-peat, becoming only the second franchise in MLB to accomplish such a feat, the other being the New York Yankees.

== Teams ==
American League Teams National League Teams

The following teams qualified for the postseason:

=== American League ===
- Baltimore Orioles – 91–71, AL East champions
- Oakland Athletics – 90–72, AL West champions

=== National League ===
- Pittsburgh Pirates – 88–74, NL East champions
- Los Angeles Dodgers – 102–60, NL West champions

== Playoff bracket ==
League Championship Series (ALCS, NLCS)
East	Baltimore	1
West	Oakland	3
East	Pittsburgh	1
West	Los Angeles	3

World Series
AL	Oakland	4
NL	Los Angeles	1

== American League Championship Series ==
=== Baltimore Orioles vs. Oakland Athletics ===
Oakland won the series, 3–1.

Game	Date	Score	Location	Time	Attendance
1	October 5	Baltimore Orioles – 6, Oakland Athletics – 3	Oakland-Alameda County Coliseum	2:29	41,609
2	October 6	Baltimore Orioles – 0, Oakland Athletics – 5	Oakland-Alameda County Coliseum	2:28	42,810
3	October 8	Oakland Athletics – 1, Baltimore Orioles – 0	Memorial Stadium	1:57	32,060
4	October 9	Oakland Athletics – 2, Baltimore Orioles – 1	Memorial Stadium	2:46	28,136

This was the third postseason meeting between the Athletics and Orioles (1971, 1973). The Athletics once again defeated the Orioles, this time in four games, to advance to the World Series for the third year in a row (in the process denying a rematch of the 1966 World Series between the Orioles and Dodgers).

Home runs from Brooks Robinson, Paul Blair, and Bobby Grich chased Catfish Hunter from the mound as the Orioles stole Game 1 on the road. Ken Holtzman pitched a five-hit complete game shutout as the Athletics won 5–0 to even the series headed to Baltimore. Game 3 was a complete game pitcher’s duel between Vida Blue and Jim Palmer, which was won by the former as Sal Bando’s solo homer in the top of the fourth proved to be all Blue needed, as he pitched a two-hit complete game shutout to give the Athletics the edge in the series. Hunter pitched seven solid innings and Rollie Fingers shut the door on the Orioles in the bottom of the ninth to clinch the Athletics’ third straight pennant.

With the win, the Athletics moved up to 2–1 against the Orioles all-time in the postseason. The Athletics attempted to win a fourth straight pennant the next year, but were swept by the Boston Red Sox. They would win their next pennant in 1988 in a sweep over the Red Sox before coming up short in the World Series.

The Orioles would return to the ALCS in 1979, and won the pennant over the California Angels in four games before falling in the World Series.

== National League Championship Series ==
=== Los Angeles Dodgers vs. Pittsburgh Pirates ===
Los Angeles won the series, 3–1.

Game	Date	Score	Location	Time	Attendance
1	October 5	Los Angeles Dodgers – 3, Pittsburgh Pirates – 0	Three Rivers Stadium	2:25	40,638
2	October 6	Los Angeles Dodgers – 5, Pittsburgh Pirates – 2	Three Rivers Stadium	2:44	49,247
3	October 8	Pittsburgh Pirates – 7, Los Angeles Dodgers – 0	Dodger Stadium	2:41	55,953
4	October 9	Pittsburgh Pirates – 1, Los Angeles Dodgers – 12	Dodger Stadium	2:36	54,424

The Dodgers defeated the Pirates in four games to return to the World Series for the first time since 1966.

The Dodgers stole Game 1 in Pittsburgh as Don Sutton pitched a four-hit complete-game shutout. Andy Messersmith pitched six innings of shutout ball and the Dodgers’ bullpen stopped a potential rally by the Pirates to take a 2–0 series lead headed to Los Angeles. In Game 3, Bruce Kison and relief pitcher Ramón Hernández shutout the Dodgers’ offense as the Pirates prevailed in a blowout win. However, the Dodgers would respond in Game 4 by thrashing the Pirates by an eleven run margin of victory to clinch the pennant. The Dodgers' 12–1 blowout win in Game 4 was the largest margin of victory in an LCS game, which would be broken by the Atlanta Braves in the fifth and seventh games of the 1996 NLCS.

This was the first of three NL pennants won by the Dodgers during the 1970s, as they would win it again in 1977 and 1978, defeating the Philadelphia Phillies in four games both times, but they would fall in the World Series each time.

The Pirates would return to the NLCS the next year, but were swept by the eventual World Series champion Cincinnati Reds. They would win their next pennant in 1979 over the Reds in a sweep en route to their most recent championship.

== 1974 World Series ==
=== Oakland Athletics (AL) vs. Los Angeles Dodgers (NL) ===
Oakland won the series, 4–1.

Game	Date	Score	Location	Time	Attendance
1	October 12	Oakland Athletics – 3, Los Angeles Dodgers – 2	Dodger Stadium	2:43	55,974
2	October 13	Oakland Athletics – 2, Los Angeles Dodgers – 3	Dodger Stadium	2:40	55,989
3	October 15	Los Angeles Dodgers – 2, Oakland Athletics – 3	Oakland–Alameda County Coliseum	2:35	49,347
4	October 16	Los Angeles Dodgers – 2, Oakland Athletics – 5	Oakland–Alameda County Coliseum	2:17	49,347
5	October 17	Los Angeles Dodgers – 2, Oakland Athletics – 3	Oakland–Alameda County Coliseum	2:23	49,347

This was the first World Series matchup between the Athletics and Dodgers. This was the first all-California World Series, the first World Series since 1956 to feature two teams representing the same state, as well as the first World Series matchup between teams from the Greater Los Angeles area and the San Francisco Bay Area. The Athletics upset the 102-win Dodgers in five games to successfully three-peat as World Series champions, becoming the second franchise in MLB history to accomplish such a feat after the New York Yankees.

Despite ending in five games, each game of the series was decided by three runs or less. Rollie Fingers helped fend off a late rally by the Dodgers as the Athletics stole Game 1 on the road. In Game 2, Dodgers' closer Mike Marshall fended off a late rally by the Athletics in the bottom of the ninth inning to even the series headed to Oakland. In Game 3, the Athletics held off another late rally by the Dodgers to win by one run. In Game 4, the Athletics overcame a one-run Dodgers' lead in the bottom of the sixth with four unanswered runs to win and go up 3–1 in the series. In Game 5, Fingers gained his second save of the series as the Athletics prevailed by one run to clinch the title.

This was the second of four consecutive losses in the World Series for the Dodgers. They would return to the World Series in 1977 and 1978, but lost both to their old American League rival in the New York Yankees in six games. The Dodgers would eventually win the Fall Classic again in 1981 over the Yankees in six games.

The Athletics would win their next and most recent championship in 1989 over their cross-town rival San Francisco Giants in a sweep, which would ultimately be their last during their time in Oakland, as the team would move to Las Vegas 36 years later. As of 2026, this is the last time the Athletics won the World Series at home.

Both teams would meet again in the World Series in 1988, where the Dodgers returned the favor and upset the heavily favored Athletics in five games in a reverse of this World Series.

== Broadcasting ==
NBC televised all postseason games nationally in the United States. Each team's local broadcaster also televised coverage of LCS games.
