= 1974 Los Angeles Dodgers season =

Major League Baseball season

1974 Los Angeles Dodgers
- National League champion National League West champions
- League: National League
- Division: West
- Ballpark: Dodger Stadium
- City: Los Angeles
- Record: 102–60 (.630)
- Divisional place: 1st
- Owners: Walter O'Malley, heirs of James Mulvey
- President: Peter O'Malley
- General managers: Al Campanis
- Managers: Walter Alston
- Television: KTTV (11)
- Radio: KABC; Vin Scully, Jerry Doggett; XEGM; Jaime Jarrín, Rudy Hoyos

The 1974 Los Angeles Dodgers season was the 85th season for the Los Angeles Dodgers franchise in Major League Baseball (MLB), their 17th season in Los Angeles, California, and their 13th season playing their home games at Dodger Stadium in Los Angeles California. The Dodgers won the National League West Division by four games over the Cincinnati Reds, then beat the Pittsburgh Pirates in the NLCS before losing to the Oakland Athletics in the World Series.

== Offseason ==
- October 27, 1973: Rick Auerbach was purchased by the Dodgers from the Milwaukee Brewers.
- December 3, 1973: Sergio Ferrer was drafted from the Dodgers by the Minnesota Twins in the 1973 rule 5 draft.
- December 5, 1973: Willie Davis was traded by the Dodgers to the Montreal Expos for Mike Marshall.
- December 5, 1973: Pete Richert was traded by the Dodgers to the St. Louis Cardinals for Tommie Agee.
- December 6, 1973: Claude Osteen and Dave Culpepper (minors) were traded by the Dodgers to the Houston Astros for Jimmy Wynn.

== Regular season ==
Mike Marshall set a record by pitching in 106 games in 1974, a record that still stands today.

=== Season standings ===
NL West
Team	W	L	Pct.	GB	Home	Road
Los Angeles Dodgers	102	60	.630	—	52‍–‍29	50‍–‍31
Cincinnati Reds	98	64	.605	4	50‍–‍31	48‍–‍33
Atlanta Braves	88	74	.543	14	46‍–‍35	42‍–‍39
Houston Astros	81	81	.500	21	46‍–‍35	35‍–‍46
San Francisco Giants	72	90	.444	30	37‍–‍44	35‍–‍46
San Diego Padres	60	102	.370	42	36‍–‍45	24‍–‍57

=== Record vs. opponents ===
1974 National League record Sources:
Team	ATL	CHC	CIN	HOU	LAD	MON	NYM	PHI	PIT	SD	SF	STL
Atlanta	—	4–8	7–11–1	6–12	8–10	9–3	8–4	8–4	4–8	17–1	8–10	9–3
Chicago	8–4	—	5–7	4–8	2–10	5–13	8–10	8–10	9–9	6–6	6–6	5–13
Cincinnati	11–7–1	7–5	—	14–4	6–12	6–6	9–3	8–4	8–4	12–6	11–7	6–6
Houston	12–6	8–4	4–14	—	5–13	6–6	6–6	6–6	5–7	7–11	10–8	8–4
Los Angeles	10–8	10–2	12–6	13–5	—	8–4	5–7	6–6	4–8	16–2	12–6	6–6
Montreal	3–9	13–5	6–6	6–6	4–8	—	9–9	11–7	9–9	6–6	4–8	8–9
New York	4–8	10–8	3–9	6–6	7–5	9–9	—	7–11	7–11	6–6	6–6	6–12
Philadelphia	4-8	10–8	4–8	6–6	6–6	7–11	11–7	—	10–8	5–7	8–4	9–9
Pittsburgh	8–4	9–9	4–8	7–5	8–4	9–9	11–7	8–10	—	9–3	8–4	7–11
San Diego	1–17	6–6	6–12	7–11	2–16	6–6	6–6	7–5	3–9	—	11–7	5–7
San Francisco	10–8	6–6	7–11	8–10	6–12	8–4	6–6	4–8	4–8	7–11	—	6–6
St. Louis	3–9	13–5	6–6	4–8	6–6	9–8	12–6	9–9	11–7	7–5	6–6	—

=== Opening Day lineup ===
Opening Day starters
Name	Position
Davey Lopes	Second baseman
Bill Buckner	First baseman
Jimmy Wynn	Center fielder
Joe Ferguson	Catcher
Willie Crawford	Right fielder
Ron Cey	Third baseman
Von Joshua	Left fielder
Bill Russell	Shortstop
Don Sutton	Starting pitcher

=== Notable transactions ===
- April 3, 1974: Bruce Ellingsen was traded by the Dodgers to the Cleveland Indians for Pedro Guerrero.
- July 11, 1974: Gail Hopkins was purchased by the Dodgers from the Hawaii Islanders.

=== Roster ===
1974 Los Angeles Dodgers
Roster
Pitchers: 21 Jim Brewer; 44 Al Downing; 49 Charlie Hough; 40 Rex Hudson; 25 Tommy John; 28 Mike Marshall; 47 Andy Messersmith; 31 Doug Rau; 36 Rick Rhoden; 41 Greg Shanahan; 50 Eddie Solomon; 20 Don Sutton; 38 Geoff Zahn	Catchers: 13 Joe Ferguson; 16 Gail Hopkins; 9 Kevin Pasley; 7 Steve Yeager; Infielders: 1 Rick Auerbach; 10 Ron Cey; 14 Iván DeJesús; 6 Steve Garvey; 34 Lee Lacy; 15 Davey Lopes; 5 Ken McMullen; 8 Jerry Royster; 18 Bill Russell	Outfielders: 2 Orlando Alvarez; 22 Bill Buckner; 27 Willie Crawford; 43 John Hale; 12 Von Joshua; 46 Charlie Manuel; 11 Manny Mota; 17 Tom Paciorek; 23 Jimmy Wynn	Manager: 24 Walter Alston; Coaches: 26 Red Adams; 54 Monty Basgall; 58 Mark Cresse; 19 Jim Gilliam; 52 Tommy Lasorda

== Game log ==
=== Regular season ===
Legend
	Dodgers win
	Dodgers loss
	Postponement
	Clinched division
**Bold**	Dodgers team member

1974 regular season game log: 102–60 (Home: 52–29; Away: 50–31)
April: 17–6 (Home: 11–3; Away: 6–3)

#	Date	Time (PT)	Opponent	Score	Win	Loss	Save	Time of Game	Attendance	Record	Box/ Streak

May: 19–8 (Home: 9–2; Away: 10–6)

#	Date	Time (PT)	Opponent	Score	Win	Loss	Save	Time of Game	Attendance	Record	Box/ Streak

June: 16–10 (Home: 10–5; Away: 6–5)

#	Date	Time (PT)	Opponent	Score	Win	Loss	Save	Time of Game	Attendance	Record	Box/ Streak
53	June 4	7:30 p.m. PDT	Pirates	5–0	**John** (9–1)	Reuss (4–4)	—	2:18	23,472	35–18	W1
54	June 5	7:30 p.m. PDT	Pirates	3–2	**Marshall** (3–3)	Rooker (2–5)	—	2:10	25,959	36–18	W2
55	June 6	7:30 p.m. PDT	Pirates	6–0	**Messersmith** (6–1)	Brett (6–4)	—	2:03	26,717	37–18	W3
65	June 17	4:35 p.m. PDT	@ Pirates	3–7	Brett (8–4)	**Sutton** (6–6)	—	2:12	17,105	44–21	L1
66	June 18	4:35 p.m. PDT	@ Pirates	0–2	Giusti (2–2)	**John** (10–2)	Patterson (1)	2:09	15,054	44–22	L2
67	June 19	4:35 p.m. PDT	@ Pirates	3–7	Reuss (6–4)	**Rau** (5–3)	—	2:34	16,493	44–23	L3

July: 16–13 (Home: 3–6; Away: 13–7)

#	Date	Time (PT)	Opponent	Score	Win	Loss	Save	Time of Game	Attendance	Record	Box/ Streak
—	July 23	5:15 p.m. PDT	45th All-Star Game	American League vs. National League (Three Rivers Stadium, Pittsburgh, Pennsylvania)							

August: 15–12 (Home: 10–5; Away: 5–7)

#	Date	Time (PT)	Opponent	Score	Win	Loss	Save	Time of Game	Attendance	Record	Box/ Streak
119	August 16	5:05 p.m. PDT	@ Pirates	2–5	Ellis (9–8)	**Sutton** (10–9)	—	2:06	32,347	75–44	L4
120	August 17	11:15 a.m. PDT	@ Pirates	3–4	Reuss (13–9)	**Messersmith** (13–5)	Giusti (8)	2:18	18,681	75–45	L5
121	August 18	10:35 a.m. PDT	@ Pirates	3–10	Demery (4–4)	**Zahn** (2–3)	—	2:42	33,225	75–46	L6
131	August 30	7:30 p.m. PDT	Pirates	3–4	Rooker (10–10)	**Marshall** (13–10)	Giusti (9)	2:53	38,887	83–48	L1
132	August 31	7:00 p.m. PDT	Pirates	3–4	Demery (6–4)	**Zahn** (2–4)	Giusti (10)	2:22	41,653	83–49	L2

September: 17–11 (Home: 9–8; Away: 8–3)

#	Date	Time (PT)	Opponent	Score	Win	Loss	Save	Time of Game	Attendance	Record	Box/ Streak
133	September 1	1:15 p.m. PDT	Pirates	6–2	**Sutton** (13–9)	Ellis (11–9)	—	2:33	29,667	84–49	W1

October: 2–0 (Home: 0–0; Away: 2–0)

#	Date	Time (PT)	Opponent	Score	Win	Loss	Save	Time of Game	Attendance	Record	Box/ Streak

=== Detailed records ===
**National League**
Opponent	Home	Away	Total	Pct.	Runs scored	Runs allowed
**NL East**
Chicago Cubs	5–1	5–1	10–2	.833	94	56
Montreal Expos	4–2	4–2	8–4	.667	63	45
New York Mets	3–3	2–4	5–7	.417	36	42
Philadelphia Phillies	4–2	2–4	6–6	.500	41	31
Pittsburgh Pirates	4–2	0–6	4–8	.333	40	47
St. Louis Cardinals	2–4	4–2	6–6	.500	48	38
	**22–13**	**17–19**	**40–32**	**.556**	**322**	**259**
**NL West**
Atlanta Braves	5–4	5–4	10–8	.556	66	58
Cincinnati Reds	5–4	7–2	12–6	.667	79	57
Houston Astros	7–2	6–3	13–5	.722	96	61
**Los Angeles Dodgers**	—	—	—	—	—	—
San Diego Padres	8–1	8–1	16–2	.889	129	47
San Francisco Giants	5–4	7–2	12–6	.667	106	78
	**30–18**	**33–15**	**63–33**	**.656**	**476**	**301**

==== Month-by-Month ====
Month	Games	Won	Lost	Win %	RS	RA
April	23	17	6	0.739	136	66
May	27	19	8	0.704	158	109
June	26	16	10	0.615	110	84
July	29	16	13	0.108	134	106
August	27	15	12	0.556	123	96
September	28	17	11	0.607	124	91
October	2	2	0	1.000	13	9
Total	162	102	60	0.584	798	561

	Games	Won	Lost	Win %	RS	RA
Home	81	52	29	0.642	355	250
Road	81	50	31	0.617	443	311
Total	162	102	60	0.630	798	561

=== Composite Box ===
1974 Los Angeles Dodgers Inning–by–Inning Boxscore
Team	1	2	3	4	5	6	7	8	9	10	11	12	13	14	R	H	E
Opponents	70	30	65	59	64	73	74	69	40	5	6	0	0	0	561	1272	175
Dodgers	120	72	91	91	91	109	93	71	55	7	5	1	7	1	798	1511	157

=== Postseason Game log ===
1974 Postseason game log: 4–5 (Home: 2–2; Away: 2–3)
NL Championship Series: vs. Pittsburgh Pirates 3–1 (Home: 1–1; Away: 2–0)

#	Date	Time (PT)	Opponent	Score	Win	Loss	Save	Time of Game	Attendance	Series	Box Streak
1	October 5	10:00 a.m. PDT	@ Pirates	3–0	**Sutton** (1–0)	Reuss (0–1)	—	2:25	40,638	LAN 1–0	W1
2	October 6	10:00 a.m. PDT	@ Pirates	5–2	**Messersmith** (1–0)	Giusti (0–1)	—	2:43	49,247	LAN 2–0	W2
3	October 8	12:30 p.m. PDT	Pirates	0–7	Kison (1–0)	**Rau** (0–1)	—	2:41	55,953	LAN 2–1	L1
4	October 9	12:30 p.m. PDT	Pirates	12–1	**Sutton** (2–0)	Reuss (0–2)	—	2:36	54,424	LAN 3–1	W1

World Series: vs. Oakland Athletics 1–4 (Home: 1–1; Away: 0–3)

#	Date	Time (PT)	Opponent	Score	Win	Loss	Save	Time of Game	Attendance	Series	Box Streak
1	October 12	1:00 p.m. PDT	Athletics	2–3	Fingers (1–0)	**Messersmith** (0–1)	Hunter (1)	2:43	55,974	OAK 1–0	L1
2	October 13	1:00 p.m. PDT	Athletics	3–2	**Sutton** (1–0)	Blue (0–1)	**Marshall** (1)	2:40	55,989	TIE 1–1	W1
3	October 15	5:30 p.m. PDT	@ Athletics	2–3	Hunter (1–0)	**Downing** (0–1)	—	2:35	49,347	OAK 2–1	L1
4	October 16	5:30 p.m. PDT	@ Athletics	2–5	Holtzman (1–0)	**Messersmith** (0–2)	Fingers (1)	2:17	49,347	OAK 3–1	L2
5	October 17	5:30 p.m. PDT	@ Athletics	2–3	Odom (1–0)	**Marshall** (0–1)	Fingers (2)	2:23	49,347	OAK 4–1	L3

== Starting Lineups ==
=== Regular Season ===
==== Batting Order ====
1974 Regular Season Batting Order game log
April

#	Date	Opponent	1st	2nd	3rd	4th	5th	6th	7th	8th	9th

May

#	Date	Opponent	1st	2nd	3rd	4th	5th	6th	7th	8th	9th

June

#	Date	Opponent	1st	2nd	3rd	4th	5th	6th	7th	8th	9th
53	June 4	PIT									
54	June 5	PIT									
55	June 6	PIT									
65	June 17	@ PIT									
66	June 18	@ PIT									
67	June 19	@ PIT									

July

#	Date	Opponent	1st	2nd	3rd	4th	5th	6th	7th	8th	9th

August

#	Date	Opponent	1st	2nd	3rd	4th	5th	6th	7th	8th	9th
119	August 16	@ PIT									
120	August 17	@ PIT									
121	August 18	@ PIT									
131	August 30	PIT									
132	August 31	PIT									

September

#	Date	Opponent	1st	2nd	3rd	4th	5th	6th	7th	8th	9th
133	September 1	PIT									

October

#	Date	Opponent	1st	2nd	3rd	4th	5th	6th	7th	8th	9th

==== Defensive Lineup ====
1988 Regular Season Defensive Lineup game log
April

#	Date	Opponent	C	1B	2B	3B	SS	LF	CF	RF	P

May

#	Date	Opponent	C	1B	2B	3B	SS	LF	CF	RF	P

June

#	Date	Opponent	C	1B	2B	3B	SS	LF	CF	RF	P
53	June 4	PIT									
54	June 5	PIT									
55	June 6	PIT									
65	June 17	@ PIT									
66	June 18	@ PIT									
67	June 19	@ PIT									

July

#	Date	Opponent	C	1B	2B	3B	SS	LF	CF	RF	P

August

#	Date	Opponent	C	1B	2B	3B	SS	LF	CF	RF	P
119	August 16	@ PIT									
120	August 17	@ PIT									
121	August 18	@ PIT									
131	August 30	PIT									
1321	August 31	PIT									

September

#	Date	Opponent	C	1B	2B	3B	SS	LF	CF	RF	P
133	September 1	PIT									

October

#	Date	Opponent	C	1B	2B	3B	SS	LF	CF	RF	P

=== Postseason ===
==== Batting Order ====
1974 Postseason Batting Order game log
NL Championship Series: vs. Pittsburgh Pirates

#	Date	Opponent	1st	2nd	3rd	4th	5th	6th	7th	8th	9th
1	October 5	@ PIT									
2	October 6	@ PIT									
1	October 8	PIT									
1	October 9	PIT									

World Series: vs. Oakland Athletics

#	Date	Opponent	1st	2nd	3rd	4th	5th	6th	7th	8th	9th
1	October 12	OAK									
2	October 13	OAK									
3	October 15	@ OAK									
4	October 16	@ OAK									
5	October 17	@ OAK									

==== Defensive Lineup ====
1974 Postseason Defensive Lineup game log
NL Championship Series: vs. Pittsburgh Pirates

#	Date	Opponent	C	1B	2B	3B	SS	LF	CF	RF	P
1	October 5	@ PIT									
2	October 6	@ PIT									
1	October 8	PIT									
1	October 9	PIT									

World Series: vs. Oakland Athletics

#	Date	Opponent	C	1B	2B	3B	SS	LF	CF	RF	P
1	October 12	OAK									
2	October 13	OAK									
3	October 15	@ OAK									
4	October 16	@ OAK									
5	October 17	@ OAK									

== Game Umpires ==
=== Regular Season ===
1974 Regular Season Umpire game log
April

#	Date	Opponent	HP	1B	2B	3B

May

#	Date	Opponent	HP	1B	2B	3B

June

#	Date	Opponent	HP	1B	2B	3B
53	June 4	PIT	#10; John McSherry	#16; Paul Runge	#20; Ed Vargo (crew chief)	#6; Bruce Froemming
54	June 5	PIT	#16; Paul Runge	#20; Ed Vargo (crew chief)	#6; Bruce Froemming	#10; John McSherry
55	June 6	PIT	#20; Ed Vargo (crew chief)	#6; Bruce Froemming	#10; John McSherry	#16; Paul Runge
65	June 17	@ PIT	#14; Frank Pulli	#18; Ed Sudol (crew chief)	#4; Satch Davidson	#22; Lee Weyer
66	June 18	@ PIT	#18; Ed Sudol (crew chief)	#4; Satch Davidson	#22; Lee Weyer	#14; Frank Pulli
67	June 19	@ PIT	#4; Satch Davidson	#22; Lee Weyer	#14; Frank Pulli	#18; Ed Sudol (crew chief)

July

#	Date	Opponent	HP	1B	2B	3B

August

#	Date	Opponent	HP	1B	2B	3B
119	August 16	@ PIT	#6; Bruce Froemming	#16; Paul Runge	#20; Ed Vargo (crew chief)	#11; Andy Olsen
120	August 17	@ PIT	#16; Paul Runge	#20; Ed Vargo (crew chief)	#11; Andy Olsen	#6; Bruce Froemming
121	August 18	@ PIT	#20; Ed Vargo (crew chief)	#11; Andy Olsen	#6; Bruce Froemming	#16; Paul Runge
131	August 30	PIT	#23; Art Williams	#21; Harry Wendelstedt	#8; Dave Harvey (crew chief)	#3; Jerry Dale
132	August 31	PIT	#21; Harry Wendelstedt	#8; Dave Harvey (crew chief)	#3; Jerry Dale	#23; Art Williams

September

#	Date	Opponent	HP	1B	2B	3B
133	September 1	PIT	#8; Dave Harvey (crew chief)	#3; Jerry Dale	#23; Art Williams	#21; Harry Wendelstedt

October

#	Date	Opponent	HP	1B	2B	3B

=== Postseason ===
1974 Postseason Umpire game log
NL Championship Series: vs. Pittsburgh Pirates

#	Date	Opponent	HP	1B	2B	3B	LF	RF
1	October 5	@ PIT	#1; Nick Colosi	#13; Paul Pryor	#22; Lee Weyer	#10; John McSherry	#2; Shag Crawford (crew chief)	#4; Satch Davidson
2	October 6	@ PIT	#13; Paul Pryor	#22; Lee Weyer	#10; John McSherry	#2; Shag Crawford (crew chief)	#4; Satch Davidson	#1; Nick Colosi
1	October 8	PIT	#22; Lee Weyer	#10; John McSherry	#2; Shag Crawford (crew chief)	#4; Satch Davidson	#1; Nick Colosi	#13; Paul Pryor
1	October 9	PIT	#10; John McSherry	#2; Shag Crawford (crew chief)	#4; Satch Davidson	#1; Nick Colosi	#13; Paul Pryor	#22; Lee Weyer

World Series: vs. Oakland Athletics

#	Date	Opponent	HP	1B	2B	3B	LF	RF
1	October 12	OAK	#7; Tom Gorman (NL) (crew chief)	Bill Kunkel (AL)	#8; Dave Harvey (NL)	Don Denkinger (AL)	#11; Andy Olsen (NL)	Ron Luciano (AL)
2	October 13	OAK	Bill Kunkel (AL)	#8; Dave Harvey (NL)	Don Denkinger (AL)	#11; Andy Olsen (NL)	Ron Luciano (AL)	#7; Tom Gorman (NL) (crew chief)
3	October 15	@ OAK	#8; Dave Harvey (NL)	Don Denkinger (AL)	#11; Andy Olsen (NL)	Ron Luciano (AL)	#7; Tom Gorman (NL) (crew chief)	Bill Kunkel (AL)
4	October 16	@ OAK	Don Denkinger (AL)	#11; Andy Olsen (NL)	Ron Luciano (AL)	#7; Tom Gorman (NL) (crew chief)	Bill Kunkel (AL)	#8; Dave Harvey (NL)
5	October 17	@ OAK	#11; Andy Olsen (NL)	Ron Luciano (AL)	#7; Tom Gorman (NL) (crew chief)	Bill Kunkel (AL)	#8; Dave Harvey (NL)	Don Denkinger (AL)

== Player stats ==
= Indicates team leader

= Indicates league leader

=== Batting ===
==== Starters by position ====
Note: Pos = Position; G = Games played; AB = At bats; H = Hits; Avg. = Batting average; HR = Home runs; RBI = Runs batted in

Pos	Player	G	AB	H	Avg.	HR	RBI
C	Steve Yeager	94	316	84	.266	12	41
1B	Steve Garvey	156	642	200	.312	21	111
2B	Davey Lopes	145	530	141	.266	10	35
SS	Bill Russell	160	553	149	.269	5	65
3B	Ron Cey	159	577	151	.262	18	97
LF	Bill Buckner	145	580	182	.314	7	58
CF	Jim Wynn	150	535	145	.271	32	108
RF	Willie Crawford	139	468	138	.295	11	61

==== Other batters ====
Note: G = Games played; AB = At bats; H = Hits; Avg. = Batting average; HR = Home runs; RBI = Runs batted in

Player	G	AB	H	Avg.	HR	RBI
Joe Ferguson	111	349	88	.252	16	57
Tom Paciorek	85	175	42	.240	1	24
Von Joshua	81	124	29	.234	1	16
Lee Lacy	48	78	22	.282	0	8
Rick Auerbach	45	73	25	.342	1	4
Ken McMullen	44	60	15	.250	3	12
Manny Mota	66	57	16	.281	0	16
Gail Hopkins	15	18	4	.222	0	0
John Hale	4	4	4	1.000	0	2
Charlie Manuel	4	3	1	.333	0	1
Ivan DeJesus	3	3	1	.333	0	0
Orlando Alvarez	2	1	0	.000	0	0
Jerry Royster	6	0	0	----	0	0
Kevin Pasley	1	0	0	----	0	0

=== Pitching ===
==== Starting pitchers ====
Note: G = Games pitched; IP = Innings pitched; W = Wins; L = Losses; ERA = Earned run average; SO = Strikeouts

Player	G	IP	W	L	ERA	SO
Andy Messersmith	39	292.1	20	6	2.59	221
Don Sutton	40	276.0	19	9	3.23	179
Doug Rau	36	198.1	13	11	3.72	126
Tommy John	22	153.0	13	3	2.59	78

==== Other pitchers ====
Note: G = Games pitched; IP = Innings pitched; W = Wins; L = Losses; ERA = Earned run average; SO = Strikeouts

Player	G	IP	W	L	ERA	SO
Al Downing	21	98.1	5	6	3.66	63
Geoff Zahn	21	79.2	3	5	2.03	33

==== Relief pitchers ====
Note: G = Games pitched; W = Wins; L = Losses; SV = Saves; ERA = Earned run average; SO = Strikeouts

Player	G	W	L	SV	ERA	SO
Mike Marshall	106	15	12	21	2.42	143
Charlie Hough	49	9	4	1	3.75	63
Jim Brewer	24	4	4	0	2.52	26
Rick Rhoden	4	1	0	0	2.00	7
Eddie Solomon	4	0	0	1	1.50	2
Greg Shanahan	4	0	0	0	3.86	2
Rex Hudson	1	0	0	0	22.50	0

== Postseason ==
=== 1974 National League Championship Series ===
The Dodgers beat the Pittsburgh Pirates in four games in the NLCS.

==== Game One ====
October 5, Three Rivers Stadium

Team	1	2	3	4	5	6	7	8	9	R	H	E
Los Angeles	0	1	0	0	0	0	0	0	2	3	9	2
Pittsburgh	0	0	0	0	0	0	0	0	0	0	4	0
W: Don Sutton (1–0) L: Jerry Reuss (0–1)
HR: None

==== Game Two ====
October 6, Three Rivers Stadium

Team	1	2	3	4	5	6	7	8	9	R	H	E
Los Angeles	1	0	0	1	0	0	0	3	0	5	12	0
Pittsburgh	0	0	0	0	0	0	2	0	0	2	8	3
W: Andy Messersmith (1–0) L: Dave Giusti (0–1)
HRs: LAD – Ron Cey (1)

==== Game Three ====
October 8, Dodger Stadium

Team	1	2	3	4	5	6	7	8	9	R	H	E
Pittsburgh	5	0	2	0	0	0	0	0	0	7	10	0
Los Angeles	0	0	0	0	0	0	0	0	0	0	4	5
W: Bruce Kison (1–0) L: Doug Rau (0–1)
HRs: PIT – Willie Stargell (1), Richie Hebner (1)

==== Game Four ====
October 9, Dodger Stadium

Team	1	2	3	4	5	6	7	8	9	R	H	E
Pittsburgh	0	0	0	0	0	0	1	0	0	1	3	1
Los Angeles	1	0	2	0	2	2	2	3	X	12	12	0
W: Don Sutton (2–0) L: Jerry Reuss (0–2)
HRs: LAD – Steve Garvey (2); PIT – Willie Stargell (2)

=== 1974 World Series ===
The Dodgers were defeated by the Oakland Athletics in five games in the World Series.

AL Oakland Athletics (4) vs. NL Los Angeles Dodgers (1)

Game	Score	Date	Location	Attendance	Time of Game
1	Athletics – 3, Dodgers – 2	October 12	Dodger Stadium	55,974	2:43
2	Athletics – 2, Dodgers – 3	October 13	Dodger Stadium	55,989	2:40
3	Dodgers – 2, Athletics – 3	October 15	Oakland-Alameda County Coliseum	49,347	2:35
4	Dodgers – 2, Athletics – 5	October 16	Oakland-Alameda County Coliseum	49,347	2:17
5	Dodgers – 2, Athletics – 3	October 17	Oakland-Alameda County Coliseum	49,347	2:23

== Awards and honors ==
- National League Most Valuable Player
  - Steve Garvey
- Cy Young Award
  - Mike Marshall
- Gold Glove Award
  - Andy Messersmith
  - Steve Garvey
- Comeback Player of the Year Award
  - Jimmy Wynn
- NL Player of the Month
  - Tommy John (April 1974)
- NL Player of the Week
  - Tommy John (Apr. 22–28)
  - Jimmy Wynn (May 6–12)
  - Mike Marshall (June 17–23)
  - Davey Lopes (Aug. 19–25)
  - Ron Cey (Sep. 16–22)

=== All-Stars ===
- 1974 Major League Baseball All-Star Game
  - Andy Messersmith starter
  - Steve Garvey starter
  - Ron Cey starter
  - Jimmy Wynn starter
  - Mike Marshall reserve
- Major League Baseball All-Star Game MVP Award
  - Steve Garvey

=== Sporting News awards ===
- TSN Pitcher of the Year Award
  - Mike Marshall
- TSN Fireman of the Year Award
  - Mike Marshall
- TSN National League All-Star
  - Jimmy Wynn
  - Andy Messersmith
  - Steve Garvey

== Farm system ==
Level	Team	League	Manager
AAA	Albuquerque Dukes	Pacific Coast League	Stan Wasiak
AA	Waterbury Dodgers	Eastern League	Don LeJohn
A	Bakersfield Dodgers	California League	George Freese
A	Orangeburg Dodgers	Western Carolinas League	Bart Shirley
Rookie	Bellingham Dodgers	Northwest League	Bill Berrier

== 1974 Major League Baseball draft ==
This was the tenth year of a Major League Baseball draft. The Dodgers drafted 23 players in the June draft and six in the January draft. Four players from this class played in MLB.

The top pick was pitcher Rick Sutcliffe from Van Horn High School in Independence, Missouri. Sutcliffe would go on to win the 1979 Rookie of the Year Award. The Dodgers traded him to the Cleveland Indians in 1982 but he would remain in the league through 1994. He accumulated a record of 171–139, was a three-time All-Star and won the 1984 National League Cy Young Award, while with the Chicago Cubs.

They also drafted infielder Jim Riggleman in the fourth round. While he never made the Majors as a player, he had a stint as the Dodgers Major League Bench coach and would become a successful Major League Manager with four different clubs.

1974 draft picks

=== January draft ===
Round	Name	Position	School	Signed	Career span	Highest level
1	Claude Westmoreland	OF	University of California, Berkeley	Yes	1974–1982	AAA
2	Dale Forchetti	SS	University of Southern Mississippi	No		
3	Hank Boguszewski	RHP	Nassau Community College	No		
4	Shane Rawley	LHP	Indian Hills Community College	No; Expos-1974	1974–1989	MLB

==== January secondary phase ====
Round	Name	Position	School	Signed	Career span	Highest level
1	Donald Cardoza	OF	College of the Sequoias	Yes	1974–1978	AAA
2	Jim Dorsey	RHP	Los Angeles Valley College	No; Angels-1975	1975–1985	MLB

=== June draft ===
Round	Name	Position	School	Signed	Career span	Highest level
1	Rick Sutcliffe	RHP	Van Horn High School	Yes	1974–1994	MLB
2	Steve Shirley	LHP	Terra Nova High School	Yes	1974–1988	MLB
3	Freddie Tisdale	SS	Centennial High School	Yes	1974–1983	AAA
4	Jim Riggleman	2B	Frostburg State University	Yes	1974–1981	AAA
5	Alvin Harper	SS	Southern University and A&M College	Yes	1974	A
6	James Del Vecchio	2B	Andrew Ward High School	Yes	1974–1979	AAA
7	Chris Gandy	OF	Christian Brothers High School	No; Dodgers-1978	1978–1980	A
8	Randy Rogers	SS	Texas High School	Yes	1974–1981	AAA
9	Joseph Keller	RHP	Clover Park High School	Yes	1974–1976	A
10	Charles Ollar	OF	Oklahoma State University	Yes	1974–1980	AAA
11	Scott Anderson	RHP	Lake Oswego High School	No; Expos-1977	1977–1982	AA
12	Dwayne Wright	C	Berkeley High School	No; Blue Jays-1977	1977–1978	A
13	Les Pearsey	SS	Brethren High School	No; Twins-1978	1978–1982	AAA
14	Jackie Schuman	2B	Putnam City High School	No		
15	Richard Oliveri	3B	Bishop Fallon High School	Yes	1974–1978	A-
16	Billy Wilson	RHP	Emporia State University	Yes	1974–1978	AAA
17	Michael Laurent	RHP	University of New Mexico	Yes	1974–1975	A
18	Ramon Murillo	RHP	Agua Fria High School	No; White Sox-1978	1978–1982	AAA
19	Brian Heublein	LHP	University of Southern California	No		
20	Chris Lynch	RHP	Miami Dade College	No		
21	Ronald Wrobel	LHP	Archbishop Quigley Preparatory Seminary	No; Indians-1978	1978–1980	A
22	Doug Slocum	RHP	Arizona State University	Yes	1974–1978	AA

==== June secondary phase ====
Round	Name	Position	School	Signed	Career span	Highest level
1	Robert Glass	3B	State College of Florida, Manatee–Sarasota	Yes	1974–1979	AAA
