= 1974 National League Championship Series =

6th edition of Major League Baseball's National League Championship Series

| Team (Wins) | Managers | Season |
|---|---|---|
| Los Angeles Dodgers (3) | Walter Alston | 102–60, .630, GA: 4 |
| Pittsburgh Pirates (1) | Danny Murtaugh | 88–74, .543, GA: 1½ |
- Dates: October 5–9
- Umpires: Nick Colosi; Paul Pryor; Lee Weyer; John McSherry; Shag Crawford (crew chief); Satch Davidson

Broadcast
- Television: NBC; KTTV (LAD); KDKA-TV (PIT)
- TV announcers: NBC: Jim Simpson and Maury Wills (Game 1); Curt Gowdy and Tony Kubek (in Los Angeles); NBC did not televise Game 2 due to conflicts with its NFL coverage. KTTV: Vin Scully and Jerry Doggett; KDKA-TV: Bob Prince and Nellie King

The 1974 National League Championship Series was a best-of-five series in Major League Baseball’s 1974 postseason that matched the East Division champion Pittsburgh Pirates against the West Division champion Los Angeles Dodgers. It was the sixth NLCS in all. The Dodgers won the Series three games to one to advance to the 1974 World Series, which they lost to the Oakland Athletics.

== Summary ==
=== Los Angeles Dodgers vs. Pittsburgh Pirates ===
Los Angeles won the series, 3–1.

| Game | Date | Score | Location | Time | Attendance |
|---|---|---|---|---|---|
| 1 | October 5 | Los Angeles Dodgers – 3, Pittsburgh Pirates – 0 | Three Rivers Stadium | 2:25 | 40,638 |
| 2 | October 6 | Los Angeles Dodgers – 5, Pittsburgh Pirates – 2 | Three Rivers Stadium | 2:44 | 49,247 |
| 3 | October 8 | Pittsburgh Pirates – 7, Los Angeles Dodgers – 0 | Dodger Stadium | 2:41 | 55,953 |
| 4 | October 9 | Pittsburgh Pirates – 1, Los Angeles Dodgers – 12 | Dodger Stadium | 2:36 | 54,424 |

== Game summaries ==
=== Game 1 ===
October 5, 1974 1:00 pm (ET) at Three Rivers Stadium in Pittsburgh, Pennsylvania
| Team | 1 | 2 | 3 | 4 | 5 | 6 | 7 | 8 | 9 | R | H | E |
|---|---|---|---|---|---|---|---|---|---|---|---|---|
| Los Angeles | 0 | 1 | 0 | 0 | 0 | 0 | 0 | 0 | 2 | 3 | 9 | 2 |
| Pittsburgh | 0 | 0 | 0 | 0 | 0 | 0 | 0 | 0 | 0 | 0 | 4 | 0 |
WP: Don Sutton (1–0) LP: Jerry Reuss (0–1)

The Dodgers had been winless in six games played at Pittsburgh during the regular season but they remedied that situation in postseason play. In the opening game, Don Sutton of the Dodgers was opposed by Jerry Reuss. The Pirate lefty yielded just one run in seven innings (on a bases-loaded walk to Davey Lopes in the second), but left the game in favor of an ineffectual pinch-hitter. Dave Giusti came on in the eighth inning and gave up two insurance runs in the ninth on Jim Wynn's RBI double with one on, followed by Joe Ferguson's RBI single. Meanwhile, Sutton set the Pittsburgh club down on four hits and no runs.

=== Game 2 ===
October 6, 1974 1:00 pm (ET) at Three Rivers Stadium in Pittsburgh, Pennsylvania
| Team | 1 | 2 | 3 | 4 | 5 | 6 | 7 | 8 | 9 | R | H | E |
|---|---|---|---|---|---|---|---|---|---|---|---|---|
| Los Angeles | 1 | 0 | 0 | 1 | 0 | 0 | 0 | 3 | 0 | 5 | 12 | 0 |
| Pittsburgh | 0 | 0 | 0 | 0 | 0 | 0 | 2 | 0 | 0 | 2 | 8 | 3 |
WP: Andy Messersmith (1–0) LP: Dave Giusti (0–1); Home runs: LAD: Ron Cey (1); PIT: None

The Dodgers struck first in Game 2 on Steve Garvey's RBI single in the first with two on off Jim Rooker. Ron Cey's leadoff home run in the fourth extended their lead to 2–0. The Pittsburgh string of scoreless innings was extended to 15 before the Pirates finally got on the board in the seventh inning off Andy Messersmith. After two leadoff singles and sacrifice bunt, one run came in on a Richie Hebner groundout and the other on an Al Oliver high bouncer that escaped third baseman Cey's glove and was scored a single. With the game tied going into the eighth inning, it was a battle between ace relievers Mike Marshall, of Los Angeles, and Dave Giusti. Giusti could not retire even one batter. After a leadoff double and subsequent single, back-to-back RBI singles by Willie Crawford and Manny Mota aided by an error by catcher Manny Sanguillén put the Dodgers back in front 4–2. Davey Lopes's RBI single off Larry Demery extended their lead to 5–2 while Marshall retired six straight batters in the last two innings to give the Dodgers a 2–0 series lead heading to Los Angeles.

=== Game 3 ===
October 8, 1974 12:30 pm (PT) at Dodger Stadium in Los Angeles, California
| Team | 1 | 2 | 3 | 4 | 5 | 6 | 7 | 8 | 9 | R | H | E |
|---|---|---|---|---|---|---|---|---|---|---|---|---|
| Pittsburgh | 5 | 0 | 2 | 0 | 0 | 0 | 0 | 0 | 0 | 7 | 10 | 0 |
| Los Angeles | 0 | 0 | 0 | 0 | 0 | 0 | 0 | 0 | 0 | 0 | 4 | 5 |
WP: Bruce Kison (1–0) LP: Doug Rau (0–1); Home runs: PIT: Willie Stargell (1), Richie Hebner (1); LAD: None

A record crowd for Dodger Stadium (55,953) showed up for Game 3 with the home team one win away from the World Series, but the Pirates hammered starter Doug Rau in the top of the first. After a leadoff single and one-out walk, Willie Stargell's three-run home run put the Pirates up 3–0. One out later, an error, the first of five the Dodgers committed in the game, allowed Bob Robertson to reach base before Richie Hebner's two-run home run extended the lead to 5–0. In the fourth, back-to-back two-out RBI singles by Hebner and Mario Mendoza with two on off Charlie Hough made it 7–0 Pirates. Bruce Kison gave up only two hits in the 6 2/3 innings he worked and his reliever Ramón Hernández, slammed the door on the Dodgers the rest of the way as the Pirates staved off elimination.

=== Game 4 ===
October 9, 1974 12:30 pm (PT) at Dodger Stadium in Los Angeles, California
| Team | 1 | 2 | 3 | 4 | 5 | 6 | 7 | 8 | 9 | R | H | E |
|---|---|---|---|---|---|---|---|---|---|---|---|---|
| Pittsburgh | 0 | 0 | 0 | 0 | 0 | 0 | 1 | 0 | 0 | 1 | 3 | 1 |
| Los Angeles | 1 | 0 | 2 | 0 | 2 | 2 | 2 | 3 | X | 12 | 12 | 0 |
WP: Don Sutton (2–0) LP: Jerry Reuss (0–2); Home runs: PIT: Willie Stargell (2); LAD: Steve Garvey 2 (2)

Don Sutton and Jerry Reuss, as in the opener, were the opposing pitchers in the fourth game. Sutton was just as good as he ever was, permitting but one run (on Willie Stargell's home run in the seventh) and three hits and striking out seven in eight innings of work before allowing the ubiquitous Mike Marshall to close.

Reuss and three relievers, on the other hand, were hammered. Davey Lopes walked to lead off the first, stole second and scored on Jim Wynn's double. In the third, Steve Garvey's home run after a walk made it 3–0. In the fifth, Garvey's second home run of the game, also after a walk off Ken Brett, extended the lead to 5–0. Next inning, Steve Yeager drew a leadoff walk off Larry Demery, moved to second on a sacrifice bunt and scored on a triple by Davey Lopes, who himself scored on second baseman Rennie Stennett's errant throw to third. Next inning, after a leadoff single and walk, Dave Giusti relieved Demery and allowed RBI singles to Bill Russell and Don Sutton to extend the Dodgers' lead to 9–1. In the eighth, Giusti allowed a one-out single and walk before Joe Ferguson's RBI single made it 10–1 Dodgers. After an intentional walk loaded the bases, Russell's two-run single capped the game's scoring at 12–1 as the Dodgers advanced to the 1974 World Series with the largest margin of victory in a championship series game at that time. It would eventually be broken in Game 3 of the 2020 NLCS, where the Dodgers won by a twelve run margin of victory.

== Composite box ==
1974 NLCS (3–1): Los Angeles Dodgers over Pittsburgh Pirates

| Team | 1 | 2 | 3 | 4 | 5 | 6 | 7 | 8 | 9 | R | H | E |
|---|---|---|---|---|---|---|---|---|---|---|---|---|
| Los Angeles Dodgers | 2 | 1 | 2 | 1 | 2 | 2 | 2 | 6 | 2 | 20 | 37 | 7 |
| Pittsburgh Pirates | 5 | 0 | 2 | 0 | 0 | 0 | 3 | 0 | 0 | 10 | 25 | 4 |
Total attendance: 200,262 Average attendance: 50,066
