= 1974 American League Championship Series =

6th edition of Major League Baseball's American League Championship Series

Team (Wins)	Managers	Season
Oakland Athletics (3)	Alvin Dark	90–72 (.556), GA: 5
Baltimore Orioles (1)	Earl Weaver	91–71 (.562), GA: 2
- Dates: October 5–9
- Umpires: Larry Napp; Jerry Neudecker; Russ Goetz; Dave Phillips; Marty Springstead (crew chief); Bill Deegan

Broadcast
- Television: NBC; KPIX (OAK); WJZ-TV (BAL)
- TV announcers: NBC: Curt Gowdy, Tony Kubek, and Frank Robinson (in Oakland); Jim Simpson and Maury Wills (in Baltimore); KPIX: Monte Moore and Jon Miller; WJZ-TV: Chuck Thompson and Bill O'Donnell

The 1974 American League Championship Series was a best-of-five matchup in Major League Baseball's 1974 postseason between the East Division Champion Baltimore Orioles and the West Division Champion Oakland Athletics. It was a rematch of the previous year's series and third meeting between the two teams in four seasons.

The A's beat the Orioles three games to one to win their third straight pennant, then defeated the Los Angeles Dodgers in the World Series for their third consecutive championship.

== Summary ==
=== Baltimore Orioles vs. Oakland Athletics ===
Oakland won the series, 3–1.

Game	Date	Score	Location	Time	Attendance
1	October 5	Baltimore Orioles – 6, Oakland A's – 3	Oakland-Alameda County Coliseum	2:29	41,609
2	October 6	Baltimore Orioles – 0, Oakland A's – 5	Oakland-Alameda County Coliseum	2:28	42,810
3	October 8	Oakland A's – 1, Baltimore Orioles – 0	Memorial Stadium	1:57	32,060
4	October 9	Oakland A's – 2, Baltimore Orioles – 1	Memorial Stadium	2:46	28,136

== Game summaries ==
=== Game 1 ===
October 5, 1974 1:00 pm (PDT) at Oakland-Alameda County Coliseum in Oakland, California
Team	1	2	3	4	5	6	7	8	9	R	H	E
Baltimore	1	0	0	1	4	0	0	0	0	6	10	0
Oakland	0	0	1	0	1	0	0	0	1	3	9	0
WP: Mike Cuellar (1–0) LP: Catfish Hunter (0–1); Home runs: BAL: Paul Blair (1), Brooks Robinson (1), Bobby Grich (1); OAK: None

The Birds jumped all over the ace of the Oakland staff, Catfish Hunter, pounding him for six runs and eight hits, including three homers in less than five innings. Hunter had a skein of seven straight decisions over the Birds going into the game. Southpaw Mike Cuellar pitched steady ball for the winners and got the decision with relief help in the ninth inning from Ross Grimsley.

A portent of things to happen came in the first inning when Paul Blair, second man in the batting order, hit a Hunter pitch for a home run. Bert Campaneris' single that followed a fielder's choice and a stolen base by Bill North gave the A's a temporary tie in the third inning. But a double by Bobby Grich and Tommy Davis' single put the Orioles ahead to stay in the fourth. A four-run outburst in the fifth, featuring homers by Brooks Robinson and Bobby Grich, locked up the game and sent Hunter to the showers.

When Cuellar yielded a single to Jesús Alou and a double to Claudell Washington, both pinch-hitters, to open the last of the ninth, he was pulled in favor of Grimsley, who got the last three outs without trouble.

=== Game 2 ===
October 6, 1974 1:00 pm (PDT) at Oakland-Alameda County Coliseum in Oakland, California
Team	1	2	3	4	5	6	7	8	9	R	H	E
Baltimore	0	0	0	0	0	0	0	0	0	0	5	2
Oakland	0	0	0	1	0	1	0	3	X	5	8	0
WP: Ken Holtzman (1–0) LP: Dave McNally (0–1); Home runs: BAL: None; OAK: Sal Bando (1), Ray Fosse (1)

The A's assumed command the next day when Ken Holtzman permitted the Orioles only five hits en route to a 5–0 triumph. The Oakland club got an unearned run in the fourth when Bobby Grich dropped a foul pop by Sal Bando for an error. Two pitches later, Bando drove a Dave McNally pitch over the left-field fence for a homer. Joe Rudi tripled home North in the sixth for the second run. In the eighth inning, with two men on—the result of a walk and an error—Ray Fosse hit a home run off reliever Grant Jackson to put the game on ice.

=== Game 3 ===
October 8, 1974 2:00 pm (EDT) at Memorial Stadium in Baltimore, Maryland
Team	1	2	3	4	5	6	7	8	9	R	H	E
Oakland	0	0	0	1	0	0	0	0	0	1	4	2
Baltimore	0	0	0	0	0	0	0	0	0	0	2	1
WP: Vida Blue (1–0) LP: Jim Palmer (0–1); Home runs: OAK: Sal Bando (2); BAL: None

In a great complete-game pitching battle between Vida Blue and Jim Palmer, Blue hurled a two-hitter and Palmer a four-hitter. But one of the four safe blows yielded by the Oriole right-hander was a home run by Sal Bando in the fourth inning, the only run of the game.

=== Game 4 ===
October 9, 1974 2:00 pm (EDT) at Memorial Stadium in Baltimore, Maryland
Team	1	2	3	4	5	6	7	8	9	R	H	E
Oakland	0	0	0	0	1	0	1	0	0	2	1	0
Baltimore	0	0	0	0	0	0	0	0	1	1	5	1
WP: Catfish Hunter (1–1) LP: Mike Cuellar (1–1) Sv: Rollie Fingers (1)

The fourth game belonged to the A's, although their offense was able to produce only one safe hit for the afternoon. Cuellar pitched a no-hitter for 4 2/3 innings, but walked four consecutive batters to give Oakland a run. During his stint on the mound, the Oriole lefty walked no less than nine batters and was removed while yet to give up a hit.

The run that was to prove decisive came in the seventh off reliever Ross Grimsley. Sal Bando walked and Reggie Jackson stroked a double off the left-field wall to plate Bando. The Orioles almost pulled the game out of the bag in their last turn at bat. With one out and Rollie Fingers pitching in relief of Hunter, Paul Blair walked and Bobby Grich singled. A force play provided the second out of the inning but Boog Powell's single drove in one run, finally ending a thirty-inning scoreless streak. Fingers, however, was equal to the occasion and fanned Don Baylor on a fast ball to clinch another league crown for Oakland.

Pitching dominated the four-game set, the A's batted a meager .183, but the Orioles were even lower at a paltry .177. After Game 1, superior Oakland pitching held Baltimore to just one run and twelve hits over the next three games, hitting a very weak .135 (12 for 89), with no extra-base hits. With the win, the A's became the second (and, as of 2026, most recent) MLB team to win a playoff game while being held to just one hit. The first was the Brooklyn Dodgers in Game 4 of the 1947 World Series.

== Composite box ==
1974 ALCS (3–1): Oakland A's over Baltimore Orioles

Team	1	2	3	4	5	6	7	8	9	R	H	E
Oakland A's	0	0	1	2	2	1	1	3	1	11	22	2
Baltimore Orioles	1	0	0	1	4	0	0	0	1	7	22	4
Total attendance: 144,615 Average attendance: 36,154
