= 1974 World Series =

1974 Major League Baseball championship series

| Team (Wins) | Managers | Season |
|---|---|---|
| Oakland Athletics (4) | Alvin Dark | 90–72, .556, GA: 5 |
| Los Angeles Dodgers (1) | Walter Alston | 102–60, .630, GA: 4 |
- Dates: October 12–17
- Venue(s): Dodger Stadium (Los Angeles); Oakland–Alameda County Coliseum (Oakland)
- MVP: Rollie Fingers (Oakland)
- Umpires: Tom Gorman (NL), Don Denkinger (AL), Doug Harvey (NL), Bill Kunkel (AL), Andy Olsen (NL), Ron Luciano (AL)
- Hall of Famers: Umpire: Doug Harvey; Athletics: Rollie Fingers; Catfish Hunter; Reggie Jackson; Dodgers: Walter Alston (manager); Don Sutton; Tommy Lasorda (3rd base coach)

Broadcast
- Television: NBC
- TV announcers: Curt Gowdy; Vin Scully (in Los Angeles); Monte Moore (in Oakland); Tony Kubek
- Radio: NBC
- Radio announcers: Jim Simpson; Monte Moore (in Los Angeles); Vin Scully (in Oakland)
- ALCS: Oakland Athletics over Baltimore Orioles (3–1)
- NLCS: Los Angeles Dodgers over Pittsburgh Pirates (3–1)

The 1974 World Series was the championship series of Major League Baseball's (MLB) 1974 season. The 71st edition of the World Series, it was a best-of-seven playoff played between the American League (AL) champion (and two-time defending World Series champion) Oakland Athletics and the National League (NL) champion Los Angeles Dodgers in the first all-California World Series. The Athletics defeated the Dodgers in five games to win their eighth championship in franchise history, becoming just the second team in MLB history to three-peat as World Series champions, joining the New York Yankees. As of 2026, this is the last time the Athletics won the World Series at home.

Rollie Fingers pitched in three of the four Oakland victories, posting a win and two saves, and was honored with the World Series Most Valuable Player Award. Oakland became the first team to win three consecutive Series since the New York Yankees won five straight (1949–1953); the win secured the Athletics' status as one of the truly dominant teams of the 1970s. (The other "team of the decade," the Cincinnati Reds, won consecutive World Series in 1975 and 1976, after falling short in 1970 and 1972.) Since 1974, only the Yankees have won three consecutive titles, having done so in 1998, '99, and 2000.

This was the first all-California World Series, the first World Series since 1956 to feature two teams from the same state, and the first with an official World Series logo; these two teams met again fourteen years later, but with a different result with the underdog Dodgers defeating the heavily favored Athletics in five games.

== Background ==
The 1974 Los Angeles Dodgers were the second (after the runner-up 1962 squad) Dodgers team to win at least 100 games since moving west from Brooklyn; they won the National League West division after a season long battle by four games over the Cincinnati Reds, then defeated the Pittsburgh Pirates three games to one in the National League Championship Series. The Oakland Athletics won the American League West division by five games over the Texas Rangers, then defeated the Baltimore Orioles three games to one in the American League Championship Series.

=== Oakland Athletics ===
The Oakland Athletics, at the height of their dynasty as the "Swingin' A's", had consistently matched their on-field heroics with locker-room meltdowns and intra-squad theatrics for the American League. After yet another banner year (Catfish Hunter won 25 games, Reggie Jackson knocked in 105 runs, and Billy North stole 54 bases), the team seemed to be winning more attention for its dysfunctional communication patterns than for its superior lineup. Hunter was threatening to file for free agency in 1975 if owner Charles O. Finley didn't come through with back pay Hunter claimed he had coming. Traumatized former second baseman Mike Andrews was considering legal action for the shabby treatment he received in the previous year's World Series. Teammates Rollie Fingers and Blue Moon Odom had gotten into a fistfight. And the Series-winning manager of the previous year, Dick Williams was long gone, having had one personality clash too many with the Athletics front office. Despite all the melodrama, the Athletics won the pennant for the third straight year, the first time a team had done so since the 1960-64 New York Yankees. They had dispatched the Baltimore Orioles in a four-game ALCS. Notwithstanding the off-field troubles, between the lines they were fundamentally sound, had strong pitching, and combined speed and power.

=== Los Angeles Dodgers ===
Los Angeles won 102 games, boasted the best team ERA (2.97) in the National League, and led their league in runs scored (798). Steve Garvey hit .312, Jimmy Wynn knocked in 108 runs, Bill Buckner hit .314 in one of the best years of his career, Davey Lopes stole 59 bases, Andy Messersmith won twenty games, and Don Sutton won nineteen games. Walter Alston was in his 21st year as manager of the club.

== Summary ==
AL Oakland Athletics (4) vs. NL Los Angeles Dodgers (1)

| Game | Date | Score | Location | Time | Attendance |
|---|---|---|---|---|---|
| 1 | October 12 | Oakland Athletics – 3, Los Angeles Dodgers – 2 | Dodger Stadium | 2:43 | 55,974 |
| 2 | October 13 | Oakland Athletics – 2, Los Angeles Dodgers – 3 | Dodger Stadium | 2:40 | 55,989 |
| 3 | October 15 | Los Angeles Dodgers – 2, Oakland Athletics – 3 | Oakland–Alameda County Coliseum | 2:35 | 49,347 |
| 4 | October 16 | Los Angeles Dodgers – 2, Oakland Athletics – 5 | Oakland–Alameda County Coliseum | 2:17 | 49,347 |
| 5 | October 17 | Los Angeles Dodgers – 2, Oakland Athletics – 3 | Oakland–Alameda County Coliseum | 2:23 | 49,347 |

== Matchups ==
=== Game 1 ===
October 12, 1974 1:00 pm (PT) at Dodger Stadium in Los Angeles, California 71 °F (22 °C), sunny
| Team | 1 | 2 | 3 | 4 | 5 | 6 | 7 | 8 | 9 | R | H | E |
|---|---|---|---|---|---|---|---|---|---|---|---|---|
| Oakland | 0 | 1 | 0 | 0 | 1 | 0 | 0 | 1 | 0 | 3 | 6 | 2 |
| Los Angeles | 0 | 0 | 0 | 0 | 1 | 0 | 0 | 0 | 1 | 2 | 11 | 1 |
WP: Rollie Fingers (1–0) LP: Andy Messersmith (0–1) Sv: Catfish Hunter (1); Home runs: OAK: Reggie Jackson (1); LAD: Jimmy Wynn (1)

Reggie Jackson put the A's on the board first with a homer in the top of the second off 20-game winner Andy Messersmith. The A's added another run in the fifth when starting pitcher Ken Holtzman, batting for the first time all season because of the designated hitter rule, doubled to left, went to third on a Messersmith wild pitch, and scored on a Bert Campaneris suicide squeeze bunt.

The Dodgers crept back with a run in their half of the fifth when Davey Lopes reached first on an error by Campaneris. Bill Buckner then bounced a single to right that Jackson misplayed, allowing Lopes to score.

The A's scored their final run in the eighth when Campaneris singled to shallow center, was sacrificed to second by Bill North, and scored when Dodger third baseman Ron Cey threw wildly to first on a grounder hit by Sal Bando. Bando reached third on the error, and attempted to score on a flyout to right by Jackson, but right fielder Joe Ferguson gunned him down at the plate.

In the bottom of the ninth, with Rollie Fingers on the mound, Jimmy Wynn hit a homer that just escaped the reach of Joe Rudi and North in left center. Following a single by Steve Garvey, Catfish Hunter relieved Fingers and made the final out, striking out Ferguson. Fingers got the win with 4 1/3 innings of relief, having relieved Holtzman in the fifth inning.

=== Game 2 ===
Joe Ferguson hit a two-run home run to help Los Angeles win their only game of the Series

October 13, 1974 1:00 pm (PT) at Dodger Stadium in Los Angeles, California 70 °F (21 °C), sunny
| Team | 1 | 2 | 3 | 4 | 5 | 6 | 7 | 8 | 9 | R | H | E |
|---|---|---|---|---|---|---|---|---|---|---|---|---|
| Oakland | 0 | 0 | 0 | 0 | 0 | 0 | 0 | 0 | 2 | 2 | 6 | 0 |
| Los Angeles | 0 | 1 | 0 | 0 | 0 | 2 | 0 | 0 | X | 3 | 6 | 1 |
WP: Don Sutton (1–0) LP: Vida Blue (0–1) Sv: Mike Marshall (1); Home runs: OAK: None; LAD: Joe Ferguson (1)

Don Sutton pitched superbly, shutting out the A's on four hits through eight innings. The Dodgers scored first in the second off Vida Blue when Ron Cey walked, Bill Russell singled, and Steve Yeager singled home Cey. Joe Ferguson slammed a two-run homer off Blue in the sixth inning to make it 3–0.

The A's threatened in the eighth when pinch hitters Jim Holt and Claudell Washington hit back-to-back singles with one out. Bert Campaneris reached on an infield error to load the bases. The rally was squelched when Bill North hit into a double play in which first baseman Steve Garvey made an exceptional pickup of a low throw by Russell.

In the ninth inning the A's finally got on the board when Sal Bando led off with being hit by a pitch, Reggie Jackson followed with a double, and Joe Rudi singled both runners home. Mike Marshall then relieved Sutton and struck out Gene Tenace. Herb Washington was sent in to pinch-run for Rudi, and Marshall picked him off. Herb Washington was the only "designated runner" to appear in a World Series. Washington was a track star with no baseball experience whom the A's Charles Finley signed solely to appear as a pinch runner in late game situations. His stats for 1974 were 92 games, zero at bats, 29 runs scored, 29 stolen bases, but he was caught stealing 16 times. Sure enough, with the A's trailing 3–2 in the ninth inning of Game 2, Washington pinch ran. Just after announcer Vin Scully said that Washington better be careful because pitcher Mike Marshall has a good pickoff move, he was promptly picked off first base. Marshall then retired Ángel Mangual for the final out.

=== Game 3 ===
October 15, 1974 5:30 pm (PT) at Oakland–Alameda County Coliseum in Oakland, California 78 °F (26 °C), clear
| Team | 1 | 2 | 3 | 4 | 5 | 6 | 7 | 8 | 9 | R | H | E |
|---|---|---|---|---|---|---|---|---|---|---|---|---|
| Los Angeles | 0 | 0 | 0 | 0 | 0 | 0 | 0 | 1 | 1 | 2 | 7 | 2 |
| Oakland | 0 | 0 | 2 | 1 | 0 | 0 | 0 | 0 | X | 3 | 5 | 2 |
WP: Catfish Hunter (1–0) LP: Al Downing (0–1); Home runs: LAD: Bill Buckner (1), Willie Crawford (1); OAK: None

With the Series shifting back to Oakland, it was A's ace Catfish Hunter's turn to be brilliant. Hunter shut out the Dodgers on four hits through seven innings, and his teammates scored two runs in the third when Bill North scored on an error by catcher Joe Ferguson and an RBI single by Joe Rudi. The A's added another run in the fourth on Bert Campaneris' RBI single.

The Dodgers got their only runs on homers by Bill Buckner in the eighth and Willie Crawford in the ninth.

Rollie Fingers was not awarded the save because in 1974, tougher criteria were adopted for saves where the tying run had to be on base or at the plate when the reliever entered to qualify for a save.

=== Game 4 ===
October 16, 1974 5:30 pm (PT) at Oakland–Alameda County Coliseum in Oakland, California 83 °F (28 °C), mostly cloudy
| Team | 1 | 2 | 3 | 4 | 5 | 6 | 7 | 8 | 9 | R | H | E |
|---|---|---|---|---|---|---|---|---|---|---|---|---|
| Los Angeles | 0 | 0 | 0 | 2 | 0 | 0 | 0 | 0 | 0 | 2 | 7 | 1 |
| Oakland | 0 | 0 | 1 | 0 | 0 | 4 | 0 | 0 | X | 5 | 7 | 0 |
WP: Ken Holtzman (1–0) LP: Andy Messersmith (0–2) Sv: Rollie Fingers (1); Home runs: LAD: None; OAK: Ken Holtzman (1)

The A's struck first on a solo homer by the surprising Ken Holtzman in the third. The Dodgers came right back in their half of the fourth on a two-run triple by Bill Russell. Holtzman settled into a groove after that, surrendering no runs before yielding to Rollie Fingers in the eighth.

The A's took control of the game with four runs in the sixth off Andy Messersmith. Bill North led off with a walk and went to second on a wild pickoff throw by Messersmith. Sal Bando singled home North to tie it. After a Reggie Jackson walk, a Joe Rudi sacrifice bunt, and an intentional walk to Claudell Washington, Jim Holt pinch-hit for Ray Fosse and singled in two runs. An RBI groundout by Dick Green capped off the rally. Fingers pitched the final 1 2/3 innings for his first save of the series.

=== Game 5 ===
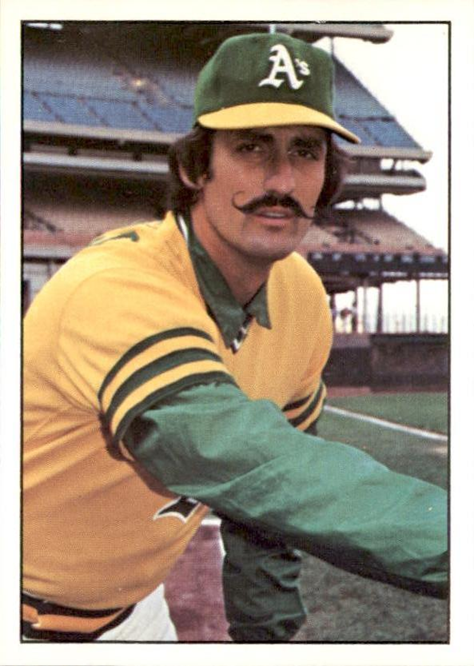
Rollie Fingers got his second save of the Series on his way to winning World Series MVP.

October 17, 1974 5:30 pm (PT) at Oakland–Alameda County Coliseum in Oakland, California 81 °F (27 °C), partly cloudy
| Team | 1 | 2 | 3 | 4 | 5 | 6 | 7 | 8 | 9 | R | H | E |
|---|---|---|---|---|---|---|---|---|---|---|---|---|
| Los Angeles | 0 | 0 | 0 | 0 | 0 | 2 | 0 | 0 | 0 | 2 | 5 | 1 |
| Oakland | 1 | 1 | 0 | 0 | 0 | 0 | 1 | 0 | X | 3 | 6 | 1 |
WP: Blue Moon Odom (1–0) LP: Mike Marshall (0–1) Sv: Rollie Fingers (2); Home runs: LAD: None; OAK: Ray Fosse (1), Joe Rudi (1)

The A's staked Vida Blue to a 2–0 lead with single runs in the first and second innings on a sacrifice fly by Sal Bando and a homer by Ray Fosse. The Dodgers tied it in the sixth with two runs on a sacrifice fly by Jimmy Wynn and an RBI single by Steve Garvey.

Joe Rudi got what would turn out to be the game-winning RBI when he tagged Dodger ace reliever Mike Marshall with a homer in the bottom of the seventh. The half-inning was delayed when Bill Buckner complained of A's fans throwing debris onto the field. Marshall, who always pitched in short sleeves, disdained his allowance of eight warm up pitches after coming in from the bullpen even after the delay. Rudi then proceeded to deposit Marshall's first pitch over the left field wall.

In the Dodgers half of the eighth, Buckner led off with a base hit to center that got past center fielder Bill North. Buckner had an easy double, but tried to stretch it to a triple and Reggie Jackson, backing up North, fired a perfect throw to Dick Green, who relayed to Sal Bando at third to nail Buckner and squelch the last Dodger threat. Rollie Fingers got his second save and was named Series MVP.

== Aftermath ==
Four of the five games had the score of 3–2. Mike Marshall of the Los Angeles Dodgers was the only pitcher to appear in all five games of a five-game World Series, as of 2025.

The Dodgers got six more hits than the A's but scored five fewer runs, showing their lack of timely hitting. They also made six errors in five games, in addition to a number of mental errors.

The champion A's batted only .211 in the Series, the lowest in a five-game Series since the Baltimore Orioles hit .146 and lost in 1969.

As of 2025, the A's are the only team besides the Yankees to win three consecutive World Series.

This was the first World Series to end at night. While it opened with traditional day games (1 pm PDT) on the weekend in Los Angeles, the three weeknight games in Oakland (5:30 pm PDT) were all in prime-time (for the Eastern and Central time zones).

As World Series champions, the A's earned a postseason bonus of $22,219 each; the Dodger shares were $15,704 each, while the Orioles and Pirates took about $7,400 each.

This was the last major league championship for a Bay Area team won in its home stadium or arena until the Golden State Warriors won the 2017 NBA Finals in Oakland, ending a streak of 13 Bay Area championships won in an opponent or neutral stadium or arena. Also, with the Warriors winning the 1975 NBA Finals, Oakland (and the Bay Area in particular) won both the World Series and NBA championship in a span of a season or calendar year, a distinction previously earned by New York when the Mets and Knicks won their league championships within a year's span. This was followed by the Los Angeles metropolitan area in 1981–82 (Dodgers and Lakers), 1988 (Dodgers and Lakers), 2002 (Angels and Lakers) and 2020 (Lakers and Dodgers), Boston in 2007–08 (Red Sox and Celtics), and the San Francisco Bay Area in 2014–15 (Giants and Warriors).

== Composite box ==
1974 World Series (4–1): Oakland Athletics (A.L.) over Los Angeles Dodgers (N.L.)

| Team | 1 | 2 | 3 | 4 | 5 | 6 | 7 | 8 | 9 | R | H | E |
|---|---|---|---|---|---|---|---|---|---|---|---|---|
| Oakland Athletics | 1 | 2 | 3 | 1 | 1 | 4 | 1 | 1 | 2 | 16 | 30 | 5 |
| Los Angeles Dodgers | 0 | 1 | 0 | 2 | 1 | 4 | 0 | 1 | 2 | 11 | 36 | 6 |
Total attendance: 260,004 Average attendance: 52,001; Winning player's share: $22,219 Losing player's share: $15,704

At the time, the run differential of five runs tied for second-lowest for a five-game series (with 1933 and 1942); the 1915 margin was two runs, and three runs in 2000.

== See also ==
- 1974 Japan Series
