= 1974 Oakland Athletics season =

Major League Baseball season

1974 Oakland Athletics
- World Series champions American League champions American League West champions
- League: American League
- Division: West
- Ballpark: Oakland-Alameda County Coliseum
- City: Oakland, California
- Record: 90–72 (.556)
- Divisional place: 1st
- Owners: Charles O. Finley
- Managers: Alvin Dark
- Television: KTVU
- Radio: KEEN (Monte Moore, Jon Miller)

The 1974 Oakland Athletics season was the 74th season for the Oakland Athletics franchise, all as members of the American League, and their 7th season in Oakland. The Athletics won their fourth consecutive American League West title with a record of 90 wins and 72 losses. In the playoffs, the A's defeated the Baltimore Orioles in the ALCS for their third straight AL pennant, and in the World Series, the first ever played entirely on the West Coast, defeated the Los Angeles Dodgers in five games to take their third consecutive World Series championship. Paid attendance for the season was 845,693.

In early 1974, owner Charlie Finley tried to sell the team with an asking price of $15 million.

== Offseason ==
- November 3, 1973: Horacio Piña was traded by the Athletics to the Chicago Cubs for Bob Locker.
- December 12, 1973: Rico Carty was released by the Athletics.
- February 22, 1974: Reggie Jackson won an arbitration case for a $135,000 salary for the season, nearly doubling his previous year's $70,000.

== Regular season ==
- June 5, 1974: Outfielders Billy North and Reggie Jackson engaged in a clubhouse fight at Detroit's Tiger Stadium Jackson injured his shoulder, and catcher Ray Fosse, attempting to separate the combatants, suffered a crushed disk in his neck, costing him three months on the disabled list.

=== The pinch runner ===
In 1974, "Hurricane" Herb Washington was tapped by Oakland owner Charlie Finley to become the A's "designated runner." Despite having no professional baseball experience, and having last played baseball in high school, Washington was signed to a major league contract prior to the season. His major league debut was on April 4, 1974, against the Texas Rangers. Appearing as a pinch runner for Joe Rudi in game two of the 1974 World Series, Washington was picked off first base in a crucial ninth-inning situation by Dodgers' reliever Mike Marshall.

=== Season standings ===
AL West
Team	W	L	Pct.	GB	Home	Road
Oakland Athletics	90	72	.556	—	49‍–‍32	41‍–‍40
Texas Rangers	84	76	.525	5	42‍–‍38	42‍–‍38
Minnesota Twins	82	80	.506	8	48‍–‍33	34‍–‍47
Chicago White Sox	80	80	.500	9	46‍–‍34	34‍–‍46
Kansas City Royals	77	85	.475	13	40‍–‍41	37‍–‍44
California Angels	68	94	.420	22	36‍–‍45	32‍–‍49

=== Record vs. opponents ===
1974 American League record Sources:
Team	BAL	BOS	CAL	CWS	CLE	DET	KC	MIL	MIN	NYY	OAK	TEX
Baltimore	—	10–8	7–5	5–7	12–6	14–4	8–4	8–10	6–6	11–7	6–6	4–8
Boston	8–10	—	4–8	8–4	9–9	11–7	4–8	10–8	6–6	11–7	8–4	5–7
California	5–7	8–4	—	10–8–1	3–9	5–7	8–10	3–9	8–10	3–9	6–12	9–9
Chicago	7–5	4–8	8–10–1	—	8–4	7–5	11–7	8–4	7–11–1	4–8	7–11	9–7–1
Cleveland	6–12	9–9	9–3	4–8	—	9–9	8–4	10–8	6–6	7–11	5–7	4–8
Detroit	4–14	7–11	7–5	5–7	9–9	—	7–5	9–9	3–9	11–7	5–7	5–7
Kansas City	4–8	8–4	10–8	7–11	4–8	5–7	—	11–1	8–10	4–8	8–10	8–10
Milwaukee	10–8	8–10	9–3	4–8	8–10	9–9	1–11	—	6–6	9–9	5–7	7–5
Minnesota	6–6	6–6	10–8	11–7–1	6–6	9–3	10–8	6–6	—	4–8	5–13	9–9
New York	7–11	7–11	9–3	8–4	11–7	7–11	8–4	9–9	8–4	—	7–5	8–4
Oakland	6–6	4–8	12–6	11–7	7–5	7–5	10–8	7–5	13–5	5–7	—	8–10
Texas	8–4	7–5	9–9	7–9–1	8–4	7–5	10–8	5–7	9–9	4–8	10–8	—

=== Opening Day starters ===
- Sal Bando
- Vida Blue
- Bert Campaneris
- Reggie Jackson
- Ángel Mangual
- Billy North
- Joe Rudi
- Gene Tenace
- Manny Trillo

=== Notable transactions ===
- May 10, 1974: Dal Maxvill was signed as a free agent by the Athletics.
- June 5, 1974: Rick Lysander was drafted by the Athletics in the 19th round of the 1974 Major League Baseball draft.
- August 19, 1974: Pat Bourque was traded by the Athletics to the Minnesota Twins for Jim Holt.

=== Roster ===
1974 Oakland Athletics
Roster
Pitchers: 37 Glenn Abbott; 14 Vida Blue; 34 Rollie Fingers; 33 Dave Hamilton; 30 Ken Holtzman; 20 Leon Hooten; 27 Catfish Hunter; 32 Darold Knowles; 25 Paul Lindblad; 13 Blue Moon Odom; 39 Bill Parsons	Catchers: 10 Ray Fosse; 12 Larry Haney; 23 Tim Hosley; Infielders: 6 Sal Bando; 38 Pat Bourque; 19 Bert Campaneris; 24 John Donaldson; 29 Phil Garner; 1 Dick Green; 38 Jim Holt; 7 Deron Johnson; 11 Ted Kubiak; 16 Dal Maxvill; 21 Rich McKinney; 23 Gaylen Pitts; 18 Gene Tenace	Outfielders: 22 Jesús Alou; 37 Vic Davalillo; 9 Reggie Jackson; 2 Ángel Mangual; 4 Billy North; 26 Joe Rudi; 28 Champ Summers; 15 Claudell Washington; Designated runner: 3 Herb Washington	Manager: 5 Alvin Dark; Coaches: 41 Jerry Adair; 44 Bobby Hofman; 44 Vern Hoscheit; 43 Irv Noren; 42 Wes Stock; 43 Bobby Winkles

== Player stats ==
= Indicates team leader

=== Batting ===
==== Starters by position ====
Note: Pos = Position; G = Games played; AB = At bats; H = Hits; Avg. = Batting average; HR = Home runs; RBI = Runs batted in

Pos	Player	G	AB	H	Avg.	HR	RBI
C	Ray Fosse	64	204	40	.196	4	23
1B	Gene Tenace	158	484	102	.211	26	73
2B	Dick Green	100	287	61	.213	2	22
3B	Sal Bando	146	498	121	.243	22	103
SS	Bert Campaneris	134	527	153	.290	2	41
LF	Joe Rudi	158	593	174	.293	22	99
CF	Billy North	149	543	141	.260	4	33
RF	Reggie Jackson	148	506	146	.289	29	93
DH	Ángel Mangual	115	365	85	.233	9	43

==== Other batters ====
Note: G = Games played; AB = At bats; H = Hits; Avg. = Batting average; HR = Home runs; RBI = Runs batted in

Player	G	AB	H	Avg.	HR	RBI
Ángel Mangual	115	365	85	.233	9	43
Claudell Washington	73	221	63	.285	0	19
Ted Kubiak	99	220	46	.209	0	18
Deron Johnson	50	174	34	.195	7	23
Larry Haney	76	121	20	.165	2	3
Pat Bourque	73	96	22	.229	1	16
Dal Maxvill	60	52	10	.192	0	2
Jim Holt	30	42	6	.143	0	0
Gaylen Pitts	18	41	10	.244	0	3
Manny Trillo	21	33	5	.152	0	2
Phil Garner	30	28	5	.179	0	1
John Donaldson	10	15	2	.133	0	0
Tim Hosley	11	7	2	.286	0	1
Rich McKinney	5	7	1	.143	0	0
Herb Washington	92	0	0	----	0	0

=== Pitching ===
==== Starting pitchers ====
Note: G = Games pitched; IP = Innings pitched; W = Wins; L = Losses; ERA = Earned run average; SO = Strikeouts

Player	G	IP	W	L	ERA	SO
Catfish Hunter	41	318.1	25	12	2.49	143
Vida Blue	40	282.1	17	15	3.25	174
Ken Holtzman	39	255.1	19	17	3.07	117
Glenn Abbott	19	96.0	5	7	3.00	38

==== Other pitchers ====
Note: G = Games pitched; IP = Innings pitched; W = Wins; L = Losses; ERA = Earned run average; SO = Strikeouts

Player	G	IP	W	L	ERA	SO
Dave Hamilton	29	117.0	7	4	3.69	69
Blue Moon Odom	34	87.1	1	5	3.81	52

==== Relief pitchers ====
Note: G = Games pitched; W = Wins; L = Losses; SV = Saves; ERA = Earned run average; SO = Strikeouts

Player	G	W	L	SV	ERA	SO
Rollie Fingers	76	9	5	18	2.65	95
Paul Lindblad	45	4	4	6	2.06	46
Darold Knowles	45	3	3	3	4.22	18
Leon Hooten	6	0	0	0	3.24	1
Bill Parsons	4	0	0	0	0.00	2

== Postseason ==
=== ALCS ===
The Athletics defeated the Baltimore Orioles, 3 games to 1.

Game	Score	Date	Location	Attendance
1	Baltimore – 6, Oakland – 3	October 5	Oakland Coliseum	41,609
2	Baltimore – 0, Oakland – 5	October 6	Oakland Coliseum	42,810
3	Oakland – 1, Baltimore – 0	October 8	Memorial Stadium	32,060
4	Oakland – 2, Baltimore – 1	October 9	Memorial Stadium	28,136

=== 1974 World Series ===
==== Summary ====
AL Oakland Athletics (4) vs. NL Los Angeles Dodgers (1)
Game	Score	Date	Location	Attendance	Time of Game
1	Athletics – 3, Dodgers – 2	October 12	Dodger Stadium	55,974	2:43
2	Athletics – 2, Dodgers – 3	October 13	Dodger Stadium	55,989	2:40
3	Dodgers – 2, Athletics – 3	October 15	Oakland-Alameda County Coliseum	49,347	2:35
4	Dodgers – 2, Athletics – 5	October 16	Oakland-Alameda County Coliseum	49,347	2:17
5	Dodgers – 2, Athletics – 3	October 17	Oakland-Alameda County Coliseum	49,347	2:23

== Awards and honors ==
- Rollie Fingers, World Series Most Valuable Player Award
- Catfish Hunter, P, American League Cy Young Award

=== All-Stars ===
1974 Major League Baseball All-Star Game

- Bert Campaneris, shortstop, starter
- Reggie Jackson, outfield, starter
- Sal Bando, reserve
- Rollie Fingers, reserve
- Catfish Hunter, reserve
- Joe Rudi, reserve

== Farm system ==
Level	Team	League	Manager
AAA	Tucson Toros	Pacific Coast League	Sherm Lollar
AA	Birmingham A's	Southern League	Harry Bright
A	Burlington Bees	Midwest League	Rene Lachemann
A-Short Season	Lewiston Broncos	Northwest League	Bobby Hofman and Buddy Peterson
