= John Hale (baseball) =

American baseball player (born 1953)

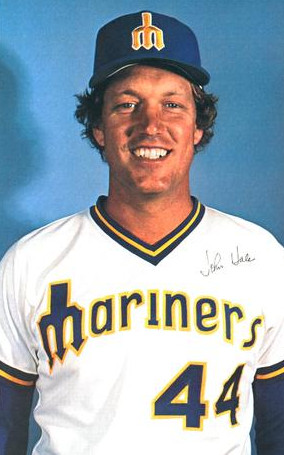
- Hale in 1978
- Outfielder
- Born: August 5, 1953 (age 73); Fresno, California, U.S.
- Batted: Left Threw: Right

MLB debut
- September 8, 1974, for the Los Angeles Dodgers

Last MLB appearance
- August 1, 1979, for the Seattle Mariners

MLB statistics
- Batting average: .201
- Home runs: 14
- Runs batted in: 72
- Stats at Baseball Reference

Teams
- Los Angeles Dodgers (1974–1977); Seattle Mariners (1978–1979)

John Steven Hale (born August 5, 1953) is an American former outfielder and first baseman in Major League Baseball. He played from 1974 to 1979 for the Los Angeles Dodgers and Seattle Mariners.

Hale attended Wasco Union High School in Wasco, California, then Cal State Bakersfield. The Dodgers drafted him in the 14th round of the 1971 MLB draft.

In 1974, Hale, as a September call-up, recorded four hits in four at bats across four games, consisting of three singles and one double, with two runs batted in (RBI). This included a game-winning RBI when the Dodgers clinched the National League West division title on October 1. This set a record for the most at bats in a season with a perfect 1.000 batting average, breaking the record of three at bats held by Alphonso Gerard (1947), Jim Brideweser (1953), John Paciorek (1963), and Sparky Lyle (1971).

The Toronto Blue Jays claimed Hale off waivers in September 1977, but he did not come to terms with the Blue Jays. He signed with the Mariners after that season. He played in a career-high 107 MLB games in 1978, batting .171 with four home runs.

Hale played in the minors for two years after his MLB tenure ended. He led the Indianapolis Indians in home runs and RBI in 1980 while leading the American Association in strikeouts.
