= Rex Hudson =

American baseball player (born 1953)

- Pitcher
- Born: August 11, 1953 (age 72); Tulsa, Oklahoma, U.S.
- Batted: Switch Threw: Right

MLB debut
- July 27, 1974, for the Los Angeles Dodgers

Last MLB appearance
- July 27, 1974, for the Los Angeles Dodgers

MLB statistics
- Record: 0-0
- Earned run average: 22.50
- Strikeouts: 0
- Stats at Baseball Reference

Teams
- Los Angeles Dodgers (1974)

Rex Haughton Hudson (born August 11, 1953) is an American former pitcher in Major League Baseball. He pitched two innings for the Los Angeles Dodgers against the Atlanta Braves on July 27, 1974. He allowed a three-run home run to Hank Aaron in that game. He is a graduate of Nathan Hale High School in Tulsa Oklahoma.
