= 1974 Major League Baseball season =

1974 MLB season
- League: American League (AL); National League (NL)
- Sport: Baseball
- Duration: Regular season: April 4 – October 2, 1974; Postseason: October 5–17, 1974
- Games: 162
- Teams: 24 (12 per league)
- TV partner: NBC

Draft
- Top draft pick: Bill Almon
- Picked by: San Diego Padres

Regular season
- Season MVP: AL: Jeff Burroughs (TEX); NL: Steve Garvey (LAD)

Postseason
- AL champions: Oakland Athletics
- AL runners-up: Baltimore Orioles
- NL champions: Los Angeles Dodgers
- NL runners-up: Pittsburgh Pirates

World Series
- Champions: Oakland Athletics
- Runners-up: Los Angeles Dodgers
- World Series MVP: Rollie Fingers (OAK)

MLB seasons
- ← 1973 1975 →

Locations of teams for the 1974–1975 American League seasons
West East
Locations of teams for the 1971–1976 National League seasons
West East

The 1974 major league baseball season began on April 4 while the regular season ended on October 2. The postseason began on October 5. The 71st World Series then began on October 12 and concluded on October 17 with the Oakland Athletics of the American League defeating the Los Angeles Dodgers of the National League, four games to one, to win their eighth title in franchise history, winning their third consecutive World Series title, and their third since moving to Oakland in 1968.

The 45th All-Star Game was held on July 23 at Three Rivers Stadium in Pittsburgh, Pennsylvania, home of the Pittsburgh Pirates. The National League won, 7–2, and was the third win in what would be an 11-game win streak that lasted until 1983.

Two notable personal milestones were achieved during the 1974 season. The first came on April 8, when Hank Aaron of the Atlanta Braves hit his 715th career home run, breaking the all-time career home run mark of 714 set by Babe Ruth. Aaron would finish his career in 1976 with 755 home runs, a record that would stand until Barry Bonds broke it in 2007. The second milestone came on September 10, when the St. Louis Cardinals' Lou Brock stole his 105th base off pitcher Dick Ruthven and catcher Bob Boone of the Philadelphia Phillies. This broke the single-season stolen base record of 104, set by Maury Wills in 1962. Brock stole 118 bases for the season, a record that would stand until 1982, when Rickey Henderson stole 130.

== Schedule ==
The 1974 schedule consisted of 162 games for all teams in the American League and National League, each of which had 12 teams. Each league was split into two six-team divisions. Each team was scheduled to play 18 games against their five division rivals, totaling 90 games, and 12 games against six interdivision opponents, totaling 72 games. This continued the format put in place since the 1969 and would be used until 1977 in the American League and 1993 in the National League.

Opening Day took place on April 4, featuring four teams. The final day of the regular season was on October 2, featuring 22 teams. The League Championship Series for both leagues began on October 5 and ended on October 9. The World Series took place between October 12 and October 17.

== Rule changes ==
The 1974 season saw the following rule changes:

- To play the World Series, player eligibility rules were clarified, such that a player must be on a team roster on August 31 and the remainder of the season to be eligible to play.
- The save rule was amended:
  - A save can be credited to a pitcher when either the potential tying or winning run is on base or hitting, or when a pitcher pitches for at least three innings. In all situations, the lead must be preserved.
  - If multiple relief pitches qualify for a save, the pitcher judged to be more effective will be credited with a save. While crediting a save is not mandatory, only one pitcher may receive credit for a save.
- Minimum standards for individual championships, including those between major league and minor league standards, were outlined.
- Rules regarding players wearing ear flaps on their batting helmets were enforced, though most existing Major League players were grandfathered out of these enforcements. Any Major League player who had either no professional league experience prior to their role in the majors, or Major League players who played in the National Association in 1973 were required to wear ear flaps.
- Penalties to pitchers who tarnished the ball (such as using a foreign substance, defacing the ball, throwing a spitball, etc.) were loosened from an immediate rejection. Now, penalties to pitcher were dependent on whether it was their first offense. Additionally, though a pitcher will still be penalized, an offensive manager could accept the play in which a violation occurred unless the batter and runners advanced at least one base.

== Teams ==
League	Division	Team	City	Ballpark	Capacity	Manager
American League	East	Baltimore Orioles	Baltimore, Maryland	Baltimore Memorial Stadium	53,208	Earl Weaver
American League	East	Boston Red Sox	Boston, Massachusetts	Fenway Park	33,368	Darrell Johnson
American League	East	Cleveland Indians	Cleveland, Ohio	Cleveland Stadium	74,483	Ken Aspromonte
American League	East	Detroit Tigers	Detroit, Michigan	Tiger Stadium	52,806	Ralph Houk
American League	East	Milwaukee Brewers	Milwaukee, Wisconsin	Milwaukee County Stadium	53,192	Del Crandall
American League	East	New York Yankees	New York, New York	Shea Stadium	55,601	Bill Virdon
American League	West	California Angels	Anaheim, California	Anaheim Stadium	43,500	Bobby Winkles
American League	West	California Angels	Anaheim, California	Anaheim Stadium	43,500	Whitey Herzog
American League	West	California Angels	Anaheim, California	Anaheim Stadium	43,500	Dick Williams
American League	West	Chicago White Sox	Chicago, Illinois	White Sox Park	44,492	Chuck Tanner
American League	West	Kansas City Royals	Kansas City, Missouri	Royals Stadium	40,613	Jack McKeon
American League	West	Minnesota Twins	Bloomington, Minnesota	Metropolitan Stadium	45,919	Frank Quilici
American League	West	Oakland Athletics	Oakland, California	Oakland–Alameda County Coliseum	50,000	Alvin Dark
American League	West	Texas Rangers	Arlington, Texas	Arlington Stadium	35,649	Billy Martin
National League	East	Chicago Cubs	Chicago, Illinois	Wrigley Field	37,702	Whitey Lockman
National League	East	Chicago Cubs	Chicago, Illinois	Wrigley Field	37,702	Jim Marshall
National League	East	Montreal Expos	Montreal, Quebec	Jarry Park Stadium	29,125	Gene Mauch
National League	East	New York Mets	New York, New York	Shea Stadium	55,601	Yogi Berra
National League	East	Philadelphia Phillies	Philadelphia, Pennsylvania	Veterans Stadium	62,382	Danny Ozark
National League	East	Pittsburgh Pirates	Pittsburgh, Pennsylvania	Three Rivers Stadium	58,722	Danny Murtaugh
National League	East	St. Louis Cardinals	St. Louis, Missouri	Civic Center Busch Memorial Stadium	53,138	Red Schoendienst
National League	West	Atlanta Braves	Atlanta, Georgia	Atlanta Stadium	52,780	Eddie Mathews
National League	West	Atlanta Braves	Atlanta, Georgia	Atlanta Stadium	52,780	Clyde King
National League	West	Cincinnati Reds	Cincinnati, Ohio	Riverfront Stadium	52,953	Sparky Anderson
National League	West	Houston Astros	Houston, Texas	Houston Astrodome	47,000	Preston Gómez
National League	West	Los Angeles Dodgers	Los Angeles, California	Dodger Stadium	56,000	Walter Alston
National League	West	San Diego Padres	San Diego, California	San Diego Stadium	50,000	John McNamara
National League	West	San Francisco Giants	San Francisco, California	Candlestick Park	58,945	Charlie Fox
National League	West	San Francisco Giants	San Francisco, California	Candlestick Park	58,945	Wes Westrum

== Standings ==
=== American League ===
AL East
Team	W	L	Pct.	GB	Home	Road
Baltimore Orioles	91	71	.562	—	46‍–‍35	45‍–‍36
New York Yankees	89	73	.549	2	47‍–‍34	42‍–‍39
Boston Red Sox	84	78	.519	7	46‍–‍35	38‍–‍43
Cleveland Indians	77	85	.475	14	40‍–‍41	37‍–‍44
Milwaukee Brewers	76	86	.469	15	40‍–‍41	36‍–‍45
Detroit Tigers	72	90	.444	19	36‍–‍45	36‍–‍45

AL West
Team	W	L	Pct.	GB	Home	Road
Oakland Athletics	90	72	.556	—	49‍–‍32	41‍–‍40
Texas Rangers	84	76	.525	5	42‍–‍38	42‍–‍38
Minnesota Twins	82	80	.506	8	48‍–‍33	34‍–‍47
Chicago White Sox	80	80	.500	9	46‍–‍34	34‍–‍46
Kansas City Royals	77	85	.475	13	40‍–‍41	37‍–‍44
California Angels	68	94	.420	22	36‍–‍45	32‍–‍49

=== National League ===
NL East
Team	W	L	Pct.	GB	Home	Road
Pittsburgh Pirates	88	74	.543	—	52‍–‍29	36‍–‍45
St. Louis Cardinals	86	75	.534	1½	44‍–‍37	42‍–‍38
Philadelphia Phillies	80	82	.494	8	46‍–‍35	34‍–‍47
Montreal Expos	79	82	.491	8½	42‍–‍38	37‍–‍44
New York Mets	71	91	.438	17	36‍–‍45	35‍–‍46
Chicago Cubs	66	96	.407	22	32‍–‍49	34‍–‍47

NL West
Team	W	L	Pct.	GB	Home	Road
Los Angeles Dodgers	102	60	.630	—	52‍–‍29	50‍–‍31
Cincinnati Reds	98	64	.605	4	50‍–‍31	48‍–‍33
Atlanta Braves	88	74	.543	14	46‍–‍35	42‍–‍39
Houston Astros	81	81	.500	21	46‍–‍35	35‍–‍46
San Francisco Giants	72	90	.444	30	37‍–‍44	35‍–‍46
San Diego Padres	60	102	.370	42	36‍–‍45	24‍–‍57

=== Tie games ===
4 tie games (3 in AL, 1 in NL), which are not factored into winning percentage or games behind (and were often replayed again) occurred throughout the season.

==== American League ====
The Chicago White Sox had three tie games. The California Angels, Minnesota Twins, and Texas Rangers had one tie each.

- April 7, Chicago White Sox vs. California Angels, tied at 4 following the 10th inning on account of snow and low visibility.
- April 11, Minnesota Twins vs. Chicago White Sox, tied at 4 following a shortened six innings due to an unplayable field following a 38 minute rain delay.
- September 12, Chicago White Sox vs. Texas Rangers, tied at 2 following a shortened six innings on account of a 45 minute rain delay.

==== National League ====
The Atlanta Braves and Cincinnati Reds had one tie each.

- September 11, Cincinnati Reds vs. Atlanta Braves, tied at 1 following a shortened five innings on account of a two hour and 17 minute rain delay.

== Postseason ==
The postseason began on October 5 and ended on October 17 with the Oakland Athletics defeating the Los Angeles Dodgers in the 1974 World Series in five games.

=== Bracket ===
League Championship Series (ALCS, NLCS)
East	Baltimore	1
West	Oakland	3
East	Pittsburgh	1
West	Los Angeles	3

World Series
AL	Oakland	4
NL	Los Angeles	1

== Managerial changes ==
=== Off-season ===
Team	Former Manager	New Manager
Boston Red Sox	Eddie Popowski	Darrell Johnson
Detroit Tigers	Joe Schultz Jr.	Ralph Houk
Houston Astros	Leo Durocher	Preston Gómez
New York Yankees	Ralph Houk	Bill Virdon
Oakland Athletics	Dick Williams	Alvin Dark
San Diego Padres	Don Zimmer	John McNamara

=== In-season ===
Team	Former Manager	New Manager
Atlanta Braves	Eddie Mathews	Clyde King
California Angels	Bobby Winkles	Whitey Herzog
California Angels	Whitey Herzog	Dick Williams
Chicago Cubs	Whitey Lockman	Jim Marshall
San Francisco Giants	Charlie Fox	Wes Westrum

== League leaders ==
=== American League ===
Hitting leaders
Stat	Player	Total
AVG	Rod Carew (MIN)	.364
OPS	Dick Allen (CWS)	.938
HR	Dick Allen (CWS)	32
RBI	Jeff Burroughs (TEX)	118
R	Carl Yastrzemski (BOS)	93
H	Rod Carew (MIN)	218
SB	Billy North (OAK)	54

Pitching leaders
Stat	Player	Total
W	Catfish Hunter (OAK); Ferguson Jenkins (TEX)	25
L	Mickey Lolich (DET)	21
ERA	Catfish Hunter (OAK)	2.49
K	Nolan Ryan (CAL)	367
IP	Nolan Ryan (CAL)	332.2
SV	Terry Forster (CWS)	24
WHIP	Catfish Hunter (OAK)	0.986

=== National League ===
Hitting leaders
Stat	Player	Total
AVG	Ralph Garr (ATL)	.353
OPS	Willie Stargell (PIT)	.944
HR	Mike Schmidt (PHI)	36
RBI	Johnny Bench (CIN)	129
R	Pete Rose (CIN)	110
H	Ralph Garr (ATL)	214
SB	Lou Brock (STL)	118

Pitching leaders
Stat	Player	Total
W	Andy Messersmith (LAD); Phil Niekro (ATL)	20
L	Bill Bonham (CHC); Randy Jones (SD); Steve Rogers (MON)	22
ERA	Buzz Capra (ATL)	2.28
K	Steve Carlton (PHI)	240
IP	Phil Niekro (ATL)	302.1
SV	Mike Marshall (LAD)	21
WHIP	Andy Messersmith (LAD)	1.098

== Milestones ==
=== Batters ===
==== Cycles ====
- Richie Zisk (PIT):
  - Zisk hit for his first cycle and 19th in franchise history, on June 9 against the San Francisco Giants.

==== Other batting accomplishments ====
- Hank Aaron (ATL):
  - Broke the Major League career home run record when he hit his 715th home run against Al Downing of the Los Angeles Dodgers in the fourth inning on April 8, surpassing the record of 714 home runs set by Babe Ruth in 1935.
  - Broke the National League career grand slam record when he his 15th grand slam against Ray Burris of the Chicago Cubs in the seventh inning on April 26, surpassing the record of 14 grand slams set by Gil Hodges and Willie McCovey. He would set the record on when he hit his 16th career grand slam against Eddie Watt of the Philadelphia Phillies in the seventh inning on June 4.
  - Became the fourth player in major league history to play in 3,000 games on May 29 against the Philadelphia Phillies.
- Lou Brock (STL):
  - Recorded his 700th career stolen base in the first inning against the Chicago Cubs on July 29. He became the seventh player to reach this mark.
  - Broke the Major League season stolen base record when he stole his 105th base off pitcher Dick Ruthven and catcher Bob Boone of the Philadelphia Phillies on September 10, surpassing the record of 104 stolen bases set by Maury Wills in 1962. Brock would finish the season with 118 stolen bases a record that would stand until 1982, when Rickey Henderson stole 130.
- Al Kaline (DET):
  - Became the 12th member of the 3,000-hit club with a double in the fourth inning against the Baltimore Orioles on September 24.

=== Pitchers ===
==== No-hitters ====
- Steve Busby (KC):
  - Busby threw his second career no-hitter and the second no-hitter in franchise history, by defeating the Milwaukee Brewers 2–0 on June 19. He walked one and struck out three.
- Dick Bosman (CLE):
  - Bosman threw his first career no-hitter and the 12th no-hitter in franchise history, by defeating the Oakland Athletics 4–0 on July 19. He struck out four and caused a fielding error, throwing 60 strikes on 79 pitches.
- Nolan Ryan (CAL):
  - Ryan threw his third career no-hitter and the fifth no-hitter in franchise history, by defeating the Minnesota Twins 4–0 on September 28. He walked eight and struck out 15.

==== Other pitching accomplishments ====
- Dock Ellis (PIT):
  - Tied a Major League record by becoming the third pitcher to hit three consecutive batters by pitch, the first since 1898, in a game against the Cincinnati Reds on May 1.
- Mel Stottlemyre (NYY):
  - Set an American League record when he made his 272nd consecutive start with no relief appearances.
- Bob Gibson (STL):
  - Became the second member of the 3,000 strikeout club by striking out César Gerónimo of the Cincinnati Reds in the second inning on July 17.
- Nolan Ryan (CAL):
  - Set an American League record and became the fifth all-time and third modern Major League player to strike out 19 batters for most strikeouts in a single nine-inning game in a 4–2 win against the Boston Red Sox on August 12.

=== Miscellaneous ===
- Rick Burleson (BOS):
  - Tied a major league record by committing three fielding errors in his major league debut.
- St. Louis Cardinals:
  - Set a major league record for most runs scored in the 25th inning, by scoring one run against the New York Mets on September 11.

== Awards and honors ==
=== Regular season ===
Baseball Writers' Association of America Awards
BBWAA Award	National League	American League
Rookie of the Year	Bake McBride (STL)	Mike Hargrove (TEX)
Cy Young Award	Mike Marshall (LAD)	Catfish Hunter (OAK)
Most Valuable Player	Steve Garvey (LAD)	Jeff Burroughs (TEX)
Babe Ruth Award (World Series MVP)	—	Dick Green (OAK)
Gold Glove Awards
Position	National League	American League
Pitcher	Andy Messersmith (LAD)	Jim Kaat (CWS)
Catcher	Johnny Bench (CIN)	Thurman Munson (NYY)
1st Base	Steve Garvey (LAD)	George Scott (MIL)
2nd Base	Joe Morgan (CIN)	Bobby Grich (BAL)
3rd Base	Doug Rader (HOU)	Brooks Robinson (BAL)
Shortstop	Dave Concepción (CIN)	Mark Belanger (BAL)
Outfield	Bobby Bonds (SF)	Paul Blair (BAL)
Outfield	César Cedeño (HOU)	Amos Otis (KC)
Outfield	César Gerónimo (CIN)	Joe Rudi (OAK)

=== Other awards ===
- Outstanding Designated Hitter Award: Tommy Davis (BAL)
- Roberto Clemente Award (Humanitarian): Willie Stargell (PIT)
- Hutch Award: Danny Thompson (MIN)
- Sport Magazine's World Series Most Valuable Player Award: Rollie Fingers (OAK)

The Sporting News Awards
Award	National League	American League
Player of the Year	Lou Brock (STL)	—
Pitcher of the Year	Mike Marshall (LAD)	Catfish Hunter (OAK)
Fireman of the Year (Relief pitcher)	Mike Marshall (LAD)	Terry Forster (CWS)
Rookie Player of the Year	Greg Gross (HOU)	Mike Hargrove (TEX)
Rookie Pitcher of the Year	John D'Acquisto (SF)	Frank Tanana (CAL)
Comeback Player of the Year	Jimmy Wynn (LAD)	Ferguson Jenkins (TEX)
Manager of the Year	—	Bill Virdon (NYY)
Executive of the Year	—	Gabe Paul (NYY)

=== Monthly awards ===
==== Player of the Month ====
Month	National League	American League
April	Tommy John (LAD)	Graig Nettles (NYY)
May	Ralph Garr (ATL)	Rod Carew (MIN)
June	Buzz Capra (ATL)	Gaylord Perry (CLE)
July	Don Gullett (CIN)	Doc Medich (NYY)
August	Lou Brock (STL)	Nolan Ryan (CAL)
September	—	Al Kaline (DET)

=== Baseball Hall of Fame ===
- Cool Papa Bell
- Jim Bottomley
- Whitey Ford
- Mickey Mantle
- Sam Thompson
- Jocko Conlan (umpire)

== Home field attendance ==
Team name	Wins	%±	Home attendance	%±	Per game
Los Angeles Dodgers	102	7.4%	2,632,474	23.2%	32,500
Cincinnati Reds	98	−1.0%	2,164,307	7.3%	26,394
St. Louis Cardinals	86	6.2%	1,838,413	16.8%	22,696
Philadelphia Phillies	80	12.7%	1,808,648	22.5%	22,329
New York Mets	71	−13.4%	1,722,209	−9.9%	21,262
Boston Red Sox	84	−5.6%	1,556,411	5.1%	19,215
New York Yankees	89	11.3%	1,273,075	0.9%	15,717
Detroit Tigers	72	−15.3%	1,243,080	−27.9%	15,347
Texas Rangers	84	47.4%	1,193,902	74.0%	14,924
Kansas City Royals	77	−12.5%	1,173,292	−12.8%	14,485
Chicago White Sox	80	3.9%	1,149,596	−11.7%	14,019
Cleveland Indians	77	8.5%	1,114,262	81.1%	13,756
Pittsburgh Pirates	88	10.0%	1,110,552	−15.9%	13,711
Houston Astros	81	−1.2%	1,090,728	−21.8%	13,466
San Diego Padres	60	0.0%	1,075,399	75.8%	13,277
Montreal Expos	79	0.0%	1,019,134	−18.3%	12,739
Chicago Cubs	66	−14.3%	1,015,378	−24.9%	12,536
Atlanta Braves	88	15.8%	981,085	22.5%	12,112
Baltimore Orioles	91	−6.2%	962,572	0.4%	11,884
Milwaukee Brewers	76	2.7%	955,741	−12.5%	11,799
California Angels	68	−13.9%	917,269	−13.3%	11,324
Oakland Athletics	90	−4.3%	845,693	−15.5%	10,441
Minnesota Twins	82	1.2%	662,401	−27.0%	8,078
San Francisco Giants	72	−18.2%	519,987	−37.7%	6,420

== Venues ==
The New York Yankees temporarily leave Yankee Stadium and move to Shea Stadium, the home of their cross-town rival New York Mets, for two seasons. The team would return to Yankee Stadium in 1976 following the completion of renovations.

== Media ==
=== Television ===
NBC was the exclusive national TV broadcaster of MLB, airing the weekend Game of the Week, Monday Night Baseball, the All-Star Game, both League Championship Series, and the World Series.

== Retired numbers ==
- Whitey Ford had his No. 16 retired by the New York Yankees on August 3. This was the eighth number retired by the team.
- Dizzy Dean had his No. 17 retired by the St. Louis Cardinals on September 22. This was the second number retired by the team.

== See also ==
- 1974 in baseball (Events, Births, Deaths)
- 1974 Nippon Professional Baseball season
