= Art Williams (umpire) =

American baseball umpire (1934–1979)

- Born: Arthur Williams; February 24, 1934; Camden, Arkansas, U.S.
- Died: February 8, 1979 (aged 44); Bakersfield, California, U.S.
- Resting place: Union Cemetery, Bakersfield, California
- Occupation: Umpire
- Years active: 1972–1977
- Employer: National League

Arthur Williams (February 24, 1934 – February 8, 1979) was an American professional baseball umpire who worked in the National League (NL) from 1972 to 1977, and was the first African-American umpire in the NL, wearing number 25 during his career. Williams umpired 806 Major League Baseball (MLB) games in his six-year career. He also umpired in the 1975 National League Championship Series.

== Biography ==
=== Career ===
Art Williams had pitched high school baseball in Bakersfield, California. He entered minor league baseball, but suffered a career-ending elbow injury. He was umpiring local recreational baseball in Bakersfield when a former scout for the San Francisco Giants encouraged him to attend umpire school. He attended umpire school in 1969 and then began umpiring in the minor leagues.

Williams became the first black umpire in the NL when he worked 19 games at the end of the 1972 season. He was promoted to full-time status when the NL purchased his contract from the Triple-A International League on March 21, 1973. He was assigned to the postseason once, working the 1975 National League Championship Series. He was fired after the 1977 season, having worked 806 games in six MLB seasons. He remained the only black NL umpire in his last season. At a hearing a few months after his firing, he claimed that his dismissal may have been motivated by racism. He said that, with the planned promotion of umpire Eric Gregg, the league did not want to accommodate two black umpires among its ranks. A complaint with the Equal Employment Opportunity Commission was still pending at the time of his death.

=== Death ===
Williams drove a bus in Bakersfield until he suffered a seizure in the fall of 1978. He underwent brain surgery and was in a coma for six weeks until his death on February 8, 1979.

== See also ==
- List of Major League Baseball umpires (disambiguation)
