= Andy Olsen =

American baseball umpire (1930-2014)

- Born: Andrew Holger Olsen; November 30, 1930; Brooklyn, New York, U.S.
- Died: May 23, 2014 (aged 83); St. Petersburg, Florida, U.S.
- Occupation: Umpire
- Years active: 1968-1980
- Employer: National League

Andrew Holger Olsen (November 30, 1930 - May 23, 2014) was an American professional baseball umpire who worked in the National League from 1968 to 1980, wearing uniform number 12 for most of his career. Olsen umpired 1,860 major league games in his 13-year career. He umpired in the 1974 World Series, three League Championship Series (1971, 1975, and 1978) and the 1976 Major League Baseball All-Star Game. Olsen also played in the minor leagues from 1949 to 1956, as a pitcher.

He was born in Brooklyn, New York.

== See also ==
- List of Major League Baseball umpires (disambiguation)
