= Larry Demery =

American baseball player (1953–2024)

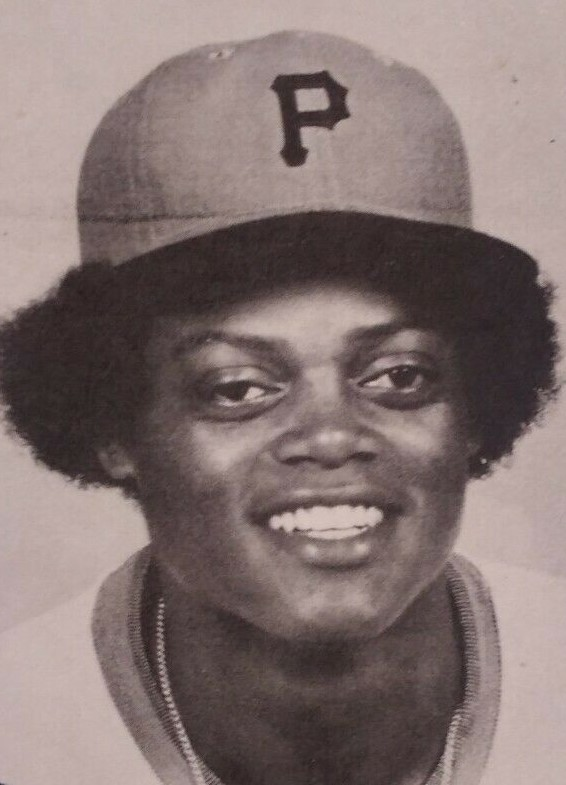
- Pitcher
- Born: June 4, 1953; Bakersfield, California, U.S.
- Died: February 20, 2024 (aged 70); Bakersfield, California, U.S.
- Batted: Right Threw: Right

MLB debut
- June 2, 1974, for the Pittsburgh Pirates

Last MLB appearance
- September 24, 1977, for the Pittsburgh Pirates

MLB statistics
- Win–loss record: 29–23
- Earned run average: 3.72
- Strikeouts: 217
- Stats at Baseball Reference

Teams
- Pittsburgh Pirates (1974–1977)

Lawrence Calvin Demery (June 4, 1953 – February 20, 2024) was an American Major League Baseball pitcher. He played all or part of four seasons in the majors, from 1974 until 1977, for the Pittsburgh Pirates.

== Early life and career ==
A native of Bakersfield, California, Demery was the son of fellow major leaguer Art Demery. He played baseball at Wasco High School and later at Locke High School in Los Angeles, where he threw two no-hitters. Demery attended Los Angeles City College, where he played college baseball.

== Professional career ==
The Pittsburgh Pirates selected Demery in the seventh round of the 1972 MLB draft. He began his professional career that year with the Gastonia Pirates and walked more batters than any other pitcher in the Western Carolinas League. He spent most of the following season in the Carolina League, which he led with fourteen complete games.

Demery made his major league debut on June 2, 1974, against the Cincinnati Reds. He entered in relief of Bruce Kison at Riverfront Stadium and struck out four of the six batters he faced without allowing a run. He played for the Pirates until 1977.

== Later life and death ==
As of December 2008, Demery lived in Bakersfield, California. He died on February 20, 2024, at the age of 70.

Demery appeared in the 2014 film No No: A Dockumentary.
