= Andy Messersmith =

American baseball player (born 1945)

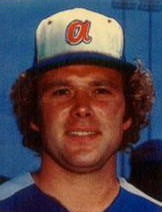
- Pitcher
- Born: August 6, 1945 (age 80); Toms River, New Jersey, U.S.
- Batted: Right Threw: Right

MLB debut
- July 4, 1968, for the California Angels

Last MLB appearance
- June 1, 1979, for the Los Angeles Dodgers

MLB statistics
- Win–loss record: 130–99
- Earned run average: 2.86
- Strikeouts: 1,625
- Stats at Baseball Reference

Teams
- California Angels (1968–1972); Los Angeles Dodgers (1973–1975); Atlanta Braves (1976–1977); New York Yankees (1978); Los Angeles Dodgers (1979)

Career highlights and awards
- 4× All-Star (1971, 1974–1976); 2× Gold Glove Award (1974, 1975); NL wins leader (1974)

John Alexander "Andy" Messersmith (born August 6, 1945) is an American former Major League Baseball right-handed pitcher. During a 12-year baseball career, he pitched for the California Angels (1968–72), Los Angeles Dodgers (1973–75 and 1979), Atlanta Braves (1976–77) and the New York Yankees (1978). As a member of the Dodgers, he appeared in the 1974 World Series.

== Early life ==
Messersmith was born on August 6, 1945, in Toms River, New Jersey. His father John was a doctor. At the age of five his family moved to Orange County, California. He attended Woodrow Wilson High School in Long Beach, but transferred to Western High School in Anaheim from which he graduated.

In 1963, as a senior, the 6 ft tall (1.83 m) Messersmith had a 14–1 regular season won–loss record as a pitcher for Western's baseball team, a 0.75 earned run average (ERA), and a .344 batting average as a hitter. This was the only year he played primarily as a pitcher in high school. He ended the 1963 season 15–2 or 16–2 overall, losing in a close championship game. He had two no-hitters and a 17-strike out game. Western came in second the 1963 California Interscholastic Federation (CIF) AAA playoffs, and Messersmith was named first-team All-CIF as a pitcher and Sunset League Player of the Year. He was unanimously selected as the Orange County Player of the Year by the Orange County Sportswriters. He was also the school's quarterback in football, but did not play as a senior due to injury.

== College ==
Messersmith originally wanted to attend the University of Southern California (USC), but the school only offered him half of a scholarship to play baseball. He received full scholarship offers from the University of California, Berkeley (Cal) and the University of California at Los Angeles (UCLA) and chose Cal. In 1965 as a Cal sophomore, he had an 8–2 record, while leading the California Intercollegiate Baseball Association (CIBA) with a 1.63 ERA. He was unanimously selected to the 1965 CIBA All-Star Team, and was named an All-American. He wanted a $50,000 signing bonus from any team that was asking him to leave college in 1965. The Detroit Tigers and/or Boston Red Sox drafted him in 1965, but he returned to play at Cal for another year. He had an 8–5 record in his junior year. Overall at Cal, he had a 16–7 record with a 2.00 ERA.

== Professional career ==
Following his junior year of college, the California Angels drafted Messersmith with the 12th overall pick in the June 1966 secondary amateur draft for players previously drafted but not signed within six months. That same month Roland Hemond, head of the Angels' farm system, signed Messersmith for approximately $65,000.

=== Minor leagues ===
In 1966, the Angels assigned Messersmith to the Triple-A Seattle Angels of the Pacific Coast League (PCL). He started 12 of the 18 games in which he pitched, with a 4–6 record and 3.36 ERA. In 1967, he was sent down to the Double-A El Paso Sun Kings of the Texas League, where he started 18 games, with a 9–7 record and 4.34 ERA. In 1968, he played part of the season in Seattle again, starting 11 games with nine appearances as a relief pitcher, and going 6–7 with a 2.96 ERA.

=== Major leagues ===
==== California Angels ====
Messersmith appeared in 28 games for the Angels in 1968, starting five. He had a 4–2 record, three saves and a 2.21 ERA. In his September 6, 1968 debut as a starting pitcher, against 1967 Cy Young Award winner Jim Lonborg, Messersmith pitched at two-hit shutout, winning the game 4–0 against the Boston Red Sox.

Messersmith pitched a full season with the Angels in 1969. He started 33 games, with a 16–11 record, a 2.52 ERA, and 211 strikeouts in 250 innings pitched, with 100 bases on balls. He did this on a team that was 71–91, fifth worst in the American League (AL). He led all major league pitchers in least hits per nine innings pitched (6.084), had the AL's fourth best ERA among starting pitchers, fifth best WAR (wins above replacement) for pitchers (5.3), and third best strikeouts per nine innings pitched (7.596). In 1970, he was 11–10 with a 3.01 ERA, and led the AL in hits per nine innings (6.658).

In 1971, Messersmith had his best year with the Angels. Once again the Angels were a below average team, with a 76–86 record (.469 winning percentage), 25.5 games behind the Western Division champion Oakland Athletics. Messersmith, however, had a 20–13 record (.606 winning percentage) in 38 starts, with a 2.99 ERA in 276.2 innings pitched, four shutouts, and 14 complete games. He was selected to the AL All-Star Team for the first time, and was fifth in voting for the Cy Young Award.

In 1972, Messersmith had physical problems with his right index finger (on his pitching hand), that required in-season surgery. He missed nearly two months of play, and started only 21 games on the year. His record fell to 8–11 in 169.2 innings pitched, while his ERA improved to 2.81. The Angels had another mediocre year (75–80).

In November 1972, the Angels traded Messersmith and infielder Ken McMullen to the Los Angeles Dodgers for five players - Frank Robinson, Bill Singer, Billy Grabarkewitz, Bobby Valentine, and Mike Strahler. In his five years with the Angels, Messersmith was 59–47 with a 2.78 ERA. During those five years, the Angels only had one winning season (86–76 in 1970).

==== Los Angeles Dodgers ====
Messersmith joined a strong Dodger rotation in 1973 that included, among others, future Hall of Fame pitcher Don Sutton (18–10), Claude Osteen (16–11) and Tommy John (16–7). The team had a 95–66 record (second place in the National League (NL) Western Division), and Messersmith finished the season with a 14–10 record and 2.70 ERA in 33 starts.

He shined in 1974, finishing with 20 wins and 6 losses and a 2.59 ERA, on a Dodgers team that won the NL West with a 102–60 record. He was the NL's starting pitcher in the 1974 Major League Baseball All-Star Game. He led the NL with 1.098 WHIP (walks plus hits per inning pitched), tied for most wins, had the second best winning percentage and the fifth best ERA. Messersmith finished second in balloting for the Cy Young Award, which was won by his Dodger teammate, relief pitcher Mike Marshall. He was 16th in NL Most Valuable Player (MVP) voting. He also won the Gold Glove Award for the best NL fielding pitcher in 1974.

Messersmith started and won Game 2 of the 1974 National League Championship Series (NLCS) against the Pittsburgh Pirates, giving up two runs in seven innings. The Dodgers won the NLCS, and Messersmith was one of the main factors in the Dodgers' return to the World Series for the first time since 1966. The Dodgers lost the 1974 World Series to the Oakland A's in five games. Messersmith started Game 1, giving up only two earned runs, but the Dodgers lost 3–2. The key hit was a double by opposing pitcher Ken Holtzman (while Messersmith himself had two base hits in the game). The decisive play, however, was a throwing error by Dodgers' third baseman Ron Cey, that allowed the A's winning third run to score. He was also the losing pitcher in Game 4.

Messersmith pitched 1975 without a contract, subject only to MLB's reserve clause. He had a 19–14 record, with a career best year in ERA, games played, games started, complete games, shutouts, and innings pitched. He led the National League in games started (40), innings pitched (321.2), complete games (19), shutouts (7), and base hits per nine innings (6.8), finishing second best in ERA with 2.29 (behind Randy Jones's 2.24). Messersmith won his second Gold Glove as the league's best-fielding pitcher. He was again selected to the NL All-Star team, was tied for fifth in the NL Cy Young Award voting and tied for 24th in the NL most valuable player vote.

==== Advent of free agency ====
Messersmith is most famous for his role in the historic 1975 Seitz decision, which led to the downfall of Major League Baseball's reserve clause and ushered in the current era of free agency. It began when Messersmith went to spring training in 1975 and began negotiating his 1975 contract. He asked for a no-trade clause, which the Dodgers refused. He refused to sign any contract and played the year subject to MLB's one-year reserve clause, after which he intended to seek free agency. According to author John Helyar, in The Lords of the Realm, Messersmith was also deeply offended by general manager Al Campanis "inject(ing) a personal issue" into the talks (it "cut so deeply with him", Helyar has written, that Messersmith since has never disclosed it), and the pitcher refused to deal with anyone lower than team president Peter O'Malley.

Messersmith and Dave McNally were the only two players in 1975 playing on the one-year reserve clause in effect at the time. McNally's season ended early due to injuries and he returned home, intending to retire, but agreeing to players' union director Marvin Miller's request that he sign onto the Messersmith grievance in case Messersmith ended up signing a new deal with the Dodgers before the season ended.

"It was less of an economic issue at the time than a fight for the right to have control over your own destiny", Messersmith told The Sporting News, looking back on his decision a decade later. "It was a matter of being tired of going in to negotiate a contract and hearing the owners say, 'OK, here's what you're getting. Tough luck'."

==== Final playing years ====
Messersmith and McNally won their case before arbitrator Peter Seitz, who was fired by the owners the day afterward. McNally followed through on his intention to retire, but Messersmith signed a three-year, $1 million deal with the Atlanta Braves. Among other things, then-Braves owner Ted Turner suggested the nickname "Channel" for Messersmith and jersey number 17, in order to promote the television station that aired Braves games. National League President Chub Feeney quickly nixed the idea, in part using the argument it could be construed as improper advertising.

The Braves were a last place team in 1976. Messersmith was 11–11 with a 3.04 ERA, and again was selected to the All-Star team. However, he started 12 fewer games and pitched in over 100 less innings than the preceding season. He suffered an elbow injury in 1977, and started only 16 games, pitching only a little more than 100 innings, with a 5–4 record.

Messersmith struggled trying to live up to his new contract which was sold to the New York Yankees for $100,000 at the Winter Meetings on December 8, 1977. Messersmith was injured early in the 1978 season with a shoulder separation, and played in only six games for the Yankees in 1978. The Yankees released him after the 1978 season (November 6, 1978) and he signed with the Dodgers (February 7, 1979).

The Dodgers gave Messersmith the very thing their first refusal drove him toward testing and defeating the old reserve system: a no-trade clause. But the injuries and stress had taken too much toll; Messersmith pitched in only 11 games for the Dodgers in 1979, going 2–4 with a 4.90 ERA, and retired after the Dodgers released him on August 28.

=== Legacy ===
Over his 12-year major league career, Messersmith was 130–99, with a 2.86 ERA. After pitching 321.2 innings in 1975, he pitched fewer than 395 total innings over the next four years, and had ongoing arm troubles. Messersmith's lifetime 2.861 ERA is the fifth lowest among full-time starting pitchers whose careers began after the advent of the live-ball era in 1920, behind only Clayton Kershaw (2.50), Whitey Ford (2.75), Sandy Koufax (2.76), and Jim Palmer (2.856). (Hoyt Wilhelm has been listed above him, but only started 52 of his 1,070 games pitched.)

=== Coaching ===
Messersmith served two stints as a baseball coach at Cabrillo College, from 1986 to 1991 and from 2005 to 2007, when he retired at age 63.

== Career statistics ==
Years	Win	Loss	Pct	ERA	G	GS	GF	CG	SHO	SV	IP	H	R	ER	BB	SO	HBP	BK	WP	H/9	WHIP
12	130	99	.568	2.86	344	295	30	98	27	14	2230.1	1719	812	709	831	1625	40	7	70	6.9	1.143

== See also ==
- List of Major League Baseball annual wins leaders

== Bibliography ==
- John Helyar, The Lords of the Realm: The Real History of Baseball. (New York: Villard/Random House, 1994.)
