= 1974 Baltimore Orioles season =

Major League Baseball season

1974 Baltimore Orioles
- American League East champions
- League: American League
- Division: East
- Ballpark: Memorial Stadium
- City: Baltimore, Maryland
- Record: 91–71 (.562)
- Divisional place: 1st
- Owners: Jerold Hoffberger
- General managers: Frank Cashen
- Managers: Earl Weaver
- Television: WJZ-TV
- Radio: WBAL (AM) (Chuck Thompson, Bill O'Donnell)

The 1974 Baltimore Orioles season was the 74th season in Baltimore Orioles franchise history, the 21st in Baltimore, and the 21st at Memorial Stadium. The Orioles finished first in the American League East with a record of 91 wins and 71 losses. The Orioles went on to lose to the Oakland Athletics in the 1974 American League Championship Series, 3 games to 1.

The Orioles went 27–6 after being in fourth place and trailing the Boston Red Sox by eight games on August 29. They won 16 of their last 18 matches and ended the campaign with a nine-game winning streak. They moved into first place on September 19 and clinched its fifth AL East title in six years on the penultimate night of the regular season on October 1.

The Orioles had a net operating income of $82,000.

== Offseason ==
- December 4, 1973: Merv Rettenmund, Junior Kennedy and Bill Wood (minors) were traded by the Orioles to the Cincinnati Reds for Ross Grimsley and Wally Williams (minors).
- December 10, 1973: Dennis Martínez was signed by the Baltimore Orioles as an amateur free agent.

== Regular season ==
Much of the success of the team can be attributed to its infield. Second baseman Bobby Grich, shortstop Mark Belanger and third baseman Brooks Robinson each led the American League for their positions in assists.

=== Season standings ===
AL East
| Team | W | L | Pct. | GB | Home | Road |
|---|---|---|---|---|---|---|
| Baltimore Orioles | 91 | 71 | .562 | — | 46‍–‍35 | 45‍–‍36 |
| New York Yankees | 89 | 73 | .549 | 2 | 47‍–‍34 | 42‍–‍39 |
| Boston Red Sox | 84 | 78 | .519 | 7 | 46‍–‍35 | 38‍–‍43 |
| Cleveland Indians | 77 | 85 | .475 | 14 | 40‍–‍41 | 37‍–‍44 |
| Milwaukee Brewers | 76 | 86 | .469 | 15 | 40‍–‍41 | 36‍–‍45 |
| Detroit Tigers | 72 | 90 | .444 | 19 | 36‍–‍45 | 36‍–‍45 |

=== Record vs. opponents ===
1974 American League record Sources:
| Team | BAL | BOS | CAL | CWS | CLE | DET | KC | MIL | MIN | NYY | OAK | TEX |
|---|---|---|---|---|---|---|---|---|---|---|---|---|
| Baltimore | — | 10–8 | 7–5 | 5–7 | 12–6 | 14–4 | 8–4 | 8–10 | 6–6 | 11–7 | 6–6 | 4–8 |
| Boston | 8–10 | — | 4–8 | 8–4 | 9–9 | 11–7 | 4–8 | 10–8 | 6–6 | 11–7 | 8–4 | 5–7 |
| California | 5–7 | 8–4 | — | 10–8–1 | 3–9 | 5–7 | 8–10 | 3–9 | 8–10 | 3–9 | 6–12 | 9–9 |
| Chicago | 7–5 | 4–8 | 8–10–1 | — | 8–4 | 7–5 | 11–7 | 8–4 | 7–11–1 | 4–8 | 7–11 | 9–7–1 |
| Cleveland | 6–12 | 9–9 | 9–3 | 4–8 | — | 9–9 | 8–4 | 10–8 | 6–6 | 7–11 | 5–7 | 4–8 |
| Detroit | 4–14 | 7–11 | 7–5 | 5–7 | 9–9 | — | 7–5 | 9–9 | 3–9 | 11–7 | 5–7 | 5–7 |
| Kansas City | 4–8 | 8–4 | 10–8 | 7–11 | 4–8 | 5–7 | — | 11–1 | 8–10 | 4–8 | 8–10 | 8–10 |
| Milwaukee | 10–8 | 8–10 | 9–3 | 4–8 | 8–10 | 9–9 | 1–11 | — | 6–6 | 9–9 | 5–7 | 7–5 |
| Minnesota | 6–6 | 6–6 | 10–8 | 11–7–1 | 6–6 | 9–3 | 10–8 | 6–6 | — | 4–8 | 5–13 | 9–9 |
| New York | 7–11 | 7–11 | 9–3 | 8–4 | 11–7 | 7–11 | 8–4 | 9–9 | 8–4 | — | 7–5 | 8–4 |
| Oakland | 6–6 | 4–8 | 12–6 | 11–7 | 7–5 | 7–5 | 10–8 | 7–5 | 13–5 | 5–7 | — | 8–10 |
| Texas | 8–4 | 7–5 | 9–9 | 7–9–1 | 8–4 | 7–5 | 10–8 | 5–7 | 9–9 | 4–8 | 10–8 | — |

=== Notable transactions ===
- June 5, 1974: Rich Dauer was drafted by the Orioles in the 1st round (24th pick) of the 1974 Major League Baseball draft.
- September 11, 1974: The Orioles traded a player to be named later and cash to the California Angels for Bob Oliver. The Orioles completed the trade by sending Mickey Scott to the Angels on October 3.
- September 16, 1974: Jim Northrup was purchased by the Orioles from the Montreal Expos.

=== Roster ===
1974 Baltimore Orioles
Roster
| Pitchers: 13 Doyle Alexander; 35 Mike Cuellar; 17 Wayne Garland; 39 Ross Grimsley; 44 Don Hood; 23 Grant Jackson; 38 Jesse Jefferson; 45 Dave Johnson; 19 Dave McNally; 22 Jim Palmer; 34 Bob Reynolds | Catchers: 8 Andy Etchebarren; 10 Elrod Hendricks; 32 Earl Williams; Infielders: 15 Frank Baker; 7 Mark Belanger; 24 Enos Cabell; 37 Doug DeCinces; 3 Bobby Grich; 43 Tim Nordbrook; 33 Bob Oliver; 26 Boog Powell; 5 Brooks Robinson | Outfielders: 25 Don Baylor; 6 Paul Blair; 1 Al Bumbry; 2 Rich Coggins; 18 Jim Fuller; 21 Curt Motton; 28 Jim Northrup; 9 Mike Reinbach; Other batters: 12 Tommy Davis | Manager: 4 Earl Weaver; Coaches: 31 George Bamberger; 41 Jim Frey; 55 Billy Hunter; 48 George Staller |

== Player stats ==
| = Indicates team leader |

=== Batting ===
==== Starters by position ====
Note: Pos = Position; G = Games played; AB = At bats; H = Hits; Avg. = Batting average; HR = Home runs; RBI = Runs batted in

| Pos | Player | G | AB | H | Avg. | HR | RBI |
|---|---|---|---|---|---|---|---|
| C | Earl Williams | 118 | 413 | 105 | .254 | 14 | 52 |
| 1B | Boog Powell | 110 | 344 | 91 | .265 | 12 | 45 |
| 2B | Bobby Grich | 160 | 582 | 153 | .263 | 19 | 82 |
| 3B | Brooks Robinson | 153 | 553 | 159 | .288 | 7 | 59 |
| SS | Mark Belanger | 155 | 493 | 111 | .225 | 5 | 36 |
| LF | Don Baylor | 137 | 489 | 133 | .272 | 10 | 59 |
| CF | Paul Blair | 151 | 552 | 144 | .261 | 17 | 62 |
| RF | Rich Coggins | 113 | 411 | 100 | .243 | 4 | 32 |
| DH | Tommy Davis | 128 | 626 | 181 | .289 | 11 | 84 |

==== Other batters ====
Note: G = Games played; AB = At bats; H = Hits; Avg. = Batting average; HR = Home runs; RBI = Runs batted in

| Player | G | AB | H | Avg. | HR | RBI |
|---|---|---|---|---|---|---|
| Al Bumbry | 94 | 270 | 63 | .233 | 1 | 19 |
| Jim Fuller | 64 | 189 | 42 | .222 | 7 | 28 |
| Andy Etchebarren | 62 | 180 | 40 | .222 | 2 | 15 |
| Enos Cabell | 80 | 174 | 42 | .241 | 3 | 17 |
| Elrod Hendricks | 66 | 159 | 33 | .208 | 3 | 8 |
| Frank Baker | 24 | 29 | 5 | .172 | 0 | 0 |
| Mike Reinbach | 12 | 20 | 5 | .250 | 0 | 2 |
| Bob Oliver | 9 | 20 | 3 | .150 | 0 | 4 |
| Tim Nordbrook | 6 | 15 | 4 | .267 | 0 | 1 |
| Curt Motton | 7 | 8 | 0 | .000 | 0 | 0 |
| Jim Northrup | 8 | 7 | 4 | .571 | 1 | 3 |
| Doug DeCinces | 1 | 1 | 0 | .000 | 0 | 0 |

=== Pitching ===
==== Starting pitchers ====
Note: G = Games pitched; IP = Innings pitched; W = Wins; L = Losses; ERA = Earned run average; SO = Strikeouts

| Player | G | IP | W | L | ERA | SO |
|---|---|---|---|---|---|---|
| Ross Grimsley | 40 | 295.2 | 18 | 13 | 3.07 | 158 |
| Mike Cuellar | 38 | 269.1 | 22 | 10 | 3.11 | 106 |
| Dave McNally | 39 | 259.0 | 16 | 10 | 3.58 | 111 |
| Jim Palmer | 26 | 178.2 | 7 | 12 | 3.27 | 84 |

==== Other pitchers ====
Note: G = Games pitched; IP = Innings pitched; W = Wins; L = Losses; ERA = Earned run average; SO = Strikeouts

| Player | G | IP | W | L | ERA | SO |
|---|---|---|---|---|---|---|
| Doyle Alexander | 30 | 114.1 | 6 | 9 | 4.01 | 40 |
| Wayne Garland | 20 | 91.0 | 5 | 5 | 2.97 | 40 |

==== Relief pitchers ====
Note: G = Games pitched; W = Wins; L = Losses; SV = Saves; ERA = Earned run average; SO = Strikeouts

| Player | G | W | L | SV | ERA | SO |
|---|---|---|---|---|---|---|
| Grant Jackson | 49 | 6 | 4 | 12 | 2.57 | 56 |
| Bob Reynolds | 54 | 7 | 5 | 7 | 2.73 | 43 |
| Don Hood | 20 | 1 | 1 | 1 | 3.45 | 26 |
| Jesse Jefferson | 20 | 1 | 0 | 0 | 4.40 | 31 |
| Dave Johnson | 11 | 2 | 2 | 2 | 2.93 | 6 |

== Postseason ==
=== ALCS ===
The Athletics defeated the Orioles, 3–1, limiting Baltimore to one run in the final three games.

| Game | Score | Date | Location | Attendance |
|---|---|---|---|---|
| 1 | Baltimore – 6, Oakland – 3 | October 5 | Oakland Coliseum | 41,609 |
| 2 | Baltimore – 0, Oakland – 5 | October 6 | Oakland Coliseum | 42,810 |
| 3 | Oakland – 1, Baltimore – 0 | October 8 | Memorial Stadium | 32,060 |
| 4 | Oakland – 2, Baltimore – 1 | October 9 | Memorial Stadium | 28,136 |

- As division champions, the Orioles earned a postseason bonus of $7,394 each.

== Farm system ==
| Level | Team | League | Manager |
|---|---|---|---|
| AAA | Rochester Red Wings | International League | Joe Altobelli |
| AA | Asheville Orioles | Southern League | Cal Ripken Sr. |
| A | Lodi Orioles | California League | Jimmie Schaffer |
| A | Miami Orioles | Florida State League | George Farson |
| Rookie | Bluefield Orioles | Appalachian League | Bobby Malkmus |

LEAGUE CHAMPIONS: Rochester
