= Doug Rau =

American baseball player (born 1948)

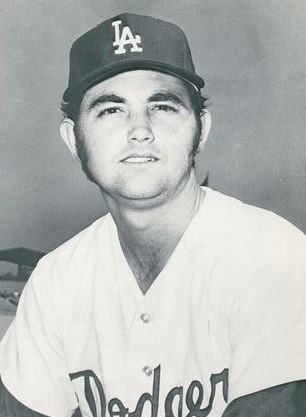
- Pitcher
- Born: December 15, 1948 (age 77); Columbus, Texas, U.S.
- Batted: Left Threw: Left

MLB debut
- September 2, 1972, for the Los Angeles Dodgers

Last MLB appearance
- May 26, 1981, for the California Angels

MLB statistics
- Win–loss record: 81–60
- Earned run average: 3.35
- Strikeouts: 697
- Stats at Baseball Reference

Teams
- Los Angeles Dodgers (1972–1979); California Angels (1981)

Douglas James Rau (born December 15, 1948), is an American former professional baseball player who pitched in the Major Leagues from 1972 to 1981. Rau attended Texas A&M University, and was a first-round draft pick of the Dodgers in the secondary phase of the June 1970 amateur draft. He played almost exclusively for the Dodgers in his major league career.

Rau broke in with the Dodgers in 1972, earning a 2.20 ERA in 32 2/3 innings and giving up just 18 hits. In 1974, Rau became a starter and they won the NL pennant. His record was 13-11. In 1975, he went 15-9 with a 3.11 ERA. In 1976, he finished with a record of 16-12 and a 2.57 ERA, second in the National League.

In 1977 and 1978, Dodgers won the pennant again and Rau was a mainstay in the starting rotation. In 1977 he went 14-8, with a winning percentage of .636, while in 1978 he went 15-9 with a winning percentage of .625. In the 1977 World Series he did not pitch effectively, but in the 1978 World Series he gave up no runs in 2 innings pitched.

Rau's career was close to an end, though, because of injury problems. In 1979, he pitched in only 11 games, with a record of 1-5, and had rotator cuff surgery. He was not in the majors in 1980, and when he came back in 1981 with the California Angels, he appeared in only 3 games, going 1-2.

Rau was involved in an argument during Game 4 of the 1977 World Series with manager Tommy Lasorda. After Rau gave up 2 doubles, a single and one run to start the 2nd inning, Lasorda went to the mound to remove him from the game; the two men then got into a profanity-filled argument on the mound in which team captain Davey Lopes tried to calm them down. The argument was recorded on Lasorda's microphone.
