= Joe Rudi =

American baseball player (born 1946)

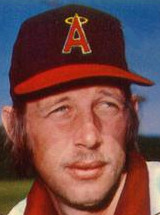
- Left fielder
- Born: September 7, 1946 (age 80); Modesto, California, U.S.
- Batted: Right Threw: Right

MLB debut
- April 11, 1967, for the Kansas City Athletics

Last MLB appearance
- October 3, 1982, for the Oakland Athletics

MLB statistics
- Batting average: .264
- Home runs: 179
- Runs batted in: 810
- Stats at Baseball Reference

Teams
- Kansas City / Oakland Athletics (1967–1976); California Angels (1977–1980); Boston Red Sox (1981); Oakland Athletics (1982)

Career highlights and awards
- 3× All-Star (1972, 1974, 1975); 3× World Series champion (1972–1974); 3× Gold Glove Award (1974–1976); Athletics Hall of Fame

Joseph Oden Rudi (born September 7, 1946) is an American former professional baseball player. He played in Major League Baseball as a left fielder between 1967 and 1982, most prominently as an integral member of the Oakland Athletics dynasty that won three consecutive World Series championships between 1972 and 1974.

A three-time All-Star, Rudi excelled as an offensive and as a defensive player, winning three Gold Glove Awards and was the 1972 American League leader in hits with 181. He also played for the California Angels and the Boston Red Sox. In 2022, Rudi was inducted into the Athletics Hall of Fame.

== Early life ==
Rudi was born in Modesto, California. He graduated from Thomas Downey High School in Modesto.

== Playing career ==
1970 card of Rudi posing for Oakland Athletics

Rudi batted a career-high .309 in 1970 and led the American League a career-high 181 hits in 1972. He finished second in American League MVP voting behind Dick Allen. That year, he helped the Athletics win the World Series and made a great game-saving catch in Game 2 that went on to become part of the highlight reel for many Major League Baseball films. With Tony Pérez on first and Oakland leading 2–0 in the ninth inning, Rudi raced to the left-field fence and made a leaping, backhanded catch of Denis Menke's smash to save a run. Earlier in the game, Rudi hit a solo home run. He also caught Pete Rose's fly ball for the final out of the Series.

In 1974 he had a career best 22 home runs and 99 runs batted in while leading the American League with 287 total bases. He was also awarded his first career Gold Glove Award and was once again the runner-up in AL MVP voting behind Jeff Burroughs. Rudi hit a home run in Game 5 of the 1974 World Series off Mike Marshall that would turn out to be the game winner and Series clincher. Rudi's Athletics became the first team since the 1949–1953 New York Yankees to win three straight World Series titles.

In 1975, he was elected by the fans as a starter in the All-Star Game as an outfielder, where he joined four other Oakland A's in the American League starting lineup. He also played some first base for the A's in 1975.

With baseball entering the free agency era, A's owner Charlie Finley attempted to sell Rudi and pitcher Rollie Fingers to the Boston Red Sox for $1 million each at the MLB trade deadline on June 15, 1976, rather than trading them (as he had done with Reggie Jackson and Ken Holtzman prior to that season) or risking losing them in free agency. Rudi actually reported to the Red Sox and was issued a uniform, but never was permitted to play, as baseball Commissioner Bowie Kuhn voided the transaction as not being in the best interests of baseball. Rudi later played for Boston in 1981.

Rudi, along with Don Baylor, ended up leaving the A's as a free agent and signed with the California Angels for the 1977 season. However, Rudi's tenure with the Angels was mostly injury-plagued, even though he posted respectable home run and RBI totals in his four seasons. His best year with the Angels was 1978, when he played in 133 games and hit .256 with 17 home runs and 79 RBIs. He missed the Angels' 1979 post-season run with injury. After the 1980 season, Rudi was traded by the Angels along with Frank Tanana to the Red Sox for Fred Lynn. After one injury-filled season, he closed his career back with the A's in 1982 and hit a home run in his last professional at-bat.

In a sixteen-year major league career, Rudi played in 1,547 games, compiling a .264 batting average (1,468-for-5,556) with 684 runs scored, 287 doubles, 39 triples, 179 home runs, 810 RBI and 369 walks. His on-base percentage was .311 and slugging percentage was .427. Strong defensively, he recorded a career .991 fielding percentage at all three outfield positions. In 38 post-season games, covering five American League Championship Series and three World Series from 1971 to 1975, he handled 124 total chances (120 putouts, 4 assists) without an error.

Rudi is retired and lives with his wife Sharon, in The Villages, Florida. He is a long-time amateur radio operator with the call sign NK7U.

== See also ==
- List of Major League Baseball annual doubles leaders
- List of Major League Baseball annual triples leaders
