= Mike Marshall (pitcher) =

American baseball player (1943–2021)

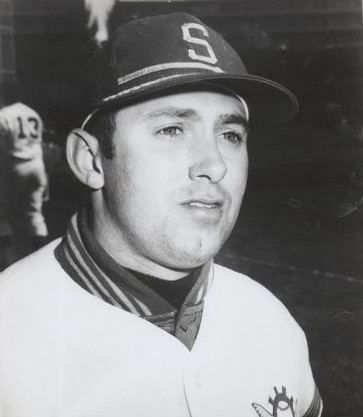
- Marshall in 1969
- Pitcher
- Born: January 15, 1943; Adrian, Michigan, U.S.
- Died: May 31, 2021 (aged 78); Zephyrhills, Florida, U.S.
- Batted: Right Threw: Right

MLB debut
- May 31, 1967, for the Detroit Tigers

Last MLB appearance
- October 2, 1981, for the New York Mets

MLB statistics
- Win–loss record: 97–112
- Earned run average: 3.14
- Strikeouts: 880
- Saves: 188
- Stats at Baseball Reference

Teams
- Detroit Tigers (1967); Seattle Pilots (1969); Houston Astros (1970); Montreal Expos (1970–1973); Los Angeles Dodgers (1974–1976); Atlanta Braves (1976–1977); Texas Rangers (1977); Minnesota Twins (1978–1980); New York Mets (1981)

Career highlights and awards
- 2× All-Star (1974, 1975); NL Cy Young Award (1974); 3× Saves leader (1973, 1974, 1979); MLB record 106 games pitched, single season

Michael Grant Marshall (January 15, 1943 – May 31, 2021) was an American professional baseball pitcher. He played in Major League Baseball (MLB) in 1967 and from 1969 through 1981 for nine different teams. Marshall won the National League Cy Young Award in 1974 as a Los Angeles Dodger and was a two-time All-Star selection. He was the first relief pitcher to receive the Cy Young Award.

In 1974, Marshall set a record for the most games pitched in a season, with 106.

== Early life ==
Marshall was born in Adrian, Michigan, on January 15, 1943. He attended Adrian High School in his hometown, before studying at Michigan State University. He was signed as an amateur free agent by the Philadelphia Phillies on September 13, 1960.

== Career ==
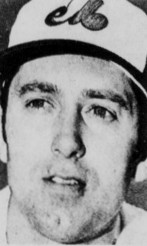
Marshall with the Montreal Expos in 1973

Marshall did not pitch professionally until 1965 in the minor leagues. Marshall was purchased by the Detroit Tigers in 1966. He made his Major League debut with the Tigers on May 31, 1967, pitching one inning against the Cleveland Indians. He made 37 relief appearances for the Tigers that season, going 1–3 with 10 saves and had a 1.98 earned run average (ERA). But the Tigers sent him back to the minors for 1968, and he was drafted by the Seattle Pilots with the 53rd pick in the 1968 Major League Baseball expansion draft.

The Pilots used Marshall mainly as a starter in his only season there, as he went 3–10 with a 5.13 ERA in 20 games (14 starts). His contract was purchased by the Houston Astros after the season and then traded to the Montreal Expos on June 23, 1970. He began to flourish with Montreal, posting an impressive 1.78 ERA in 1972 and proceeded to lead the National League in both saves and games pitched in 1973.

Marshall was traded from the Expos to the Dodgers for Willie Davis at the Winter Meetings on December 5, 1973. He won the National League Cy Young Award in 1974 as a member of the Dodgers, as well as being named the NL Pitcher of the Year by The Sporting News. During the 1974 season, he set a Major League record for most appearances by a relief pitcher, appearing in 106 games. He was a member of the National League All Star Team in 1974 and 1975. Marshall was also named Fireman of the Year by TSN with three different teams: in the NL in 1973 with the Montreal Expos, in 1974 with the Los Angeles Dodgers, and a third time in 1979 in the American League with the Minnesota Twins (sharing the award with Jim Kern). He was voted the Montreal Expos Player of the Year in 1972 and 1973, and was also an original member of the Seattle Pilots.

Marshall, who relied primarily on an elusive screwball, led his league in games pitched four times, saves three times, and games finished five times. He is the holder of two major league records, both of which he set in the 1974 season: most appearances (games pitched) in a season (106), and most consecutive team games with a relief appearance (13). He also holds the American League record for games pitched in a season with 90 for Minnesota in 1979. His last season was in 1981 with the New York Mets. He posted a 3-2 with a 2.61 ERA in 20 games. He told the Minneapolis Star in January 1982 that it was one of his most satisfying stints in baseball. "Considering that I hadn't pitched in 14 months, I thought I did a good job. When they fired Joe Torre, they fired me."

In his record-setting 1974 season, he pitched 208 1/3 innings, all of which came in relief appearances. Marshall attended Michigan State University, earning three degrees, including a Doctor of Philosophy in exercise physiology. In the months preceding his 1974 Cy Young season, he considered retiring in order to work on his Ph.D. Marshall pitched for the Dodgers that year.

== Personal life ==
Marshall and his first wife, Nancy, had three daughters, Deborah, Rebekah, and Kerry. In 1983, Nancy Marshall authored a book, along with Jim Bouton's wife Bobbie, titled Home Games about their time as baseball wives. His second marriage to Erica Smith-Marshall lasted 32 years.

Marshall earned his Doctor of Philosophy in exercise physiology from Michigan State University in 1978.

Marshall taught and advocated a pitching method he developed that he "believes could completely eradicate pitching-arm injuries." He wanted pitchers to externally rotate early as they swing their arm up. That means the pitcher will lift the hand before the elbow, so that the wrist faces away from the body and up, the hand is above the elbow when the front foot touches the ground, which leads to a smooth transition without a "forearm bounce", as Marshall called it. Marshall believed this causes ulnar collateral ligament injuries, which can necessitate ulnar collateral ligament reconstruction, which is known as "Tommy John surgery". He wanted to first lay back the forearm and then accelerate by rotating the body instead of bending over, in order to protect the elbow against injury.

In September 1982, Marshall was arrested on charges of disorderly conduct and fourth-degree assault stemming from an incident that had occurred outside Marshall's home in Minnetonka, Minnesota. A community dogcatcher alleged that Marshall had used her truck for target practice after she met with him at his house to discuss a black Labrador dog who she believed was his. The dog catcher, Mary Jo Strand, alleged that Marshall had gone into his garage after the discussion, retrieved a baseball and heaved it at her departing vehicle. The ball allegedly struck the top of Strand's truck, landing about two feet from the driver's window. Marshall denied threatening Strand or throwing the ball at her. He also denied that the dog was his. Instead, he asserted that he twice had asked Strand to leave his property and that if she did not do so, he would consider her to be trespassing and would not be responsible "if something happens to your truck", he told the Associated Press.

Marshall taught the screwball to his cousin, Brent Honeywell Sr., who taught it to his son, Brent Honeywell Jr.

Marshall died on May 31, 2021, at his home in Zephyrhills, Florida, where he ran a pitcher training camp. He was 78, and had been receiving hospice care.

== See also ==
- List of Major League Baseball annual saves leaders
- List of Major League Baseball individual streaks
