= Lee Smith (baseball) =

American baseball player (born 1957)

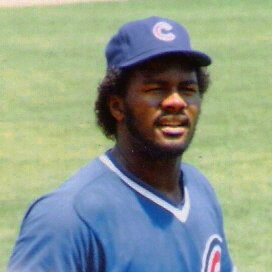
- Smith with the Chicago Cubs in 1985
- Pitcher
- Born: December 4, 1957 (age 68); Jamestown, Louisiana, U.S.
- Batted: Right Threw: Right

MLB debut
- September 1, 1980, for the Chicago Cubs

Last MLB appearance
- July 2, 1997, for the Montreal Expos

MLB statistics
- Win–loss record: 71–92
- Earned run average: 3.03
- Strikeouts: 1,251
- Saves: 478
- Stats at Baseball Reference

Teams
- Chicago Cubs (1980–1987); Boston Red Sox (1988–1990); St. Louis Cardinals (1990–1993); New York Yankees (1993); Baltimore Orioles (1994); California Angels (1995–1996); Cincinnati Reds (1996); Montreal Expos (1997)

Career highlights and awards
- 7× All-Star (1983, 1987, 1991–1995); 3× Rolaids Relief Man Award (1991, 1992, 1994); 4× Saves leader (1983, 1991, 1992, 1994); Chicago Cubs Hall of Fame

Member of the National

Baseball Hall of Fame
- Induction: 2019
- Vote: 100%
- Election method: Today's Game Era Committee

Lee Arthur Smith (born December 4, 1957) is an American former professional baseball player who was a pitcher for 18 years in Major League Baseball (MLB) for eight teams. Serving mostly as a relief pitcher during his career, he was a dominant closer, was the first pitcher to reach 400 saves, and held the major league record for career saves from 1993 until 2006, when Trevor Hoffman passed his total of 478. He was elected to the National Baseball Hall of Fame as part of the class of 2019 by the Today's Game Era Committee.

A native of Jamestown in Bienville Parish in north Louisiana, Smith was scouted by Buck O'Neil and was selected by the Chicago Cubs in the 1975 MLB draft. Smith was an intimidating figure on the pitcher's mound at 6 feet 6 inches (1.98 m) and 265 pounds (120 kg) with a 95-mile-per-hour (150 km/h) fastball. In 1991, he set a National League (NL) record with 47 saves for the St. Louis Cardinals, and was runner-up for the league's Cy Young Award; it was the second of three times Smith led the NL in saves, and he later led the American League (AL) in saves once. When he retired, he held the major league record for career games finished (802) and was third in games pitched (1,022). He holds the Cubs' team record for career saves (180), and held the same record for the Cardinals (160) until 2006. Smith became known for taking his time to reach the mound when called upon, which Smith attributed to a fact he learned that the groundskeepers at Wrigley Field would receive time and a half for games that went past 4:30 p.m.

After his playing career, Smith worked as a pitching instructor in Minor League Baseball for the San Francisco Giants. He served as the pitching coach for the South Africa national baseball team in the World Baseball Classics of 2006 and 2009.

== Early life ==
Smith attended high school in Castor, Louisiana, where his favorite sport was basketball; he did not play on the baseball team until he was a junior. Smith said he began playing only because his brother bet him $10 that he couldn't handle the position of catcher. Negro leagues veteran Buck O'Neil is credited with having scouted him.

== Professional career ==
=== Draft and minor leagues ===
At age 17, Smith was selected in the second round of the 1975 MLB draft by the Chicago Cubs with the 28th overall pick. The Cubs, via O'Neil, were able to get Smith under contract for a $50,000 signing bonus plus $8,000 for his education.

Smith began his professional career as a starting pitcher, first playing in the rookie-level Gulf Coast League in 1975. He played in Class A in 1976 and 1977 with the Pompano Beach Cubs, then in Double-A during 1978 and 1979 with the Midland Cubs. In 1978, Smith struggled with Midland in the Texas League, walking 128 batters in 155 innings pitched. When the team moved him to the bullpen, Smith felt he was being demoted and nearly quit the team; a talk from former Cubs outfielder Billy Williams convinced him to stay. Smith returned to Midland in 1979, lowering his earned run average (ERA) by a full run compared to the prior season (5.98 to 4.93). In 1980, Smith played in Triple-A with the Wichita Aeros of the American Association, recording 15 saves and a 3.70 ERA.

=== Chicago Cubs (1980–1987) ===
Smith made his major league debut with the Cubs, who were struggling to a last-place finish, on September 1, 1980, against the Atlanta Braves. He pitched a scoreless inning and recorded his first MLB strikeout, coming against Glenn Hubbard. Smith made 18 relief appearances through the end of the season, pitching to a 2.91 ERA with a 2–0 record. He returned to the Cubs for the 1981 season, and was used mostly as a middle relief pitcher. His first major league save came on August 29, when he recorded the final five outs of a 3–1 Cubs win over the Los Angeles Dodgers. Smith had an ERA of 3.94 through early June, when the season was interrupted by the 1981 Major League Baseball strike. He finished the season with an ERA of 3.51 and a 3–6 record, coming in 39 relief appearances plus a single start at the end of the season.

During the 1982 season, closing for the Cubs was shared between Smith, Willie Hernández, Bill Campbell and Dick Tidrow, each of whom finished at least 25 games while registering 17, 10, 8, and 6 saves, respectively. Smith also started five games between June 16 and July 5, registering a no decision followed by four consecutive losses. These five starts, along with the start at the end of the 1981 season, were the only six starts that Smith made during his major league career. Smith also collected his first MLB hit, coming on July 5 against Atlanta, a second-inning home run off of Phil Niekro. Smith only collected two additional hits, one each in 1983 and 1984, registering a career batting average of .047 (3-for-64).

Ferguson Jenkins, who had pitched for the Cubs from 1966 to 1973, returned to the Cubs for the final two seasons of his career, 1982 and 1983. Years later, Smith credited Jenkins with simplifying his delivery, introducing him to the slider and forkball, and teaching him how to set up hitters. Smith subsequently led the Cubs in games finished and saves for each of the 1983 through 1987 seasons.

During his first 10 appearances of 1983, Smith allowed no runs while allowing only three hits and striking out 12 batters in 12 2/3 innings pitched; his ERA was not above 1.85 at any point during the year. His overall 1.65 ERA for the season proved to be the lowest of his major league career, nearly two runs better than the NL average of 3.63, and he also posted a career-best 1.074 WHIP. He led the NL with 29 saves and 56 games finished. Smith was selected to his first All-Star Game, allowing two runs (one earned) on two hits in an inning of work as his NL team lost the 1983 mid-summer classic to the AL, 13–3. Smith received a point in the NL's Cy Young Award voting and eight points in the NL Most Valuable Player Award voting.

The 1984 Cubs made the franchise's first postseason appearance since 1945, and were the first of only two playoff teams that Smith played for (the other being the 1988 Red Sox). Smith saved more than 30 games for the first time in his career, but compiled a 3.65 ERA, his worst of the decade. In the postseason, he appeared in two games of the NL Championship Series. In Game 2, Smith earned the save in a 4–2 Cubs win by recording the final two outs. The win gave the Cubs a two-games-to-none lead in the best-of-five series, but the San Diego Padres won the next three games to deny the Cubs a berth in the 1984 World Series. Smith took the loss in Game 4: entering in the bottom of the eighth with the game tied, 5–5, he allowed one hit and kept the game tied; in the bottom of the ninth, he allowed a one-out single to Tony Gwynn, followed by a two-run walk-off home run by Steve Garvey to force a deciding fifth game. Smith did not pitch in Game 5, and San Diego won the final game of the series with a score of 6–3.

In 1985, Smith for the first time dominated the league in strikeouts as a relief pitcher. After averaging fewer than eight strikeouts per nine innings in each prior season, he improved to 10.32 in 1985. He finished the season with a career-high 112 strikeouts in only 97 2/3 innings pitched. Smith saved more than 30 games while the Cubs had losing records in 1985, 1986 and 1987. In 1987, he was chosen for his second All-Star Game. When the midsummer classic went into extra innings, Smith pitched the 10th, 11th and 12th innings, striking out four and getting credit for the win when the NL scored the only two runs of the game in the 13th. With his 30th save in 1987, Smith became only the second pitcher (joining Dan Quisenberry) to reach the mark in four consecutive seasons. One player told writers Bruce Nash and Allan Zullo for their book, Baseball Confidential, that one of the most daunting sights in the majors was Smith throwing "pure gas from out of the shadows" of Wrigley Field, which did not have lights at the time.

Despite his numbers, rumors were swirling about his weight and its effect on his knees, and his request for a trade out of Chicago. On December 8, Smith, the team's career leader in saves, was traded to the Boston Red Sox for pitchers Al Nipper and Calvin Schiraldi. While Smith registered nearly 300 saves after the trade, Nipper only pitched in 31 more major-league games, while Schiraldi was out of baseball before age 30.

=== Boston Red Sox (1988–1990) ===
The Boston Red Sox finished the 1987 season with a losing record, at 78–84. One of the main problems was a weak bullpen, leading to Boston's acquisition of Smith in December 1987. Despite giving up a game-winning home run in his 1988 Opening Day debut at Fenway Park, Smith posted an ERA of 2.80 in 64 regular season appearances, his lowest ERA since 1983 (1.65). The Red Sox finished first in the American League East division with a regular season record of 89–73. In Smith's second (and final) appearance in the postseason, he made two appearances in the AL Championship Series. Against the Oakland Athletics, he was the losing pitcher in Game 2, allowing the winning run via three ninth-inning singles. In Game 4, with Boston down three games to none and trailing 2–1, Smith allowed two insurance runs in the eighth inning as Oakland completed the series sweep.

Entering 1989, Smith's salary rose to $1.425 million. His ERA for the season was 3.57, his highest since 1984 (3.65), and he only pitched 70 2/3 innings, his lowest total since 1981 (60 1/3). He recorded a career-high of 12.2 strikeouts per nine innings. The Red Sox finished at 83–79, third place in their division.

For the 1980s, Smith recorded 234 saves in 580 MLB relief appearances, with an ERA of 2.95. Smith and Jeff Reardon are considered to be among the top relievers of the decade, with Reardon recording 264 saves in 507 relief appearances with a 3.06 ERA for the decade. In December 1989, the Red Sox signed free agent Reardon to a three-year, $6.8 million contract. During the first month of the 1990 season, both Smith and Reardon pitched for the Red Sox, with Smith earning four saves and Reardon earning one. On May 4, the Red Sox chose to bolster their offense and traded Smith to the St. Louis Cardinals for outfielder Tom Brunansky. Overall in his two-plus seasons in Boston, Smith had appeared in 139 games while collecting 58 saves; in 168 2/3 innings pitched he struck out 209 batters.

=== St. Louis Cardinals (1990–1993) ===
Smith made his St. Louis debut on May 6, 1990, allowing two runs on three hits in an inning of work during a 5–1 loss. He made 53 appearances with the 1990 Cardinals, registering 27 saves with a 2.10 ERA while striking out 70 batters in 68 2/3 innings. He also had a stretch of 16 consecutive appearances without allowing a run, spanning late June to early August. The team, however, finished at 70–92 and in last place.

In 1991, St. Louis improved to 84–78, while Smith recorded a career-high 47 saves. He surpassed the National League record for saves on October 1, previously held by Bruce Sutter and set in 1984 when Sutter also played for the Cardinals. With Smith's salary roughly doubled to nearly $2.8 million, this was the first of four consecutive seasons during which he had over 40 saves. Smith won his first Rolaids Relief Man Award, received the most significant consideration for league MVP in his career (finishing eighth in NL MVP voting), and finished second in Cy Young Award voting behind Tom Glavine.

Smith again led the NL in saves in 1992, registering 43. In 70 appearances, he struck out 60 batters in 75 innings, while recording a 3.12 ERA; he also won his second Rolaids Relief Man Award. In a game on September 23, 1992, Smith committed an error; he had last committed an error in a National League game on June 30, 1982, while with the Cubs. This span of 546 appearances was the NL record for consecutive errorless games by a pitcher until broken by Heath Bell in 2013.

In 1993, Smith passed Jeff Reardon in MLB career saves on April 13 with save number 358, and passed Bruce Sutter on April 14 for the National League's career saves record, recording NL save number 301, compiled with the Cubs and Cardinals. In June, Smith had 15 saves, which set an MLB record for the most saves in any month. On August 31, with St. Louis 10 games behind the Philadelphia Phillies, seemingly out of contention, and with Smith poised to become a free agent after the season, the Cardinals traded Smith to the Yankees for reliever Rich Batchelor. With St. Louis, Smith recorded 43 saves in 55 appearances during 1993, striking out 49 batters in 50 innings, albeit with a 4.50 ERA. He left the Cardinals as their all-time save leader (160) until Jason Isringhausen passed him on June 13, 2006. Smith's NL single-season record of 47 saves was bested by both Rod Beck of the San Francisco Giants and Randy Myers of the Cubs two years later, with 48 and 53 saves respectively.

=== New York Yankees (1993) ===
The Yankees were just 1 1/2 games behind the Toronto Blue Jays when they acquired Smith. In eight appearances for the Yankees, Smith did not allow any runs and picked up three saves and 11 strikeouts in eight innings pitched. The team went 11–15 during September as Toronto won the division by seven games. Smith filed for free agency after the season.

=== Baltimore Orioles (1994) ===
Smith signed with the Baltimore Orioles for the 1994 season for $1.5 million plus incentives. At age 36, he had his most successful season; in his first 12 games, he had 12 saves and a 0.00 ERA. After nearly two months, his ERA was under 1.00 and it was still under 2.00 in mid-July. Smith was selected for the All-Star Game in 1991, 1992, and 1993, but had not played. The 1994 All-Star Game was his sixth selection, and he was brought into the game to hold a two-run American League lead in the ninth inning. Instead, he gave up a game-tying two-run home run to Fred McGriff, and the AL lost in 10 innings. Smith's bad streak continued for the next several weeks until the 1994–95 Major League Baseball strike ended the season. In the strike-shortened campaign, Smith recorded 33 saves with a 3.29 ERA and captured his third (and final) Rolaids Relief Man Award.

=== California Angels (1995–1996) ===
After filing for free agency again, Smith signed a two-year contract with the California Angels for over $2.5 million while the strike was still in progress. In 1995, Smith registered a save in every appearance from April 28 to June 25. On June 11, he saved his 16th consecutive game to break the major league record set by Doug Jones in 1988. He ran his streak to 19 games before losing a save game on June 28; Smith's record was broken by John Wetteland, who saved 24 straight the next year. After keeping his ERA at 0.00 through the first two months of the season, Smith was selected to his seventh and final All-Star Game, thereby becoming the fourth player to be an All-Star for four different teams (after Walker Cooper, George Kell and Goose Gossage). Smith did not fare well for the next month, pushing his ERA up to 5.40. The Angels held a double-digit lead in the division and seemed poised for the postseason. However, the Angels went 14–29 in their final 43 games to finish in a tie with the Seattle Mariners atop the AL West, then lost the tie-breaker game to miss the playoffs. Despite the team's difficulties, Smith pitched effectively during August and September, registering 13 saves against a single blown save. He finished the season with 37 saves and an ERA more than a run lower than the AL average (3.47 vs. 4.71).

Early in the 1996 season, Smith spent time on the disabled list following offseason surgery—he had torn a tendon in his right knee while on a hunting trip—and second-year pitcher Troy Percival established himself as the Angels' closer. Smith was briefly with the Lake Elsinore Storm on a rehabilitation assignment, his first time in the minor leagues since 1980. Upon his return to the Angels, Smith was unhappy with an inconsistent role, commenting, "I could write a movie about the past few weeks... but it would have to be a cartoon." He pitched in a total of 11 games for the Angels during April and May, then was traded to the Cincinnati Reds.

=== Cincinnati Reds (1996) ===
Smith was traded to the Cincinnati Reds in exchange for reliever Chuck McElroy on May 27, 1996. Smith assumed setup duty for the Reds as closer Jeff Brantley was en route to a career-high 44 saves. In his return to the National League, Smith appeared in 43 games and registered two saves; his ERA with the Reds (4.06) was nearly as high as the league average (4.21), while for the full season he logged 6.7 strikeouts per nine innings pitched, the lowest to that point in his career. The Reds granted him free agency after the season.

=== Montreal Expos (1997) ===
Smith was picked up by the Montreal Expos for 1997 on a $400,000 contract. This was Smith's final season of his career. His last game of the season, and his career, was two innings of extra-innings relief during an interleague rivalry game won by Toronto on July 2. After posting career-worsts in ERA (5.82), hits per nine innings (11.63) and several other statistics, Smith announced his retirement on July 15. Smith was formally released by the Expos on September 25, 1997.

=== Post-playing career ===
Despite his retirement announcement, the Kansas City Royals signed Smith as a free agent and invited him to spring training for 1998. In late March, he refused a minor-league assignment and left training camp. In early June, he signed a minor-league deal with the Houston Astros, appearing in two Double-A games with the Jackson Generals and 10 Triple-A games with the New Orleans Zephyrs. After posting an ERA near 7.00 in Triple-A, he was released at the end of June, and retired again. Over the course of his career in the major leagues, Smith appeared in 1,022 games, accruing a 71–92 win–loss record to go along with his 478 saves. His career ERA was 3.03, and he struck out 1,251 batters.

== Post-retirement ==
Two years after his retirement in 1998, Smith went to work as a roving minor league pitching instructor for the San Francisco Giants. Giants director of player personnel, former teammate Dick Tidrow, along with the manager of the Double-A Shreveport Captains, Jack Hiatt, offered the job to Smith, who gladly agreed, since it was in his hometown. Smith still held this job with the Giants as of 2009.

In the 2006 World Baseball Classic, Smith served as the pitching coach of the South Africa national baseball team, which was eliminated in pool play, finishing with an 0–3 record. In 2007, Smith was a coach in the European Baseball Academy for Major League Baseball International in Tirrenia, Italy. For the 2009 World Baseball Classic, Smith returned as a coach for South Africa; the team was again eliminated during pool play, losing both of their games.

Smith has three children from a previous marriage, Nikita, Lee Jr. and Dimitri. From his current marriage, he has additional twins, Alana and Nicholas.

== National Baseball Hall of Fame candidacy ==
=== Background ===
In 1995, sportswriter Jim Murray selected Lee Smith as the active player most likely to be elected to the National Baseball Hall of Fame, describing him as "the best one-inning pitcher the game ever saw", and "the best at smuggling a game into the clubhouse in history."

Following Smith's retirement, there was speculation on his chances of becoming a member of the Hall of Fame, while more generally "debate continues to rage over how to properly value reliever contributions." At the time that Smith retired, only Hoyt Wilhelm and Rollie Fingers had been inducted to the Hall of Fame primarily for their relief pitching, in 1985 and 1992, respectively. During the time Smith appeared on Hall of Fame balloting (2003–2017), the Hall added relievers Dennis Eckersley (2004), Bruce Sutter (2006), and Goose Gossage (2008). Eckersley, Fingers, and Sutter each captured a Cy Young Award, with Eckersley and Fingers also winning MVP awards, while Smith fared no better than second in Cy Young Award voting and eighth in MVP voting (both coming in 1991). Smith pitched in a transitional era, when closers began to be expected to pitch only a single inning. Although Smith and Gossage each pitched in slightly over 1,000 games, Gossage ended his career with over 500 more innings pitched (1809 1/3 to 1289 1/3). Sutter was the first MLB pitcher elected to the Hall with fewer than 1,700 innings pitched; (Note: Several Hall of Fame pitchers who also or primarily played in the Negro leagues—for which data is incomplete—have innings pitched totals below 1,700, such as Satchel Paige and Leon Day.) Smith, who pitched less than 100 innings each season after 1984 and did not exceed 75 innings in any season after 1990, ended his career with fewer than 1,300.

In 2005, statistician Alan Schwarz described Smith as a long shot for election despite the career record, and used Retrosheet data to compare the saves of several top relievers including Smith, Eckersley, Fingers, Gossage and Sutter. While Smith's save percentage (82%), outs per save (3.72) and average of inherited runners per game (.50) compared well with Eckersley's marks (84%, 3.33, .49), his figures in the last two categories sharply trailed those of the others; Fingers, Gossage and Sutter all averaged between 4.72 and 4.82 outs per save, with Sutter inheriting .67 runners per game and the other two .86, suggesting their saves were harder to achieve. Smith started his career earning multiple-inning saves, but the strategy in baseball for closers changed, and he was later used as a one-inning pitcher. He had a higher career save percentage than Fingers, Gossage and Sutter. Closers Trevor Hoffman and Mariano Rivera—elected to the Hall in 2018 and 2019, respectively—exceeded Smith's former record of 478 saves, and the two are now widely considered the best ever one-inning closers.

In July 2006, at Sutter's induction to the Hall, Smith talked with reporters about his chances for election, commenting that he was puzzled that he had not yet been selected: "This confuses the hell out of me. But I've always been baffled by it."

=== BBWAA balloting ===
In annual balloting for the Hall of Fame by the Baseball Writers' Association of America (BBWAA), Smith received a high of 50.6% of votes cast, with 75% being the minimum for induction to the Hall. He appeared on the ballot from 2003 through 2017, never falling below 29.9% of the vote, with 5% being the minimum required each year to continue to appear on the ballot. He was removed from the ballot only when he reached the maximum of 15 appearances—he was the last player to appear on 15 BBWAA ballots, having been grandfathered after a 2014 change limited players to 10 years on the ballot.

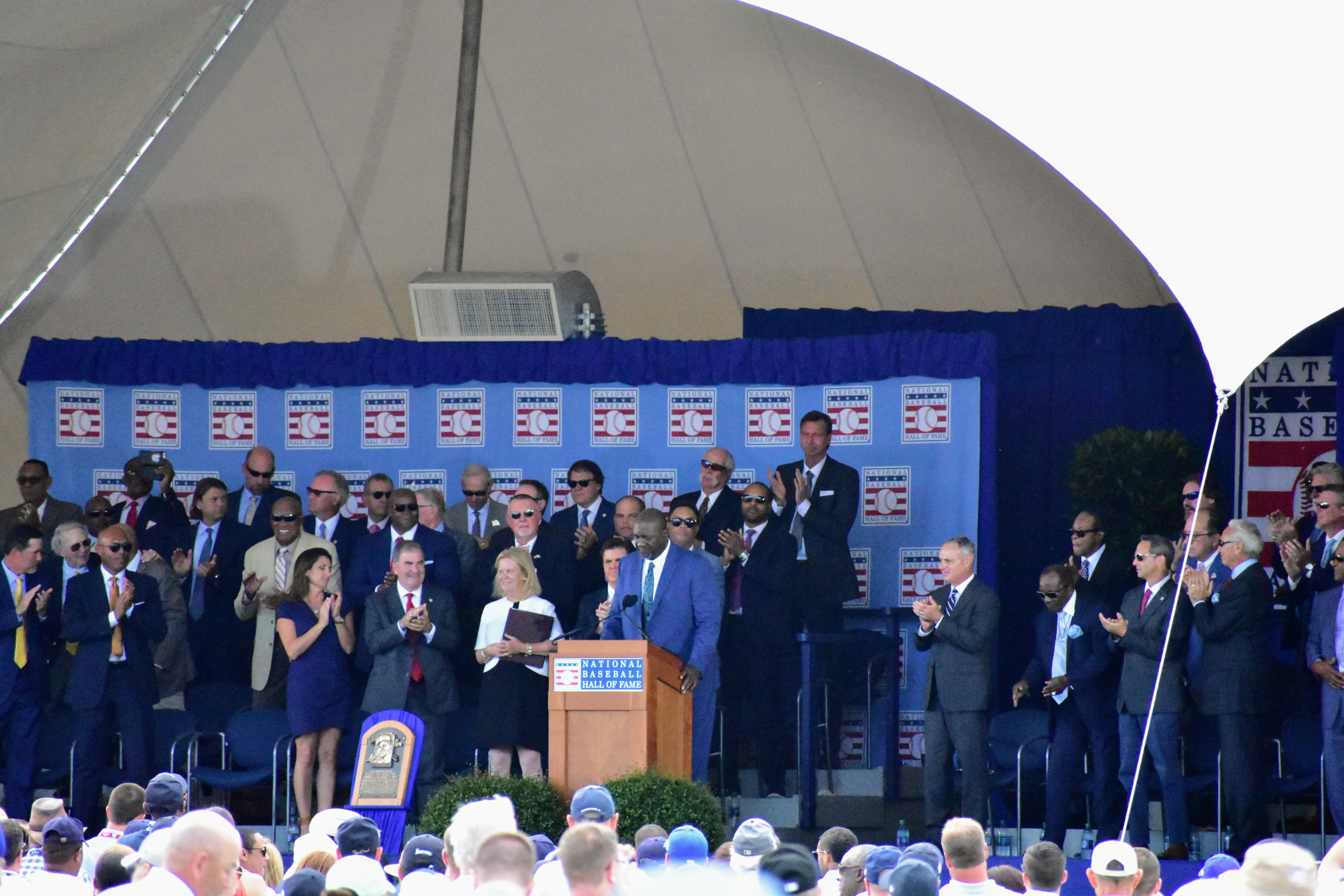
Smith (at podium) during his induction to the National Baseball Hall of Fame in 2019

National Baseball Hall of Fame balloting history for Lee Smith
| No. | Year | Votes | | | | Ref. | Notes |
| No. | Year | Received | Cast | Pct. | ± % | Ref. | Notes |
|---|---|---|---|---|---|---|---|
| 1 | 2003 | 210 | 496 | 42.3% | — | | First ballot appearance for Smith |
| 2 | 2004 | 185 | 506 | 36.6% | ▼5.7 | | Dennis Eckersley elected (1st year) |
| 3 | 2005 | 200 | 516 | 38.8% | ▲2.2 | | |
| 4 | 2006 | 234 | 520 | 45.0% | ▲6.2 | | Bruce Sutter elected (13th year) |
| 5 | 2007 | 217 | 545 | 39.8% | ▼5.2 | | |
| 6 | 2008 | 235 | 543 | 43.3% | ▲3.5 | | Goose Gossage elected (9th year) |
| 7 | 2009 | 240 | 539 | 44.5% | ▲1.2 | | |
| 8 | 2010 | 255 | 539 | 47.3% | ▲2.8 | | |
| 9 | 2011 | 263 | 581 | 45.3% | ▼2.0 | | |
| 10 | 2012 | 290 | 573 | 50.6% | ▲5.3 | | Highest percentage of votes for Smith |
| 11 | 2013 | 272 | 569 | 47.8% | ▼2.8 | | |
| 12 | 2014 | 171 | 571 | 29.9% | ▼17.9 | | Lowest percentage of votes for Smith |
| 13 | 2015 | 166 | 549 | 30.2% | ▲0.3 | | |
| 14 | 2016 | 150 | 440 | 34.1% | ▲3.9 | | |
| 15 | 2017 | 151 | 442 | 34.2% | ▲0.1 | | Final ballot appearance for Smith |

=== Election ===
After not being elected by the BBWAA, Smith was later selected for consideration by the 16-member Today's Game Committee as part of 2019 Baseball Hall of Fame balloting. On December 9, 2018, Smith and outfielder Harold Baines were elected, receiving 16 and 12 votes, respectively, to meet the 75% threshold for induction. A formal induction ceremony was held in Cooperstown, New York, on July 21, 2019. Along with Smith and Baines, the Hall inducted BBWAA-electees Roy Halladay, Edgar Martínez, Mike Mussina, and Mariano Rivera. Smith acknowledged his hometown during his speech, saying, "It wasn't just my arm that got me here. It's the whole community of Castor. I thank you."

== See also ==
- List of Major League Baseball annual saves leaders
- List of Major League Baseball career saves leaders
- List of Major League Baseball leaders in games finished
- Major League Baseball titles leaders
- List of St. Louis Cardinals team records

== Notes ==
Achievements
| Preceded by Jeff Reardon | All-Time Saves Leader; 1993–2005 | Succeeded by Trevor Hoffman |
