= List of Silver Slugger Award winners at designated hitter =

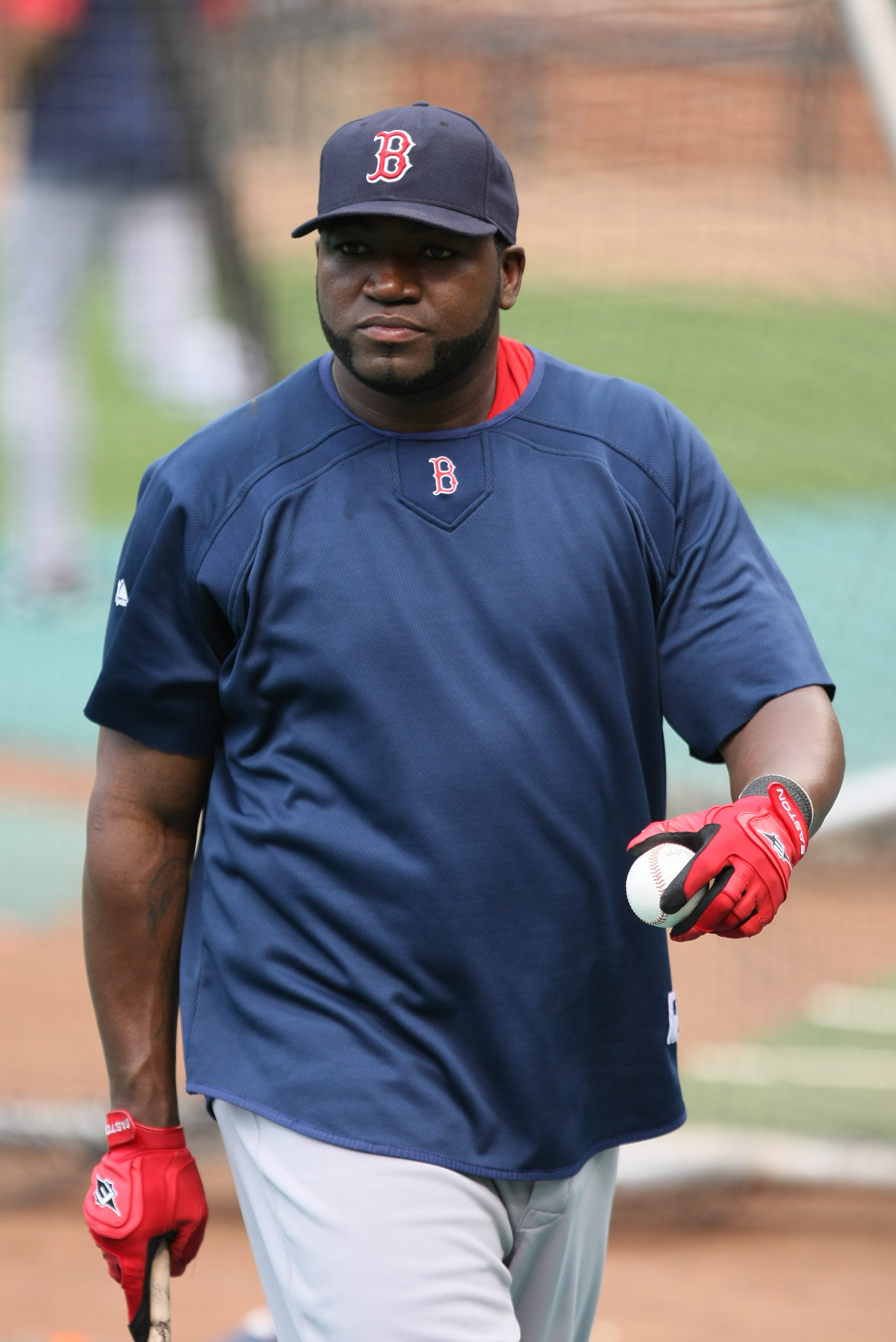
David Ortiz has won the most Silver Slugger Awards as a designated hitter, with seven.

The Silver Slugger Award is awarded annually to the best offensive player at each position in both the American League (AL) and the National League (NL), as determined by the coaches and managers of Major League Baseball (MLB). These voters consider several offensive categories in selecting the winners, including batting average, slugging percentage, and on-base percentage, in addition to "coaches' and managers' general impressions of a player's overall offensive value". Managers and coaches are not permitted to vote for players on their own team. The Silver Slugger was first awarded in 1980 and is given by Hillerich & Bradsby, the manufacturer of Louisville Slugger bats. The award is a bat-shaped trophy, 3 feet (91 cm) tall, engraved with the names of each of the winners from the league and plated with sterling silver.

From 1980 to 2019, and in 2021, a Silver Slugger Award for designated hitters (DH) was only given in the American League, because use of a DH in place of the pitcher in the batting order was prohibited in the National League; a Silver Slugger Award for pitchers was given for the National League instead. In the 2020 season, the National League temporarily allowed use of the designated hitter, and no pitcher was awarded the Silver Slugger Award. An award was given instead to the best designated hitter in the National League. The first NL Silver Slugger Award for designated hitter was given to Marcell Ozuna. Beginning in 2022, the pitcher Silver Slugger Award was retired after MLB announced the full-time implementation of the universal DH rule in both leagues. The Silver Slugger Award for DH is now awarded in both leagues.

David Ortiz has won the most Silver Sluggers as a designated hitter, capturing four consecutively from 2004 to 2007, and winning again in 2011, 2013, and 2016. Three players are tied with four wins. Paul Molitor won the award four times with three different teams: the Milwaukee Brewers in 1987 and 1988; the Toronto Blue Jays in 1993, when the team won the World Series; and the Minnesota Twins in 1996. Edgar Martínez won the award four times with the Seattle Mariners (1995, 1997, 2001, 2003). Shohei Ohtani won the award four times with two different teams: the Los Angeles Angels in 2021 and 2023 and the Los Angeles Dodgers in 2024 and 2025. Ohtani is also the only player to win the designated hitter Silver Slugger Award in both the American and National League, which he has achieved twice. Don Baylor won the Silver Slugger three times in four years (1983, 1985–1986) as a designated hitter with the New York Yankees and the Boston Red Sox, and Frank Thomas won it twice with the Chicago White Sox (1991, 2000). Harold Baines won the award while playing for two separate teams in the same season; he was traded by the White Sox to the Texas Rangers in the middle of the 1989 season. Yordan Alvarez and Kyle Schwarber are the most recent winners.

Martínez set the records for the highest batting average and on-base percentage in a designated hitter's winning season with his .356 and .479 marks, respectively, in 1995. Ohtani's slugging percentage of .654 in the 2023 season is the highest among all winners at the designated hitter position. Ohtani also holds the record for the most home runs hit in a Silver Slugger-winning season, with 55 set in 2025. Ortiz and Rafael Palmeiro hold the record for the most runs batted in in a Silver Slugger-winning season, with 148. Palmeiro set his record in 1999, and Ortiz tied it in 2005.

== Key ==
Year	Links to the corresponding Major League Baseball season
AVG	Batting average
OBP	On-base percentage
SLG	Slugging percentage
HR	Home runs
RBI	Runs batted in
Ref	References
* or **	Winner of the most Silver Sluggers in Major League Baseball as a designated hitter (** indicates tie)
†	Member of the National Baseball Hall of Fame and Museum

== American League winners ==
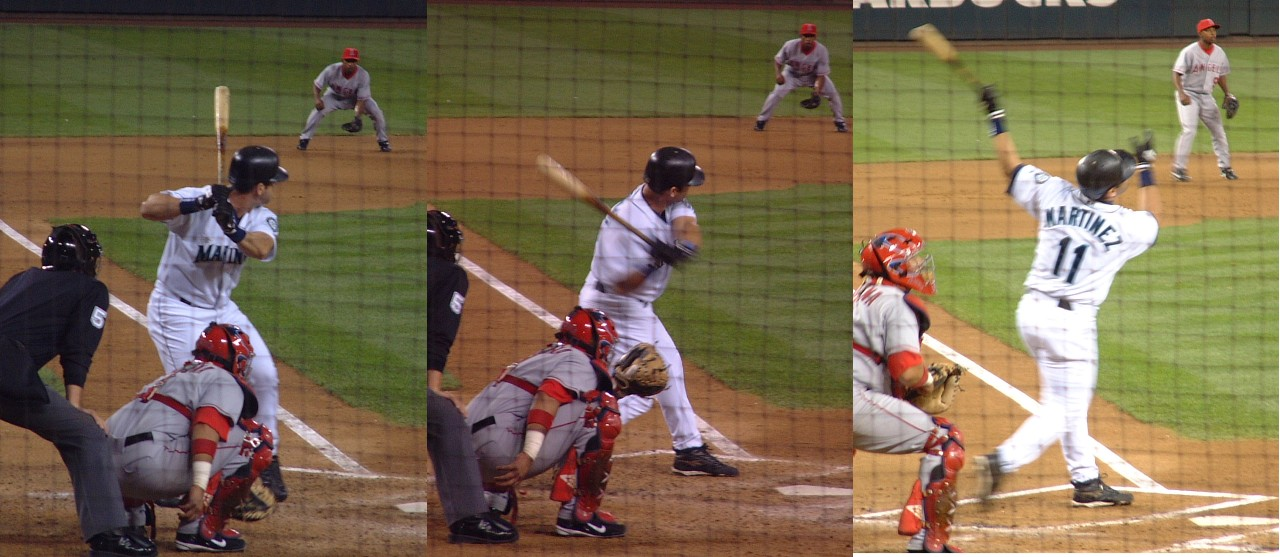
Edgar Martínez won four Silver Slugger Awards at DH, tied for second-most.

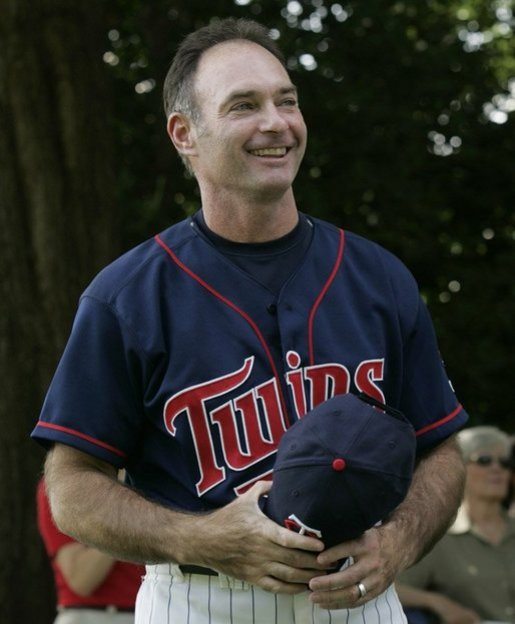
Paul Molitor won four Silver Slugger Awards at DH, tied for second-most.

Year	Player	Team	AVG	OBP	SLG	HR	RBI	Ref
1980	Reggie Jackson^{†}	New York Yankees	.300	.398	.597	41	111	
1981	Al Oliver	Texas Rangers	.309	.348	.411	4	55	
1982	Hal McRae	Kansas City Royals	.308	.369	.542	27	133	
1983	Don Baylor	New York Yankees	.303	.361	.494	21	85	
1984	Andre Thornton	Cleveland Indians	.271	.366	.484	33	99	
1985	Don Baylor (2)	New York Yankees	.231	.330	.430	23	91	
1986	Don Baylor (3)	Boston Red Sox	.238	.344	.439	31	94	
1987	Paul Molitor^{†}	Milwaukee Brewers	.353	.438	.566	16	75	
1988	Paul Molitor^{†} (2)	Milwaukee Brewers	.312	.384	.452	13	60	
1989	Harold Baines^{†}	Chicago White Sox; Texas Rangers	.309	.395	.465	16	72	
1990	Dave Parker^{†}	Milwaukee Brewers	.289	.330	.451	21	92	
1991	Frank Thomas^{†}	Chicago White Sox	.318	.453	.553	32	109	
1992	Dave Winfield^{†}	Toronto Blue Jays	.290	.377	.491	26	108	
1993	Paul Molitor^{†} (3)	Toronto Blue Jays	.332	.402	.509	22	111	
1994	Julio Franco	Chicago White Sox	.319	.406	.510	20	98	
1995	Edgar Martínez^{†}	Seattle Mariners	.356	.479	.628	29	113	
1996	Paul Molitor^{†} (4)	Minnesota Twins	.341	.390	.468	9	113	
1997	Edgar Martínez^{†} (2)	Seattle Mariners	.330	.456	.554	28	108	
1998	Jose Canseco	Toronto Blue Jays	.237	.318	.518	46	107	
1999	Rafael Palmeiro	Texas Rangers	.324	.420	.630	47	148	
2000	Frank Thomas^{†}	Chicago White Sox	.328	.436	.625	43	143	
2001	Edgar Martínez^{†} (3)	Seattle Mariners	.306	.423	.543	23	116	
2002	Manny Ramirez	Boston Red Sox	.349	.450	.647	33	107	
2003	Edgar Martínez^{†} (4)	Seattle Mariners	.294	.406	.489	24	98	
2004	David Ortiz*^{†}	Boston Red Sox	.301	.380	.603	41	139	
2005	David Ortiz*^{†} (2)	Boston Red Sox	.300	.397	.604	47	148	
2006	David Ortiz*^{†} (3)	Boston Red Sox	.287	.413	.636	54	137	
2007	David Ortiz*^{†} (4)	Boston Red Sox	.332	.445	.621	35	117	
2008	Aubrey Huff	Baltimore Orioles	.304	.360	.552	32	108	
2009	Adam Lind	Toronto Blue Jays	.305	.370	.562	35	114	
2010	Vladimir Guerrero^{†}	Texas Rangers	.300	.345	.496	29	115	
2011	David Ortiz*^{†} (5)	Boston Red Sox	.309	.398	.554	29	96	
2012	Billy Butler	Kansas City Royals	.313	.373	.510	29	107	
2013	David Ortiz*^{†} (6)	Boston Red Sox	.309	.395	.564	30	103	
2014	Víctor Martínez	Detroit Tigers	.335	.409	.565	32	103	
2015	Kendrys Morales	Kansas City Royals	.290	.362	.485	22	106	
2016	David Ortiz*^{†} (7)	Boston Red Sox	.315	.401	.620	38	127	
2017	Nelson Cruz	Seattle Mariners	.288	.375	.549	39	119	
2018	J. D. Martinez	Boston Red Sox	.330	.402	.629	43	130	
2019	Nelson Cruz (2)	Minnesota Twins	.311	.392	.639	41	108	
2020	Nelson Cruz (3)	Minnesota Twins	.303	.397	.595	16	33	
2021	Shohei Ohtani	Los Angeles Angels	.257	.372	.592	46	100	
2022	Yordan Alvarez	Houston Astros	.306	.406	.613	37	97	
2023	Shohei Ohtani (2)	Los Angeles Angels	.304	.412	.654	44	95	
2024	Brent Rooker	Oakland Athletics	.293	.365	.562	39	112	
2025	George Springer	Toronto Blue Jays	.309	.399	.560	32	84	
2026	Yordan Alvarez (2)	Houston Astros	.316	.432	.601	42	106	

== National League winners ==
In 2020, the COVID-19 pandemic resulted in the temporary implementation of a universal DH during the shortened season. A Silver Slugger Award for designated hitter in the National League was given for the first time. Starting in 2022, the National League adopted the designated hitter permanently, and the pitcher Silver Slugger Award was retired in favor of a similar honor for NL designated hitters.

Year	Player	Team	AVG	OBP	SLG	HR	RBI	Ref
2020	Marcell Ozuna	Atlanta Braves	.338	.431	.636	18	56	
2021	National League designated hitters' Silver Slugger Award not given							
2022	Josh Bell	Washington Nationals; San Diego Padres	.266	.362	.422	17	71	
2023	Bryce Harper	Philadelphia Phillies	.293	.401	.499	21	72	
2024	Shohei Ohtani (3)	Los Angeles Dodgers	.310	.390	.646	54	130	
2025	Shohei Ohtani (4)	Los Angeles Dodgers	.282	.392	.622	55	102	
2026	Kyle Schwarber	Philadelphia Phillies	.232	.354	.503	45	97	

== See also ==
- Edgar Martínez Award
