= Edgar Martínez Award =

Baseball award

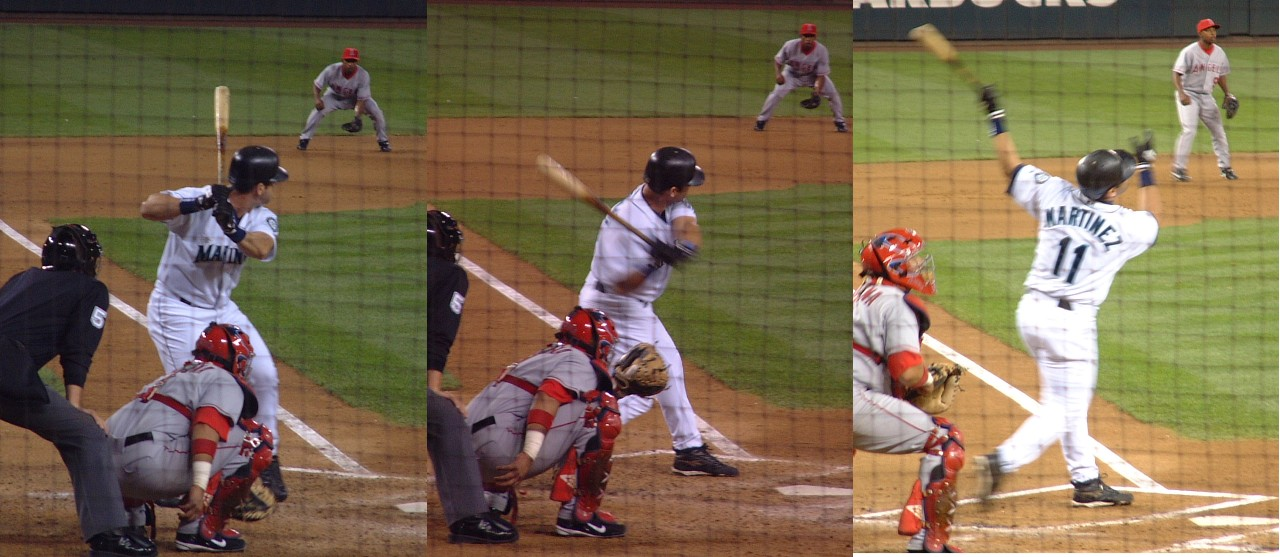
- The award was renamed in honor of Edgar Martínez, a five-time winner, upon his retirement.
- Awarded for: Most outstanding designated hitter in Major League Baseball (Exclusively American League for 1973–2019, 2021)
- Country: United States
- Presented by: Baseball Writers' Association of America

History
- First award: 1973
- Most wins: David Ortiz (8)
- Most recent: Yordan Alvarez (HOU)

The Edgar Martínez Outstanding Designated Hitter Award, commonly referred to as the Edgar Martínez Award and originally known as the Outstanding Designated Hitter Award, has been presented annually to the most outstanding designated hitter (DH) in Major League Baseball (MLB) since 1973. The award is voted on by club beat reporters, broadcasters, and public relations departments. The Associated Press discontinued the award in 2000, but it was picked up by the Baseball Writers' Association of America, which has administered it since. All players with a minimum of 100 at bats at DH are eligible. From the award's inception in 1973 until 2019, and in 2021, use of the designated hitter was allowed only in the American League (AL).

In September 2004, at Safeco Field (now T-Mobile Park) ceremonies in honor of Edgar Martínez, Commissioner Bud Selig announced that the award would be renamed for the five-time recipient (1995, 1997–98, 2000–01). In an 18-year career with the Seattle Mariners, primarily as a designated hitter, Martínez batted .312, with 309 career home runs and 1,261 runs batted in.

In 2020, MLB allowed the use of the designated hitter for the National League (NL) in addition to the AL, expanding eligibility for the award to designated hitters in either league. The 2020 winner was Marcell Ozuna of the Atlanta Braves, who became the first-ever winner of the award from the NL. In 2021, MLB returned to only using the designated hitter for the AL, before a new collective bargaining agreement between MLB and the players' union allowed the use of the designated hitter in the NL beginning in the 2022 season.

In 2021, Shohei Ohtani became the first player to win both the Edgar Martínez Award and the AL MVP award in the same season. He accomplished this feat again after the 2023 season. In 2024, Ohtani became the second player to win the award from the NL and the only player to win the award in both leagues.

== Key ==
Year	The MLB season the award was given
Player (X)	Denotes winning player and number of times they had won the award at that point (if more than one)
Team	The designated hitter's team
†	Elected to the Baseball Hall of Fame
*	Denotes player who is still active
BA	batting average
HR	Home runs
RBI	Runs batted in
Italics	Indicates player led the AL in that category
Italics	Indicates player led the NL in that category

== List of winners ==
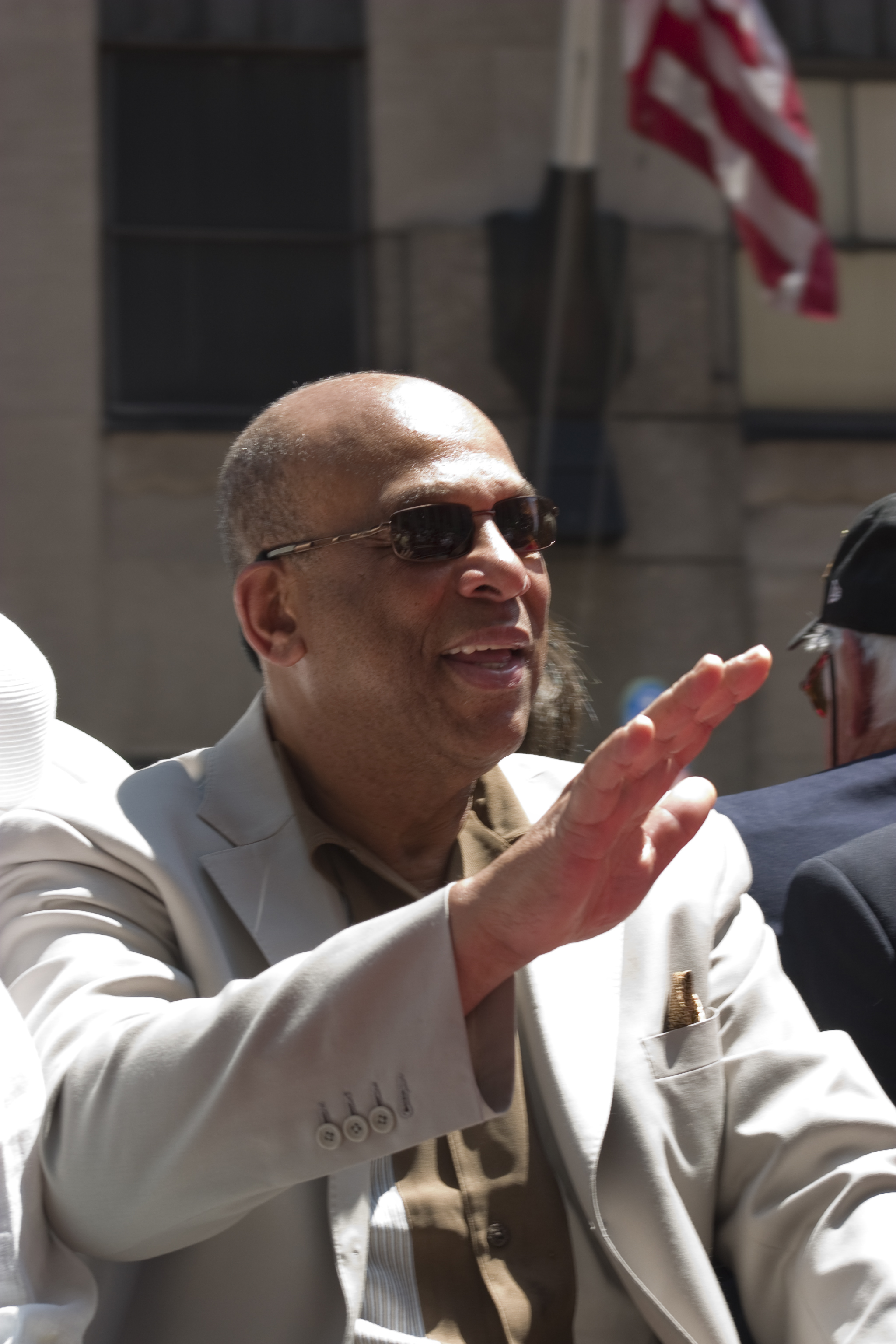
Hall of Famer Orlando Cepeda was the first winner of the award.

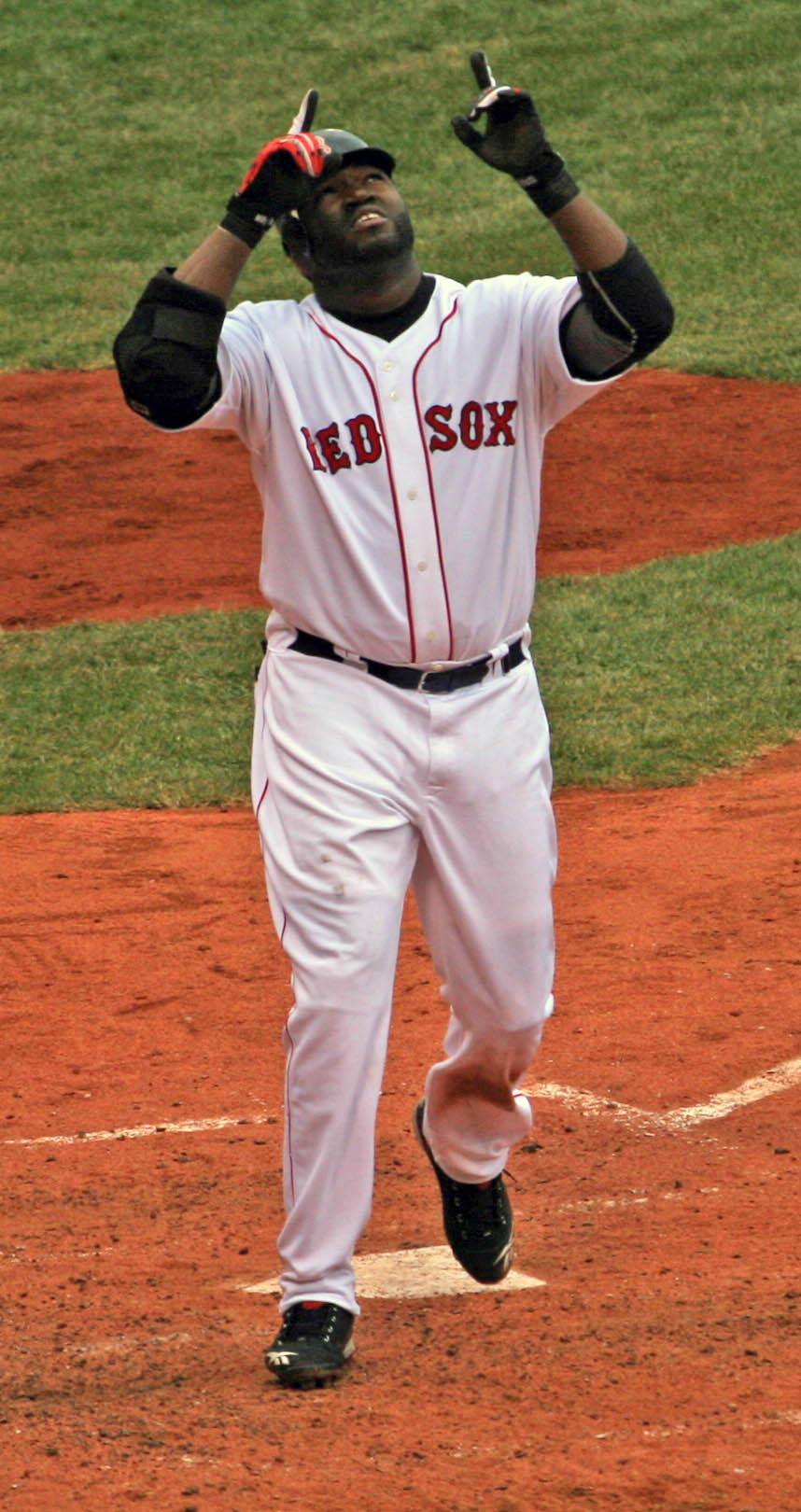
David Ortiz won the award eight times.

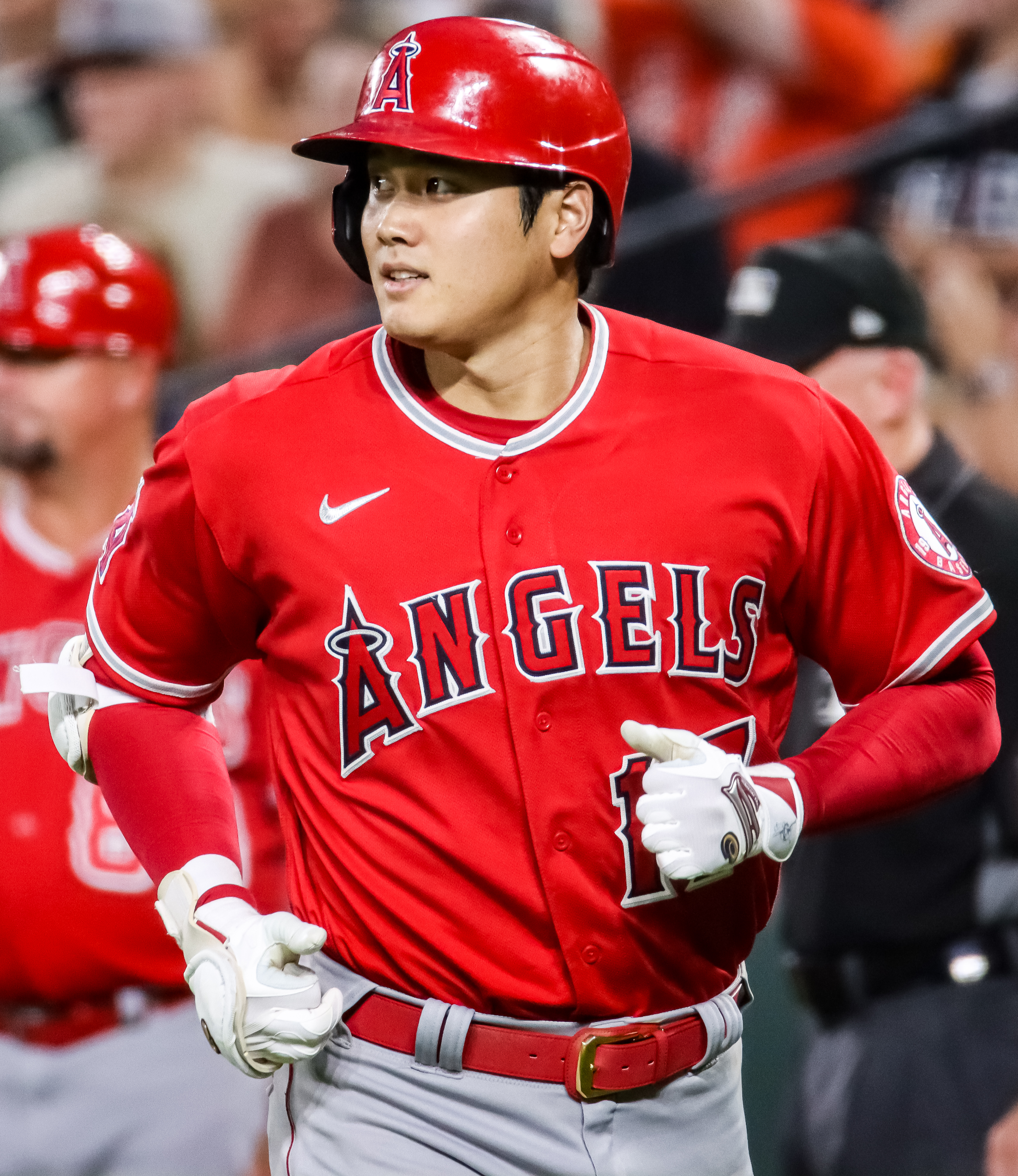
Shohei Ohtani won five consecutive awards from 2021 to 2025

Year	Player	Team	BA	HR	RBI	Ref
1973	Orlando Cepeda^{†}	Boston Red Sox	.289	20	86	
1974	Tommy Davis	Baltimore Orioles	.289	11	84	
1975	Willie Horton	Detroit Tigers	.275	25	92	
1976	Hal McRae	Kansas City Royals	.332	8	73	
1977	Jim Rice^{†}	Boston Red Sox	.320	39	114	
1978	Rusty Staub	Detroit Tigers	.273	24	121	
1979	Willie Horton (2)	Seattle Mariners	.279	29	106	
1980	Hal McRae (2)	Kansas City Royals	.297	14	83	
1981	Greg Luzinski	Chicago White Sox	.265	21	62	
1982	Hal McRae (3)	Kansas City Royals	.308	27	133	
1983	Greg Luzinski (2)	Chicago White Sox	.255	32	95	
1984	Dave Kingman	Oakland Athletics	.268	35	118	
1985	Don Baylor	New York Yankees	.231	23	91	
1986	Don Baylor (2)	Boston Red Sox	.238	31	94	
1987	Harold Baines^{†}	Chicago White Sox	.293	20	93	
1988	Harold Baines^{†} (2)	Chicago White Sox	.277	13	81	
1989	Dave Parker^{†}	Oakland Athletics	.264	22	97	
1990	Dave Parker^{†} (2)	Milwaukee Brewers	.289	21	92	
1991	Chili Davis	Minnesota Twins	.277	29	93	
1992	Dave Winfield^{†}	Toronto Blue Jays	.290	26	108	
1993	Paul Molitor^{†}	Toronto Blue Jays	.332	22	111	
1994	Not awarded due to the players' strike					
1995	Edgar Martínez^{†}	Seattle Mariners	.356	29	113	
1996	Paul Molitor^{†} (2)	Minnesota Twins	.341	9	113	
1997	Edgar Martínez^{†} (2)	Seattle Mariners	.330	28	108	
1998	Edgar Martínez^{†} (3)	Seattle Mariners	.322	29	102	
1999	Rafael Palmeiro	Texas Rangers	.324	47	148	
2000	Edgar Martínez^{†} (4)	Seattle Mariners	.324	37	145	
2001	Edgar Martínez^{†} (5)	Seattle Mariners	.306	23	116	
2002	Ellis Burks	Cleveland Indians	.301	32	91	
2003	David Ortiz^{†}	Boston Red Sox	.288	31	101	
2004	David Ortiz^{†} (2)	Boston Red Sox	.301	41	139	
2005	David Ortiz^{†} (3)	Boston Red Sox	.300	47	148	
2006	David Ortiz^{†} (4)	Boston Red Sox	.287	54	137	
2007	David Ortiz^{†} (5)	Boston Red Sox	.332	35	117	
2008	Aubrey Huff	Baltimore Orioles	.304	32	108	
2009	Adam Lind	Toronto Blue Jays	.305	35	114	
2010	Vladimir Guerrero^{†}	Texas Rangers	.300	29	115	
2011	David Ortiz^{†} (6)	Boston Red Sox	.309	29	96	
2012	Billy Butler	Kansas City Royals	.313	29	107	
2013	David Ortiz^{†} (7)	Boston Red Sox	.309	30	103	
2014	Víctor Martínez	Detroit Tigers	.335	32	103	
2015	Kendrys Morales	Kansas City Royals	.295	21	104	
2016	David Ortiz^{†} (8)	Boston Red Sox	.317	38	127	
2017	Nelson Cruz	Seattle Mariners	.288	39	119	
2018	Khris Davis	Oakland Athletics	.247	48	123	
2019	Nelson Cruz (2)	Minnesota Twins	.311	41	108	
2020	Marcell Ozuna*	Atlanta Braves	.338	18	56	
2021	Shohei Ohtani*	Los Angeles Angels	.257	46	100	
2022	Shohei Ohtani* (2)	Los Angeles Angels	.273	34	95	
2023	Shohei Ohtani* (3)	Los Angeles Angels	.304	44	95	
2024	Shohei Ohtani* (4)	Los Angeles Dodgers	.310	54	130	
2025	Shohei Ohtani* (5)	Los Angeles Dodgers	.282	55	102	
2026	Yordan Alvarez*	Houston Astros	.316	42	106	

== Multiple-time winners ==
Ten players have won the award multiple times. David Ortiz has won the award eight times (2003–2007, 2011, 2013, 2016), more than any other player. Other repeat winners of the award include Martinez himself (five times), five-time winner Shohei Ohtani (2021–2025), three-time winner Hal McRae (1976, 1980, and 1982), and two-time winners Willie Horton (1975 and 1979), Greg Luzinski (1981 and 1983), Don Baylor (1985 and 1986), Harold Baines (1987 and 1988), Dave Parker (1989 and 1990), Paul Molitor (1993 and 1996), and Nelson Cruz (2017 and 2019). Ohtani has the most wins of any active player. Boston Red Sox players have won the most Edgar Martínez Awards with 11.

Player	# of Awards	Years
David Ortiz^{†}	8	2003–2007, 2011, 2013, 2016
Edgar Martinez^{†}	5	1995, 1997, 1998, 2000, 2001
Shohei Ohtani*	5	2021–2025
Hal McRae	3	1976, 1980, 1982
Willie Horton	2	1975, 1979
Greg Luzinski	2	1981, 1983
Harold Baines^{†}	2	1978, 1988
Dave Parker^{†}	2	1989, 1990
Paul Molitor^{†}	2	1993, 1996
Nelson Cruz	2	2017, 2019

== See also ==
- List of Silver Slugger Award winners at designated hitter
- List of Major League Baseball awards
- Baseball awards § United States
