= 2019 Baseball Hall of Fame balloting =

Elections to the Baseball Hall of Fame

National Baseball

Hall of Fame and Museum
- New inductees: 6
- via BBWAA: 4
- via Today's Game Era Committee: 2
- Total inductees: 329
- Induction date: July 21, 2019

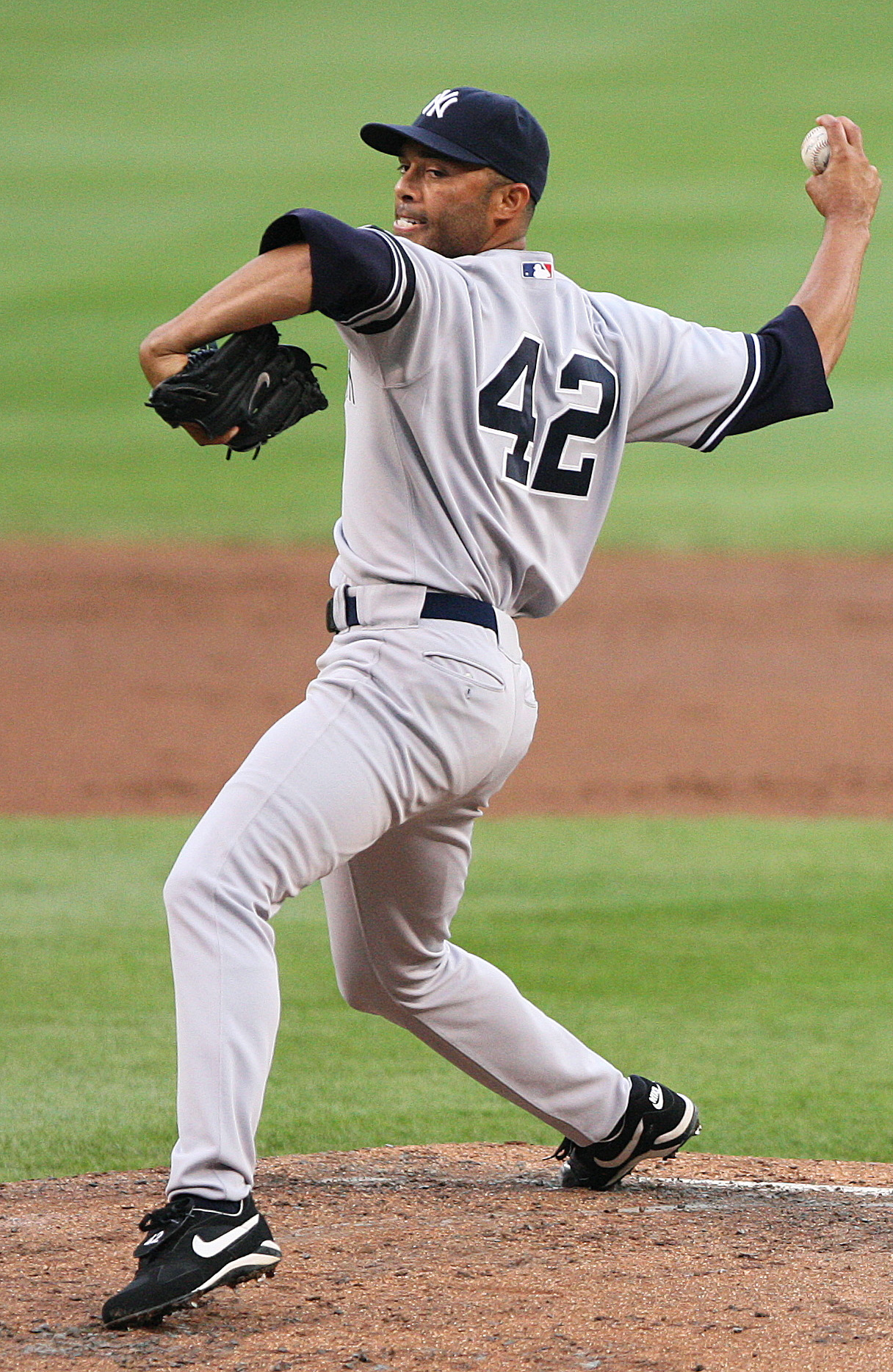
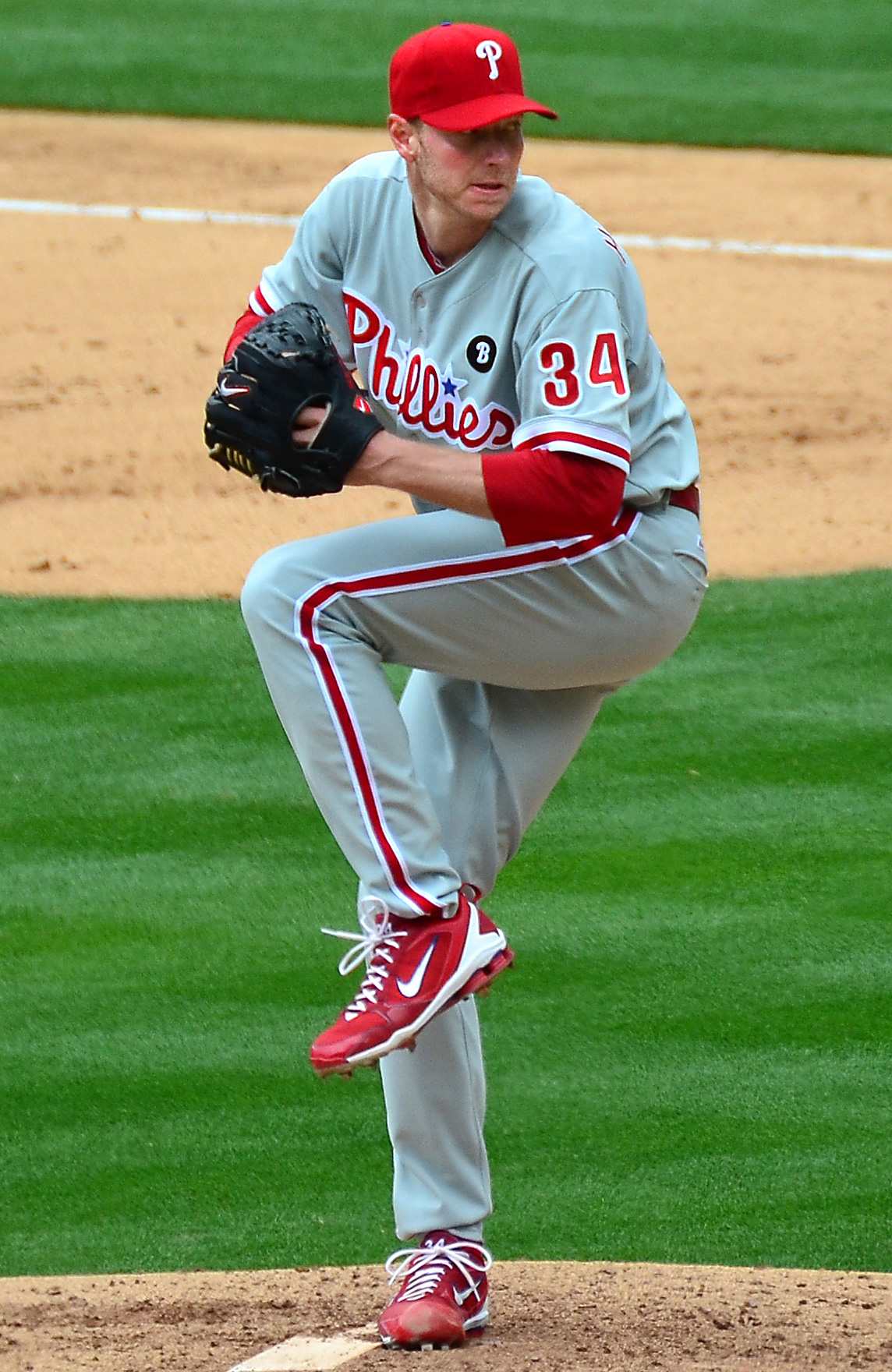
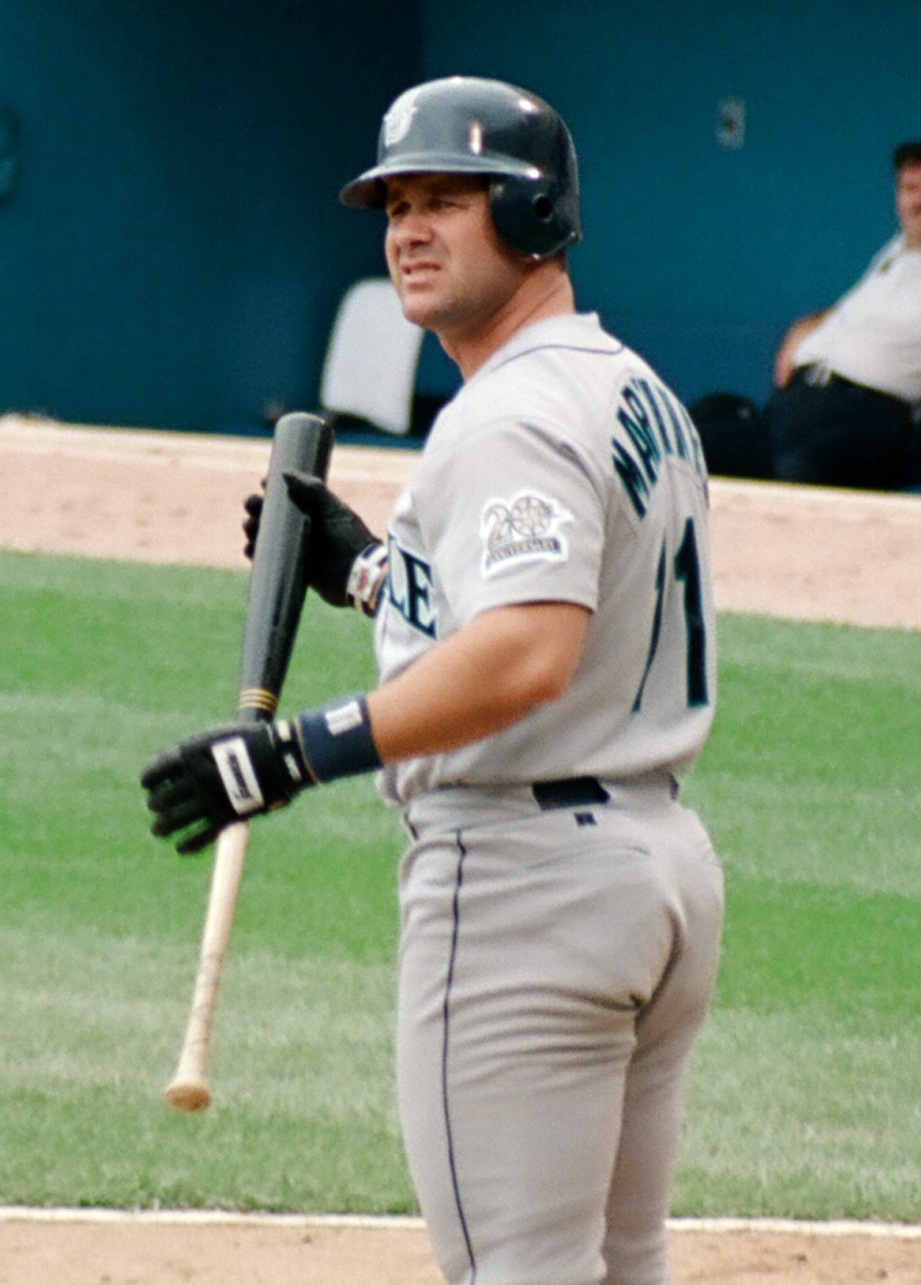
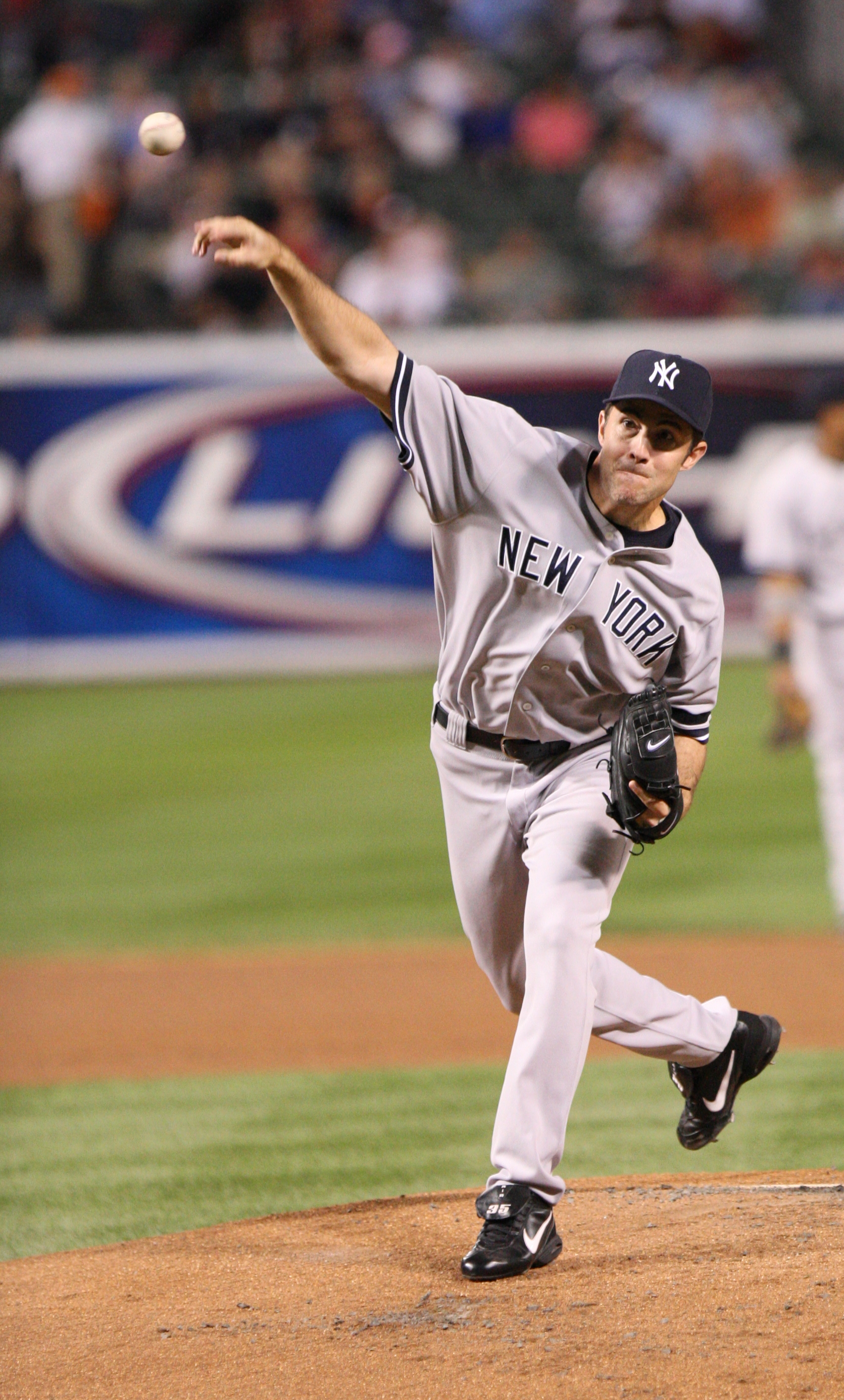
2019 BBWAA inductees (L-R): Mariano Rivera, Roy Halladay, Edgar Martínez, and Mike Mussina

Elections to the National Baseball Hall of Fame for 2019 proceeded according to rules most recently amended in 2016. As in the past, the Baseball Writers' Association of America (BBWAA) voted by mail to select from a ballot of recently retired players. The results were announced on January 22, 2019, with the BBWAA electing Mariano Rivera, Roy Halladay, Edgar Martínez, and Mike Mussina to the Hall of Fame. Rivera and Halladay were elected in their first year of eligibility, while Martínez was elected in his last year of eligibility. Rivera became the first player to be unanimously elected, appearing on all 425 ballots; he broke Ken Griffey Jr.'s record of 99.32 percent (437 out of 440), set in 2016.

The Today's Game Era Committee, one of four voting panels that since 2016 had taken over the role of the more broadly defined Veterans Committee, convened on December 9, 2018, to select from a ballot of retired players and non-playing personnel who made their greatest contributions to the sport after 1987, with Lee Smith and Harold Baines elected by this body. The formal induction ceremony was held at the Hall's facilities in Cooperstown, New York, on July 21, 2019.

== BBWAA election ==
Key
	Elected to the Hall of Fame on this ballot (named in **bold italics**).
	Elected subsequently, as of 2026 (named in plain italics).
	Renominated for the 2020 BBWAA election by adequate performance on this ballot and has not subsequently been eliminated.
	Eliminated from annual BBWAA consideration by poor performance or expiration on subsequent ballots.
	Eliminated from annual BBWAA consideration by poor performance or expiration on this ballot.
†	First time on the BBWAA ballot.
*	Eliminated from annual BBWAA consideration by poor performance on this ballot (not expiration).

The BBWAA election rules remained identical to those that were in effect for the most recent elections. The most recent rules change, announced in 2015, tightened the qualifications for the BBWAA electorate. Beginning with the 2016 election, eligible voters must not only have 10 years of continuous BBWAA membership, but also be currently active members, or have held active status within the 10 years prior to the election. A BBWAA member who has not been active for more than 10 years can regain voting status by covering MLB in the year preceding the election.

Edgar Martínez and Fred McGriff were on the ballot for their final time. McGriff dropped off the ballot, while Martínez was the sixth player to be elected in his final ballot, after Red Ruffing, Joe Medwick, Ralph Kiner, Jim Rice, and Tim Raines.

The ballot included two categories of players:

- Candidates from the 2018 ballot who received at least 5% of the vote but were not elected, as long as they first appeared on the BBWAA ballot no earlier than 2009.
- Selected individuals, chosen by a screening committee, whose last MLB appearance was in 2013.

319 votes were needed for election. A total of 425 ballots were cast, with 3,404 votes for individual players, an average of 8.01 names per ballot.

Voting results from 2019
Player	Votes	Percent	Change	Year
**Mariano Rivera**†	425	100%	–	1st
**Roy Halladay**†	363	85.4%	–	1st
**Edgar Martínez**	363	85.4%	▲15.0%	10th
**Mike Mussina**	326	76.7%	▲13.2%	6th
Curt Schilling	259	60.9%	▲9.7%	7th
Roger Clemens	253	59.5%	▲2.2%	7th
Barry Bonds	251	59.1%	▲2.7%	7th
Larry Walker	232	54.6%	▲20.5%	9th
Omar Vizquel	182	42.8%	▲5.8%	2nd
Fred McGriff	169	39.8%	▲16.6%	10th
Manny Ramirez	97	22.8%	▲0.8%	3rd
Jeff Kent	77	18.1%	▲3.6%	6th
Scott Rolen	73	17.2%	▲7.0%	2nd
Billy Wagner	71	16.7%	▲5.6%	4th
Todd Helton†	70	16.5%	–	1st
Gary Sheffield	58	13.6%	▲2.5%	5th
Andy Pettitte†	42	9.9%	–	1st
Sammy Sosa	36	8.5%	▲0.7%	7th
Andruw Jones	32	7.5%	▲0.2%	2nd
Michael Young†*	9	2.1%	–	1st
Lance Berkman†*	5	1.2%	–	1st
Miguel Tejada†*	5	1.2%	–	1st
Roy Oswalt†*	4	0.9%	–	1st
Plácido Polanco†*	2	0.5%	–	1st
Rick Ankiel†*	0	0%	–	1st
Jason Bay†*	0	0%	–	1st
Freddy García†*	0	0%	–	1st
Jon Garland†*	0	0%	–	1st
Travis Hafner†*	0	0%	–	1st
Ted Lilly†*	0	0%	–	1st
Derek Lowe†*	0	0%	–	1st
Darren Oliver†*	0	0%	–	1st
Juan Pierre†*	0	0%	–	1st
Vernon Wells†*	0	0%	–	1st
Kevin Youkilis†*	0	0%	–	1st

Players who were eligible for the first time in 2019 but were not on the ballot included Wilson Betemit, Henry Blanco, Tim Byrdak, Jamey Carroll, José Contreras, Jesse Crain, Ryan Dempster, Mark DeRosa, Matt Diaz, Octavio Dotel, Chad Durbin, Chad Gaudin, Édgar González, Mike Gonzalez, Jerry Hairston Jr., Ramón Hernández, Eric Hinske, Brandon Inge, César Izturis, Austin Kearns, Casey Kotchman, Mark Kotsay, Ryan Langerhans, Brandon Lyon, Corky Miller, Brett Myers, Laynce Nix, Ramón Ortiz, Cody Ransom, Jon Rauch, Chris Snyder, Yorvit Torrealba, Jake Westbrook, Ty Wigginton, and DeWayne Wise.

Rivera's unanimous election was not the only significant historic milestone from the 2019 BBWAA voting results. Halladay, who died in a plane crash in November 2017, became the first player to have been elected posthumously on the first ballot in a regular BBWAA election since Christy Mathewson in the first BBWAA election of 1936. Roberto Clemente was voted in via a special BBWAA election in 1973, shortly after his death in a plane crash and before he would have been eligible.

== Today's Game Era Committee ==
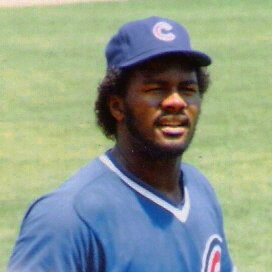
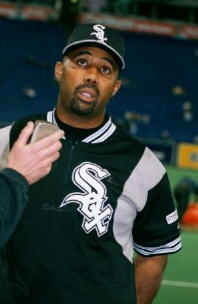
2019 Era Committee inductees Lee Smith (left) and Harold Baines

In 2016, the Hall of Fame announced changes to the Era Committee system. The system's timeframes were restructured to place a greater emphasis on the modern game, and to reduce the frequency at which individuals from the pre-1970 game (including Negro league baseball figures) would have their careers reviewed. Considering candidates whose greatest contributions occurred in 1988 and later, the Today's Game Era Committee met in 2018 as part of the elections for the next calendar year.

The Hall announced the 10 candidates for the Today's Game Era Committee ballot on November 5, 2018, with the committee scheduled to meet and vote at the 2018 winter meetings. Voting results were announced immediately after the committee meeting adjourned on December 9. The cutoff for election and induction remained the standard 75%, or 12 of 16 votes.

All of the candidates except George Steinbrenner were living when the ballot and results were announced. Harold Baines, being considered by the committee for the second time, received the necessary votes for election to the Hall of Fame in this balloting. Lee Smith, being considered by the committee for the first time, was also elected, unanimously. Lou Pinella missed election by a single vote.

Candidate	Category	Votes	Percent	Ref
Lee Smith	Player	16	100%	
Harold Baines	Player	12	75%	
Lou Piniella	Manager	11	68.75%	
Albert Belle	Player	<5		
Joe Carter	Player	<5		
Will Clark	Player	<5		
Orel Hershiser	Player	<5		
Davey Johnson	Manager	<5		
Charlie Manuel	Manager	<5		
George Steinbrenner	Executive	<5		

Note: Baines, Belle, Clark, Hershiser, Johnson, Piniella, and Steinbrenner were on the previous Today's Game Era Committee ballot in 2017.

The committee consisted of the following individuals:

- Hall of Famers: Roberto Alomar, Bert Blyleven, Pat Gillick, Tony La Russa, Greg Maddux, Joe Morgan, John Schuerholz, Ozzie Smith, Joe Torre
- Executives: Al Avila, Paul Beeston, Andy MacPhail, Jerry Reinsdorf
- Media and historians: Steve Hirdt, Tim Kurkjian, Claire Smith
- Non-voting committee chair: Jane Forbes Clark (Hall of Fame chairman)

Baines was elected by the committee despite never receiving more than 6.1% of the vote in any BBWAA election. His selection was heavily criticized by sportswriters due to his low wins above replacement numbers, poor performance in MVP voting, and lack of defensive playing time. John Tayler of Sports Illustrated called Baines "an indefensible and embarrassing choice" and wrote "there's no real argument for Baines as a Hall of Famer. If you can put one together, it's probably a bad one. You'd have an easier time making a case that he's one of the worst Hall of Famers ever." According to Yahoo Sports' Mike Oz, "There's no doubt that Baines getting into the Hall of Fame lowers the Cooperstown bar." Michael Rosenberg of Sports Illustrated said, "I feel a bit for Baines, who earned the ultimate compliment only to be told he didn't remotely deserve it. This is because he didn't remotely deserve it. Baines was a good player who does not belong in Hall of Fame conversations, let alone the Hall of Fame." Sports Illustrated's John Tayler and Tom Verducci noted that Baines' candidacy was helped by several committee members – Pat Gillick, Tony La Russa, and Jerry Reinsdorf – who were connected to his teams.

== J. G. Taylor Spink Award ==
The J. G. Taylor Spink Award has been presented by the BBWAA at the annual summer induction ceremonies since 1962. Through 2010, it was awarded during the main induction ceremony, but is now given the previous day at the Hall of Fame Awards Presentation. It recognizes a sportswriter "for meritorious contributions to baseball writing". The recipients are not members of the Hall of Fame but are featured in a permanent exhibit at the National Baseball Museum.

The three finalists for the 2019 award were announced on July 18, 2018 during the Major League Baseball All-Star break:

- Jayson Stark, The Athletic
- Jim Reeves, Fort Worth Star-Telegram
- Patrick Reusse, Star Tribune (Minneapolis)

Stark was announced as the recipient during the 2018 winter meetings on December 11. Stark received 270 of the 463 ballots cast (including 2 blank ballots) to Reeves' 111 and Reusse's 80.

== Ford C. Frick Award ==
Various changes in July 2016 were also made to the annual Ford C. Frick Award elections, presented annually to a preeminent baseball broadcaster since 1978. According to the Hall, the new criteria for selection are "Commitment to excellence, quality of broadcasting abilities, reverence within the game, popularity with fans, and recognition by peers."

Additionally, a ballot of eight candidates was set, down from 10 in years past. The three ballot slots previously determined by fan voting on Facebook were now filled by a committee of historians.

A new election cycle was established, rotating annually between "Current Major League Markets" (team-specific announcers) with the 2017 Frick Award; "National Voices" (broadcasters whose contributions were realized on a national level) with the 2018 Frick Award; and "Broadcasting Beginnings" (early team voices and pioneers of baseball broadcasting) with the 2019 Frick Award. This cycle repeated every three years.

The Hall announced the following finalists for the 2019 Ford C. Frick Award on October 22, 2018.

- Connie Desmond
- Pat Flanagan
- Jack Graney
- Harry Heilmann
- Al Helfer
- Waite Hoyt
- Rosey Rowswell
- Ty Tyson

All finalists had been deceased for at least 30 years when the ballot was announced, the most recently deceased being Hoyt in 1984. Two finalists, Heilmann and Hoyt, are members of the Hall of Fame as players.

The Hall announced Al Helfer as the recipient on December 12, 2018. Helfer (1911–1975) called games for eight MLB teams in a career that spanned more than 30 years. He was most notable as forming one of MLB's first play-by-play teams in the 1930s alongside fellow Frick Award recipient Red Barber, and also as the lead announcer for the Mutual Broadcasting System's Game of the Day in the 1950s.
