= ImageSource =

Information technology management company

ImageSource Inc.
- Industry: Enterprise Content Management, Document Imaging, Document Management, Content Management
- Founded: Olympia, Washington (1995)
- Headquarters: Olympia, Washington
- Number of locations: Irvine, California and Monument, Colorado
- Area served: Worldwide
- Key people: Terry Sutherland, President and CEO; Mike Hemphill, CFO & CLO; Ryan Keller, CSIO
- Products: ILINX Software; Document Management; Document Imaging; Records Management; Workflow; Conversion
- Website: www.imagesourceinc.com

ImageSource is a software and systems integration firm specializing in Enterprise Content Management. After years of providing integration services, ImageSource developed their own line of enterprise content management (ECM) tools based on principles of speed, ease of use, and flexibility. Their main areas of focus include data capture, workflow, content management, and eForms.

ImageSource launched its own ECM software suite ILINX® in 2010. ImageSource, Inc. is headquartered in Olympia, Washington, with an office in Irvine, California.

== History ==
- 1995: ImageSource is founded by Terry Sutherland and Victor Zvirzdys as a capture/scanner sales/computer services company.
- 1995: ImageSource becomes incorporated.
- 2007: ImageSource trademarks the Nexus brand.
- 2012: ImageSource develops and brands ECMECOSYSTEM, an in-depth consultation methodology.

== Technology partners ==
ImageSource has long-term technology partners with specialized software in capture, document imaging, workflow, web content management, records management, and other ECM functionality.

== Hardware Partners ==
- Kodak

== ILINX Products ==
ImageSource develops their own line of enterprise content management software applications called ILINX. Their clients range from city and state governments to Superior Courts, Universities, Financial Institutions, and Hospitals.

== Awards ==
- 2007 Inc. 5000 List Award
- 2009 Carl E Nelson Best Practices Award showcasing successful ECM implementations
- 2010 Puget Sound Business Journal Award for Washington Best Workplaces
- 2014 Puget Sound Business Journal Award for Washington Best Workplaces
