= Edgar Martínez =

Puerto Rican baseball player (born 1963)

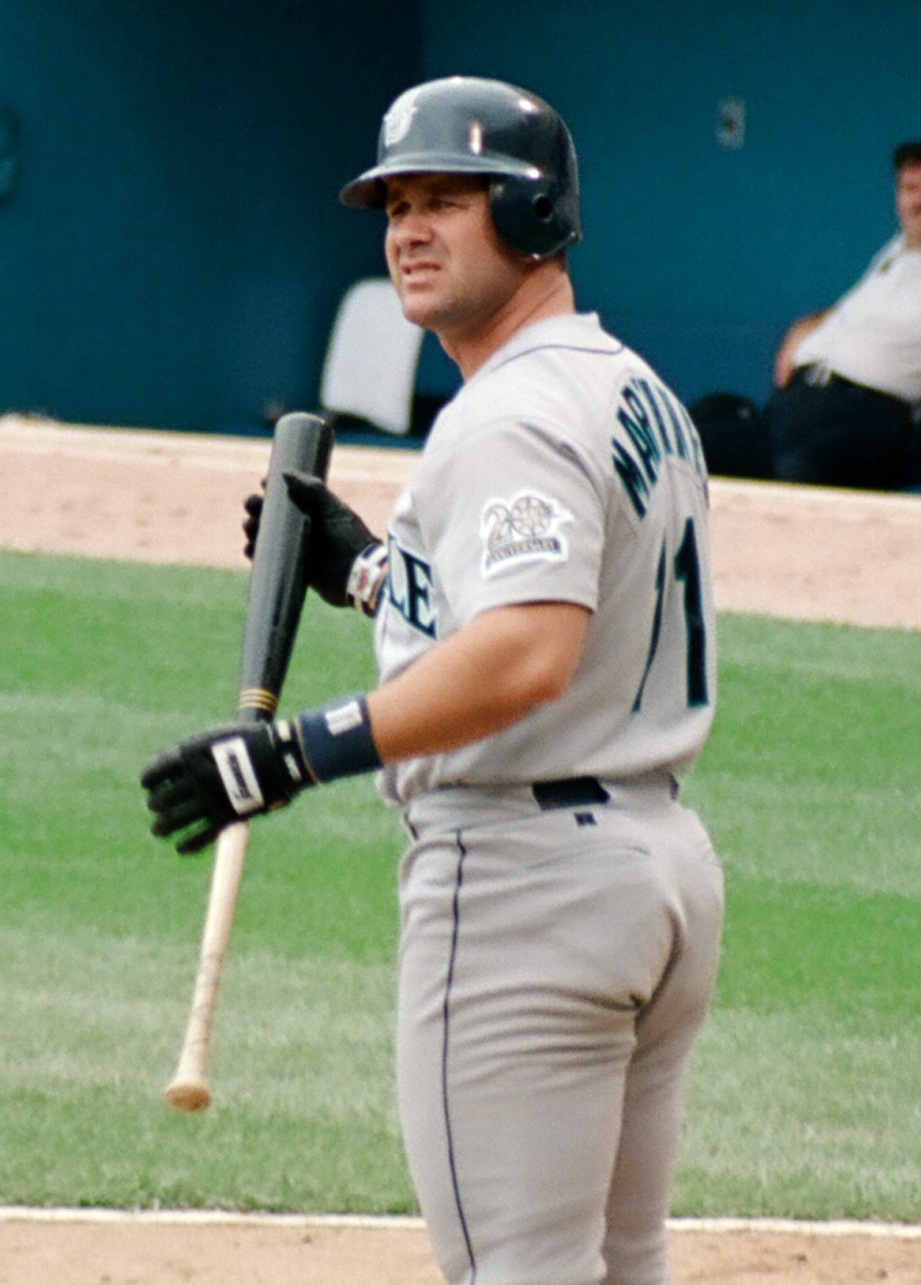
- Martínez with the Seattle Mariners in 1997

Seattle Mariners – No. 11
- Designated hitter / Third baseman / Coach
- Born: January 2, 1963 (age 63); New York City, New York, U.S.
- Batted: Right Threw: Right

MLB debut
- September 12, 1987, for the Seattle Mariners

Last MLB appearance
- October 3, 2004, for the Seattle Mariners

MLB statistics
- Batting average: .312
- Hits: 2,247
- Home runs: 309
- Runs batted in: 1,261
- Stats at Baseball Reference

Teams
- As player: Seattle Mariners (1987–2004); As coach: Seattle Mariners (2015–2018, 2024–present)

Career highlights and awards
- 7× All-Star (1992, 1995–1997, 2000, 2001, 2003); 5× Silver Slugger Award (1992, 1995, 1997, 2001, 2003); Roberto Clemente Award (2004); 2× AL batting champion (1992, 1995); AL RBI leader (2000); Seattle Mariners No. 11 retired; Seattle Mariners Hall of Fame

Member of the National

Baseball Hall of Fame
- Induction: 2019
- Vote: 85.4% (tenth ballot)

Edgar Martínez (born January 2, 1963), nicknamed "Gar" and "Papi", is a Puerto Rican former professional baseball player who is currently the senior director of hitting strategy coach for the Seattle Mariners of Major League Baseball (MLB). He played in MLB as a designated hitter and third baseman for Seattle from 1987 to 2004. He served as the Mariners' hitting coach from 2015 to 2018 and returned to the position in August 2024. He has also been a hitting advisor with the Mariners from 2019 through 2024.

Martínez grew up in Dorado, Puerto Rico. Not highly regarded as a prospect, he signed with the Mariners as a free agent in 1982, and was given a small signing bonus. He made his major league debut in 1987 but did not establish himself as a full-time player until 1990, at age 27. In the 1995 American League Division Series, he hit "The Double", which won the series and increased public support for Mariners baseball as they attempted to fund a new stadium. He continued to play until 2004, when injuries forced him to retire. MLB's award for the best designated hitter was renamed the Edgar Martínez Award in 2004 before his retirement.

Martínez was a seven-time MLB All-Star, five-time Silver Slugger, and two-time batting champion. He is one of 15 MLB players to record a batting average of .300, an on-base percentage of .400, and a slugging percentage of .500 in 8,500 or more plate appearances. The Mariners retired his uniform number 11 and inducted him into the Seattle Mariners Hall of Fame. In 2019, Martínez was elected into the National Baseball Hall of Fame.

== Early life ==
Martínez was born in New York City on January 2, 1963, to José and Christina Salgado Martínez, who were from Puerto Rico. His parents divorced when he was two years old, and he was raised by his grandparents, who lived in the barrio of Maguayo in Dorado, Puerto Rico. When he was 11 years old, his parents reconciled. His brother and sister returned to New York to live with their parents, but Edgar opted to remain in Dorado with his grandparents.

Martinez became inspired to play baseball after watching fellow Puerto Rican Roberto Clemente play in the 1971 World Series. He began playing in youth leagues when he was 11. He played with his older cousin Carmelo Martínez in the backyard of his home. Scouts watched Carmelo with interest, but Edgar did not draw their attention. He attended Interamerican University of Puerto Rico, studying business administration. He played semi-professional baseball and worked two jobs, as a supervisor in a furniture store by day and in a General Electric factory at night.

== Playing career ==
=== Prospect (1982–1987) ===
At the suggestion of the owner of his semi-professional team, Martínez attended a tryout held by the Seattle Mariners of Major League Baseball (MLB). Despite nearly missing the tryout after a long night working at the factory and being "so tired [he] couldn't swing the bat," the Mariners signed him to a contract with a $4,000 signing bonus (a small amount at the time) on December 12, 1982, shortly before his 20th birthday. He initially considered declining the offer, due to the money he was making in Puerto Rico, but Carmelo convinced him to sign.

Martínez made his professional debut in Minor League Baseball with the Bellingham Mariners of the Class A-Short Season Northwest League in 1983 as a third baseman. He had a .173 batting average, no home runs and only 18 hits in 32 games. He struggled with speaking English early in his career. The scout who signed Martínez convinced Mariners general manager Hal Keller to assign him to the Arizona Instructional League (AIL) after the season. Keller did not believe Martínez would be able to hit in the major leagues and initially did not want to assign him to the AIL, which is reserved for the best prospects. Keller included Martínez in the AIL that year, where he batted .340.

In 1984, Martínez batted .303 with 15 home runs and 84 walks for the Wausau Timbers of the Class A Midwest League. Martínez played for the Chattanooga Lookouts of the Double-A Southern League and Calgary Cannons of the Triple-A Pacific Coast League (PCL) in 1985, batting .258 in 111 games for Chattanooga and .353 in 20 games for Calgary. He returned to Chattanooga in 1986 and had a .960 fielding percentage, which led all third basemen. Playing for Calgary in 1987, Martínez had a .327 batting average, 10 home runs, and 31 doubles in 129 games. He led Calgary in batting average, hits, doubles, games played, and walks.

=== Early career (1987–1989) ===
Martínez made his major league debut on September 12, 1987 as a third baseman and proceeded to hit .372 in 13 games that season. However, the Mariners were committed to using Jim Presley as their third baseman. In 1988, Martínez began the season with Calgary but was called up to the major leagues in early May. He played in four games with the Mariners before returning to Calgary, where he hit .363, the best batting average in the PCL. In September, he was called up again, and over 10 games hit .389. In his second MLB season, he hit .281 with a .351 on-base percentage (OBP) and a .406 slugging percentage over 14 games.

The Mariners named Martínez their starting third baseman on their Opening Day roster in 1989. He struggled and was sent back down to Calgary in May. He hit .345 over 32 games for the Cannons and .240 in 65 games for the Mariners that season. After the regular season, Martínez played winter baseball in the Puerto Rican Baseball League. He batted .424 in 43 games, leading the league, and was named co-MVP with Carlos Baerga.

=== First full seasons and batting title (1990–1992) ===
In 1990, Martínez signed a one-year contract for $90,000. With Presley gone, Darnell Coles began the season as the Mariners' starting third baseman. Manager Jim Lefebvre told The Seattle Times during spring training: "I think Darnell Coles is going to surprise a lot of people. He knows there is no one in the wings, just Edgar Martinez to back him up." However, Coles committed five errors in Seattle's first six games. Lefebvre moved Coles to the outfield and began playing Martínez at third base. Over 144 games, Martínez hit .302, and had a .397 OBP, both of which led the team. He dealt with leg injuries during the season and had right knee surgery following the season.

Martínez signed a two-year, $850,000 contract before the 1991 season. That year, he won his first American League (AL) Player of the Week Award for the week ending July 14. He finished the season hitting .307/.405/.452, all career highs at the time. In 1992, Martínez was selected to his first All-Star Game and won his first two AL Player of the Month Awards for July and then August. In August, he signed a three-year, $10 million contract extension with Seattle, the largest contract given out by Seattle to that point. He missed the last 19 games of the season, undergoing surgery to remove bone spurs in his right shoulder in September. Martínez had a .343 batting average in 1992, which led the majors. It was the first batting title for Seattle and the franchise's highest single-season batting average (since surpassed by Ichiro Suzuki). Martínez also tied Frank Thomas for the most doubles in MLB and set a team record for most doubles in a season (since surpassed by Alex Rodriguez). After the season, Martínez was awarded his first AL Silver Slugger Award as a third baseman.

=== Injuries (1993–1994) ===
During an exhibition game at BC Place in Vancouver, British Columbia before the 1993 season, Martínez tore his hamstring on an unzipped seam in the turf between first and second base. He missed 42 games at the start of the season and was placed on the disabled list twice more during the season. In 1994, in his first plate appearance of the season, opposing pitcher Dennis Martínez hit him in the right wrist, and he returned to the disabled list. Between the injuries and the 1994–95 MLB strike, he played in 131 games during the 1993 and 1994 seasons. In 89 games in 1994, he played 65 games as a third baseman and 23 as a designated hitter, with one appearance as a pinch runner.

=== Career year (1995) ===
Martínez became a full-time designated hitter in 1995. He won the a Player of the Week Award and later Player of the Month Award for June, with a .402/.537/.761 slash line that month. He was then selected to the All-Star Game and set career highs in eleven offensive categories. At the end of the year, he won his second AL batting title with a team-record .356 and led the league in runs scored with 121, doubles with 52, OBP with .479 and on-base plus slugging (OPS) with 1.109 (all team records at that point). He also finished third in AL Most Valuable Player Award voting behind Mo Vaughn and Albert Belle. He won his second Silver Slugger Award and his first Outstanding Designated Hitter Award.

==== The Double ====
"1995 AL Division Series Winning Call"
The winning call of the 1995 American League Division Series, now named "The Double", as called by Dave Niehaus

In the 1995 American League Division Series (ALDS) against the New York Yankees, Martínez hit .571 and reached base 18 times in five games. In Game 4 of that series, he hit a three-run home run, then a grand slam home run that broke a 6–6 tie, en route to an 11–8 victory. His seven runs batted in (RBIs) in that game tied a single-game postseason record. The win knotted the best-of-five series at two games apiece and forced Game 5. Down 5–4 in the 11th inning of that decisive game, Martínez hit a two-run double off Jack McDowell, winning the game for the Mariners, 6–5, and series, 3–2. The win sent the Mariners to the American League Championship Series (ALCS) for the first time in franchise history, a series they would eventually lose to the Cleveland Indians in six games.

A lot of people remember that double when they talk about my career, I'd say, yeah, that would define my career.

— Edgar Martínez, ESPN: September 25, 2004.

The double entered baseball lore, referred to as "The Double", by Mariners fans. The Mariners' 1995 postseason run helped build the groundswell of public support that led the Washington State Legislature to pass legislation to fund a dedicated baseball stadium in Seattle to replace the Kingdome. Mariners' manager Lou Piniella referred to it as "the hit, the run, the game, the series and the season that saved baseball in Seattle." At a rally after the series, fans held up a banner calling Martínez "Señor October".

=== Continued success (1996–2001) ===
In 1996, Martínez batted .327 and was selected for the MLB All-Star Game. He played one game at third base during the season, during which he collided with John Marzano, breaking four ribs and missing 21 games. On August 21, 1996, Martínez recorded his 1,000th career MLB hit. Martínez was selected to the 1997 MLB All-Star Game and won the Silver Slugger Award at the end of the 1997 season. He finished second in the AL with a .330 average. The Mariners made the 1997 ALDS, but lost to the Baltimore Orioles in four games. Martínez batted .188 in the series. He won his second Outstanding Designated Hitter Award. In 1998, Martínez batted .320 with 29 home runs. He led the AL with a .429 OBP, and won his third Outstanding Designated Hitter Award.

In 1999, Martínez was diagnosed with strabismus, a condition which causes the eyes to not properly align. For Martínez, his right eye would intermittently drift and cause him to lose depth perception. For the 1999 season, he led the AL with a .447 OBP and batted .337. He recorded his 1,500th hit on August 14. In 2000, Martínez earned his fifth All-Star Game selection. He hit 37 home runs, his single-season best, and led the American League with 145 RBIs. The Mariners reached the postseason, and Martínez batted .364 in the ALDS, defeating the Chicago White Sox. The Mariners lost to the Yankees in the ALCS. Martínez finished sixth in AL MVP Award balloting and won the Outstanding Designated Hitter Award.

In 2001, Martínez was again elected to the All-Star Game, held in Seattle. He batted .306 with 116 RBIs, his tenth season with a .300 or better batting average (his seventh consecutive) and his sixth season with 100 RBIs. Seattle tied the major league record set by the 1906 Chicago Cubs with 116 wins on the season. Martínez hit .313 with two home runs in the ALDS as Seattle defeated Cleveland, but he batted .150 in the ALCS as they lost to the Yankees. He won the Silver Slugger Award and the Outstanding Designated Hitter Award in 2001.

=== Later career (2002–2004) ===
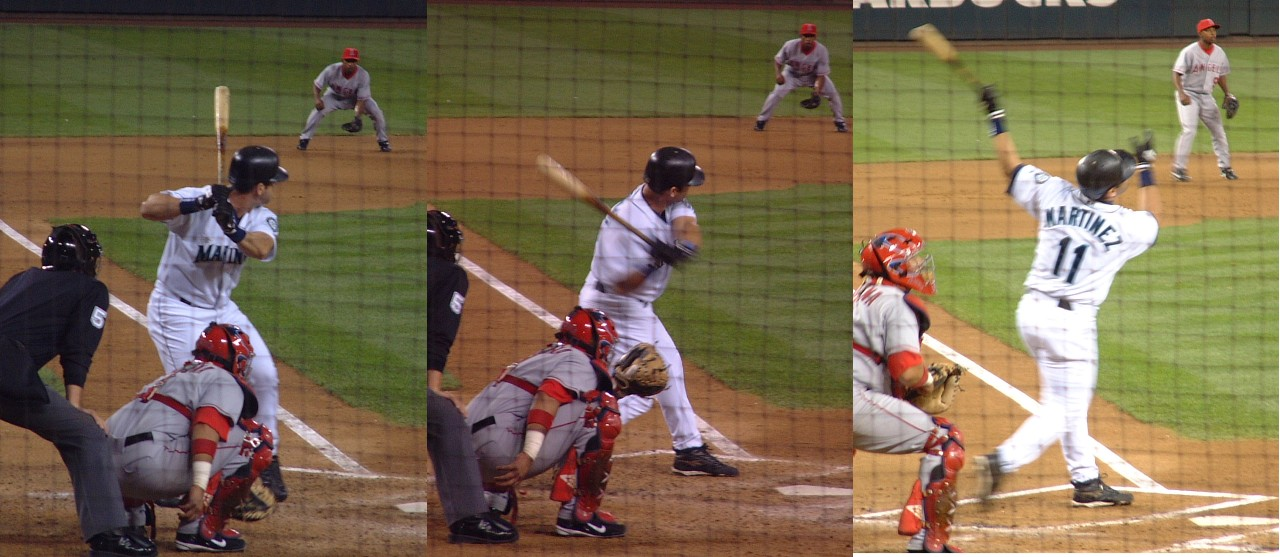
Martínez at bat in 2004

Martínez dealt with leg injuries in 2002, playing in 97 games. He left a game after pulling his hamstring and had surgery to repair a ruptured tendon in his left knee. Though he was batting .301 on September 8, he entered a slump late in the season and ended the year with a .277 batting average. In 2003, Martínez again dealt with hamstring injuries. He batted .304 in the first half of the season and was named to the All-Star Game. On May 2, Martínez had his 2,000th career hit. He broke a toe when it was hit by a foul ball in September, which limited him for the rest of the season. He ended the season with a .294 batting average, 24 home runs, and a .403 OBP. He won his fifth Silver Slugger Award in 2003.

In 2004, Martínez struggled with a sore back, leg injuries, and difficulties with his eyesight. The Mariners struggled, falling out of the postseason chase, and the team began to give playing time at designated hitter to Bucky Jacobsen. On August 9, Martínez announced his retirement, effective at the end of the season. Martínez said this about his choice of retiring and career in Seattle:

It is hard, very hard, I feel in my mind and my heart I want to keep playing. But my body is saying something differently, so I feel this is a good decision.

— Edgar Martínez, August 10, 2004, The Seattle Times

On October 2, the Mariners held "Edgar Martínez Day." Baseball commissioner Bud Selig announced that the league's Outstanding DH Award would be renamed after Martínez, and Washington governor Gary Locke named the following week "Edgar Martínez Week" in the state. Martínez won the Roberto Clemente Award after the 2004 season.

=== Career statistics ===
In 2,055 games over 18 seasons, Martínez posted a .312 batting average with 1,219 runs, 514 doubles, 15 triples, 309 home runs, 1,261 RBI, 49 stolen bases, 1,283 walks, a .418 on-base percentage, and a .515 slugging percentage. Defensively, he recorded an overall .952 fielding percentage primarily as a third baseman. In 34 postseason games, he batted .266 (34-for-128) with 16 runs, 7 doubles, 8 home runs, 24 RBI and 19 walks.

=== Legacy ===
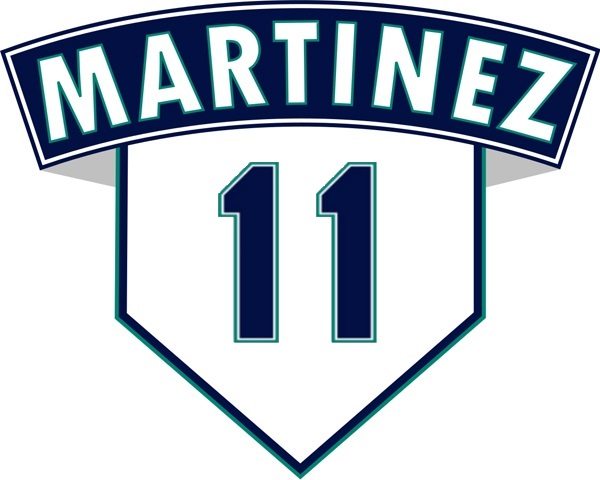
Edgar Martínez's number 11 was retired by the Seattle Mariners in 2017.

Hall of Fame pitcher Mariano Rivera, when asked whether there was anyone he was afraid to face, said that he was never afraid, but "I will put it like this: The only guy that I didn't want to face, when a tough situation comes, was Edgar Martínez. The reason is because I couldn't get him out. (laughs) I couldn't get him out. It didn't matter how I threw the ball. I couldn't get him out. Oh, my God, he had more than my number. He had my breakfast, lunch and dinner. He got everything from me." Versus Rivera, Martínez was able to log a .579 batting average, with 11 hits during 19 at bats. Hall of Fame pitcher Pedro Martínez (no relation) also named Edgar Martínez as one of the toughest hitters he had to pitch against in his career because, Pedro said, he was very disciplined at the plate and "would foul off pitches that would wipe out anybody else."

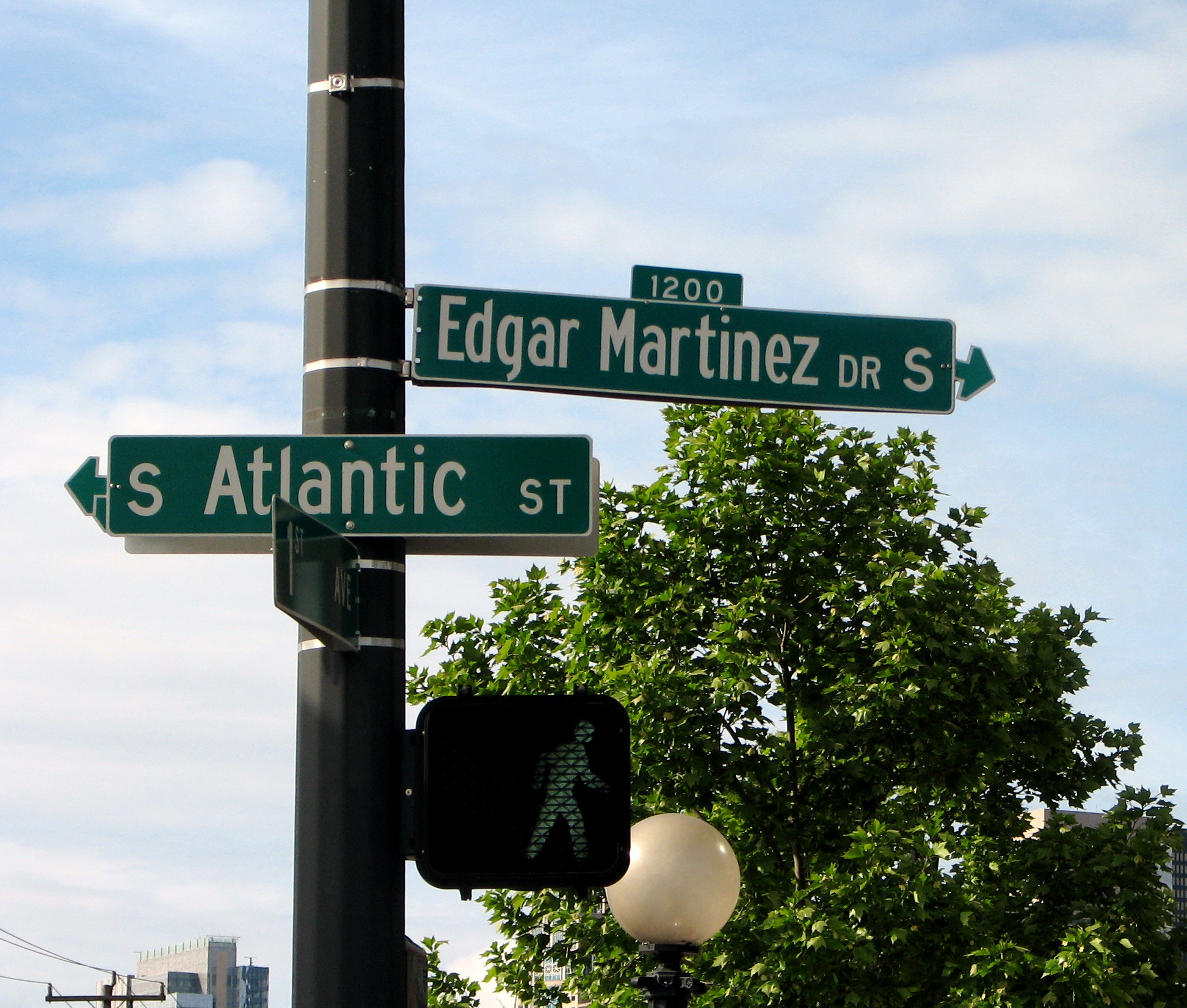
Edgar Martínez Drive in Seattle.

Martínez was inducted into the Hispanic Heritage Baseball Museum Hall of Fame on September 9, 2003, in a pregame on field ceremony at Safeco Field. In October 2004, following his retirement, a section of South Atlantic Street (State Route 519) in Seattle adjacent to Safeco Field was renamed Edgar Martínez Drive South. The street he grew up on in Dorado was renamed Edgar Martínez Street. At his retirement ceremony, a portrait "featuring his high stepping batting style" painted by artist Michele Rushworth was presented to him by the Mariners. MLB also renamed the Outstanding Designated Hitter Award in Martínez's honor. In 2005, fans voted Martínez as the third baseman on the Latino Legends Team. Following his retirement, the Mariners did not issue Martínez' uniform number 11 to any other player. Under team policy, he was not eligible to have his uniform number formally retired until 2010, when he became eligible for the National Baseball Hall of Fame for the first time. The Mariners inducted Martínez into the Seattle Mariners Hall of Fame on June 2, 2007 and retired Martinez's #11 jersey on August 12, 2017.

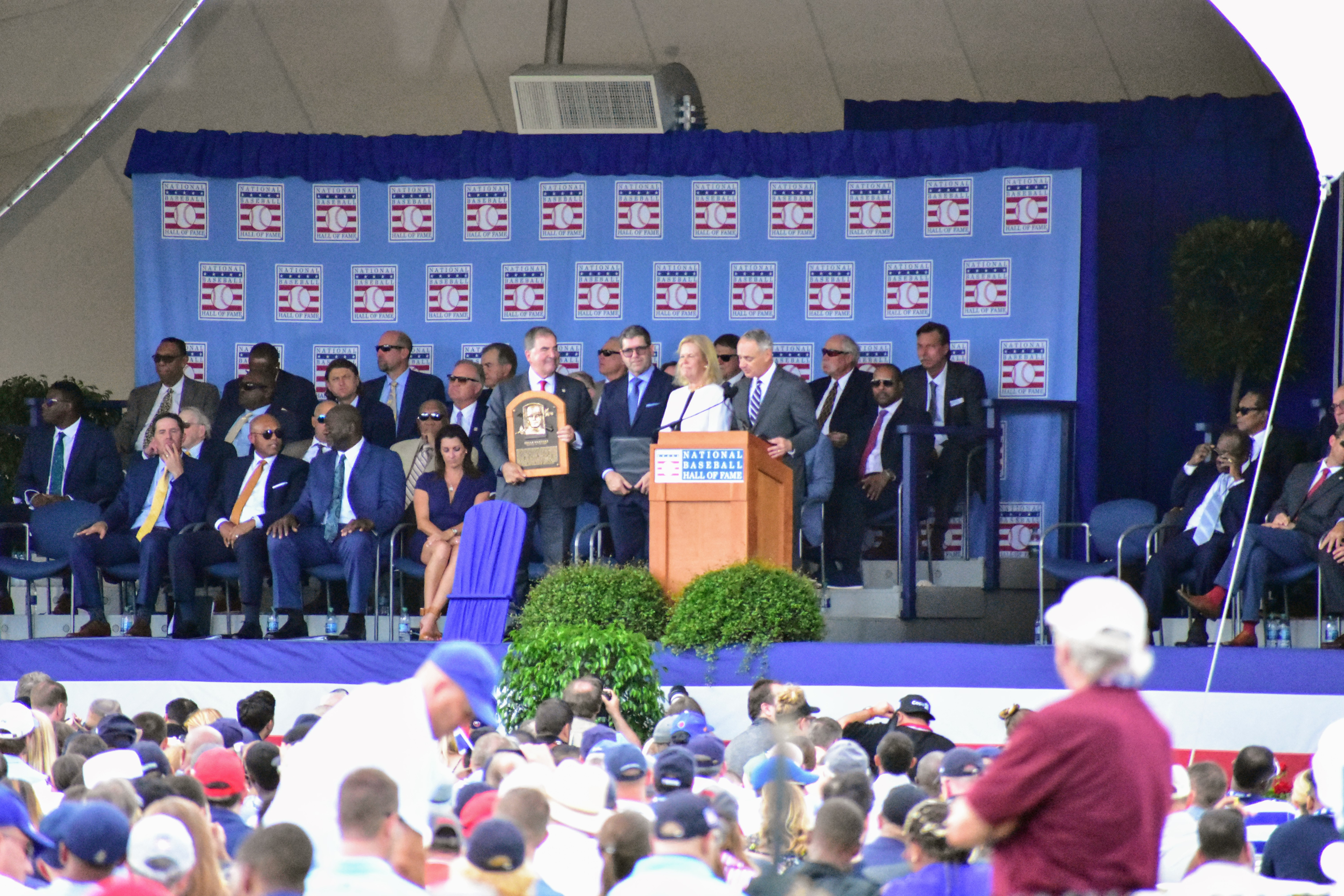
Martínez receiving his plaque during his induction ceremony into the Baseball Hall of Fame in 2019

First eligible to be elected into the Hall of Fame on the 2010 ballot, Martínez received 36.2% of the vote, far short of the 75% required for induction. While some sports writers felt that his batting numbers do not overcome the one-dimensional aspect of his career as a DH, others have compared this to the specialty of closers whose contribution to their teams victories resides on working one inning to preserve an advantage and the fact that these late inning relievers are not involved in other facets of the game such as hitting and base running. By the 2018 Baseball Hall of Fame balloting, his ninth year on the ballot, Martínez's vote total increased to 70.4%. The 2019 ballot, his last chance for election by the Baseball Writers' Association of America, elected him to the Hall of Fame, appearing on 85.4% of the ballots cast. He became the second player to enter the Hall of Fame as a Mariner, after Ken Griffey Jr., and the sixth player to be elected in his final year of eligibility, after Red Ruffing, Joe Medwick, Ralph Kiner, Jim Rice, and Tim Raines. He entered the Hall with Rivera, who was elected in his first year of eligibility, along with the late Roy Halladay (first ballot, posthumous). A statue of Martínez was installed outside Seattle's T-Mobile Park in 2021.

The Complejo Deportivo Edgar Martinez, named after Martínez, was built in barrio Higuillar in Dorado. Sustaining structural damages as a result of Hurricanes Maria and Irma in 2017, a $700,000 restoration of the sports complex was completed in 2021. The complex hosts school sports competitions and has a baseball field, a track field, a basketball court, and a gym.

== Coaching career ==
On June 20, 2015, the Mariners hired Martínez as their hitting coach, replacing Howard Johnson. The team's offense improved from a .233 batting average and 3.4 runs scored per game in the 68 games coached by Johnson to a .260 average and 4.6 runs per game with Martínez in 94 games. Though Jerry Dipoto, newly hired as general manager, fired Lloyd McClendon as manager after the season, he retained Martínez. Martínez coached the Mariners through to the end of the 2018 season. Out of a desire to spend more time with his family, Martínez moved from hitting coach to a hitting advisor role with the Mariners organization after the 2018 season.

Following the firing of hitting coach Jarret DeHart and manager Scott Servais on August 22, 2024, the Mariners announced that Martínez would be the team's hitting coach for the rest of the season. The team's hitting, particularly by Julio Rodríguez, improved after Martínez returned. On November 25, the team replaced Martínez with Kevin Seitzer as the hitting coach, but Martínez would remain with the Mariners in overseeing the club's hitting program.

== Personal life ==
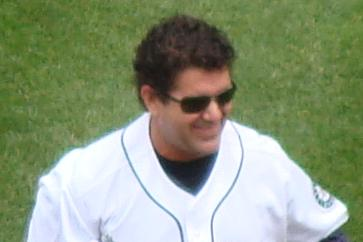
Martínez in 2009

Martínez met Holli (née) Beeler on a blind date in 1991; they married in October 1992. They live in Kirkland, Washington, with their three children.

Martínez and his wife Holli have contributed their time and money to Seattle Children's Hospital, including the Edgar Martínez Endowment for Muscular Dystrophy Research, established by the Mariners in honor of his retirement, and the Children's Hospital Annual Wishing Well Night at T-Mobile Park. Martínez has also supported the Parent Project Muscular Dystrophy, Overlake Hospital, Make-A-Wish Foundation, Wishing Star Foundation, United Way, Esperanza, Page Ahead Children's Literacy Program, Big Brothers Big Sisters, Boys & Girls Clubs of America, and Mariners Care. On June 20, 2007, Martínez was inducted into the World Sports Humanitarian Hall of Fame in Boise, Idaho.

Martínez has written two autobiographies. He wrote a children's book Edgar Martinez: Patience Pays with Greg Brown in 1992. In 2009, he wrote Edgar: An Autobiography with Seattle Times writer Larry Stone.

Martínez is one of the founders of Plaza Bank, founded in 2005 as Washington's first Hispanic bank. (The bank merged with United Business Bank in 2017.) In 2006, Martínez co-founded Branded Solutions, a corporate merchandise category, with two executives from ImageSource. He sold the company to ImageSource in 2010. For the 2013 season, the Mariners worked with Martínez, local chef Ethan Stowell, and bartender Anu Apte to create "Edgar's Cantina" at Safeco Field.

== See also ==
- List of Major League Baseball annual doubles leaders
- List of Major League Baseball annual runs batted in leaders
- List of Major League Baseball annual runs scored leaders
- List of Major League Baseball batting champions
- List of Major League Baseball career batting average leaders
- List of Major League Baseball career doubles leaders
- List of Major League Baseball career hits leaders
- List of Major League Baseball career home run leaders
- List of Major League Baseball career on-base percentage leaders
- List of Major League Baseball career OPS leaders
- List of Major League Baseball career runs batted in leaders
- List of Major League Baseball career runs scored leaders
- List of Major League Baseball career slugging percentage leaders
- List of Major League Baseball doubles records
- List of Major League Baseball players from Puerto Rico
- List of Major League Baseball players who spent their entire career with one franchise
- List of Puerto Ricans
- Seattle Mariners all-time roster

Awards and achievements
Preceded by Kirby Puckett; Manny Ramírez; Jermaine Dye; Alfonso Soriano	American League Player of the Month; July—August 1992; June 1995; May 2000; May 2003	Succeeded by Frank Thomas; G. Anderson; Albert Belle; Jason Giambi
