= Harold Baines =

American baseball player and coach (born 1959)

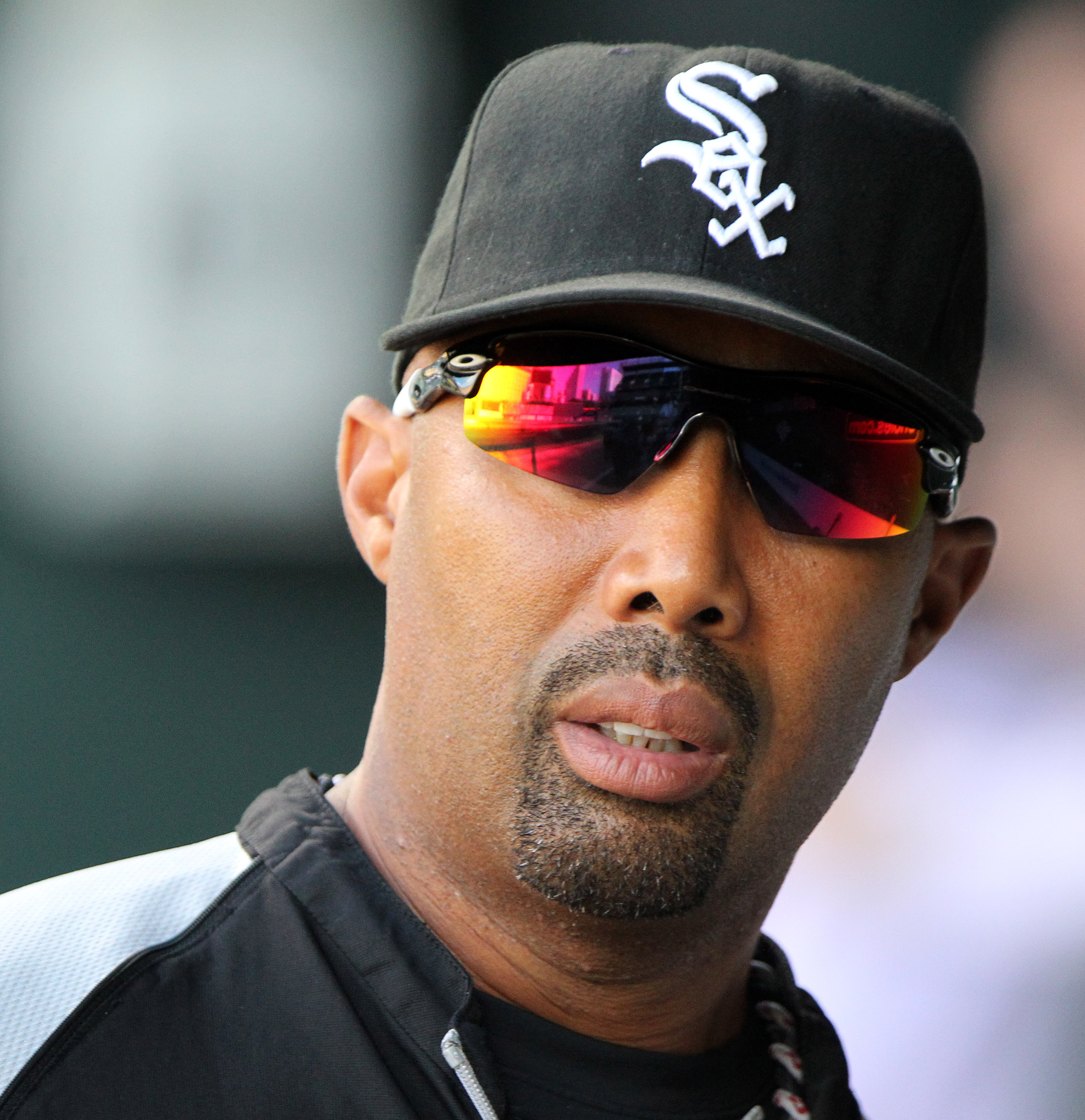
- Baines with the Chicago White Sox in 2011
- Designated hitter / Right fielder
- Born: March 15, 1959 (age 67); Easton, Maryland, U.S.
- Batted: Left Threw: Left

MLB debut
- April 10, 1980, for the Chicago White Sox

Last MLB appearance
- September 27, 2001, for the Chicago White Sox

MLB statistics
- Batting average: .289
- Hits: 2,866
- Home runs: 384
- Runs batted in: 1,628
- Stats at Baseball Reference

Teams
- As player: Chicago White Sox (1980–1989); Texas Rangers (1989–1990); Oakland Athletics (1990–1992); Baltimore Orioles (1993–1995); Chicago White Sox (1996–1997); Baltimore Orioles (1997–1999); Cleveland Indians (1999); Baltimore Orioles (2000); Chicago White Sox (2000–2001); As coach: Chicago White Sox (2004–2015)

Career highlights and awards
- 6× All-Star (1985–1987, 1989, 1991, 1999); World Series champion (2005); Silver Slugger Award (1989); Chicago White Sox No. 3 retired; Baltimore Orioles Hall of Fame

Member of the National

Baseball Hall of Fame
- Induction: 2019
- Vote: 75%
- Election method: Today's Game Era Committee

Harold Douglas Baines (born March 15, 1959) is an American former designated hitter and right fielder in Major League Baseball who played for five American League (AL) teams from 1980 to 2001, and is best known for his three stints with the Chicago White Sox. A Maryland native, he also played seven years with his hometown team, the Baltimore Orioles, over three separate periods. The first overall selection in the 1977 Major League Baseball draft and a six-time All-Star, Baines led the AL in slugging percentage in 1984. He held the White Sox team record for career home runs from 1987 until Carlton Fisk passed him in 1990; his total of 221 remains the club record for left-handed hitters, as do his 981 runs batted in (RBI) and 585 extra base hits with the team. His 1,688 hits and 1,643 games as a DH stood as major-league records until David Ortiz broke them in 2013 and 2014. He also held the mark for career home runs as a DH (236) until Edgar Martínez passed him in 2004.

One of the most durable, consistent, and respected hitters of his era, Baines batted over .300 eight times and hit .324 in 31 career postseason games, topping .350 in five separate series. Upon his retirement, he ranked seventh in AL history in games played (2,830) and 10th in RBI (1,628). Noted as well for his power hitting in clutch situations, he was tied for seventh in AL history in grand slams (13), fourth in three-home-run games (three), and tied for seventh in major league history in walk-off home runs (10). He served as a coach with the White Sox from 2004 to 2015 before moving into a role of team ambassador and spring training instructor. Baines was elected to the Baseball Hall of Fame by the Today's Game Era Committee as part of the class of 2019.

== Early life ==
Baines was raised in St. Michaels, Maryland, by his father, Linwood, a stonemason, with his three brothers and a sister. He described his father as his "idol, more than anybody else." His father was separated from his mother, Gloria. White Sox owner Bill Veeck began scouting Baines when he was just 12 years old while Veeck was living on the Eastern Shore of Maryland.

He graduated in 1977 from St. Michaels High School on Maryland's Eastern Shore where, as a senior, he batted .532 and was named a high school All-American. The White Sox made Baines the first overall selection in the 1977 amateur draft. He received a signing bonus of $32,000 – a record low for a first overall pick.

== Professional career ==
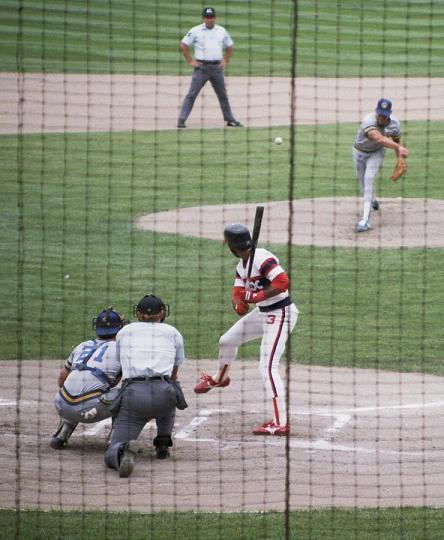
Baines took a high step with his right leg, a la Mel Ott, as part of his stride into a pitch.

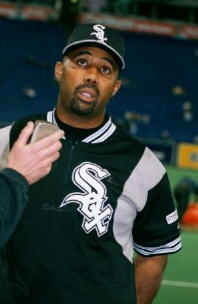
Baines before a 2001 game

On April 10, 1980, Baines made his major league debut on Opening Day, starting in right field and going 0-for-4 in a 5–3 loss to the Baltimore Orioles. In 1982, he batted .271 with 25 home runs and 105 RBI in 161 games. The 1983 season saw Baines reach the postseason with the White Sox, with Baines batting .280. On September 17, Baines drove three runs in for the Sox against the Seattle Mariners, which included a walk-off sacrifice fly that gave them the win and helped clinch the American League West division title, which was their first playoff appearance since the 1959 pennant winning team.

In 1984, baseball writer Bill James called Baines his favorite opposing player to watch, saying, "He is gorgeous, absolutely complete. I've seen him drop down bunts that would melt in your mouth, come up the next time and execute a hit and run that comes straight off the chalkboard. I've seen him hit fastballs out of the yard on a line, and I've seen him get under a high curve and loft it just over the fence." Baines ended the longest game in major league history (eight hours and six minutes over 25 innings on successive evenings) with a walk-off home run against the Milwaukee Brewers' Chuck Porter on May 8, 1984; the bat he used is currently kept at the Baseball Hall of Fame.

In 1986, a succession of knee problems began which gradually ended his fielding career, forcing him to become a regular designated hitter. He suffered a right knee injury in September when he tried to reach first base and saw his foot step on the pitcher's ankle that was on the bag. He finished with his fifth consecutive 20-HR season to become the first White Sox in franchise history to do so in franchise history. He spent half of 1987 spring training rehabbing from an arthoscopic procedure that became the first of eight knee surgeries. Despite the knee ailments and the resulting lack of speed, he remained a powerful hitter, picking up 166 hits in 1988.

Baines holds the record for the most seasons by a player between 100-RBI seasons, with 14 seasons between 113 RBIs for Chicago in 1985 and 103 for Baltimore and Cleveland in 1999.

Midway through the 1989 season, the Texas Rangers acquired Baines, along with Fred Manrique, from the White Sox in a much-derided trade which sent Wilson Álvarez, Scott Fletcher and Sammy Sosa to Chicago. After the trade, the White Sox retired Baines's #3 on August 20, 1989, a rare occurrence for a player who was still active in the major leagues (the number would be "un-retired" each time Baines returned to the White Sox, and he wore it as a coach). Baines finished the decade with 1,547 hits, which ranked sixth to all players in the 1980s.

On August 29, 1990, Baines was traded to the Oakland Athletics for minor league pitchers Scott Chiamparino and Joe Bitker, and he helped them reach the postseason only to be swept by the Cincinnati Reds in the World Series. In 1992, the Athletics returned to the playoffs, but lost to the Toronto Blue Jays in the ALCS.

On January 14, 1993, Baines was traded by the Athletics to the Baltimore Orioles for minor league pitchers Bobby Chouinard and Allen Plaster. Baines batted .313, .294 and .299 over his first three seasons with Baltimore. On December 11, 1995, Baines returned to the White Sox as a free agent. On July 29, 1997, Baines was traded back to the Orioles for a player to be named later. He helped the Orioles reach the playoffs, where they lost to the Cleveland Indians in the League Championship Series.

Baines represented the Orioles in the 1999 All Star Game. On August 27, 1999, he was traded to the Cleveland Indians for minor league pitcher Juan Aracena and a player to be named later. On December 9, 1999, Baines returned for a third stint with the Orioles, signing a one-year, $2 million contract. He was traded back to the White Sox with catcher Charles Johnson in exchange for Miguel Felix, Juan Figueroa, Brook Fordyce and Jason Lakman on July 29, 2000.

He played a total of 32 games in the 2001 season. In June, he was put on the disabled list for a strained left hip flexor after trying to elude an inside pitch that saw speculation that he was close to retiring. He returned for one final game on September 27, where he appeared as a pinch-hitter in the seventh innign and struck out in his one at-bat that proved to be his final game. He finished his career with 2,866 hits, 384 home runs and 1,628 RBI. He was in the top 40 for hits, home runs, and RBIs when he retired, with his RBIs being 21st in MLB history (he now ranks 34th as of 2026). One of 44 players with eleven 20-HR seasons at the time, he also led all players in home runs for players who played at least 50 percent of their games as a designated hitter; his 979 RBIs at the position were topped by Edgar Martinez in 2004. A dedicated hitter, his batting average was higher with runners on base (.306) than with the bases empty (.275). He batted .324 in the postseason with five home runs and 16 RBIs.

=== Coaching career ===
Baines's fourth stint with the Chicago White Sox began when he was named bench coach in March 2004 under new manager Ozzie Guillén, his White Sox teammate, from 1985 to 1989 and in 1996–97. Baines served as the team's interim manager for four games, from August 17–20, 2004, while Guillén was serving two consecutive two-game suspensions.

In 2005, as a coach for the White Sox, he earned a World Series ring when the White Sox won the World Series.

== Honors ==
Baines's number 3 was retired by the Chicago White Sox in 1989.

On July 20, 2008, the White Sox unveiled a bronze statue of Baines at U.S. Cellular Field prior to their game against the Kansas City Royals; it is the seventh statue featured on the park's outfield concourse.

In August 2009, the Orioles announced that Baines would be inducted into the Orioles Hall of Fame as the 46th member. In his seven seasons with the Orioles, he batted .301 with 107 home runs and 378 RBI as their designated hitter.

=== Hall of Fame candidacy ===
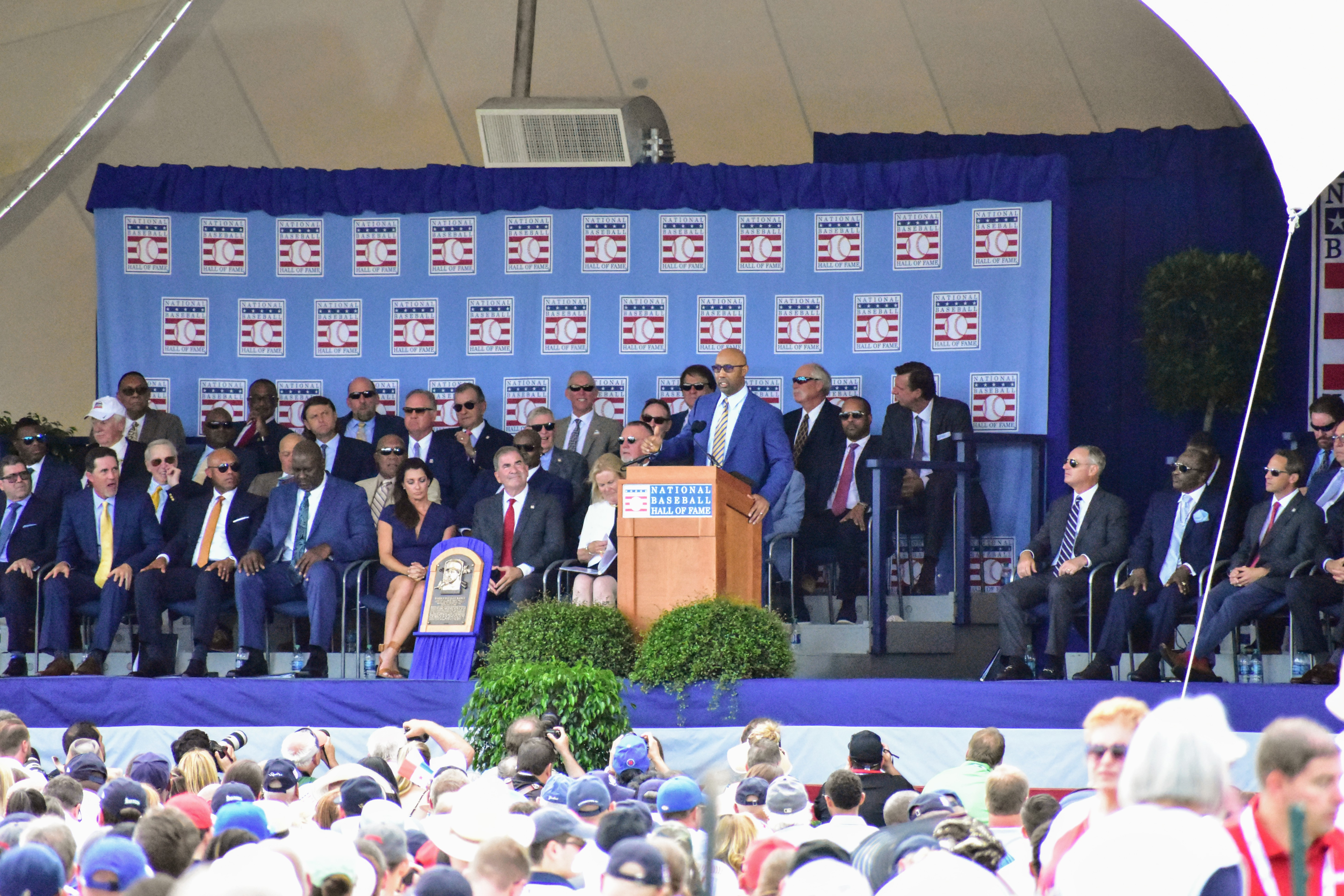
Baines giving a speech at his induction into the Baseball Hall of Fame in July 2019

Baines first became eligible for the National Baseball Hall of Fame with the 2007 election. While 75% of the vote is needed for induction, he never received greater than 6.1% (which he received in 2010). On January 5, 2011, Baines received just 28 votes (4.8%) in the 2011 Hall of Fame election, dropping him off all future writers' Hall of Fame ballots by receiving less than 5% of the vote.

On December 9, 2018, Baines was elected to the National Baseball Hall of Fame Class of 2019 via the Today's Game Era ballot, a voting panel of 16 consisting of six players, one manager, six executives, and three journalists. His election drew criticism from baseball writers and fans due to his low wins above replacement numbers, poor performance in MVP voting, and lack of defensive playing time. Baines was voted into the Hall of Fame by his peers: he played against five of the six players on the committee, while a sixth served as manager against him. Four executives on the panel were in management while Baines was a player and his former manager and team owner also were on the committee. Specific criticism was leveled at Tony La Russa, Jerry Reinsdorf, and Pat Gillick for their close personal relationships with Baines; La Russa managed him for seven seasons in Chicago and three more with Oakland, Reinsdorf owned the White Sox when Baines played, and Gillick acquired him for the Orioles during his time as the team's general manager. When asked about Baines, La Russa admitted the "very candid" discussions in the voting process while also comparing Baines to Alan Trammell in terms of being an underrated player and that "his record can't be denied" (he also argued that Baines, who fell 134 hits short of 3,000, would've likely reached the milestone if he was not hindered by the baseball strikes of 1981 and 1994 that cost him a minimum of 125 games). Reinsdorf, concurring with La Russa on the hits matter (while also noting Baines and his place among recent inductees that had spent time playing in the DH position such as Frank Thomas and David Ortiz), defended the sanctity of the committee that did not have "lobbying" for any one player and noting that they voted by secret ballot. Baines noted his surprise and gratefulness at hearing the news:

I was very surprised. I mean, Edgar [Martinez] is the first DH to go in. So I wasn’t sitting home worried about whether I’d ever make it into the Hall of Fame. I don’t think any player plays this game for the main reason of getting into the Hall of Fame. But I’m very grateful for this honor, for sure.

He and five other players were inducted into the Hall of Fame on July 21 before a crowd of 55,000, including 53 previous inductees. As of 2025, Baines is one of only four former first-overall MLB draft picks to be elected to the Hall of Fame, along with Ken Griffey Jr., Chipper Jones, and Joe Mauer.

== Personal life ==
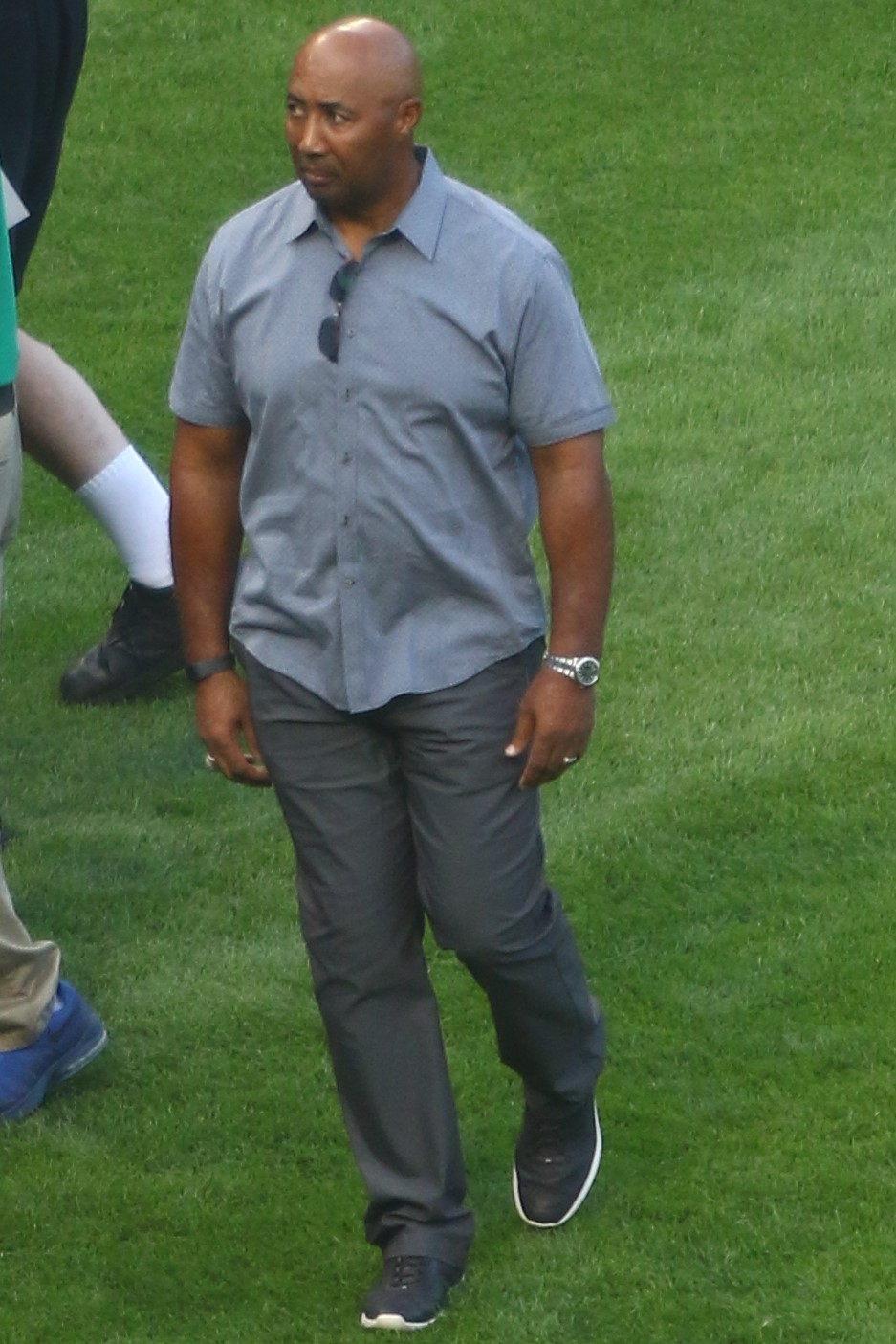
Baines in 2017 at Guaranteed Rate Field

Baines's hometown of St. Michaels has designated January 9 as Harold Baines Day. He has also created the Harold Baines Scholarship Fund to help deserving college-bound students.

Baines is married to Marla Henry and has four children: Toni, Britni, Harold, Jr., and Courtney. All attended Baines's alma mater, St. Michaels Middle/High School.

In May 2021, Baines had to undergo emergency surgery for both heart and liver transplants on successive days. Both organs had been damaged by amyloidosis, the condition that his father had. Baines (the son) had learned of this disease a couple of years earlier. The surgeries were successful.

== See also ==
- List of Major League Baseball career home run leaders
- List of Major League Baseball career hits leaders
- List of Major League Baseball career doubles leaders
- List of Major League Baseball career runs scored leaders
- List of Major League Baseball career runs batted in leaders
- List of Major League Baseball career total bases leaders

Preceded by Joe Nossek	Chicago White Sox Bench coach 2004–2005	Succeeded by Tim Raines
Preceded by Tim Raines	Chicago White Sox First base coach 2006–2015	Succeeded by Daryl Boston
