= 2009 Baseball Hall of Fame balloting =

Elections to the Baseball Hall of Fame

National Baseball

Hall of Fame and Museum
- New inductees: 3
- via BBWAA: 2
- via Veterans Committee: 1
- Total inductees: 289
- Induction date: July 26, 2009

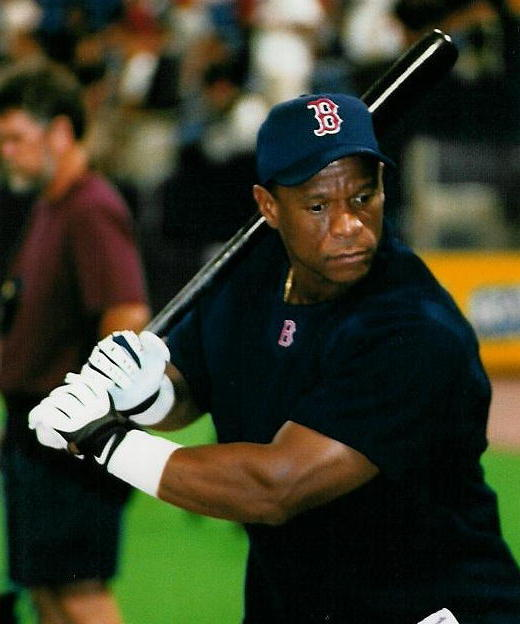
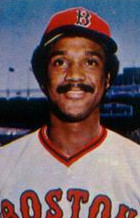
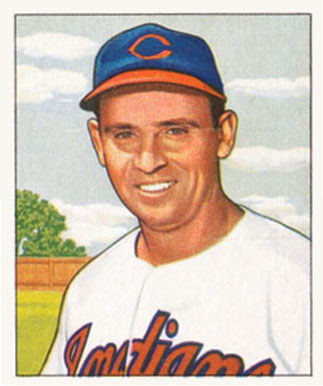
2009 inductees (L-R): Rickey Henderson, Jim Rice, and Joe Gordon

Elections to the Baseball Hall of Fame for 2009 proceeded according to revised rules enacted in 2001 and further revamped in 2007. The Baseball Writers' Association of America (BBWAA) held an election to select from among recent players, and elected Jim Rice and Rickey Henderson.

In keeping with the 2007 rules changes, the Veterans Committee held an election for players who were active in the years 1943 to 1987, but not before or after that period; for the fourth consecutive election cycle, this election produced no selections. An election to select from among players who were active prior to 1943 was conducted by a separate Veterans Committee panel of 12 Hall of Famers, writers, and baseball historians, chosen by the Hall of Fame's Board of Directors, and this election produced the first player selection by the Veterans Committee since 2001, Joe Gordon. An election to select managers, umpires and executives had been held for the 2008 inductions; the next such election was held prior to the 2010 inductions.

Induction ceremonies in Cooperstown were held July 26, 2009, with Commissioner Bud Selig presiding.

== BBWAA election ==
The BBWAA was again authorized to elect players active in 1989 or later, but not after 2003; the ballot, announced on December 1, 2008, included candidates from the 2008 ballot who received at least 5% of the vote but were not elected, along with selected players, chosen by a screening committee, whose last appearance was in 2003. All 10-year members of the BBWAA were eligible to vote; ballots had to be returned by December 31.

Voters were instructed to cast votes for up to 10 candidates; any candidate who received votes on at least 75% of the ballots would be honored with induction to the Hall. Results of the 2009 election by the BBWAA were announced on January 12. The ballot consisted of 23 players, the lowest number ever; there were 13 candidates returning from the 2008 ballot, also a record low.

539 ballots were cast (including two ballots which supported no candidates), with 405 votes required for election. A total of 2,902 individual votes were cast, an average of 5.38 per ballot. Those candidates who received less than 5% of the vote will not appear on future BBWAA ballots, but may eventually be considered by the Veterans Committee.

Candidates who were eligible for the first time are indicated here with a dagger (†). The candidates who received at least 75% of the vote and were elected are indicated in bold italics; candidates who have since been selected in subsequent elections are indicated in italics. The candidates who received less than 5% of the vote, thus becoming ineligible for future BBWAA consideration, are indicated with an asterisk (*).

Tommy John and Jim Rice were on the ballot for the 15th and final time; Rice became the first player elected in his final year of BBWAA ballot eligibility since Ralph Kiner in 1975, while John's eligibility ran out.

Player	Votes	Percent	Change	Year
**Rickey Henderson**†	511	94.8	–	1st
**Jim Rice**	412	76.4	▲4.2%	15th
Andre Dawson	361	67.0	▲1.1%	8th
Bert Blyleven	338	62.7	▲0.8%	12th
Lee Smith	240	44.5	▼1.2%	7th
Jack Morris	237	44.0	▲1.1%	10th
Tommy John	171	31.7	▲2.6%	15th
Tim Raines	122	22.6	▼1.7%	2nd
Mark McGwire	118	21.9	▼1.7%	3rd
Alan Trammell	94	17.4	▼1.8%	8th
Dave Parker	81	15.0	▼0.1%	13th
Don Mattingly	64	11.9	▼3.9%	9th
Dale Murphy	62	11.5	▼2.3%	11th
Harold Baines	32	5.9	▲0.7%	3rd
Mark Grace†*	22	4.1	–	1st
David Cone†*	21	3.9	–	1st
Matt Williams†*	7	1.3	–	1st
Mo Vaughn†*	6	1.1	–	1st
Jay Bell†*	2	0.4	–	1st
Jesse Orosco†*	1	0.2	–	1st
Ron Gant†*	0	0	–	1st
Dan Plesac†*	0	0	–	1st
Greg Vaughn†*	0	0	–	1st

Key
	Elected to the Hall of Fame on this ballot (named in **bold italics**).
	Elected subsequently, as of 2026 (named in plain italics).
	Renominated for the 2010 BBWAA election by adequate performance on this ballot and has not been elected, as of 2026.
	Eliminated from annual BBWAA consideration by poor performance or expiration on this ballot and has not been elected, as of 2026.
†	First time on the BBWAA ballot.
*	Eliminated from annual BBWAA consideration by poor performance or expiration on this ballot.

The newly eligible candidates included 22 All-Stars (12 of whom were not included on the ballot), who were selected a combined total of 58 times – a slight increase from 2008, when 17 All-Stars who had been selected a total of 43 times became eligible. Rickey Henderson, a 10-time All-Star, was the only new candidate who was selected more than five times. The ballot included two MVPs (Henderson and Mo Vaughn), and one Cy Young Award-winner and perfect game thrower (David Cone), none of them winning more than once.

Players eligible for the first time who were not included on the ballot were: Steve Avery, Jason Bere, Mike Bordick, John Burkett, Omar Daal, Joe Girardi, Mark Guthrie, Joey Hamilton, Bill Haselman, Darren Holmes, Trenidad Hubbard, Todd Hundley, Brian L. Hunter, Félix José, Chad Kreuter, Graeme Lloyd, Keith Lockhart, Albie Lopez, Pat Mahomes, Al Martin, Orlando Merced, Charles Nagy, Denny Neagle, Troy O'Leary, Lance Painter, Dean Palmer, Craig Paquette, Tom Prince, Jeff Reboulet, Rick Reed, Rich Rodriguez, Terry Shumpert, Luis Sojo, Dave Veres, Matt Walbeck, Mike Williams and Kevin Young.

None of the newly eligible candidates would appear on any future ballots. As expected, Henderson was elected on his first appearance; no other first-timer received the 5% of votes required to remain on the ballot. As a result, the 2010 ballot broke the record set this year for fewest returning candidates, with only 11 players returning.

== Veterans Committee ==
=== 1943 and later ===
Rules for election by the Veterans Committee were revised in July 2007 following complaints that the three elections conducted under the previous format (in 2003, 2005, and 2007) had resulted in no selections. After the February 2007 election, Bud Selig expressed frustration over the ongoing difficulties, and voiced his support for a revision of the process. Under the revised format, a Historical Overview Committee composed of 11 sportswriters appointed by the BBWAA's Board of Directors met in spring 2008 to develop a ballot of 20 former players active between 1943 and 1987; the committee members were: Dave Van Dyck (Chicago Tribune); Bob Elliott (Toronto Sun); Rick Hummel (St. Louis Post-Dispatch); Steve Hirdt (Elias Sports Bureau); Moss Klein (formerly Newark Star-Ledger); Bill Madden (New York Daily News); Ken Nigro (formerly Baltimore Sun); Jack O'Connell (MLB.com); Nick Peters (The Sacramento Bee); Tracy Ringolsby (Rocky Mountain News); and Mark Whicker (The Orange County Register). A six-member panel of Hall of Famers also met to independently select five players for consideration; these lists were merged to create a preliminary ballot of 21 names: Dick Allen, Ken Boyer, Bert Campaneris, Rocky Colavito, Mike Cuellar, Steve Garvey, Gil Hodges, Jim Kaat, Ted Kluszewski, Mickey Lolich, Roger Maris, Lee May, Minnie Miñoso, Thurman Munson, Tony Oliva, Al Oliver, Vada Pinson, Ron Santo, Luis Tiant, Joe Torre and Maury Wills.

Following the elections of 2003 through 2007, when the voting membership of the Veterans Committee included not only the living members of the Hall but also recipients of the Ford C. Frick Award and J. G. Taylor Spink Award, voting was now limited to Hall members; they met at the Hall during induction weekend in 2008, and reduced the ballot to 10 names through voting by mail in August. This final ballot was then sent to the 64 living members, and they voted by mail, casting votes for up to four candidates each. Any candidate receiving votes on 75% of ballots would be inducted to the Hall; a maximum of five inductees was possible. The final ballot was announced on September 16; all ten finalists were returnees from the 2007 final ballot. Results were announced on December 8 at Major League Baseball's winter meetings in Las Vegas, Nevada, but no candidate received the necessary number of votes. All 64 eligible voters cast ballots, with 48 votes required for election. Players elected in subsequent years are indicated in plain italics.

Player	Votes	Percent
Ron Santo	39	60.9%
Jim Kaat	38	59.4%
Tony Oliva	33	51.6%
Gil Hodges	28	43.8%
Joe Torre	19	29.7%
Maury Wills	15	23.4%
Luis Tiant	13	20.3%
Vada Pinson	12	18.8%
Al Oliver	9	14.1%
Dick Allen	7	10.9%

A total of 213 votes were cast for the 10 candidates, an average of 3.33 votes per ballot cast, suggesting that most voters cast votes for the maximum number of candidates but that the votes were too scattered for any one candidate to reach the required number. Although Hall of Fame officials had hoped that reducing the field of candidates on the final ballot from approximately 25 names to 10 would help focus attention on the most popular candidates and increase the chances of a selection, the coinciding move to reduce the allowable number of votes per ballot from ten to four appeared to counteract any potential benefit, as every candidate but one saw his percentage of the vote drop from 2007 (Tiant improved slightly from 18.3% to 20.3%).

Hall of Fame chairwoman Jane Forbes Clark stated, "When our board of directors restructured the Veterans Committee after the 2007 election, it did so with the goal of ensuring the voters – the living Hall of Famers – would review their peers. The 10 post-1942 ballot finalists all spent a substantial part of their playing career in the 1960s or the 1970s, and a vast majority of the voters were either actively playing, managing or involved in baseball in those two decades." She added, "The process was not redesigned with the goal of necessarily electing someone, but to give everyone on the ballot a very fair chance of earning election through a ballot of their peers. The vote reinforces the selections of the Baseball Writers' Association of America and maintains the high standards set by the BBWAA. A 75-percent threshold is extremely difficult to attain, but the highly selective process helps ensure that enshrinement in the Baseball Hall of Fame remains the greatest honor in the game."

Former manager Dick Williams, who had been inducted into the Hall earlier in the year, noted, "It's not our job to vote someone in," and added, "It's our job to consider the candidates." Noting his support for some of the candidates, he stated, "I thought Kaat would get in. I voted for him. And I think Joe Torre will, too, when he's done managing. I missed quite a few times before I got in. I know what that's like."

In announcing the lack of selections from this ballot, Hall president Jeff Idelson noted that the Hall's board of directors would review the results at its annual spring meeting, in keeping with their regular practice, and consider whether to further alter the selection process; he stressed that this was the first use of the new process featuring a smaller voting body and a reduced ballot. He added that the voting levels indicated that the members believed there were worthy candidates for induction, although no agreement could be reached as to the best ones. Hall member Joe Morgan, also a member of the Hall's board, argued that the current members were not trying to keep candidates out, but observed that the addition of strong new candidates each election might have the effect of reducing the support for any single player.

The ballot was composed almost entirely of players who were active in the 1960s and 1970s, with all but Hodges being active during the period from 1967 to 1972 (Hodges was a manager in that time period); even among the 21 players initially considered, only six had their rookie seasons before 1958, and only Hodges, Ted Kluszewski and Minnie Miñoso debuted before 1955. Other players who were on the 2007 ballot who were eligible for consideration were Bobby Bonds, Curt Flood, Sparky Lyle and Don Newcombe. In addition to Ken Boyer, Rocky Colavito, Kluszewski, Roger Maris, Miñoso and Newcombe, other potential candidates whose rookie seasons were before 1958 were Billy Pierce, perhaps the American League's top pitcher in the mid-1950s, Roy Face, the National League's first great reliever, and Dick Groat, a solid-hitting shortstop who was the NL's MVP in 1960.

Among the players who were eligible for the first time were Dusty Baker, Vida Blue, Ron Cey, Cecil Cooper, George Foster, Steve Garvey, Bobby Grich, Dave Kingman, Davey Lopes and Bill Madlock, with only Garvey being included among the 21 semifinalists.

In addition to improving on the fruitless outcome of the previous three elections for players, there may have been particular urgency in the 2009 vote resulting in the selection of one or more new members, as in 2011 a large group of potentially popular candidates would become eligible – possibly further diluting the support for any single candidate. Under the then-current Veterans Committee rules, those becoming eligible in 2011 would have included Buddy Bell, Dave Concepción, Ron Guidry, Tommy John, Graig Nettles and Ted Simmons; another sizable group of potentially popular candidates, including Bob Boone, Dwight Evans, Keith Hernandez, Fred Lynn, Dave Parker and Dan Quisenberry, would have become eligible in 2013.

As it turned out, this would be the last election for the Veterans Committee in this particular form. In July 2010, the Hall announced a new voting procedure to consider individuals not eligible for the BBWAA ballot. Starting with the elections for 2011 induction, the Veterans Committee was split into three 16-member subcommittees, each made up of Hall of Famers, executives, baseball historians, and media members. Each subcommittee votes once every three years on candidates from a composite ballot including both long-retired players and non-playing personnel. The ballots and subcommittees were divided by era, with the first vote involving figures from what the Hall calls the "Expansion Era" (1973 and later). The following year saw candidates considered from the "Golden Era" (1947–1972), with candidates from the "Pre-Integration Era" (1871–1946) following in the 2013 election. The first player elected under the new procedure was Ron Santo, elected in 2011 by the Golden Era subcommittee as part of the class of 2012.

=== Pre-1943 ===
For the first and ultimately only time, a separate election was held for players whose major league careers began before 1943; these elections are scheduled to occur every five years. The election was conducted on December 7, 2008 at the winter meetings in Las Vegas, among a committee of twelve Hall members and members of the media, with results announced the following day; votes by proxy would be allowed only in emergencies, but this was not necessary. The Historical Overview Committee of the BBWAA selected 10 candidates to appear on the ballot, with votes from 75% of the committee necessary for election; each committee member could vote for up to four candidates, allowing for a maximum of five selections. The final ballot was announced on August 25; the candidate who received at least 75% of the vote and was elected is indicated in bold italics.

Player	Votes	Percent
**Joe Gordon**	10	83.33%
Allie Reynolds	8	66.67%
Wes Ferrell	6	50%
Mickey Vernon	5	41.67%
Deacon White	5	41.67%
Bucky Walters	4	33.33%
Sherry Magee	3	25%
Bill Dahlen	<3	
Carl Mays	<3	
Vern Stephens	<3	

The committee members apparently made an effort to vote for as many candidates as they were allowed, casting at least 41 of a possible 48 individual votes (vote totals for three candidates were not released), for a minimum possible average of 3.42 votes per ballot.

Of the ten final candidates, none were living; Vernon was alive at the time the final ballot was announced, but died a month later. The finalists included candidates spanning the entire period from 1868 (White) to 1960 (Vernon), although six of the ten were active in the 1940s; four of the top five finishers were active in the 1940s, with the four pre-1930 candidates gaining no more than 12 total votes.

The voting committee comprised:

- Hall of Famers: Bobby Doerr, Ralph Kiner, Phil Niekro, Robin Roberts, Duke Snider, Don Sutton, Dick Williams
- Executives: Roland Hemond
- Writers: Furman Bisher, Steve Hirdt of Elias Sports Bureau, Bill Madden, ESPN news editor Claire Smith.

The Historical Overview Committee was permitted to nominate candidates who played in the Negro leagues prior to 1946, as long as their time in the Negro leagues and major leagues totals at least ten seasons; this rule would seem to include players such as Minnie Miñoso (who debuted with the New York Cubans in 1945) and Don Newcombe (who debuted with the Newark Eagles in 1944), even if they did not appear in the Negro leagues until after 1943. Negro league first baseman Buck O'Neil, whose playing career began in 1937, was eligible to be included on this ballot; however, if the overview committee believed that his contributions to baseball after his playing career ended outweigh his playing accomplishments, he could be instead considered in the election for non-players in 2010. The rules state that: "Those whose careers entailed involvement as both players and managers/executives/umpires will be considered for their overall contribution to the game of Baseball; however, the specific category in which such individuals shall be considered will be determined by the role in which they were most prominent. In those instances when a candidate is prominent as both a player and as a manager, executive or umpire, the BBWAA Screening Committee shall determine that individual's candidacy as either a player (Players Ballot), or as a manager, umpires, executive or pioneer (Managers/Umpires Ballot, or Executives/Pioneers Ballot)."

Because of the 2010 changes to Veterans Committee voting, this would be the only vote of the pre-1943 committee.

== J. G. Taylor Spink Award ==
The J. G. Taylor Spink Award has been presented by the BBWAA at the annual summer induction ceremonies since 1962. It recognizes a sportswriter "for meritorious contributions to baseball writing". The recipients are not members of the Hall of the Fame, merely featured in a permanent exhibit at the National Baseball Museum, but writers and broadcasters commonly call them "Hall of Fame writers" or words to that effect.

Three final candidates, selected by a three-member BBWAA committee, were named on July 15, 2008 in New York City in conjunction with All-Star Game activities: Nick Peters of The Sacramento Bee, Dave Van Dyck of the Chicago Tribune, and Bob Elliott of the Toronto Sun. All 10-year members of the BBWAA were eligible to cast ballots in voting conducted by mail in November.

On December 10 at baseball's winter meetings, Nick Peters was announced as the recipient. Peters, who covered the San Francisco Giants from 1961 to 2007, received 210 votes out of the 447 ballots cast, with Elliott receiving 123 votes and Van Dyck receiving 107; seven blank ballots were submitted.

== Ford C. Frick Award ==
The Ford C. Frick Award has been presented at the annual summer induction ceremonies since 1978. It recognizes a broadcaster for "major contributions to baseball". The recipients are not members of the Hall of the Fame, merely featured in a permanent exhibit at the National Baseball Museum, but writers and broadcasters commonly call them "Hall of Fame broadcaster" or words to that effect.

To be eligible, an active or retired broadcaster must have a minimum of 10 years of continuous major league broadcast service with a ball club, a network, or a combination of the two.

Ten finalists were announced on October 6, 2008. In accordance with guidelines established in 2003, seven were chosen by a 20-member committee composed of the 15 living recipients, along with 5 additional broadcasting historians and columnists: Bob Costas (NBC), Barry Horn (The Dallas Morning News), Stan Isaacs (formerly of New York Newsday), Ted Patterson (historian) and Curt Smith (historian). The seven finalists chosen by the committee were: Billy Berroa, Ken Coleman, Dizzy Dean, Lanny Frattare, Tony Kubek, Graham McNamee and Dave Van Horne. Three additional candidates – Tom Cheek, Jacques Doucet and Joe Nuxhall – were selected from a list of 210 candidates through results of voting by fans conducted throughout September at the Hall's official website, with 145,138 ballots cast.

On December 9 at baseball's winter meetings, it was announced that Tony Kubek would be the recipient. Kubek, who was a television analyst for NBC, the Toronto Blue Jays and the New York Yankees from 1965 until his 1994 retirement, became the first recipient of the Frick Award whose broadcasting career was solely in television (1995 recipient Bob Woolf is best known as a television play-by-play man, but has also worked in radio), and also the first recipient to have called games for a Canadian team. He was selected in a November vote by the same committee which selected the finalists. They voted by mail, and based the selection on the following criteria: longevity; continuity with a club; honors, including national assignments such as the World Series and All-Star Games; and popularity with fans.
