= 2007 Baseball Hall of Fame balloting =

Elections to the Baseball Hall of Fame

National Baseball

Hall of Fame and Museum
- New inductees: 2
- via BBWAA: 2
- Total inductees: 280
- Induction date: July 29, 2007

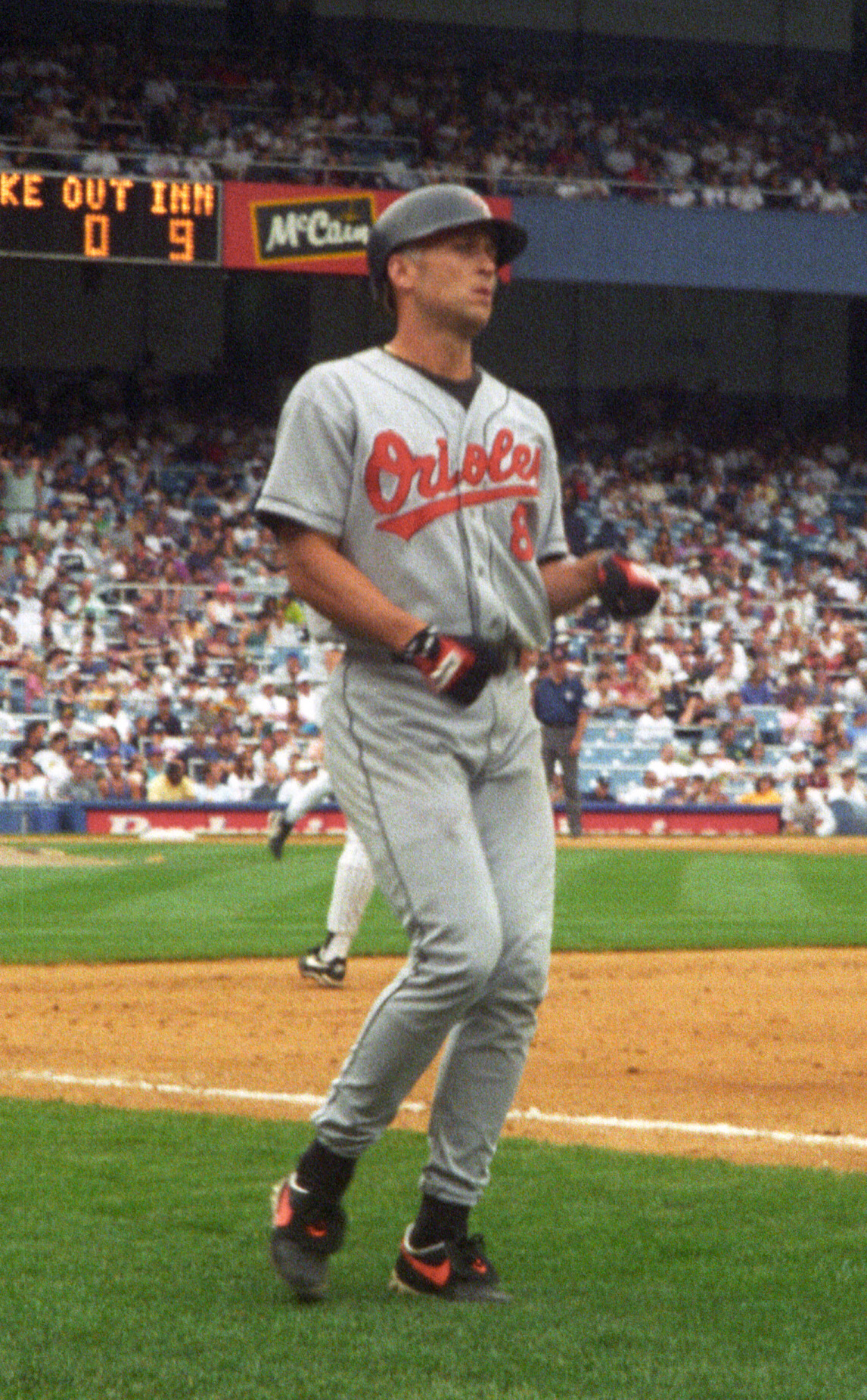
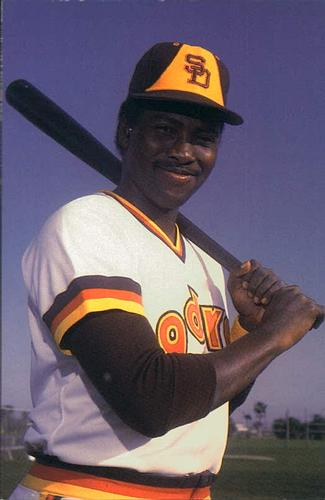
2007 inductees Cal Ripken Jr. (left) and Tony Gwynn

Elections to the Baseball Hall of Fame for 2007 proceeded according to revised rules enacted in 2001. The Baseball Writers' Association of America (BBWAA) held an election to select from among recent players, resulting in the induction of Tony Gwynn and Cal Ripken Jr.

The Veterans Committee held an election with two ballots: the biennial election for players retired over 20 years, and the quadrennial election for non-players (managers, umpires and executives), the first since 2003. The Committee did not elect anyone.

Induction ceremonies in Cooperstown were held July 29 with Commissioner Bud Selig presiding.

== BBWAA election ==
The BBWAA was again authorized to elect players active in 1987 or later, but not after 2001; the ballot announced on November 27, 2006, included candidates from the 2006 ballot who received at least 5% of the vote but were not elected, along with selected players, chosen by a screening committee, whose last appearance was in 2001. All 10-year members of the BBWAA were eligible to vote.

Voters were instructed to cast votes for up to 10 candidates; any candidate who received votes on at least 75% of the ballots would be honored with induction to the Hall. Results of the 2007 election by the BBWAA were announced on January 9. The ballot consisted of 32 players; a record 545 ballots were cast, with 409 votes required for election. A total of 3584 individual votes were cast, an average of 6.58 per ballot. Those candidates who received less than 5% of the vote will not appear on future BBWAA ballots but may eventually be considered by the Veterans Committee.

Candidates who were eligible for the first time are indicated here with a dagger (†). There were 15 candidates returning from the 2006 ballot. The two candidates who received at least 75% of the vote and were elected are indicated in bold italics; candidates who have since been selected in subsequent elections are indicated in italics. The candidates who received less than 5% of the vote, thus becoming ineligible for future BBWAA consideration, are indicated with an asterisk (*).

Steve Garvey was on the ballot for the 15th and final time.

| Player | Votes | Percent | Change | Year |
|---|---|---|---|---|
| **Cal Ripken Jr.**† | **537** | **98.5** | - | 1st |
| **Tony Gwynn**† | **532** | **97.6** | - | 1st |
| Goose Gossage | 388 | 71.2 | ▲6.6% | 8th |
| Jim Rice | 346 | 63.5 | ▼1.3% | 13th |
| Andre Dawson | 309 | 56.7 | ▼4.3% | 6th |
| Bert Blyleven | 260 | 47.7 | ▼5.6% | 10th |
| Lee Smith | 217 | 39.8 | ▼5.2% | 5th |
| Jack Morris | 202 | 37.1 | ▼4.1% | 8th |
| Mark McGwire† | 128 | 23.5 | - | 1st |
| Tommy John | 125 | 22.9 | ▼6.7% | 13th |
| Steve Garvey | 115 | 21.1 | ▼4.9% | 15th |
| Dave Concepción | 74 | 13.6 | ▲1.1% | 14th |
| Alan Trammell | 73 | 13.4 | ▼4.3% | 6th |
| Dave Parker | 62 | 11.4 | ▼3.2% | 11th |
| Don Mattingly | 54 | 9.9 | ▼2.4% | 7th |
| Dale Murphy | 50 | 9.2 | ▼1.6% | 9th |
| Harold Baines† | 29 | 5.3 | - | 1st |
| Orel Hershiser* | 24 | 4.4 | ▼6.8% | 2nd |
| Albert Belle* | 19 | 3.5 | ▼4.2% | 2nd |
| Paul O'Neill†* | 12 | 2.2 | - | 1st |
| Bret Saberhagen†* | 7 | 1.3 | - | 1st |
| José Canseco†* | 6 | 1.1 | - | 1st |
| Tony Fernández†* | 4 | 0.7 | - | 1st |
| Dante Bichette†* | 3 | 0.6 | - | 1st |
| Eric Davis†* | 3 | 0.6 | - | 1st |
| Bobby Bonilla†* | 2 | 0.4 | - | 1st |
| Ken Caminiti†* | 2 | 0.4 | - | 1st |
| Jay Buhner†* | 1 | 0.2 | - | 1st |
| Scott Brosius†* | 0 | 0.0 | - | 1st |
| Wally Joyner†* | 0 | 0.0 | - | 1st |
| Devon White†* | 0 | 0.0 | - | 1st |
| Bobby Witt†* | 0 | 0.0 | - | 1st |

Key
| | Elected to the Hall of Fame on this ballot (named in **bold italics**). |
| | Elected subsequently, as of 2026 (named in plain italics). |
| | Renominated for the 2008 BBWAA election by adequate performance on this ballot and has not been elected, as of 2026. |
| | Eliminated from annual BBWAA consideration by poor performance or expiration on this ballot and has not been elected, as of 2026. |
| † | First time on the BBWAA ballot. |
| * | Eliminated from annual BBWAA consideration by poor performance or expiration on this ballot. |

The newly eligible candidates included 26 All-Stars, eight of whom were selected at least five times, and ten of whom were not even included on the ballot. For only the second time (equalling 1982), three players with 400 home runs were among the new candidates; the five newly eligible players with 300 home runs were a new high (exceeding the 1980 total), and the twelve new candidates with 200 home runs shattered the previous high mark of eight, set in 1992. With the exception of the first balloting in 1936, it was the second time that two players with 3000 hits debuted on the ballot (Tony Gwynn and Cal Ripken Jr.), and also the second time that two players with 1500 RBI made their initial appearances (Ripken and Harold Baines). Again excepting 1936, the numbers of newly eligible candidates with 2000 hits (7), 2500 hits (3), 1000 RBI (9), 1200 RBI (5), 3000 total bases (11), 3500 total bases (5) or 4000 total bases (3) all tied or broke previous records. The field included three MVP Award Winners (Ken Caminiti, Jose Canseco, and Cal Ripken Jr., who won the award twice), one Cy Young Award winner (Bret Saberhagen, twice awarded), and four Rookie of the Year Award winners (Cal Ripken Jr., Mark McGwire, Jose Canseco, and Gregg Olson, who was not even on the ballot). As expected, Gwynn and Ripken were elected on the first ballot; the other first-time candidates were generally seeking simply enough votes to remain on the ballot for the 2008 election, when a much less crowded field was expected. However, of the first-timers who were not elected, only two—McGwire and Baines—received enough votes to make the 2008 ballot, and had Baines received two fewer votes, he also would have become ineligible for BBWAA consideration.

Players eligible for the first time who were not included on the ballot were: Derek Bell, Willie Blair, Brian Bohanon, Ricky Bones, Jeff Brantley, Norm Charlton, Chad Curtis, Rob Ducey, Mark Gardner, Bernard Gilkey, Craig Grebeck, Darryl Hamilton, Pete Harnisch, Charlie Hayes, Doug Henry, Gil Heredia, Glenallen Hill, Ken Hill, John Jaha, Stan Javier, Randy Knorr, Mark Leiter, Mark Lewis, Dave Magadan, Dave Martinez, Ramón Martínez, Chuck McElroy, Alan Mills, Omar Olivares, Joe Oliver, Gregg Olson, Scott Radinsky, Pat Rapp, Pete Schourek, Scott Servais, Jeff Shaw, Bill Spiers, Ed Sprague, Kevin Tapani, Eddie Taubensee, Turner Ward, John Wehner, and Rick Wilkins.

=== Steroid debate ===
Performance-enhancing substances, which had made headlines in the sport for the past several years, became a factor in voting for the first time. Two MVP winners who later admitted to steroid use – José Canseco and Ken Caminiti – were both among the first-time candidates. More prominently, McGwire was appearing on the ballot for the first time; considered a highly likely first-ballot selection following his record-setting home run feats in the late 1990s, his candidacy was heavily debated more recently as observers of the sport considered both his admitted use of legal dietary supplements (particularly androstenedione, which he stopped using in 1998 and was banned in 2004), as well as suspicions in some quarters that he had also used steroids (which he ultimately admitted in 2010 to having used for much of his career, including 1998). The voters took these matters into consideration, individually determining how recent offensive totals should be regarded by the Hall, as the first players from the sport's offensive explosion in the late 1990s now began to appear on the ballot in significant numbers.

In November 2006, the Associated Press received responses from 125 baseball writers they had asked about their voting plans; about 3/4 of those who had decided were against electing McGwire, at least for the time being.

New York Daily News sportswriter Bill Madden, who has also been part of the Veterans Committee selection process since 2003, said he will not vote for any player he even suspects of using steroids, citing the ballot guidelines which include a player's integrity as being among the five criteria voters should consider: "I'm not voting for any of those guys – Bonds, McGwire, Sosa, Palmeiro, any of them. I draw the line at eyeball evidence and what I personally believe. I had three Hall of Famers come up to me at Cooperstown ... and they all said the same thing, 'We're looking to you guys to uphold the integrity of this place.'" He added, "If the Hall of Fame doesn't want me or any other writers to take a stand, then take that clause out of the ballot. I plan to invoke that clause."

USA Today writer Bob Nightengale stated that even proof of steroid use would not cause him to withhold his vote, noting, "So many other guys were taking them, including pitchers. So it's almost like a level playing field ... everybody was allowed to cheat, you still choose the best of that particular era." He nonetheless indicated that he would likely withhold his vote from McGwire for at least a year or two, saying, "The biggest trouble I have with McGwire, he hit so many home runs in such a short period of time. It's not like he was a consistent Hall of Famer his whole career."

In contrast, Tony La Russa – McGwire's manager for all but one and a half years of his 16-season career – has said, "Without question, I believe he belongs there on the first ballot. You're talking about a long and distinguished career." (McGwire was indeed an All-Star in all but two seasons from 1987 through 2000, and had already finished seventh or higher in the MVP voting three times before his 1998 record season.) La Russa also reiterated his belief that McGwire had never used steroids, saying, "I know people are struggling with how to put it in perspective. I don't know where it goes. I don't know how people weigh. I don't know how the public feels. To me, the issue is the player that I saw for years and years. I believe in him. And that's where I leave it."

MLB.com sportswriter Barry Bloom, noting that the supplements McGwire has admitted using were permitted in baseball at the time, stated that he would vote for McGwire and any other qualified candidate against whom there is no empirical evidence of steroid use, saying, "They knew he was doing [androstenedione] and they didn't do anything at the time. Regardless of what happened since, I can't assume McGwire did anything."

St. Louis sportswriter Rob Rains said he will not vote for McGwire until he apologizes, saying, "I want to hear that he's sorry for what he did. I still might not vote for him. But it would help."."

Writer and statistician John Thorn has cast a skeptical eye on writers who claim to be upholding a standard of integrity, observing that cheating for an advantage has always been a part of baseball, even among Hall of Famers such as Gaylord Perry and 19th-century star King Kelly: "This whole thing about McGwire simply permits sportswriters to imagine themselves to be Woodward and Bernstein, people who see themselves as guardians of a sacred portal, the last best hope for truth and justice - and it's all hogwash and baloney."

ESPN sportswriter Jayson Stark, who stated that he would vote for McGwire, noting the earlier election of Perry, said, "I think I'm stuck with evaluating what the sport allowed to happen on the field. Either the '90s happened or they didn't. Since they happened, and the hundreds of players using whatever they used leveled the playing field to some extent, I feel more comfortable voting for players like McGwire than I do trying to pick and choose who did what, and when, and why."

Chicago Tribune writer Ron Rapoport stated, "I'll vote for him. You can't rewrite the history of the game after the fact."

Washington Post columnist Thomas Boswell, noted for his extensive writings on baseball, suggested that waiting a few years is the ideal solution, saying, "Should we 'pardon' McGwire for accusations of steroid use that he has never actually admitted and for which no evidence exists?" (In keeping with Post rules regarding writers voting on awards, Boswell previously gave up his BBWAA voting rights.) Observing that candidates initially have 15 years in which to be elected, Boswell added, "McGwire's name will still be on the Hall of Fame ballot. But our perspective on him and the period in which he played may - for reasons we may not yet know - be far clearer than it is now."

Some writers were sharply critical of McGwire for his remarks in Congressional hearings in March 2005, in which he stated: "I will not participate in naming names and implicating my friends and teammates. Asking me, or any other player, to answer questions about who took steroids in front of television cameras will not solve this problem. If a player answers, 'No,' he simply will not be believed. If he answers, 'Yes,' he risks public scorn and endless government investigations." Many voters expressed concerns that his remarks constituted an implied confession. But Boswell defended McGwire's appearance, saying, "He didn't make a non-confession confession. He simply said he refused to join a witch hunt. ... That's still a permissible position in America, right?"

Sandy Alderson, general manager of the Oakland Athletics when McGwire starred for the team, and from 1998 to 2005 the executive vice president for baseball operations for Major League Baseball, has said he believes McGwire should be elected, adding that voters have a duty to bar steroid users; but he noted that "it's not clear all the writers have to come up with the gold standard they're going to apply for all years." La Russa said, "I can understand votes that are trying to send a message," but expressed his concern that "I'm afraid that message is personal to a guy I think deserves the induction." All-Star second baseman Jeff Kent stated, "I don't know where you draw the line," but added, "I applaud the Hall of Fame voters for stressing over this, because it's worth it. Because it matters. And it should matter."

The day before the results were announced, Paul Ladewski of the Chicago-area Daily Southtown (now known as the SouthtownStar) revealed that he had submitted a blank ballot (thus guaranteeing Gwynn and Ripken would not earn unanimous election), saying that he could not currently support any candidates who played primarily between 1993 and 2004, a period he termed the "Steroids Era." He also added,

Besides, what makes Gwynn and Ripken so special that they deserve to be unanimous selections? Walter Johnson, Cy Young and Honus Wagner didn't receive such Hall passes. Neither did Lou Gehrig, Babe Ruth and Ted Williams. In fact, nobody has in the history of the game. Based on the standards set by the Hall of Fame voters decades ago, is there a neutral observer out there who can honestly say Gwynn and Ripken should be afforded an unprecedented honor?

After the results of the writers' balloting were announced, Stark was sharply critical of most of the writers who chose not to vote for Ripken or Gwynn, though he mildly defended Ladewski's decision. On Ripken, he noted:

It sounds like a great thing to say that Cal Ripken attracted the third-highest vote percentage (98.53) of all time. But it's actually unfathomable — and indefensible — that it wasn't higher. There were two blank ballots submitted in this election, as steroid protest votes. But what's the excuse of those other six voters — none of whom had identified or explained themselves as of Tuesday afternoon? As someone who has said it makes more sense to vote for no players of that generation than it does to pick and choose based on guesses and suspicions, I at least have an understanding of why a voter would turn in a blank ballot. But there is no other responsible reason — none — to withhold a vote for Ripken.

The following day, Bill Shannon of Sports Press Service stated that he had not voted for Ripken or Gwynn, solely because he felt there were ten other worthy candidates who needed his vote more: "I thought they were such obvious candidates they didn't need my vote. I wasn't thinking in terms of a 100 percent."

As for Gwynn, Stark added:

And the same goes for Tony Gwynn, who should have been an easier choice than Ripken. Aside from the blank-ballot duo, 11 voters failed to vote for Gwynn — owner of the second-highest career [batting average] (.338) of any player whose career began in the last 75 years. (Only Ted Williams, at .344, is higher.) For even 11 writers not to have cast a vote for Gwynn is an embarrassment to the BBWAA.

Ladewski responded,

As a group, the voters have an obligation to uphold the Hall of Fame standards that were established decades ago. To say the least, I'm disappointed that some of my peers have caved in at a time when the bar needs to be raised, not lowered. Don't we need to ask more and tougher questions about performance-enhancers? Why the rush to judgment? At the very least, veteran players in the Steroids Era were aware of what went on around them, which made them accomplices to the worst scandal in baseball history. Lest we forget, that's the kind of thing that got Buck Weaver suspended for life without so much as a hearing."

Regarding those who refused to vote for McGwire, St. Louis Post-Dispatch writer Bernie Miklasz stood by his vote for him, and criticized those he termed self-appointed "morality police": "I saw what happened in 1998, I saw that it was good for the game, I saw the baseball establishment all approved of it, even though we all looked at McGwire and had some doubts about the source of his strength. I just don't believe a relatively short time later he should have to wear the scarlet letter."

And Rick Hummel, who had earlier been announced as the year's recipient of the J. G. Taylor Spink Award, said in defense of his vote for McGwire, "I don't have any evidence, and you are innocent until proven guilty. Are his stats worthy of the Hall? I think they are."

But some figures noted that McGwire's vote totals will likely increase with time, resulting in his eventual election. Pitcher Todd Jones wrote in his column in The Sporting News that failure to elect him would make the Hall look bad, rather than McGwire. Describing the voting writers as an angry mob, he agreed with McGwire's opinion that he would have drawn scorn and ridicule regardless of any testimony he had offered before Congress, and said, "Now that mob thinks it is teaching him a lesson." And Hall of Famer Juan Marichal stated that McGwire belongs in the Hall on the basis of his home run total, and indicated that he will eventually be selected by the Veterans Committee if not by the writers, saying, "Big Mac will be chosen for the Hall of Fame." However, the observers who said that McGwire's vote totals would increase with time have so far not been correct. McGwire's vote total has yet to increase beyond the 128 votes he received in this election; following his 2010 admission of steroid use, which came after the announcement of the 2010 election results, his support dropped from 128 that year to 115 in 2011. McGwire's vote totals have continued to fall since then; he only received 63 votes in the most recent election in 2014.

== Veterans Committee elections ==
Rules enacted in August 2001 provided that the Veterans Committee would be expanded from its previous 15 members, elected to limited terms, to include the full living membership of the Hall, including recipients of the Ford C. Frick Award and J. G. Taylor Spink Award. Elections for players retired over 20 years would be held every other year, with elections of non-players (managers, umpires and executives) held every fourth year on a "composite ballot". No candidates were elected from either ballot in 2003, nor from the players' ballot in 2005, leading to criticism from the press and public that the voters were being too restrictive in evaluating candidates. The Committee voted in 2007 on players who were active no later than 1985. Candidates were eligible for the composite ballot if they had been retired from the sport for five years, or if they were at least 65 years of age and had been retired for at least six months.

The Committee voted on players again in preparation for the 2009 inductions, but that election was conducted under significantly different rules enacted in July 2007. The most important changes were:

- The players ballot was restricted to players whose careers started in 1943 or later.
- The sole voting body was composed of living Hall of Fame members. Frick and Spink Award winners, who are considered "honorees", would no longer vote on the players ballot.
- The number of players to be considered was considerably reduced.
- A separate election was held for the 2009 inductions, to be repeated every five years thereafter, for players whose careers started before 1943. The voting body was a 12-member panel selected by the Hall of Fame Board.

For a more complete discussion of the changes, see the Veterans Committee article.

The Committee was scheduled to vote on non-players in 2011, but the July 2007 rules also dramatically affected the voting process for non-players. A 16-member panel of Hall of Famers, executives, and veteran media members voted on managers and umpires again prior to the 2008 inductions. A separate 12-member panel, drawn from the same sources as the managers/umpires panel but with a greater concentration of executives, simultaneously voted on executives. Both panels voted in the future for inductions in even-numbered years before further changes announced in 2010 that took effect with the 2011 elections.

=== Preliminary phase ===
In December 2005, a Historical Overview Committee of ten sportswriters appointed by the BBWAA's Board of Directors met at the Hall of Fame's library to develop a list of 200 former players who merited consideration for election but played no later than 1985, and a second list of 60 former managers, umpires and executives. They were provided with statistical information by the Elias Sports Bureau, official statistician for Major League Baseball since the 1920s, which also identified the 1,400 players with 10 or more years of play who were eligible.

The Historical Overview Committee comprised Dave Van Dyck (Chicago Tribune), Bob Elliott (Toronto Sun), Steve Hirdt (Elias Sports Bureau), Rick Hummel (St. Louis Post-Dispatch), Moss Klein (Newark Star-Ledger), Bill Madden (New York Daily News), Ken Nigro (former Baltimore Sun writer), Jack O'Connell (BBWAA officer and writer for The Hartford Courant), Nick Peters (The Sacramento Bee), and Mark Whicker (Orange County Register). Their lists of 200 players and 60 other contributors were announced April 3, 2006.

Players. († marks those newly eligible since 2005 (twelve). They last played in the majors during 1984 or 1985.)

Babe Adams - Joe Adcock - Dick Allen - Felipe Alou • Sal Bando - Dick Bartell - Ginger Beaumont - Mark Belanger - Wally Berger - Bobby Bonds - †Larry Bowa - Ken Boyer - Harry Brecheen - Tommy Bridges - Pete Browning - Charlie Buffinton - Lew Burdette - George H. Burns - George J. Burns • Dolph Camilli - Bert Campaneris - Bob Caruthers - George Case - Norm Cash - Phil Cavarretta - Spud Chandler - Ben Chapman - Rocky Colavito - Mort Cooper - Walker Cooper - Wilbur Cooper - Doc Cramer - Del Crandall - Gavvy Cravath - Lave Cross - Mike Cuellar • Bill Dahlen - Alvin Dark - Jake Daubert - Tommy Davis - Willie Davis - Paul Derringer - Dom DiMaggio - Patsy Donovan - Larry Doyle - Jimmy Dykes • Bob Elliott - Del Ennis - Carl Erskine • Elroy Face - Wes Ferrell - Freddie Fitzsimmons - Curt Flood - Bill Freehan - Jim Fregosi - Carl Furillo • Mike Garcia - Junior Gilliam - Jack Glasscock - Joe Gordon - Dick Groat - Heinie Groh • Stan Hack - Mel Harder - Jeff Heath - Tommy Henrich - Babe Herman - John Hiller - Gil Hodges - Ken Holtzman - †Burt Hooton - Willie Horton - Elston Howard - Frank Howard - Dummy Hoy • Larry Jackson - Jackie Jensen - Sam Jethroe - Bob L. Johnson - Joe Judge • Jim Kaat - Ken Keltner - Don Kessinger - Johnny Kling - Ted Kluszewski - †Jerry Koosman - Ray Kremer - Harvey Kuenn • Sam Leever - Mickey Lolich - Sherm Lollar - Eddie Lopat - Dolf Luque - †Greg Luzinski - Sparky Lyle • Sherry Magee - Sal Maglie - Jim Maloney - Firpo Marberry - Marty Marion - Roger Maris - Mike G. Marshall - Pepper Martin - Lee May - Carl Mays - Tim McCarver - Frank McCormick - Lindy McDaniel - Gil McDougald - Sam McDowell - †Tug McGraw - Stuffy McInnis - Denny McLain - Roy McMillan - Dave McNally - Andy Messersmith - Bob Meusel - Irish Meusel - Clyde Milan - Bing Miller - Stu Miller - Minnie Miñoso - Terry Moore - Tony Mullane - Thurman Munson - Bobby Murcer - Johnny Murphy - Buddy Myer • Art Nehf - Don Newcombe • Lefty O'Doul - Tony Oliva - †Al Oliver - Claude Osteen - †Amos Otis • Andy Pafko - Milt Pappas - Camilo Pascual - Ron Perranoski - Jim Perry - Johnny Pesky - Rico Petrocelli - Deacon Phillippe - Billy Pierce - Vada Pinson - Johnny Podres - Boog Powell • Jack Quinn • Vic Raschi - Ed Reulbach - Allie Reynolds - †Mickey Rivers - †Steve Rogers - Eddie Rommel - Charlie Root - Al Rosen - Schoolboy Rowe - Jimmy Ryan • Johnny Sain - Slim Sallee - Ron Santo - Wally Schang - George Scott - Rip Sewell - Bob Shawkey - Urban Shocker - Roy Sievers - Curt Simmons - †Ken Singleton - Reggie Smith - †Rusty Staub - Vern Stephens - Riggs Stephenson - Mel Stottlemyre - Harry Stovey • Jesse Tannehill - Fred Tenney - Bobby Thomson - Luis Tiant - Mike Tiernan - Joe Torre - Cecil Travis - Hal Trosky - Virgil Trucks • Johnny Vander Meer - George Van Haltren - Bobby Veach - Mickey Vernon • Dixie Walker - Bucky Walters - Lon Warneke - †Bob Watson - Will White - Cy Williams - Ken R. Williams - Maury Wills - Smoky Joe Wood - Wilbur Wood - Jimmy Wynn • Rudy York

Among the newly eligible players who were not included were Rick Monday, Bucky Dent, Jeff Burroughs, Lou Piniella, Richie Hebner, Mike Torrez, Paul Splittorff and Oscar Gamble. As in previous years, the 200 players were almost evenly divided between players retired less than 50 years (98 players retired from 1957 to 1985) and those retired over 50 years (102 players retired 1956 or earlier).

The list of 200 was almost identical to the list prepared for the 2005 election; apart from the twelve players who were newly eligible, only three players from the 1910s were added: left fielder Sherry Magee, center fielder Clyde Milan, and pitcher Slim Sallee. Perhaps due to the reliance on official statistics – often incomplete in the sport's early years – provided by the Elias Sports Bureau, the committee included very few players from the sport's first half-century, which remains poorly represented in the Hall; only 14 players were included who made their debut before 1893 (one fewer than in 2005). Although the Hall's current membership includes fewer than a dozen non-pitchers of the 1870s and 1880s, compared to nearly 50 from the 1930s and 1940s, the committee included over 40 more players from the period between 1920 and 1945, but only 7 who played primarily in the 25 years before 1893: first baseman/outfielder Harry Stovey, shortstop Jack Glasscock, outfielder Pete Browning, and pitchers Charlie Buffinton, Bob Caruthers, Tony Mullane and Will White. For the third time, Will White was included even though his brother Deacon (who is to be inducted in 2013) is widely accepted as having been a far greater player. In addition to Deacon White, stars of the 19th century who were omitted included Paul Hines, Deacon McGuire, Cupid Childs, Bobby Lowe, George Gore, Hardy Richardson, Ezra Sutton, Arlie Latham, Fred Pfeffer and Joe Start.

By primary fielding position the nominees were starting pitchers (67), relief pitchers (10), catchers (10), first basemen (21), second basemen (5), third basemen (11), shortstops (18), left fielders (17), center fielders (22) and right fielders (19).

Of the 15 players who were dropped from the 2005 list, nearly all were infielders (11) or pitchers (3), with Hank Sauer being the only outfielder; as had been true in earlier years, the list of preliminary candidates seemed to have been developed based on raw offensive totals, with less regard for defensive ability or considerations of era.

Contributors. The committee also named 60 managers, umpires and executives. († marks those newly eligible since 2005. Managers are denoted by (M), umpires by (U) and executives by (E).)

Gene Autry (E) - Buzzie Bavasi (E) - Samuel Breadon (E) - Charles Bronfman (E) - August Busch Jr. (E) - George W. Bush (E) - Roger Craig (M) - Harry Dalton (E) - Bing Devine (E) - Bill Dinneen (U) - Charles Dressen (M) - Barney Dreyfuss (E) - Chub Feeney (E) - John Fetzer (E) - Charles O. Finley (E) - Calvin Griffith (E) - Charlie Grimm (M) - Doug Harvey (U) - Garry Herrmann (E) - Whitey Herzog (M) - John Heydler (E) - Ralph Houk (M) - Bob Howsam (E) - Fred Hutchinson (M) - †Davey Johnson (M) - Ewing Kauffman (E) - Bowie Kuhn (E) - Frank Lane (E) - Billy Martin (M) - Gene Mauch (M) - John McSherry (U) - †Jack McKeon (M) - Marvin Miller (E) - Danny Murtaugh (M) - Hank O'Day (U) - Walter O'Malley (E) - Steve O'Neill (M) - Paul Owens (E) - Steve Palermo (U) - Gabe Paul (E) - Babe Pinelli (U) - Bob Quinn (E) - Alfred Reach (E) - Beans Reardon (U) - Paul Richards (M) - Cy Rigler (U) - Bill Rigney (M) - Jake Ruppert (E) - Ben Shibe (E) - Charles Somers (E) - Billy Southworth (M) - Bill Summers (U) - Chuck Tanner (M) - Birdie Tebbetts (M) - Chris von der Ahe (E) - Lee Weyer (U) - Bill White (E) - Dick Williams (M) - Phil Wrigley (E) - †Don Zimmer (M)

53 of the 60 nominees were holdovers from the 2003 list; along with the three newly eligible candidates, the four additions were Bing Devine, John McSherry, Jake Ruppert, and Charlie Grimm (who had been included on the players' list in both 2003 and 2005). The candidates include 31 individuals who were primarily executives, 19 who were managers, and 10 who were umpires. Davey Johnson, like Grimm, was dropped from the players' ballot after being included there in 2003 and 2005; evidently the review committee members regarded Johnson (age 63) as having been retired since 2000 even though he had managed the U.S. team in the 2005 Baseball World Cup, and served as a bench coach in the 2006 World Baseball Classic.

Some people eligible for the first time but not nominated were umpires Larry Barnett, Jim Evans, Rich Garcia, Dave Phillips and Harry Wendelstedt, and managers Jim Fregosi, Tom Kelly and Johnny Oates (Fregosi was included on the players' list).

=== Phase two ===
The Historical Overview Committee nominations were forwarded to a 60-member BBWAA screening committee comprising two writers from each major league city. In summer 2006 they elected 25 players and 15 contributors who would appear on the final ballots. (Everyone voted for 25 and 15 candidates from the two preliminary ballots.) Meanwhile, a committee of six Hall of Fame members independently selected five of the 200 nominated players who would appear on the final ballot, so the final ballots would comprise 25 to 30 players and 15 contributors.

Evidently the writers passed over two of the Hall of Fame members' five selections, for there were 27 on the final players ballot.

=== Final ballots ===
The final ballots were announced on September 28, 2006. 23 of the 25 players on the 2005 ballot returned, with Lefty O'Doul, Cecil Travis, Mickey Vernon and one newly eligible player added as well, replacing Elston Howard and Smoky Joe Wood. Those selected played primarily from the 1950s onward, with only six of the candidates having retired before 1960, and only three – pitchers Carl Mays and Wes Ferrell, and left fielder/pitcher O'Doul – having retired before 1947. The BBWAA screening committee failed to include any candidates from the era before 1910. This likely reflected a tendency among the voting writers to vote only for those players they had seen themselves, and to withhold votes from earlier players.

All 61 living members of the Hall were eligible to cast ballots in the final election, along with the 8 living recipients of the J. G. Taylor Spink Award (including Jack Lang, who died on January 25 after voting had begun), the 14 living recipients of the Ford C. Frick Award, and the sole additional member of the pre-2001 Veterans Committee whose term had not yet expired (John McHale). Balloting was conducted by mail in January 2007, with voters permitted to vote for up to 10 candidates from each ballot; all candidates who received at least 75% of the vote would be elected. Results of the voting by the Veterans Committee were announced on February 27.

There were 84 eligible voters. 82 cast ballots in the players election, with 62 votes required for election; 81 cast ballots in the composite election, with 61 votes required for election. In all, 489 individual votes were cast on the players ballot, for an average of 5.96 votes per ballot, while 338 individual votes were cast on the composite ballot, an average of 4.17 votes per ballot. For the third consecutive Veterans Committee election, no one was elected. Of the 23 players who were also on the 2005 ballot, 14 received fewer votes in 2007, with only Jim Kaat (9), Don Newcombe (9), Maury Wills (7) and Ron Santo (5) increasing their totals by at least five votes. The 27 candidates on the players' ballot, with one player newly eligible since 2005 indicated with a † and candidates who have since been elected in subsequent elections indicated in italics, were:

| Player | Votes | Percent |
|---|---|---|
| Ron Santo | 57 | 69.5% |
| Jim Kaat | 52 | 63.4% |
| Gil Hodges | 50 | 61.0% |
| Tony Oliva | 47 | 57.3% |
| Maury Wills | 33 | 40.2% |
| Joe Torre | 26 | 31.7% |
| Don Newcombe | 17 | 20.7% |
| Vada Pinson | 16 | 19.5% |
| Roger Maris | 15 | 18.3% |
| Lefty O'Doul | 15 | 18.3% |
| Luis Tiant | 15 | 18.3% |
| Curt Flood | 14 | 17.1% |
| Al Oliver† | 14 | 17.1% |
| Mickey Vernon | 14 | 17.1% |
| Minnie Minoso | 12 | 14.6% |
| Cecil Travis | 12 | 14.6% |
| Dick Allen | 11 | 13.4% |
| Marty Marion | 11 | 13.4% |
| Joe Gordon | 10 | 12.2% |
| Ken Boyer | 9 | 11.0% |
| Mickey Lolich | 8 | 9.8% |
| Wes Ferrell | 7 | 8.5% |
| Sparky Lyle | 6 | 7.3% |
| Carl Mays | 6 | 7.3% |
| Thurman Munson | 6 | 7.3% |
| Rocky Colavito | 5 | 6.1% |
| Bobby Bonds | 1 | 1.2% |

There were 15 candidates on the composite ballot, all of whom had been previously eligible. Again reflecting an emphasis on recent figures, all 15 were active in the sport in 1976 or later. The candidates, with the ten executives designated, the four managers designated and the sole umpire designated, and those who have since been selected in subsequent elections indicated in italics, were:

| Player | Category | Votes | Percent |
|---|---|---|---|
| Doug Harvey | Umpire | 52 | 63.4% |
| Marvin Miller | Executive | 51 | 62.2% |
| Walter O'Malley | Executive | 36 | 43.9% |
| Buzzie Bavasi | Executive | 30 | 37% |
| Dick Williams | Manager | 30 | 37% |
| Whitey Herzog | Manager | 29 | 36% |
| Bill White | Executive | 24 | 30% |
| Bowie Kuhn | Executive | 14 | 17% |
| August Busch Jr. | Executive | 13 | 16% |
| Billy Martin | Manager | 12 | 15% |
| Charles O. Finley | Executive | 10 | 12% |
| Gabe Paul | Executive | 10 | 12% |
| Paul Richards | Manager | 10 | 12% |
| Phil Wrigley | Executive | 9 | 11% |
| Harry Dalton | Executive | 8 | 10% |

=== Reaction ===
Following the third consecutive election in which there were no selections, and with only minimal gains by individual candidates over that period, Hall of Fame chairwoman Jane Forbes Clark suggested that the Hall's board of directors might make changes in the process before the next scheduled election in 2009, saying, "We are disappointed that no one has been elected in the three voting cycles. We will be evaluating this process and its trends at our next meeting, which is March 13, and discussing whether there should be any changes." She added, "The board may decide that the trends are not what we thought they were going to be. Perhaps this hasn't worked as well as some of the board members thought it would and maybe it needs a little bit of change." The board took no action at its March meeting, opting to continue discussions before its next meeting during induction weekend in July.

Hall of Fame member and vice chairman Joe Morgan tried to deflect criticism, saying, "We're being blamed because something hasn't happened. If you're asking me, 'Do we lower our standards to get more people in?' my answer would be no." Noting that he voted for the maximum 10 players, he added, "I feel there are some guys out there that belong in the Hall of Fame," but also said, "The writers voted on these people for 15 years and they weren't elected. Why are we being criticized because we haven't elected someone?"

Joe Torre, who received less than half the required number of votes (but was later elected in his first year of eligibility as a manager), expressed disappointment that no one was selected and said, "I'm not exactly sure what process they use. Don't forget, you've got the old guard and the young guard. People with different interests."

And Hall of Famer Mike Schmidt noted his support for Jim Kaat and observed that other members also had "their guys," admitting, "Maybe that is the problem when you are trying to evaluate 'bubble' players on entrance. The same thing happens every year. The current members want to preserve the prestige as much as possible, and are unwilling to open the doors."

Two months after the results were announced, Commissioner Bud Selig expressed puzzlement that figures such as Ron Santo had not been elected, and indicated that after three unsuccessful elections he now favored a revision in the voting method. Coincidentally or not, the aforementioned rules changes for the Veterans Committee election process were announced almost exactly three months after Selig's remarks.

== J. G. Taylor Spink Award ==
Rick Hummel received the J. G. Taylor Spink Award honoring a baseball writer. (The award was voted at the December 2006 meeting of the BBWAA, dated 2006, and conferred in the summer 2007 ceremonies.)

The Spink Award has been presented by the BBWAA at the annual summer induction ceremonies since 1962. It recognizes a sportswriter "for meritorious contributions to baseball writing". The recipients are not members of the Hall of the Fame, merely featured in a permanent exhibit at the National Baseball Museum, but writers and broadcasters commonly call them "Hall of Fame writers" or words to that effect. Living recipients were members of the Veterans Committee for elections in odd years 2003 to 2007.

Three final candidates, selected by a BBWAA committee, were named on July 11, 2006, in Pittsburgh in conjunction with All-Star Game activities: Rick Hummel of the St. Louis Post-Dispatch, Nick Peters of The Sacramento Bee, and Morris Siegel, a writer for four Washington, D.C. newspapers. All 10-year members of the BBWAA were eligible to cast ballots in voting conducted by mail in November.

On December 6 at baseball's winter meetings, Rick Hummel was announced as the recipient, having received 233 votes out of the 411 ballots cast, with Siegel receiving 112 votes and Peters receiving 66.

== Ford C. Frick Award ==
Denny Matthews received the Ford C. Frick Award honoring a baseball broadcaster.

The Frick Award has been presented at the annual summer induction ceremonies since 1978. It recognizes a broadcaster for "major contributions to baseball". The recipients are not members of the Hall of the Fame, merely featured in a permanent exhibit at the National Baseball Museum, but writers and broadcasters commonly call them "Hall of Fame broadcaster" or words to that effect. Living honorees were members of the Veterans Committee for elections in odd years 2003 to 2007.

To be eligible, an active or retired broadcaster must have a minimum of 10 years of continuous major league broadcast service with a ball club, a network, or a combination of the two; 195 candidates were eligible.

On December 5, 2006, the ten finalists were announced. In accordance with guidelines established in 2003, seven were chosen by a research committee at the museum: Tom Cheek, Dizzy Dean, Tony Kubek, France Laux, Denny Matthews, Graham McNamee and Dave Niehaus. Three additional candidates – Ken Harrelson, Bill King, and Joe Nuxhall – were selected through results of voting by fans conducted throughout November at the Hall's official website; more than 75,000 votes were cast.

On February 22, Denny Matthews was announced as the 2007 recipient; a broadcaster of Kansas City Royals games since the franchise was established in 1969, he was selected in a January vote by a committee composed of the 14 living recipients, along with six additional broadcasting historians or columnists: Bob Costas (NBC), Barry Horn (The Dallas Morning News), Stan Isaacs (formerly of New York Newsday), Ted Patterson (historian), Curt Smith (historian) and Larry Stewart (Los Angeles Times). The committee members voted by mail, and based the selection on the following criteria: longevity; continuity with a club; honors, including national assignments such as the World Series and All-Star Games; and popularity with fans.
