= 2005 Baseball Hall of Fame balloting =

Elections to the Baseball Hall of Fame

National Baseball

Hall of Fame and Museum
- New inductees: 2
- via BBWAA: 2
- Total inductees: 260
- Induction date: July 31, 2005

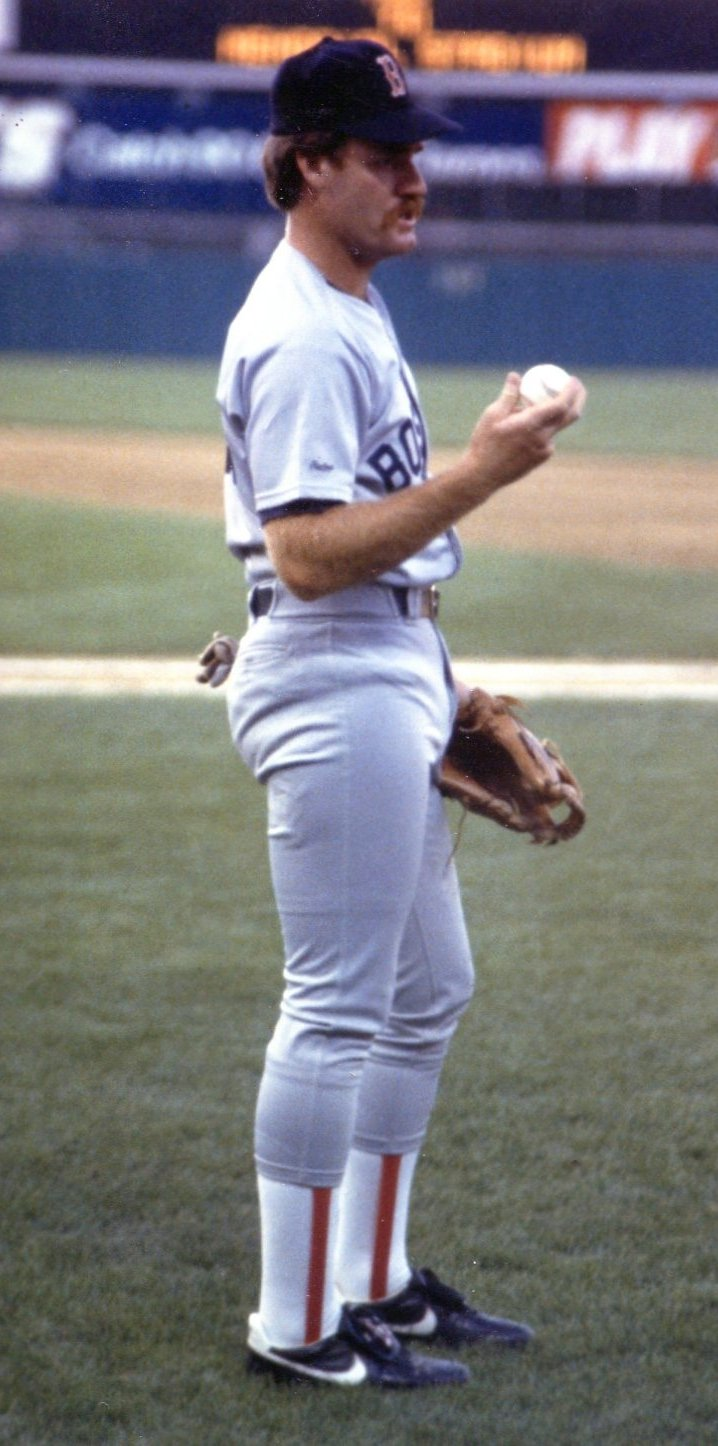
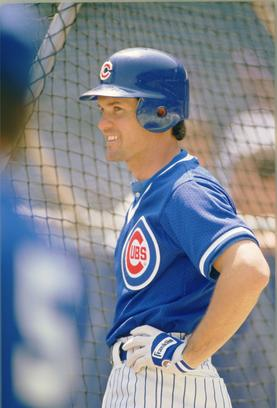
2005 inductees Wade Boggs (left) and Ryne Sandberg

Elections to the Baseball Hall of Fame for 2005 proceeded in keeping with rules enacted in 2001. The Baseball Writers' Association of America (BBWAA) held an election to select from recent players, voting Ryne Sandberg and Wade Boggs into the Hall. The Veterans Committee held a separate election to select from players retired more than 20 years, but did not elect anyone.

Induction ceremonies in Cooperstown were held July 31 with Commissioner Bud Selig presiding.

== BBWAA election ==
The BBWAA was again authorized to elect players active in 1985 or later, but not after 1999; the ballot included candidates from the 2004 ballot who received at least 5% of the vote but were not elected, along with selected players, chosen by a screening committee, whose last appearance was in 1999. All 10-year members of the BBWAA were eligible to vote.

Voters were instructed to cast votes for up to 10 candidates; any candidate receiving votes on at least 75% of the ballots would be honored with induction to the Hall. Results of the 2005 election by the BBWAA were announced on January 4. The ballot consisted of 27 players; 516 ballots were cast, with 387 votes required for election. A total of 3263 individual votes were cast, an average of 6.32 per ballot. Those candidates receiving less than 5% of the vote (26 votes) will not appear on future BBWAA ballots, but may eventually be considered by the Veterans Committee.

Candidates who were eligible for the first time are indicated here with a dagger (†). The two candidates who received at least 75% of the vote and were elected are indicated in bold italics; candidates who have since been selected in subsequent elections are indicated in italics. The candidates who received less than 5% of the vote, thus becoming ineligible for future BBWAA consideration, are indicated with an asterisk (*).

Player	Votes	Percent	Change	Year
**Wade Boggs**†	**474**	**91.8**	-	1st
**Ryne Sandberg**	**393**	**76.1**	▲15%	3rd
Bruce Sutter	344	66.6	▲7.1%	12th
Jim Rice	307	59.4	▲4.9%	11th
Goose Gossage	285	55.2	▲14.5%	6th
Andre Dawson	270	52.3	▲2.3%	4th
Bert Blyleven	211	40.8	▲5.4%	8th
Lee Smith	200	38.7	▲2.1%	3rd
Jack Morris	172	33.3	▲7%	6th
Tommy John	123	23.8	▲1.9%	11th
Steve Garvey	106	20.5	▼3.8%	13th
Alan Trammell	87	16.9	▲3.1%	4th
Dave Parker	65	12.5	▲2.1%	9th
Don Mattingly	59	11.4	▼1.4%	5th
Dave Concepción	55	10.6	▼0.7%	12th
Dale Murphy	54	10.4	▼1.9%	7th
Willie McGee†	26	5.0	-	1st
Jim Abbott†*	13	2.5	-	1st
Darryl Strawberry†*	6	1.1	-	1st
Jack McDowell†*	4	0.7	-	1st
Chili Davis†*	3	0.5	-	1st
Tom Candiotti†*	2	0.3	-	1st
Jeff Montgomery†*	2	0.3	-	1st
Tony Phillips†*	1	0.1	-	1st
Terry Steinbach†*	1	0.1	-	1st
Mark Langston†*	0	0.0	-	1st
Otis Nixon†*	0	0.0	-	1st

Key
	Elected to the Hall of Fame on this ballot (named in **bold italics**).
	Elected subsequently, as of 2026 (named in plain italics).
	Renominated for the 2006 BBWAA election by adequate performance on this ballot and has not been elected, as of 2026.
	Eliminated from annual BBWAA consideration by poor performance or expiration on this ballot and has not been elected, as of 2026.
†	First time on the BBWAA ballot.
*	Eliminated from annual BBWAA consideration by poor performance or expiration on this ballot.

The newly-eligible candidates included 10 All Stars (two of whom were not on the ballot), who were selected for a combined total of 43 times. Wade Boggs, a 12-time All Star, and Darryl Strawberry, an eight-time All Star, were the only new candidates selected five or more times. The ballot included one Rookie of the Year (Strawberry), one Cy Young Award-winner (Jack McDowell), and one MVP (Willie McGee).

Players eligible for the first time who were not included on the ballot were: Paul Assenmacher, Jeff Blauser, Mike Blowers, John Cangelosi, Jim Corsi, Rich DeLucia, Tony Fossas, Carlos García, Jack Howell, Darrin Jackson, Jeff King, Mike Macfarlane, Kirt Manwaring, Derrick May, Brian McRae, Eric Plunk, Mark Portugal, Mel Rojas, Paul Sorrento, and Dale Sveum.

Of the new players on the ballot, only Wade Boggs was elected; Willie McGee was the only other first-timer to receive enough votes to remain on the ballot, receiving the exact minimum (26) to stay eligible.

== Veterans Committee ==
Rules enacted in August 2001 provided that the Veterans Committee would be expanded from its previous 15 members, elected to limited terms, to include the full living membership of the Hall. Elections for players retired over 20 years would be held every other year, with elections of non-players (managers, umpires and executives) held every fourth year. No candidates were elected from either ballot in 2003. Following 2004, when no Veterans election was held, the Committee voted in 2005 on players who were active no later than 1983; the next such election was in 2007. There was no 2005 election for non-players; the last such election was in 2003, and the next was held in 2007.

=== Preliminary phase ===
In December 2003, a Historical Overview Committee of nine sportswriters appointed by the BBWAA's Board of Directors met at the Hall of Fame's library and nominated 200 players who were active in the major leagues no later than 1983. They were provided with statistical information by the Elias Sports Bureau, official statistician for Major League Baseball since the 1920s, which also identified the 1,400 players with 10 or more years of play who were eligible.

The Historical Overview Committee comprised Bob Elliott (Toronto Sun), Steve Hirdt (Elias Sports Bureau), Rick Hummel (St. Louis Post-Dispatch), Moss Klein (Newark Star-Ledger), Bill Madden (New York Daily News), Ken Nigro (former Baltimore Sun writer), Jack O'Connell (The Hartford Courant), Tracy Ringolsby (Rocky Mountain News), and Mark Whicker (Orange Country Register). Their list of 200 players was announced April 19, 2004.

Players. († marks those newly eligible since 2003 (eight). They last played in the majors during 1982 or 1983.)

Babe Adams - Joe Adcock - Dick Allen - Felipe Alou - Sal Bando - Dick Bartell - Ginger Beaumont - †Mark Belanger - Wally Berger - Bobby Bonds - Ken Boyer - Harry Brecheen - Tommy Bridges - Pete Browning - Charlie Buffinton - Lew Burdette - George H. Burns - George J. Burns - Dolph Camilli - †Bert Campaneris - Bob Caruthers - George Case - Norm Cash - Phil Cavarretta - Spud Chandler - Ben Chapman - Rocky Colavito - Mort Cooper - Walker Cooper - Wilbur Cooper - Doc Cramer - Del Crandall - Gavvy Cravath - Lave Cross - Mike Cuellar - Bill Dahlen - Alvin Dark - Jake Daubert - Tommy Davis - Willie Davis - Paul Derringer - Dom DiMaggio - Patsy Donovan - Larry Doyle - Jimmy Dykes - Bob Elliott - Del Ennis - Carl Erskine - Elroy Face - Wes Ferrell - Freddie Fitzsimmons - Curt Flood - Bill Freehan - Jim Fregosi - Carl Furillo - Mike Garcia - Junior Gilliam - Jack Glasscock - Joe Gordon - Charlie Grimm - Dick Groat - Heinie Groh - Stan Hack - Harvey Haddix - Mel Harder - Jeff Heath - Tommy Henrich - Babe Herman - Pinky Higgins - John Hiller - Gil Hodges - Ken Holtzman - Willie Horton - Elston Howard - Frank Howard - Dummy Hoy - Larry Jackson - Jackie Jensen - Sam Jethroe - Bob L. Johnson - Davey Johnson - Joe Judge - †Jim Kaat - Willie Kamm - Ken Keltner - Don Kessinger - Johnny Kling - Ted Kluszewski - Ray Kremer - Harvey Kuenn - Joe Kuhel - Vern Law - Sam Leever - Mickey Lolich - Sherm Lollar - Herman Long - Eddie Lopat - Dolf Luque - †Sparky Lyle - Sal Maglie - Jim Maloney - Firpo Marberry - Marty Marion - Roger Maris - Mike G. Marshall - Pepper Martin - †Lee May - Carl Mays - Tim McCarver - Frank McCormick - Lindy McDaniel - Gil McDougald - Sam McDowell - Stuffy McInnis - Denny McLain - Roy McMillan - Dave McNally - Andy Messersmith - Bob Meusel - Irish Meusel - Bing Miller - Stu Miller - Minnie Miñoso - Terry Moore - Tony Mullane - Thurman Munson - †Bobby Murcer - Johnny Murphy - Buddy Myer - Art Nehf - Don Newcombe - Bobo Newsom - Lefty O'Doul - Tony Oliva - Claude Osteen - Andy Pafko - Milt Pappas - Camilo Pascual - Ron Perranoski - Jim Perry - Johnny Pesky - Rico Petrocelli - Deacon Phillippe - Billy Pierce - Vada Pinson - Wally Pipp - Johnny Podres - Boog Powell - Jack Quinn - Vic Raschi - Ed Reulbach - Allie Reynolds - Eddie Rommel - Charlie Root - Al Rosen - Schoolboy Rowe - Pete Runnels - Jimmy Ryan - Johnny Sain - Ron Santo - Hank Sauer - Wally Schang - George Scott - Rip Sewell - Bob Shawkey - Urban Shocker - Roy Sievers - Curt Simmons - †Reggie Smith - Vern Stephens - Riggs Stephenson - Mel Stottlemyre - Harry Stovey - Jesse Tannehill - Tony Taylor - Johnny Temple - Fred Tenney - Bobby Thomson - †Luis Tiant - Mike Tiernan - Joe Torre - Cecil Travis - Hal Trosky - Virgil Trucks - Johnny Vander Meer - George Van Haltren - Bobby Veach - Mickey Vernon - Dixie Walker - Bucky Walters - Lon Warneke - Will White - Cy Williams - Ken R. Williams - Maury Wills - Smoky Joe Wood - Wilbur Wood - Glenn Wright - Jimmy Wynn - Rudy York

The 200 players were almost evenly divided between players retired less than 50 years (99 players retired from 1955 to 1983) and those retired over 50 years (101 players retired 1954 or earlier).

By primary fielding position the nominees were starting pitchers (66), relief pitchers (9), catchers (10), first basemen (24), second basemen (8), third basemen (13), shortstops (19), left fielders (18), center fielders (17) and right fielders (16).

=== Phase two ===
The Historical Overview nominations were forwarded to a 60-member BBWAA screening committee comprising two writers from each major league city. In summer 2004 they elected 25 players who would appear on the final ballot. (Everyone voted for 25 nominees.) Meanwhile, a committee of six Hall of Fame members independently selected five of the 200 nominees who would appear on the final ballot, which would thereby comprise 25 to 30 players.

Evidently the writers named all of the Hall of Fame members' five selections, for there were 25 on the final ballot.

=== Final ballot ===
On December 6, 2004, the final ballot of 25 candidates was announced. Those selected played primarily from the 1950s onward, with only 5 of the 25 candidates having retired before 1960, and only three pitchers – Smoky Joe Wood, Carl Mays and Wes Ferrell – having retired before 1950. The BBWAA screening committee had failed to include any candidates from the era before 1910. This likely reflected a tendency among the voting writers to vote only for those players they had seen themselves, and to withhold votes from earlier players.

All 60 living members of the Hall were eligible to cast ballots in the final election, along with the 8 living recipients of the J. G. Taylor Spink Award, the 14 living recipients of the Ford C. Frick Award, and the sole additional member of the pre-2001 Veterans Committee whose term had not yet expired (John McHale). Balloting was conducted by mail in January 2005, with voters permitted to vote for up to 10 candidates from the ballot of 25 individuals; all candidates who received at least 75% of the vote would be elected. Results of the voting by the Veterans Committee were announced on March 2.

There were 83 eligible voters, 80 of whom cast ballots; 60 votes were required for election. In all, 458 individual votes were cast, for an average of 5.73 votes per ballot. For the second consecutive Veterans Committee election, no player was elected. Of the 21 candidates who were also on the 2003 ballot, only 7 gained more votes in 2005, with only Joe Torre (7), Ron Santo (6) and Ken Boyer (4) increasing their totals by more than two votes. Candidates who were considered by the Committee for the first time are indicated here with a †; candidates who have since been elected in subsequent elections are indicated in italics. The complete ballot, with the number of votes cast for each candidate, was:

Player	Votes	Percent
Gil Hodges	52	65.0%
Ron Santo	52	65.0%
Tony Oliva	45	56.3%
Jim Kaat†	43	53.8%
Joe Torre	36	45.0%
Maury Wills	26	32.5%
Vada Pinson	23	28.8%
Luis Tiant†	20	25.0%
Roger Maris	19	23.8%
Marty Marion	16	20.0%
Ken Boyer	15	18.8%
Joe Gordon	14	17.5%
Dick Allen	12	15.0%
Carl Mays	12	15.0%
Minnie Miñoso	12	15.0%
Curt Flood	10	12.5%
Wes Ferrell	9	11.3%
Mickey Lolich	9	11.3%
Don Newcombe	8	10.0%
Sparky Lyle†	7	8.8%
Elston Howard	6	7.5%
Bobby Bonds	4	5.0%
Rocky Colavito	4	5.0%
Thurman Munson	2	2.5%
Smoky Joe Wood	2	2.5%

== J. G. Taylor Spink Award ==
Peter Gammons received the J. G. Taylor Spink Award honoring a baseball writer. (The award was voted at the December 2004 meeting of the BBWAA, dated 2004, and conferred in the summer 2005 ceremonies.)

The Spink Award has been presented by the BBWAA at the annual summer induction ceremonies since 1962. It recognizes a sportswriter "for meritorious contributions to baseball writing". The recipients are not members of the Hall of the Fame, merely featured in a permanent exhibit at the National Baseball Museum, but writers and broadcasters commonly call them "Hall of Fame writers" or words to that effect. Living recipients were members of the Veterans Committee for elections in odd years 2003 to 2007.

Three final candidates, selected by a BBWAA committee, were named on July 13, 2004 in Houston in conjunction with All-Star Game activities; the finalists were: Peter Gammons of The Boston Globe, Sports Illustrated and ESPN The Magazine; the late Vern Plagenhoef, who covered the Detroit Tigers for Michigan's Booth Newspaper Group; and Tracy Ringolsby, who has covered the Colorado Rockies for the Rocky Mountain News since 1993 and has completed 30 seasons as a baseball writer. All 10-year members of the BBWAA were eligible to cast ballots in voting conducted by mail in November.

On December 12, Peter Gammons was announced as the recipient, having received 248 votes out of the 448 ballots cast, with Ringolsby receiving 134 votes and Plagenhoef receiving 66.

== Ford C. Frick Award ==
Jerry Coleman received the Ford C. Frick Award honoring a baseball broadcaster.

The Frick Award has been presented at the annual summer induction ceremonies since 1978. It recognizes a broadcaster for "major contributions to baseball". The recipients are not members of the Hall of the Fame, merely featured in a permanent exhibit at the National Baseball Museum, but writers and broadcasters commonly call them "Hall of Fame broadcaster" or words to that effect. Living honorees were members of the Veterans Committee for elections in odd years 2003 to 2007.

To be eligible, an active or retired broadcaster must have a minimum of 10 years of continuous major league broadcast service with a ball club, a network, or a combination of the two; more than 160 candidates were eligible.

On December 13, 2004, 10 finalists were announced. In accordance with guidelines established in 2003, seven were chosen by a research committee at the museum: Jerry Coleman, Ken Coleman, Dizzy Dean, Gene Elston, Tony Kubek, France Laux and Graham McNamee. Three additional candidates – Dave Niehaus, Tom Cheek and Ron Santo – were selected in voting by over 65,000 fans prior to November 2004 at the Hall's official website .

On February 22, Jerry Coleman was announced as the 2005 recipient ; a former major league infielder and the voice of the San Diego Padres almost continuously since 1972, he was selected in a January vote by a 20-member committee composed of the 14 living recipients, along with six additional broadcasting historians or columnists: Bob Costas (NBC), Barry Horn (The Dallas Morning News), Stan Isaacs (formerly of New York Newsday), Ted Patterson (historian), Curt Smith (historian) and Larry Stewart (Los Angeles Times). Committee members are asked to base the selection on the following criteria: longevity; continuity with a club; honors, including national assignments such as the World Series and All-Star Games; and popularity with fans.
