= Bill Madden (sportswriter) =

American sportswriter (born 1946)

- Born: August 9, 1945 (age 81)
- Occupation: Sportswriter
- Employer: New York Daily News
- Awards: J. G. Taylor Spink Award

Bill Madden (born August 9, 1945) is an American sportswriter with the New York Daily News. A member of the Baseball Writers' Association of America, he has served on the Historical Overview Committee of the Baseball Hall of Fame in 2005, 2007 and 2008, helping to select candidates for the final ballots presented to the Veterans Committee.

== Early life ==
Madden grew up in Oradell, New Jersey. His father, Charles, owned a plumbing supply company in Hackensack, N.J. and as he often said: "weaned me on baseball and newspapers". At Bergen Catholic High School in Oradell, N.J., Madden was a two-time state champion in the 100 and 220-yard dashes (1963-64), earning him a track scholarship to the University of South Carolina where he later graduated with a degree in journalism.

== Career ==
After leaving University of South Carolina, Madden became a sportswriter with United Press International for nine years before he joined the Daily News in 1978. He covered the New York Yankees before becoming a columnist in 1989. In 1984 he created the "Rated Rookies" subset for Donruss baseball card sets and has been a Donruss staple in its baseball cards ever since.

On September 16, 2015, Madden was laid off from the Daily News by publisher Mort Zuckerman in a cost-cutting effort that included other longtime, well-known columnists. However, two years later, Madden was brought back on a freelance basis and continues to write several columns a week.

== Awards and honors ==
In 2010, Madden was the recipient of the baseball scribe's highest honor, the J.G. Taylor Spink Award.

== Books ==
He has written the books Damned Yankees: A No-Holds-Barred Account of Life With "Boss" Steinbrenner (1991, with Moss Klein), Zim - A Baseball Life (2001, with Don Zimmer), Pride of October: What it Was to Be Young and a Yankee (2003), and Bill Madden: My 25 Years Covering Baseball's Heroes, Scoundrels, Triumphs and Tragedies 2004 Steinbrenner: The Last Lion of Baseball (2010), "1954 - The Year Willie Mays and the First Generation of Black Superstars Changed Baseball Forever" (2014), and "Lou - -Fifty Years of Kicking Dirt, Playing Hard and Winning in the Sweet Spot of Baseball" (with Lou Piniella) (2017).

In 2016 and 2017, Madden interviewed Tom Seaver in Seaver's winery for a documentary to be aired in 2019, when Seaver was already battling the effects of lyme disease which mimicked the memory loss symptoms of dementia or Alzheimer's disease. When Seaver died in 2020, Madden wrote Tom Seaver: A Terrific Life in honor of him.

In 2025, Madden released a free wheeling memoir; Yankees, Typewriters, Scandals and Cooperstown, covering his career in baseball.

== Bibliography ==
- Damned Yankees (with Moss Klein) 1990 Warner Books ISBN 9780446360890, 0446360899
- Zim - A Baseball Life 2001 Total Sports ISBN 9781930844193
- Pride of October - What it Was to be Young and a Yankee 2003 Warner ISBN 9780446554602
- The Zen of Zim 2004 St. Martin's Press ISBN 9781466872332
- Steinbrenner - The Last Lion of Baseball 2010 Harper-Collins ISBN 9780061690327
- 1954 - The Year Willie Mays and the First Generation of Black Superstars Changed Baseball Forever 2014 DeCapo Press ISBN 9780306823336
- Lou - (Lou Piniella) 2017 Harper-Collins ISBN 9780062670960
- Tom Seaver - A Terrific Life 2020 Simon & Shuster ISBN 9781982136222
- Yankees, Typewriters, Scandals and Cooperstown - A Baseball Memoir 2025 Triumph Books ISBN 9781637277171
