= Jim Rice =

American baseball player (born 1953)

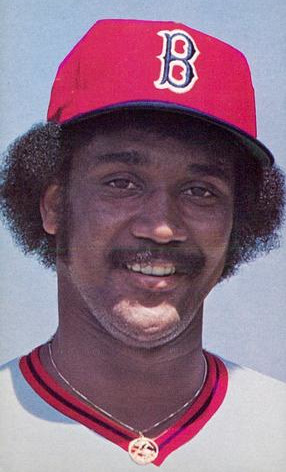
- Rice with the Boston Red Sox in 1976
- Left fielder / Designated hitter
- Born: March 8, 1953 (age 73); Anderson, South Carolina, U.S.
- Batted: Right Threw: Right

MLB debut
- August 19, 1974, for the Boston Red Sox

Last MLB appearance
- August 3, 1989, for the Boston Red Sox

MLB statistics
- Batting average: .298
- Hits: 2,452
- Home runs: 382
- Runs batted in: 1,451
- Stats at Baseball Reference

Teams
- As player: Boston Red Sox (1974–1989); As coach: Boston Red Sox (1995–2000)

Career highlights and awards
- 8× All-Star (1977–1980, 1983–1986); AL MVP (1978); 2× Silver Slugger Award (1983, 1984); 3× AL home run leader (1977, 1978, 1983); 2× AL RBI leader (1978, 1983); Boston Red Sox No. 14 retired; Boston Red Sox Hall of Fame

Member of the National

Baseball Hall of Fame
- Induction: 2009
- Vote: 76.4% (15th ballot)

James Edward Rice (born March 8, 1953) is an American former professional baseball left fielder and designated hitter who played in Major League Baseball (MLB). Rice played his entire 16-year MLB career for the Boston Red Sox. In 2009, Rice was inducted into the Baseball Hall of Fame.

Rice was an eight-time American League (AL) All-Star and was named the AL's Most Valuable Player in 1978 after becoming the first major league player in 19 years to hit for 400 total bases. He went on to become the ninth player to lead the major leagues in total bases in consecutive seasons. He joined Ty Cobb as one of two players to lead the AL in total bases three consecutive seasons. He batted above .300 seven times during his 16 season career, and collected 100+ runs batted in (RBI) eight times. Rice also had 200 hits in four seasons, and 20+ home runs 11 times. He also led the league in home runs three times, RBIs and slugging percentage twice each, and averaged more than 117 hits for every 100 regular season MLB games he had played in during his career. Between 1975 and 1986, Rice led all major league players in hits, RBIs and total bases, as well as all AL players in home runs and runs scored.

From 1975 through 1980 he was part of one of the sport's great outfields along with Fred Lynn and Dwight Evans (who was his teammate for his entire career); Rice continued the tradition of his predecessors Ted Williams and Carl Yastrzemski as a power-hitting left fielder who played his entire career for the Red Sox. He ended his career with a .502 slugging percentage, and then ranked tenth in AL history with 382 home runs; his career marks in homers, hits (2,452), RBI (1,451) and total bases (4,129) remain Red Sox records for a right-handed hitter, with Evans eventually surpassing his Boston records for career runs scored, at bats and extra base hits by a right-handed hitter. When Rice retired, his 1,503 career games in left field ranked seventh in AL history.

== Notable seasons ==
In the minor leagues, Rice's three-run home run was the key blow in helping the Pawtucket Red Sox (International League) defeat the Tulsa Oilers (American Association) in a 5–2 win in the 1973 Junior World Series. After he was AAA's International League Rookie of the Year, Most Valuable Player and Triple Crown winner in 1974, he and fellow rookie teammate Fred Lynn were brought up to the Red Sox at the same time, and were known as the "Gold Dust Twins".

Rice was promoted in the Red Sox organization to be a full-time player in 1975, and finished in second place for the American League's Rookie of the Year honors, and third in the Most Valuable Player voting, after he finished the season with 174 base hits, 102 runs batted in, a .309 batting average and 22 home runs; Lynn won both awards (145 games with the Red Sox, he batted .331 with 21 home runs and 105 RBIs). The Red Sox won the AL's East Division, but Rice did not play in either the League Championship Series or World Series because of a fourth metacarpal bone fracture in his left hand sustained when he was hit by a pitch thrown by Vern Ruhle in the second inning of a 6–5 away win over the Detroit Tigers on 21 September. The Red Sox went on to lose the World Series four games to three to the Cincinnati Reds of the National League (NL).

When the 1977 season ended, Rice found himself leading the AL in three different offensive categories. His 39 home runs was tops in the league; the first time he led the league in this statistic. He also led the league with a .593 slugging average and 392 total bases, the most by an AL player in 39 years.

In 1978, after having the best season in his career, Rice won the American League's Most Valuable Player award in a campaign where he hit .315 (third in the league) and led the league in home runs (46), RBI (139), hits (213), triples (15), total bases (406, and slugging percentage (.600). Altogether he led the AL in 11 different categories that season, one shy of tying the Major league record of 12 set in 1921 by Rogers Hornsby. Rice is one of two AL players ever to lead his league in triples and home runs in the same season. He also remains the only player to lead the major leagues in triples, home runs and RBIs in the same season. His 406 total bases that year is still a Red Sox record, and was the most in the AL since Joe DiMaggio had 418 in 1937. He was the first major leaguer with 400 or more total bases since Hank Aaron in 1959. This feat was not repeated until 1997, when Larry Walker had 409 in the NL. No AL player has done it since Rice in 1978, and his total remains the third highest by an AL right-handed hitter, behind DiMaggio and Jimmie Foxx (438 in 1932).

Rice had another superb season in 1979. Beside having his third season with over 200 hits, he had finished in the top three in eight different AL batting categories. He finished third in runs scored and second in home runs, RBIs, hits, slugging average, runs created, and extra base hits. He also led the league in total bases for the third straight time, and had the fourth-highest AL Batting Average. He is the only player in MLB history with three consecutive years of having at least 200 hits and 39 home runs while batting at least .315 in each of those years.

At the end of the 1983 season Rice led the AL in four categories including home runs, RBIs, total bases, and grounding into double plays. He had tied Milwaukee Brewers player George Scott's (1975) record and became the second player to lead the AL in those categories in the same season. In 2012 Miguel Cabrera, a Detroit Tiger, became the third AL player to reach this mark; no NL player has ever led that league in these three categories in the same year.

In 1986, Rice had 200 hits, batted .324, and had 110 RBIs. The Red Sox made it to the World Series for the second time during his career. This time, Rice played in all 14 postseason games, where he collected 14 hits, including two home runs. He also scored 14 runs and drove in six. His 14 runs scored is the fifth most by an individual during a single year's postseason play. The Red Sox went on to lose the World Series to the New York Mets, four games to three, the fourth consecutive Series appearance by Boston which they lost in seven games.

== Career accomplishments ==
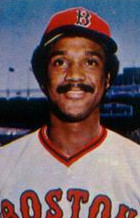
Rice in 1977

Rice led the AL in home runs three times (1977, 1978, 1983), in RBIs twice (1978, 1983), in slugging percentage twice (1977, 1978), and in total bases four times (1977–1979, 1983). In fact, his 1157 total bases over the three consecutive seasons leading the league ties him for seventh place with Rogers Hornsby and is five total bases shy of Babe Ruth's three year mark of 1162 total bases. Rice also picked up Silver Slugger Awards in 1983 and 1984 (the award was created in 1980). Rice hit at least 39 home runs in a season four times, had eight 100-RBI seasons and four seasons with over 200 hits, and batted over .300 seven times. He finished his MLB career with a .298 batting average, 373 doubles, 79 triples, 382 home runs, 1,451 RBIs, 1,249 runs scored, 2,452 hits, 670 walks, and 4,129 total bases. He was an American League All-Star eight times (1977–1980, 1983–1986). In addition to winning the American League MVP award in 1978, he finished in the top five in MVP voting five other times (1975, 1977, 1979, 1983, 1986).

Rice is the only player in history to lead the league in home runs, RBIs, and triples in the same year. He is also the only player in major league history to record over 200 hits while hitting 39 or more home runs for three consecutive years. He had tied the AL record of leading the league in total bases for three straight seasons. Beside being one of three AL players to have three straight seasons of hitting at least 39 home runs while batting .315 or higher. Also in 1978, Rice became the fourth and final MLB player to lead both leagues at the same time in hitting the most Home Runs and having the most Hits in the same season. During his most productive 12-season span from 1975 to 1986, Rice collectively led all American League players in total games played, at bats, runs scored, hits, homers, RBIs, slugging percentage, total bases, extra base hits, go-ahead RBIs, multi-hit games, and outfield assists. Among all other MLB players, including those in the National League, Rice was the leader in five of the above 12 categories (Mike Schmidt is next on the leader board; he led in four).

In 1984 Rice set a major league single-season record by hitting into 36 double plays. On the backside of a 1964 Topps baseball card of Earl Wilson No. 503, Goose Goslin, who got his start in 1921, was credited with grounding into 48 double plays in a season during his career. However, this mark was not followed closely until the mid to late 1930s. Rice's 315 career double plays grounded into ranks him tied in eighth place on the career leaders list with Eddie Murray. Rice did break Brooks Robinson's AL record for GIDP by a right-handed hitter (297) in 1988. Cal Ripken Jr. eventually surpassed this mark in 1999. Rice had led the league for four seasons (1982–1985), which tied the major league record that had been established by Ernie Lombardi. In 2009 Miguel Tejada recorded his fifth season leading his league in this category and now holds this record. During the time Rice was the annual GDP leader he also had averaged 112 RBI's per season which is ten RBI's better than second place Albert Pujols RBI average of 102 following his four-year GDP leadership. The on-base prowess of Rice's teammates placed him in a double play situation over 2,000 times during his career. Rice posted a batting average of .310 and slugging percentage of .515 in those situations which is better than his overall career marks in those categories.

Jim Rice's number 14 was retired by the Boston Red Sox in 2009.

During his career Rice played in 35 games where he hit two or more HRs, and drove in four or more runs in a game 48 times. He could hit for both power and average, and currently only 12 other retired players rank ahead of him in both career home runs and batting average: Hank Aaron, Jimmie Foxx, Lou Gehrig, Willie Mays, Stan Musial, Mel Ott, Babe Ruth, Ted Williams, Chipper Jones, Vladimir Guerrero, Mike Piazza, and Larry Walker. In 1981, Lawrence Ritter and Donald Honig included him in their book The 100 Greatest Baseball Players of All Time.

Rice was an accomplished left fielder, finishing his career with a fielding percentage of .980 and 137 outfield assists (comparable to Ted Williams' figures of .974 and 140). Although he did not possess great speed, he had a strong throwing arm and was able to master the various caroms that balls took from the Green Monster (in left field) in Fenway Park. His 21 assists in 1983 remains the most by a Red Sox outfielder since 1944, when Bob Johnson had 23. Aside from playing 1,543 games as an outfielder during his career, Rice also appeared as a designated hitter in 530 games.

Rice's number 14 was retired by the Red Sox in a pre-game ceremony on July 28, 2009.

== Community activities ==
Rice was associated with a variety of charitable organizations during his career, primarily on behalf of children, some of which carried on into his retirement. He was named an honorary chairman of The Jimmy Fund, the fundraising arm of the Dana–Farber Cancer Institute in Boston, in 1979, and in 1992 was awarded that organization's "Jimmy Award," which honors individuals who demonstrate their dedication to cancer research. Rice is also active in his support of the Neurofibromatosis Foundation of New England. Rice's involvement with Major League Baseball's RBI program (Reviving Baseball in Inner Cities) resulted in the naming of a new youth baseball facility in Roxbury, Massachusetts, in his honor in 1999. A youth recreation center in Rice's hometown of Anderson, South Carolina, is also named in his honor.

Rice is fondly remembered for his heroic actions and quick thinking during a nationally televised game at Fenway Park on August 7, 1982. During the fourth inning, Red Sox utility infielder Dave Stapleton hit a blistering line drive into the right-field box seats, at a time when MLB ballparks only had protective netting behind home plate, but not along the baselines. The line drive hit a 4 year-old fan, Jonathan Keane, seated only two rows up from the dugout, fracturing his skull and causing profuse bleeding. Rice, realizing it would take too long for medical staff to reach the young fan, popped out of the dugout, grabbed Keane, and carried him into the clubhouse, where the Red Sox medical staff was able to attend to him quickly. Due to Rice's decisive action, the boy was able to be rushed to the hospital for emergency surgery, and ultimately, according to the physicians who treated the boy at the hospital, Rice saved the boy's life. Rice played the rest of the game in his blood-stained uniform, and later paid the Keane family's hospital bills.

Keane, who was reported to have no memories of that day, made a full recovery from his injuries with minimal scarring. He was invited back the following season to throw out the first pitch, and in recent interviews has credited Rice with saving his life.

== Retirement activities ==
In 1990, Rice agreed to play for the St. Petersburg Pelicans of the short-lived Senior Professional Baseball Association. After, Rice served as a roving batting coach (1992–1994) and hitting instructor (1995–2000), and remains an instructional batting coach (2001–present) with the Red Sox organization. While the Red Sox hitting coach, the team led the league in hitting in 1997 and players won two batting titles. Rice was the hitting coach for the American League in the 1997 and 1999 Major League Baseball All-Star Games, both under the same manager, the New York Yankees' Joe Torre. Since 2003, he's also been employed as a commentator for the New England Sports Network (NESN), where he contributes to the Red Sox pre-game and post-game shows. He had a cameo appearance in the NESN movie Wait 'til This Year and in the film Fever Pitch. The former slugger has been known to pass his wisdom on to the current Sox players and stars from time to time. Rice was elected to the Boston Red Sox Hall of Fame when it was established in 1995 and is the 40th member of Ted Williams' Museum and Hitters Hall of Fame, inducted with Paul Molitor, Dave Winfield and Robin Yount in 2001. On November 29, 2008, the Boston chapter of the Baseball Writers' Association of America (BBWAA) announced that Rice would receive the Emil Fuchs Award for long and meritorious service to baseball.

During his Hall of Fame acceptance speech Rice revealed that he is a devoted fan of The Young and the Restless, noting that he was watching the show when he was informed of his election into Cooperstown.

== Incidents ==
Before a spring training game on March 13, 1981, Rice was involved in a physical altercation with Bill Crowley, a Red Sox public relations official. Reportedly the two men became embroiled in an argument over a parking spot, during which Crowley threatened to slash Rice's tires. Rice grabbed Crowley's arm and twisted it, causing bleeding and a bruised arm that required treatment by a team physician.

During a game at Yankee Stadium on September 13, 1986, Rice was involved in a hard collision with teammate Spike Owen as the two chased down a fly ball in foul territory. The collision resulted in both men being knocked to the ground. While a dazed Rice took his time coming to his feet, a fan reached down on the field and snatched Rice's hat. When the fan refused to return the hat, Rice rushed into the stands to confront him, followed by several other Red Sox players. Rice later alleged that the fan had taunted him using racial slurs.

On another occasion, during the summer of 1987, Rice became infuriated at a line of questioning from Hartford Courant sportswriter Steve Fainaru, tearing off Fainaru's shirt by its collar. Afterwards, Fainaru returned to the press box, shirtless, to finish writing his game recap before its deadline. The following day Rice personally apologized to Fainaru and presented him with a new shirt, which Fainaru declined.

On July 20, 1988, Rice was involved in a physical altercation with Red Sox manager Joe Morgan during a game against the Minnesota Twins at Fenway Park. The incident resulted when Morgan lifted Rice from the batting order during the eighth inning, in favor of light-hitting Spike Owen. Upon returning to the dugout from the on-deck circle, an incensed Rice confronted and shoved Morgan. The team subsequently issued Rice a three-game suspension.

== Hall of Fame ==
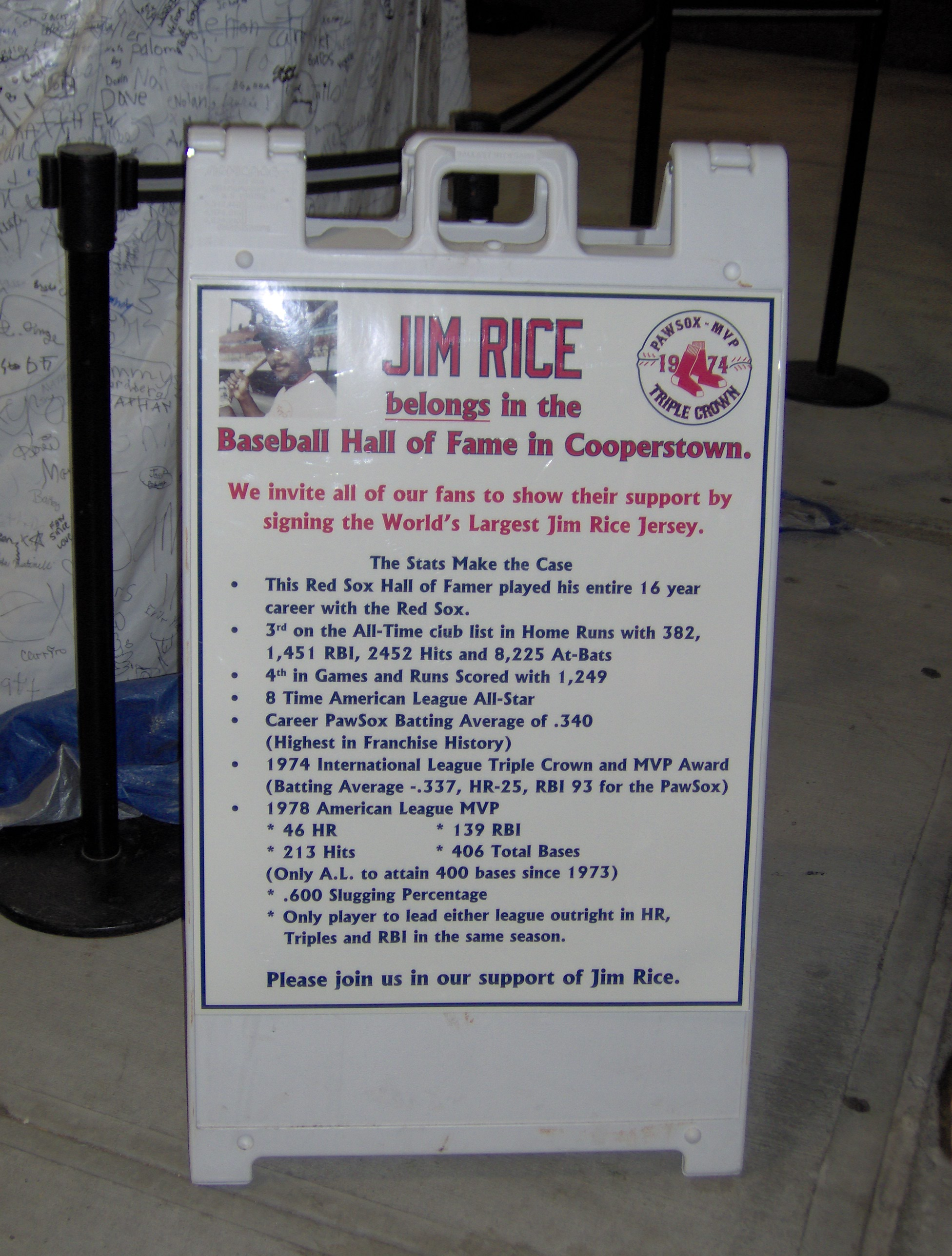
The sign at McCoy Stadium inviting fans to sign the jersey

While Rice was generally regarded as one of the better hitters of his era based upon statistics traditionally used by the BBWAA to evaluate players' Hall of Fame qualifications, he was not elected until his 15th and final year of eligibility, netting 76.4% of the votes, in 2009. Over the years he was on the BBWAA ballot, he received 3,974 total votes, the most collected by any player voted on for baseball's highest honor. In 2006 and 2007, he received over 63% of votes cast. Rice just missed being elected in 2008 when the count found him on 72.2% of the ballots, only 2.8% short of the required 75%. Rice became the fourth enshrinee inducted into the Hall of Fame on his last chance on the BBWAA ballot and the first since Ralph Kiner in 1975.

Rice's delay in election to the Hall of Fame stemmed in part from more current statistical analysis of player performance which suggested that his HOF credentials might have been more questionable than they were considered during his career. The delay may also have been related to his often difficult relationship with the media during his playing career, many of whom are still voting members of the BBWAA, and his career fading relatively early – he last played in the major leagues at age 36. Some writers, such as the Boston Herald's Sean McAdam, said that Rice's chances improved with the exposure of the "Steroids Era" in baseball. In the same article, McAdam expanded this subject by adding: "In an era when power numbers are properly viewed with a healthy dose of suspicion, Rice's production over the course of his 16 years gains additional stature." As such, he received increasingly more votes each year since the 2003 ballot, improving his vote totals by 133 over the last five years on the ballot. However, from several sabermetric standpoints it can be argued that Rice falls short of his peers in the Hall of Fame. Nevertheless, several commentators note that the continued criticism of Rice's statistics not meeting sabermetric standards was unfair since several other Hall of Fame players, notably Andre Dawson and Tony Pérez, fare even worse against such standards.

During the 2007 season, the Pawtucket Red Sox started a campaign to get Rice inducted which included having fans sign "the World's Largest Jim Rice Jersey.”

== See also ==
- Boston Red Sox Hall of Fame
- List of Major League Baseball career home run leaders
- List of Major League Baseball career hits leaders
- List of Major League Baseball career runs scored leaders
- List of Major League Baseball career runs batted in leaders
- List of Major League Baseball career total bases leaders
- List of Major League Baseball annual runs batted in leaders
- List of Major League Baseball annual home run leaders
- List of Major League Baseball annual triples leaders
- List of Major League Baseball players who spent their entire career with one franchise
- Major League Baseball titles leaders

Sporting positions
Preceded by Rick Burleson	Boston Red Sox Hitting Coach; 1995–2000	Succeeded by Rick Down
