= Bill Dahlen =

American baseball player (1870–1950)

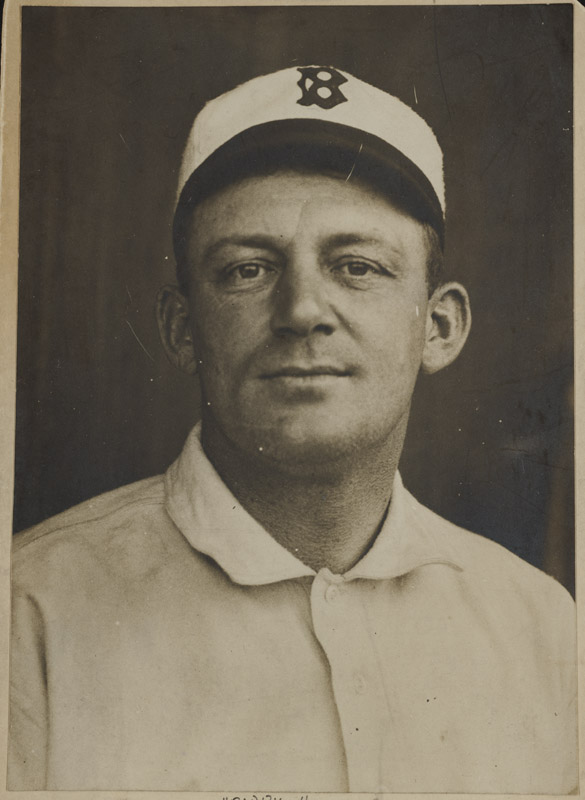
- Dahlen, c. 1908
- Shortstop / Manager
- Born: January 5, 1870; Nelliston, New York, U.S.
- Died: December 5, 1950 (aged 80); Brooklyn, New York, U.S.
- Batted: Right Threw: Right

MLB debut
- April 22, 1891, for the Chicago Colts

Last MLB appearance
- October 12, 1911, for the Brooklyn Dodgers

MLB statistics
- Batting average: .272
- Hits: 2,461
- Home runs: 84
- Runs batted in: 1,234
- Stolen bases: 548
- Managerial record: 251–355–9
- Winning %: .414
- Stats at Baseball Reference

Teams
- As player: Chicago Colts / Orphans (1891–1898); Brooklyn Superbas (1899–1903); New York Giants (1904–1907); Boston Doves (1908–1909); Brooklyn Superbas / Dodgers (1910–1911); As manager: Brooklyn Superbas / Dodgers (1910–1913)

Career highlights and awards
- World Series champion (1905); NL RBI leader (1904)

William Frederick Dahlen (January 5, 1870 – December 5, 1950), nicknamed "Bad Bill", was an American shortstop and manager in Major League Baseball who played for four National League teams from 1891 to 1911. After twice batting over .350 for the Chicago Colts, he starred on championship teams with the Brooklyn Superbas and the New York Giants, winning four National League pennants and one World Series title.

At the end of his career, he held the major league record for career games played (2,443); he ranked second in walks (1,064, behind Billy Hamilton's 1,187) and fifth in at bats (9,033), and was among the top ten in runs batted in (1,234), doubles (414) and extra base hits (661). He was also among the NL's top seven players in hits (2,461; some sources list totals up to 2,471), runs (1,589), triples (163) and total bases (3,447). After leading the league in assists four times and double plays three times, he set major league records for career games (2,132), putouts (4,850), assists (7,500), total chances (13,325) and double plays (881) as a shortstop; he still holds the record for total chances, and is second in putouts and fourth in assists. His 42-game hitting streak in 1894 was a record until 1897, and remains the fourth longest in history and the longest by a right-handed NL hitter. In defensive wins above replacement (WAR), his 28.5 is eleventh best all-time, and he finished in the top five in the category in ten different seasons.

== Early life ==
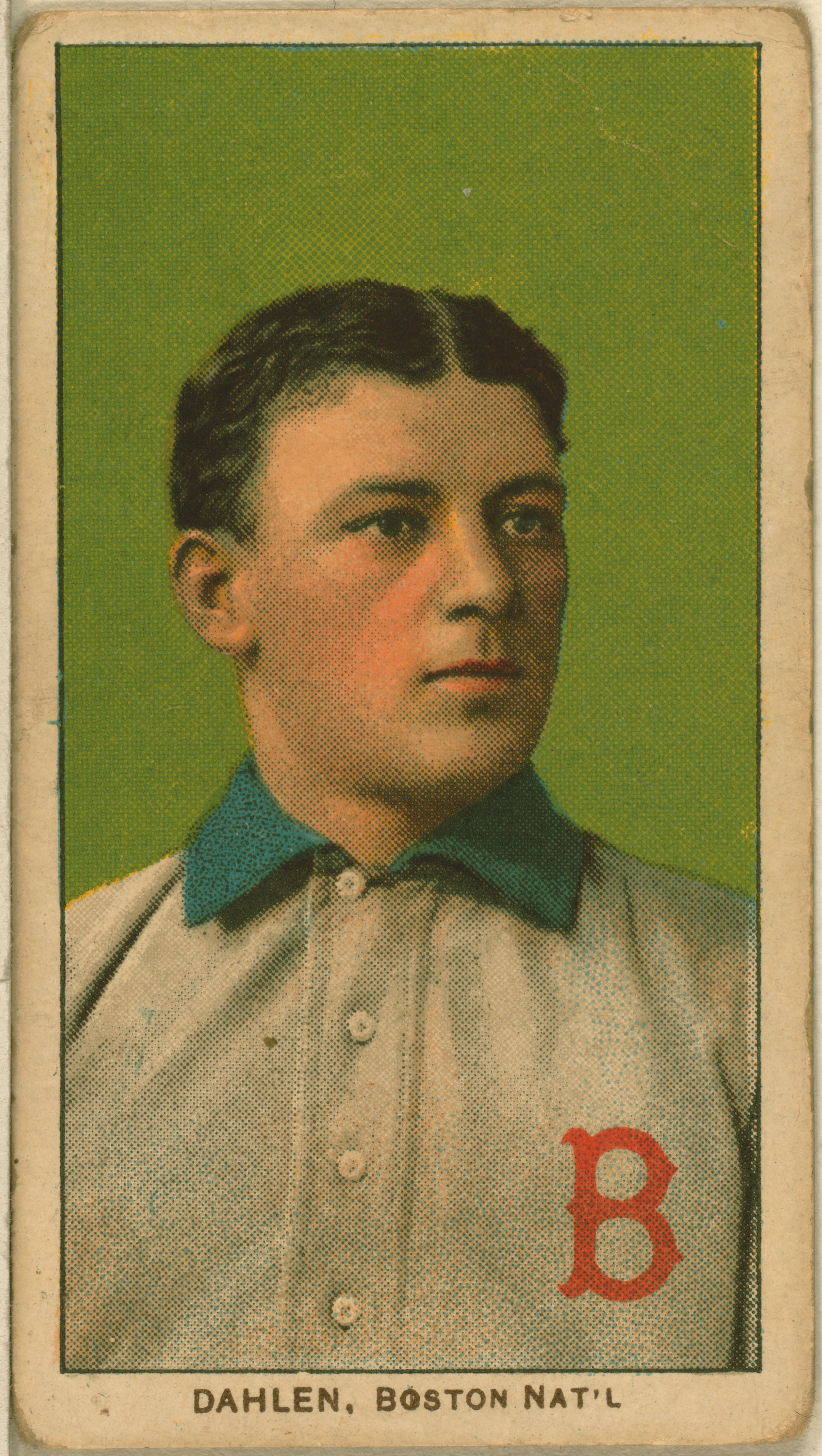
Baseball card of Bill Dahlen, T206 set.

Dahlen was born in Nelliston, New York at the corner of Berthoud and Dahlen and East Main to a family of German descent. He attended Fort Plain High School and the Clinton Liberal Institute, where he began an amateur baseball career as a pitcher and second baseman. He played semi-professionally in 1889, and professionally in the New York State League in 1890.

Dahlen married his wife, Hattie, on January, 1, 1890, and the couple had a daughter, Corinne, the next year.

== Professional career ==
=== Playing career ===
Dahlen was a very good hitter and had a good amount of power for the dead-ball era. He began his career with the Colts in 1891, and during his eight years with the team finished among the NL's top ten players in home runs four times and in slugging average three times. He also scored over 100 runs with 10 or more triples in each of his first six seasons; in 1894 he posted the highest batting average to that time by a major league shortstop (various sources state .357 or .362), and he followed with a .352 average in 1896. His 1894 season included a record 42-game hitting streak from June 20 to August 6, surpassing the 33-game streak by George Davis one year earlier. Amazingly, after going 0-for-6 in the next game, a 10-inning contest on August 7, Dahlen pulled off another 28-game streak, ending up having hit in 70 of 71 games. His mark was broken three years later by Willie Keeler, who hit in 44 straight; that NL record was eventually tied by Pete Rose. Only Joe DiMaggio, with his 56-game streak in 1941, has bettered Dahlen's mark among right-handed batters. Dahlen also twice hit three triples in a game, and once he tripled twice in one inning (August 30, 1900).

Prior to the 1899 season, Dahlen was traded by Chicago, and ended up in Brooklyn after another deal. His new team won the NL title in each of his first two seasons, and although his batting average had dropped from that of earlier years, he compensated by continuing to accumulate numerous walks and stolen bases and by playing outstanding defense. In 1902, he finished fourth in the NL with 74 RBI. In 1903 he set an NL record for fielding percentage with a .948 average, breaking George Wright's 1878 mark of .947; Tommy Corcoran broke his record in 1905 with a .952 average.

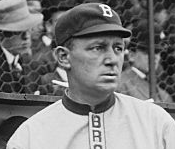
Bill Dahlen with Brooklyn, circa 1910

After the 1903 season, Dahlen was traded to the Giants, the team he'd always strived to play for, in exchange for pitcher Jack Cronin and Charlie Babb. While Cronin and Babb contributed only three bad years to Brooklyn, Dahlen posted great numbers with the Giants, leading the league with 80 RBI in his first year, 1904. In 1905 he was again among the RBI leaders, despite hitting only .242, as the Giants won their first World Series title. Although he was hitless in the five-game Series, he contributed with flawless defense and by drawing three walks and stealing three bases. He was often considered one of the quietest players in the game, keeping to himself most of the time. After the 1907 season, he was traded to the Boston Doves, for whom he played his last two full seasons. In 1909 he broke Jake Beckley's record of 2,386 career games; his record was broken in turn by Honus Wagner in 1914. He was named Brooklyn's manager for the 1910 season, but never finished above 6th place in four seasons. His last playing appearances were three games as a pinch-hitter in 1910, and one game at shortstop in 1911.

In a 21-season career, Dahlen batted .272; his 84 home runs were then among the fifteen highest totals in history, and ranked behind only Herman Long (91) among shortstops. His 289 stolen bases after the statistic was redefined in 1898 were then among the ten highest totals, as were his 547 total steals since they were first recorded in 1887. His records for games and putouts at shortstop were broken by Rabbit Maranville, and his mark for assists was surpassed by Luis Aparicio, with his NL record standing until Ozzie Smith broke it in 1993; his record for double plays was broken by Roger Peckinpaugh. Dahlen's 14,566 total chances at all positions have been surpassed by only Maranville (16,091) and Wagner (15,536). His reputation as a hot-headed player led to Dahlen being ejected 34 times as a player, tied for the 4th-most in MLB history.

=== Managerial career ===
As early as 1908, Brooklyn owner Charles Ebbets sought to have Dahlen manage his club, though he was unable to achieve this until the 1910 season.

In four years as a manager, all for Brooklyn, he posted a 251–355 record for a .414 winning percentage; his reputation as a hot-headed player continued as a manager, drawing 36 ejections in only four seasons. Dahlen tied an MLB record by being ejected 11 times in the 1910 MLB season, followed up with another 10 ejections in 1911, only trailing John McGraw in 1905–1906 for most ejections in a two-year span.

== Later years and death ==
Dahlen worked a number of jobs after his baseball career ended, including serving as an attendant at Yankee Stadium and working as a night clerk in a Brooklyn post office.

Dahlen died in Brooklyn after a long illness at age 80, and was buried in the Cemetery of the Evergreens, Brooklyn, New York City, New York. As of 2006, his grave remained unmarked.

== Hall of Fame consideration ==
Dahlen initially received very little support for induction into the National Baseball Hall of Fame; he received just one vote from the Veterans Committee on the Hall's inaugural 1936 ballot and again received a single vote when he was included on the Baseball Writers' Association of America's 1938 ballot. Dahlen was not considered again by the Veterans Committee for several decades; however, in part due to the reputation of his advanced statistics, Dahlen's candidacy has received renewed interest in recent years. He was included on the committee's Pre-1943 ballot for 2009 but received three or fewer of the twelve member committee's votes. He was included again on the newly formed Pre-Integration Committee's ballot for 2013. Dahlen received ten out of sixteen votes, falling two votes short of election, the highest total of any person on the ballot who was not elected. Dahlen was included again on the Pre-Integration Committee's 2016 ballot but the committee selected no new Hall of Fame members as Dahlen tied for second place with eight of sixteen votes. Dahlen was considered again by the newly formed Early Baseball Era Committee for the 2022 ballot but received three or fewer of the committee's sixteen votes. According to Baseball-Reference, Dahlen has the most career Wins Above Replacement of any position player not already inducted with the exception of players who either aren't yet eligible or are held back by a scandal.

The Nineteenth Century Committee of the Society for American Baseball Research named Dahlen the Overlooked 19th Century Baseball Legend for 2012—a 19th-century player, manager, executive or other baseball personality not yet inducted into the National Baseball Hall of Fame in Cooperstown, New York.

Dahlen was featured in David Pietrusza's 1995 television documentary Local Heroes in the segment "Knocking on Cooperstown's Door."

== See also ==
- List of Major League Baseball career hits leaders
- List of Major League Baseball career doubles leaders
- List of Major League Baseball career triples leaders
- List of Major League Baseball career runs scored leaders
- List of Major League Baseball career runs batted in leaders
- List of Major League Baseball career stolen bases leaders
- List of Major League Baseball annual runs batted in leaders
- List of Major League Baseball player-managers
