= Nick Peters =

American sportswriter (1939–2015)

- Born: Nick Anthony Peters; April 1, 1939
- Died: March 23, 2015 (aged 75); Elk Grove, California, U.S.
- Occupation: Writer

Nick Anthony Peters (April 1, 1939 – March 23, 2015) was an American sports writer who primarily covered San Francisco Giants baseball games in a career that spanned 47 seasons (1961–2007).

He spent the majority of his career on the Giants beat at The Oakland Tribune and The Sacramento Bee and also worked for the Berkeley Gazette and San Francisco Chronicle. He was nicknamed "The Greek."

Peters attended all 50 of the Giants' home openers from 1958 to 2008 and authored five books on the team.

He was the 2009 winner of the J. G. Taylor Spink Award in balloting by the Baseball Writers' Association of America.

Peters died at his home in Elk Grove, California on March 23, 2015, aged 75.
