= Joe Gordon =

American baseball player, coach, and manager (1915–1978)

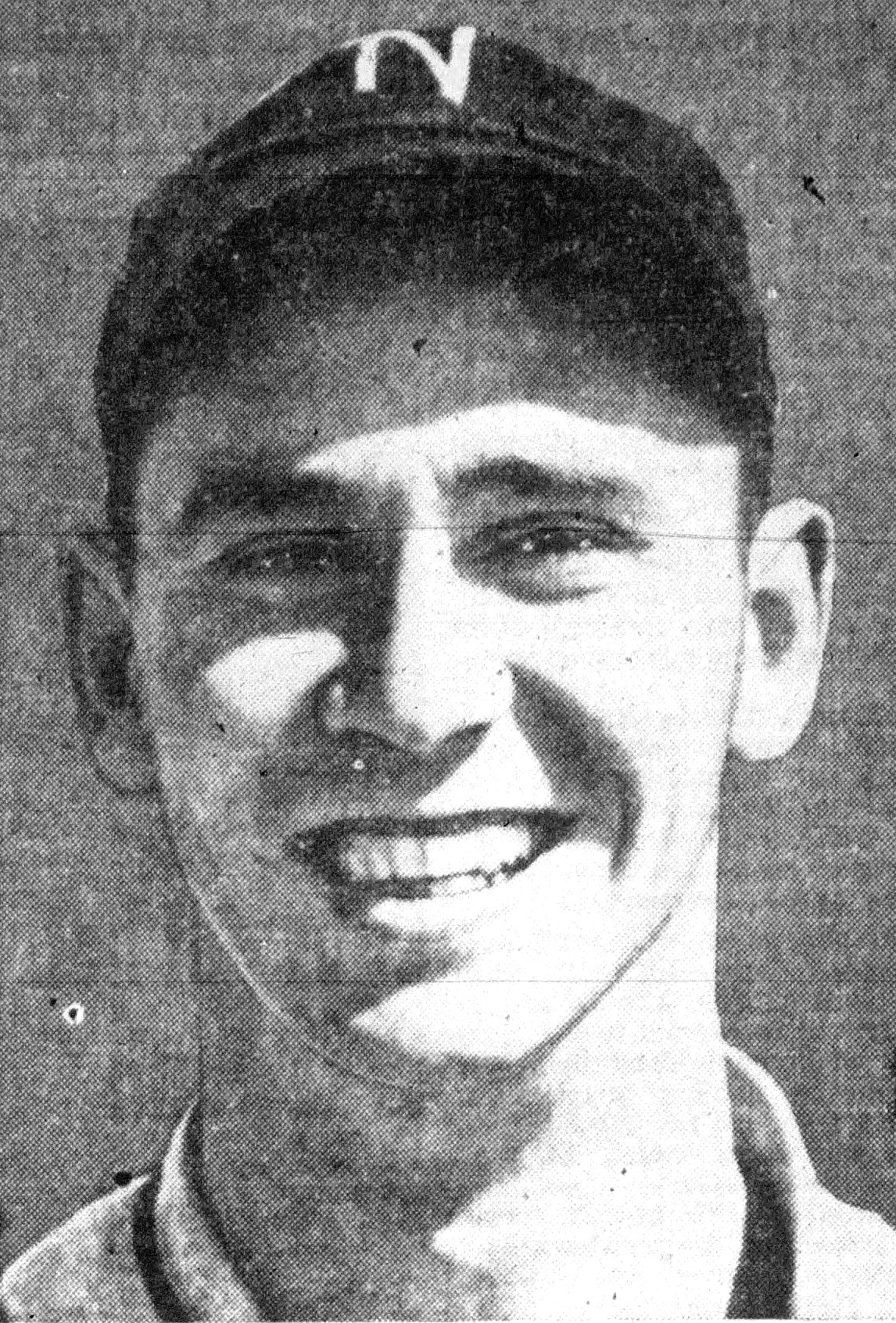
- Gordon with the Newark Bears in 1937
- Second baseman / Manager
- Born: February 18, 1915; Los Angeles, California, U.S.
- Died: April 14, 1978 (aged 63); Sacramento, California, U.S.
- Batted: Right Threw: Right

MLB debut
- April 18, 1938, for the New York Yankees

Last MLB appearance
- September 30, 1950, for the Cleveland Indians

MLB statistics
- Batting average: .268
- Home runs: 253
- Runs batted in: 975
- Managerial record: 305–308
- Winning %: .498
- Stats at Baseball Reference

Teams
- As player: New York Yankees (1938–1943, 1946); Cleveland Indians (1947–1950); As manager: Cleveland Indians (1958–1960); Detroit Tigers (1960); Kansas City Athletics (1961); Kansas City Royals (1969)

Career highlights and awards
- 9× All-Star (1939–1943, 1946–1949); 5× World Series champion (1938, 1939, 1941, 1943, 1948); AL MVP (1942); Cleveland Guardians Hall of Fame

Member of the National

Baseball Hall of Fame
- Induction: 2009
- Vote: 83.3%
- Election method: Veterans Committee

Joseph Lowell Gordon (February 18, 1915 – April 14, 1978), nicknamed "Flash", in reference to the comic-book character Flash Gordon, was an American second baseman, coach and manager in Major League Baseball who played for the New York Yankees and Cleveland Indians from 1938 to 1950. He was posthumously inducted into the Baseball Hall of Fame in 2009.

As a rookie second baseman in 1938, Gordon set a new record for home runs in a season for a second baseman with 25. Gordon was the outstanding player at his position during the 1940s, winning the 1942 American League MVP Award and being named to The Sporting News Major League All-Star Team in nine of his eleven seasons. Known for his acrobatic defense, he led the AL in assists four times and in double plays three times. He was the first AL second baseman to hit 20 home runs in a season, doing so seven times, with his peak being 32 in 1948. His single season record of home runs at the position was a record until 2001. His 253 home runs were second all-time among players primarily playing the position of second base when he retired, and only seven players have passed him since. He played a major role on the 1948 champion Indians, leading the team in homers and runs batted in. He ranked sixth in major league history in double plays (1,160) upon retiring and was sixth in AL history in games (1,519), putouts (3,600), assists (4,706) and total chances (8,566) and seventh in fielding percentage (.970).

== Early life ==
Gordon was born in Los Angeles, on February 18, 1915, to Benjamin Lowell Gordon (1875–1946) and Lulu Pearl Evans (1893–1984). The family moved to Oregon, where he attended Jefferson High School. After graduation, Gordon attended the University of Oregon, where he also competed as a halfback on the football team as well as in gymnastics, soccer and the long jump. Not limiting himself to sports, he also played the violin in the college orchestra. Playing on the Ducks baseball team during the 1934 and 1935 seasons, Gordon helped lead the team to a combined record of 30-14 – winning the Pacific Coast Conference's Northern Division both years. Gordon hit .358 while at Oregon which ranks him tied for fourth in team history. While in college, Gordon was a member of the Sigma Chi fraternity.

== Playing career ==
=== New York Yankees ===
After batting .418 in his sophomore year, he signed with the Yankees in 1936, with scout Bill Essick reporting: "(Gordon was) at his best when it meant the most and the going was toughest." After being assigned to the Yankees AA-level club, the Oakland Oaks, in the Pacific Coast League, Gordon proceeded to put up solid numbers in his first season in professional baseball, hitting .300 while spending the majority of time in the field at shortstop. In 1937, Gordon was moved to the Newark Bears, another AA team in the International League and continued to excel, hitting .280 with 26 home runs. His 1937 Bears' team is often regarded as the best minor league team in history with future all-stars George McQuinn, Charlie Keller, Tommy Henrich, Babe Dahlgren, and Spud Chandler joining Gordon to lead the team to an incredible 110 wins in 158 games.

Gordon's success led to the release of 33-year-old Tony Lazzeri following the 1937 season, and he made his debut with the Yankees in April 1938. His 25 home runs as a rookie set an American League record for second basemen, surpassing Detroit Tiger Charlie Gehringer's previous record of 19. Gordon would hold the AL record for home runs by a second baseman 64 years before being surpassed by Bret Boone's 36 home runs in 2001. Along with Jeff Heath of the Indians, who had batted .343, Gordon was one of the AL's top rookies, hitting .255 with 97 RBI and placing second to Gehringer in the AL with 450 assists as the Yankees won their third straight pennant. In the 1938 World Series sweep of the Chicago Cubs, he hit .400 and slugged .733. He had an RBI single, doubled, and recorded the final out in a 3-1 victory in Game 1. Gordon doubled in the first two runs in Game 2's 6-3 win. In Game 3, a 5-2 win, he had a solo home run to tie the game 1-1 in the fifth inning, and singled home two more runs in the sixth. He scored twice in an 8-3 win in the final Game 4 as New York took their third consecutive title.

1939 saw Gordon improve his batting average to .284 and top his own home run mark with 28. He led the AL in putouts, assists and double plays, and was second on the team to Joe DiMaggio and fifth in the league in both homers and RBI (111). On June 28 he hit three home runs; he made his first of nine All-Star teams, and finished ninth in the MVP vote. In the World Series against the Cincinnati Reds he hit only .143, but scored the first run in a 2-1 Game 1 victory. In Game 4, he drove in the tying run with one out in the ninth inning, and the Yankees scored three in the tenth to win 7-4 and complete another sweep for their fourth straight championship. In 1940 Gordon again increased his home run total to 30 and was second on the team to DiMaggio in homers and RBI (103), leading the AL in assists and posting career highs in runs (112), triples (10), slugging average (.511), total bases (315) and stolen bases (18) while hitting .281. On September 8, he hit for the cycle. But the Yankees finished two games behind Detroit, in the only year between 1936 and 1943 that they lost the pennant.

In 1941 he batted .276 with 24 home runs and 87 RBI, scoring 104 runs and teaming with rookie shortstop Phil Rizzuto to lead the AL in double plays; Gordon placed seventh in the MVP vote as New York returned to the top of the standings. In the 1941 World Series against the Brooklyn Dodgers he played phenomenally, hitting .500 with stellar defense. In Game 1 he started the scoring with a solo home run in the second inning, had an RBI single and was walked twice (once intentionally), and turned a double play with the tying run on first base to end a 3-2 win. In Game 2, he was walked three times, once intentionally, and had three double plays in a 3-2 loss. In Game 3 he tripled, walked and had four assists, one of them to end the 2-1 win. He doubled in two runs in the ninth inning of Game 4 to give the Yankees their final 7-4 lead, four batters after Dodger catcher Mickey Owen famously dropped a third strike which would have ended the game. And he drove in another run in the final 3-1 victory in Game 5. His five double plays (three of them in Game 2) remain a record for a five-game Series. After the Series, Yankees manager Joe McCarthy said, "The greatest all-around ballplayer I ever saw, and I don't bar any of them, is Joe Gordon."

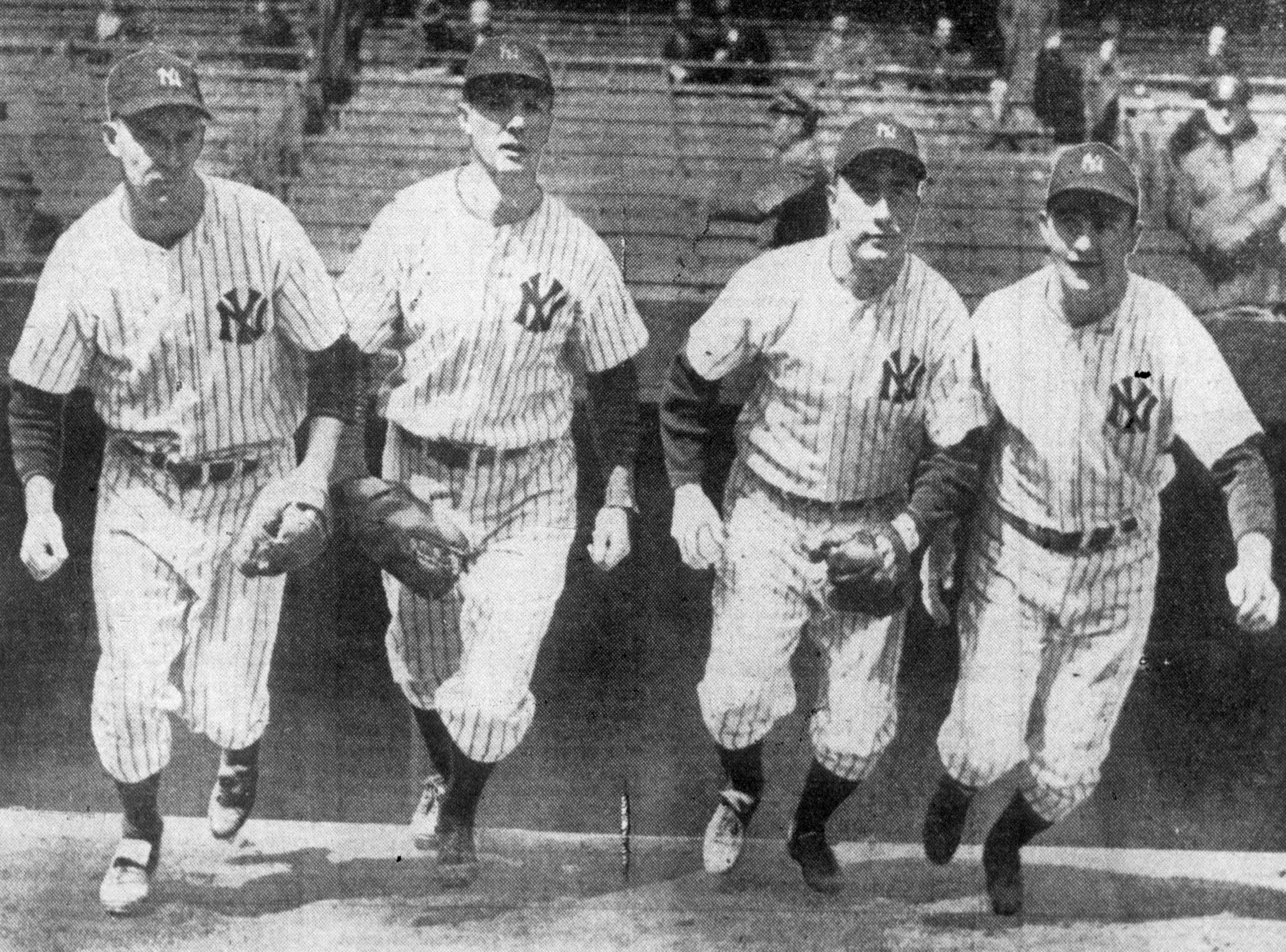
Gordon (left) with his Yankees infield teammates in 1943

Gordon led the Yankees to another pennant in his 1942 MVP season, edging Triple Crown winner Ted Williams of the Boston Red Sox for the award. He batted .322, fourth in the AL, with 18 homers and 103 RBI, and finished sixth in the league in total bases (264) and slugging (.491) while he and Rizzuto again led the league in double plays. He had another poor World Series, however, batting just .095 in the five-game loss to the St. Louis Cardinals – his only Series loss in six trips; he was picked off at second base in the bottom of the ninth in the last game. By his own lofty standards, he had a subpar yet productive season in 1943, batting .249 with 17 home runs (5th in the AL), 69 RBI and 82 runs, and leading the AL in assists; despite his low batting mark, he was still among the league's top ten players in both slugging (.413) and on-base percentage (.365), thanks to a career-best 98 walks (second in the AL).

In the World Series rematch with the Cardinals, he gave New York a 2–1 lead in the fourth inning of Game 1 – a 4–2 win – with a solo homer, and scored the first run in a 2–1 win in Game 4. He threw out the final batter of the Series with the tying runs on base in the 2–0 Game 5 victory, with the Yankees taking home another title. He again fielded brilliantly, setting still-standing records for a five-game Series of 20 putouts, 23 assists, 43 total chances, and a 1.000 fielding average; his 8 assists in Game 1 and 3 assists in the eighth inning of Game 5 are also records. Afterwards, he served in the U.S. Army in 1944–45 during World War II, missing those seasons.

He returned to the Yankees in 1946, which turned out to be his most challenging year in major league baseball. Gordon was spiked in an exhibition game and severed a tendon in his hand, which required surgery, and he suffered a chipped bone in his finger. As the rest of the Yankees headed to The Bronx to begin the 1946 regular season, Gordon stayed behind in Florida for a month to recover. As Gordon told Oregonian sports editor L. H. Gregory, just two weeks after returning to the Yankees lineup, Gordon tore a leg muscle. He taped the leg and resumed playing, only to tear a muscle in his other leg. Following a brief break, Gordon re-tore a leg muscle and then fractured his thumb. Gordon played in just 112 games that year and stepped up to the plate just 376 times, nearly 170 fewer at bats than his pre-war 1943 season. As a result, he batted .210 with 11 home runs and 47 RBI, much to the displeasure of new Yankees president/general manager Larry MacPhail. With Gordon-ally Joe McCarthy resigning from the Yankees club in May 1946 and following his worst season in baseball, Gordon was in trouble. Trade rumors were rampant and MacPhail even consulted Gordon teammate DiMaggio about "Flash's" eventual trade for one of Cleveland's pitchers. Taking DiMaggio's advice, on October 11 MacPhail settled on Indians pitcher Allie Reynolds in exchange for Gordon, a move that benefited both clubs. Gordon departed New York after precisely 1,000 games and 1,000 hits: the only player in baseball history with those statistics.

=== Cleveland Indians ===
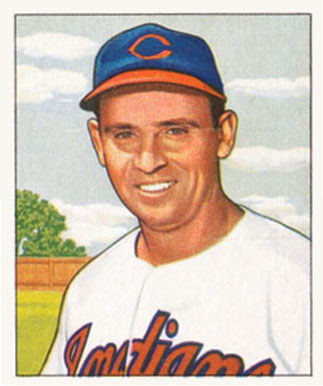
1950 Joe Gordon baseball card

While Reynolds would go on to win 131 games in eight seasons for the Yankees, Gordon proved resilient and kept his new team from regretting the deal. In 1947 he returned to his old levels of production, batting .272 and leading the club with 93 RBI, and again pacing the AL in assists. His 29 homers and 279 total bases were second in the league to Williams, and his .496 slugging average trailed only Williams and DiMaggio; Gordon again finished seventh in the MVP balloting. Additionally, he played a major role in befriending teammate Larry Doby, the AL's first black player, who had been a second baseman in the Negro leagues but became a center fielder with Cleveland. Over Doby's first two seasons, Gordon became close to the player who was theoretically there to replace him, and Doby would later refer to him as his first friend in white baseball; however, reports that Gordon deliberately struck out in Doby's first game to keep him from looking bad are erroneous. 1948 was even better, as Cleveland won their first AL title since 1920. Batting .280, he was second in the league to DiMaggio with 32 home runs, which remained the AL's single-season mark for a second baseman until Bret Boone hit 36 in 2001. He again led the team with a personal high of 124 RBIs, and was sixth in the league in slugging (.507). Gordon placed sixth in the MVP vote, won by teammate and manager Lou Boudreau. In the 1948 World Series against the Boston Braves, batting cleanup, he had a RBI single and later scored to give Cleveland a 2-1 lead in Game 2; they went on to win 4-1. In the final Game 6, he homered to give the Indians a 2-1 lead in the sixth inning, and they went on to win 4-3 to capture the championship. His seven double plays in the Series are still the record for a six-game Series. In 1949 he slipped to a .251 average, though his 20 home runs and 84 RBI were still second on the team to Doby. His major league career ended in 1950 as he hit .236 with 19 home runs and 57 RBI.

Gordon was a career .268 hitter with 253 home runs, 975 RBI, 914 runs, 1,530 hits, 264 doubles and 89 stolen bases in 1,566 games. His .466 slugging average then placed him fifth among second basemen, behind Hornsby (.577), Gehringer (.480), Lazzeri (.467) and Nap Lajoie (.466), and only Hornsby had more homers among second basemen. Gordon might have had even higher batting totals had he played in other stadiums. His first several seasons were spent in Yankee Stadium, with its immense "Death Valley" in left field that frustrated right-handed power hitters; during his New York years, he hit 69 home runs at home and 84 on the road. Municipal Stadium in Cleveland was also an unhelpful venue, being hostile to power hitters on both sides of the plate. Over his career, he batted 23 points higher on the road (.279) than he did at home (.256). He was selected for the All-Star team nine times, in all but his first and last seasons. He was also selected to The Sporting News Major League All-Star Team in 1939–42 and 1947–48, and was runner-up to Gehringer in 1938 and to Billy Herman in 1943. In 2001 he was selected as one of the Indians' 100 greatest players.

== Later years ==
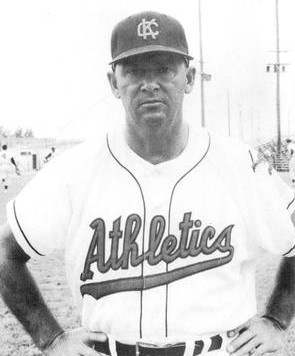
Gordon as manager of the Kansas City Athletics in 1961.

Gordon next became a player-manager with the Pacific Coast League's (PCL) Sacramento Solons in 1951–52. Showing he still had something in the tank, Gordon hit .299 with 43 home runs and 136 RBI in 148 games in 1951, but tailed off badly in 1952, hitting only .246 with just 16 home runs – his fewest since his World War II-shortened 1946 season. His teams also performed poorly under his direction, winning just over 40% of their games in those two years. Gordon then worked as a scout with the Tigers from 1953 to 1955, and as a coach during the early months of the 1956 season. In mid-year he returned to the PCL to manage the 1956–57 San Francisco Seals, winning a pennant in 1957.

He then went on to manage for four different MLB teams. Gordon began his major league managing career with the Indians in 1958, but had difficult relations with general manager Frank Lane, who publicly questioned his decisions. After Gordon announced late in 1959, with Cleveland in second place, that he would not return the next season, Lane fired him four days later. However Lane recanted and apologized after negotiations with Leo Durocher broke down and Gordon was rehired. But in the middle of the 1960 season, he was involved in a rare trade between managers, when the Indians traded him to the Tigers for their skipper Jimmy Dykes. After the season, Gordon was hired by the Kansas City Athletics for 1961. However, owner Charlie Finley fired him on June 19, replacing him with Hank Bauer, and Gordon became a scout and minor league instructor for the Los Angeles / California Angels from 1961 to 1968. In 1969, he had the distinction of managing his second team in Kansas City, this time with the expansion Royals, but lasted only one season with the club before resigning at the end of his one-year contract. Gordon later went into real estate.

== Personal life and death ==
Gordon married Dorothy Irene Crum of Los Angeles in Elkton, Maryland in June 1938, who he had two children with. Gordon went into a Sacramento hospital on April 9, 1974 upon suffering a heart seizure. On April 14, 1978, he had another heart seizure and died at age 63 in Sacramento, California.

== Legacy ==
On August 16, 2008, Gordon was inducted into the Cleveland Indians Hall of Fame. Two of Gordon's grandchildren were present for his induction ceremony. On December 7, 2008, Gordon was elected to the Baseball Hall of Fame by the Veterans Committee with 10 out of 12 possible votes, 83.3%, and was inducted into the Baseball Hall of Fame on July 26, 2009; of the 20 candidates on two ballots, he was the only player to be selected. His only daughter, Judy Gordon of Idaho Falls, Idaho, gave his induction speech in Cooperstown in front of 21,000 people in attendance. "He (Joe) insisted against having a funeral", Judy said in the closing remarks of her speech. "And as such, we consider Cooperstown and the National Baseball Hall of Fame as his final resting place to be honored forever."

Wall Street Journal sports writer Russell Adams wrote a piece titled "Who Is the Greatest Yankee?" Adams ranked Gordon as the 9th-greatest Yankees' position player in franchise history. "Gordon's great strength was defense — his range was the best of any of the 30 candidates we studied."

In 2013, the Bob Feller Act of Valor Award honored Gordon as one of 37 Baseball Hall of Fame members for his service in the United States Army Air Force during World War II.

== Managerial Record ==
Team	Year	Regular season					Postseason			
Team	Year	Games	Won	Lost	Win %	Finish	Won	Lost	Win %	Result
CLE	1958	86	46	40	.535	Interim	–	–	–	
CLE	1959	154	89	65	.578	2nd in AL	–	–	–	
CLE	1960	95	49	46	.516	Traded	–	–	–	
CLE total		335	184	151	.549		0	0	–	
DET	1960	57	26	31	.456	6th in AL	–	–	–	
DET total		57	26	31	.456		0	0	–	
KCA	1961	59	26	33	.441	Fired	–	–	–	
KCA total		59	26	33	.441		0	0	–	
KC	1969	162	69	93	.426	4th in AL West	–	–	–	
KC total		162	69	93	.426		0	0	–	
Total		613	305	308	.498		0	0	–	

== See also ==
- List of Major League Baseball career home run leaders
- List of Major League Baseball players to hit for the cycle
- Major League Baseball Most Valuable Player Award

Achievements
Preceded by Joe Cronin	Hitting for the cycle September 8, 1940	Succeeded by George McQuinn
Sporting positions
Preceded by Joe Marty	Sacramento Solons manager 1951–1952	Succeeded by Gene Desautels
Preceded by Eddie Joost	San Francisco Seals manager 1956–1957	Succeeded by Franchise relocated
