= Stan Isaacs =

American sportswriter and columnist (1929–2013)

Stanley Isaacs (April 22, 1929 – April 3, 2013) was an American sportswriter and columnist most known for his work with Newsday. He was also one of the first columnists to write about televised sports.

== Early life ==
Isaacs was born in Williamsburg, Brooklyn, on April 22, 1929. He attended Eastern District High School and then Brooklyn College before working for the Daily Compass. He moved to Newsday in 1954.

== Time with Newsday ==
Isaacs's column was called Out of Left Field. He covered multiple historic sporting events, including Bobby Thomson's Shot Heard 'Round the World, Roger Maris's chase of Babe Ruth's single-season home run record, bouts between Muhammad Ali and Joe Frazier and the New York Islanders multiple Stanley Cup victories in the late 1970s and early 1980s. He also pushed and promoted the idea of having a statue of Pee Wee Reese and Jackie Robinson constructed. It now stands outside MCU Park, home of the Brooklyn Cyclones.

When he began his televised sports column in 1978, only one other major newspaper had one - the Boston Globe.

He wrote his final Newsday column in 1992.

== Later life and death ==
Isaacs died on April 3, 2013, in Haverford, Pennsylvania.

== See also ==
- Philly.com article
