= Bob Elliott (sportswriter) =

Canadian sports columnist (born 1949)

- Born: September 10, 1949 (age 76); Kingston, Ontario, Canada
- Occupation: Former sports columnist
- Relatives: Chaucer Elliot (grandfather)
- Writing career
- Years active: 1966–2016
- Notable awards: Jack Graney Award (2010); J. G. Taylor Spink Award (2012)
- Baseball career

Member of the Canadian

Baseball Hall of Fame
- Induction: 2015

Bob Elliott (born September 10, 1949) is a Canadian former sports columnist, who covered professional baseball in Canada. He began in 1978 as a reporter for the Ottawa Citizen, covering the Montreal Expos, before leaving in late 1986 to cover the Toronto Blue Jays for the Toronto Sun. Prior to that he worked at the Kingston Whig-Standard and the Ottawa Journal. On June 1, 2016, Elliott stepped back from the newspaper business to concentrate on his website, the Canadian Baseball Network.

He has written four books, including Hard Ball about George Bell, in 1990; The Ultimate Blue Jays Trivia Book, in 1993; The Northern Game: Baseball The Canadian Way, in 2005 and a book on the Toronto Blue Jays from the "If These Walls Could Talk" series. Elliott is also the mind behind the Canadian Baseball Network website, which tracks all active Canadian baseball players.

Elliott received the Career Achievement award from Sports Media Canada in 2008, was inducted into Ottawa-Nepean Canadians Hall of Fame, as part of the inaugural class in 2009 and was inducted into Okotoks Dawgs Hall of Fame in Okotoks Alberta, again as part of the inaugural class. He was awarded the Canadian Baseball Hall of Fame's Jack Graney Award on December 17, 2010. His grandfather, Chaucer Elliott, is a member of the Hockey Hall of Fame. On December 6, 2011, he was named recipient of the 2012 J. G. Taylor Spink Award by the National Baseball Hall of Fame and Museum. He was presented with Ontario Baseball Association President’s Award in 2012 and was inducted into Kingston and District Hall of Fame in 2013. On February 4, 2015, Elliott was elected to the Canadian Baseball Hall of Fame. In 2016, Elliott was named to the Ontario Sports Hall of Fame as the winner of the Brian Williams Media Award. He was inducted into Baseball Ontario Hall of Fame in 2018.
