= Baseball Hall of Fame balloting =

Baseball Hall of Fame balloting may refer to:

== National Baseball Hall of Fame and Museum ==
- The general selection process for National Baseball Hall of Fame and Museum
- The selection process for the National Baseball Hall of Fame and Museum in a given year:

  - 1936 Baseball Hall of Fame balloting
  - 1937 Baseball Hall of Fame balloting
  - 1938 Baseball Hall of Fame balloting
  - 1939 Baseball Hall of Fame balloting
  - 1942 Baseball Hall of Fame balloting
  - 1944 Baseball Hall of Fame balloting
  - 1945 Baseball Hall of Fame balloting
  - 1946 Baseball Hall of Fame balloting
  - 1947 Baseball Hall of Fame balloting
  - 1948 Baseball Hall of Fame balloting
  - 1949 Baseball Hall of Fame balloting
  - 1950 Baseball Hall of Fame balloting
  - 1951 Baseball Hall of Fame balloting
  - 1952 Baseball Hall of Fame balloting
  - 1953 Baseball Hall of Fame balloting
  - 1954 Baseball Hall of Fame balloting
  - 1955 Baseball Hall of Fame balloting
  - 1956 Baseball Hall of Fame balloting
  - 1957 Baseball Hall of Fame balloting
  - 1958 Baseball Hall of Fame balloting
  - 1959 Baseball Hall of Fame balloting
  - 1960 Baseball Hall of Fame balloting
  - 1961 Baseball Hall of Fame balloting
  - 1962 Baseball Hall of Fame balloting
  - 1963 Baseball Hall of Fame balloting
  - 1964 Baseball Hall of Fame balloting
  - 1965 Baseball Hall of Fame balloting
  - 1966 Baseball Hall of Fame balloting
  - 1967 Baseball Hall of Fame balloting
  - 1968 Baseball Hall of Fame balloting
  - 1969 Baseball Hall of Fame balloting
  - 1970 Baseball Hall of Fame balloting
  - 1971 Baseball Hall of Fame balloting
  - 1972 Baseball Hall of Fame balloting
  - 1973 Baseball Hall of Fame balloting
  - 1974 Baseball Hall of Fame balloting
  - 1975 Baseball Hall of Fame balloting
  - 1976 Baseball Hall of Fame balloting
  - 1977 Baseball Hall of Fame balloting
  - 1978 Baseball Hall of Fame balloting
  - 1979 Baseball Hall of Fame balloting
  - 1980 Baseball Hall of Fame balloting
  - 1981 Baseball Hall of Fame balloting
  - 1982 Baseball Hall of Fame balloting
  - 1983 Baseball Hall of Fame balloting
  - 1984 Baseball Hall of Fame balloting
  - 1985 Baseball Hall of Fame balloting
  - 1986 Baseball Hall of Fame balloting
  - 1987 Baseball Hall of Fame balloting
  - 1988 Baseball Hall of Fame balloting
  - 1989 Baseball Hall of Fame balloting
  - 1990 Baseball Hall of Fame balloting
  - 1991 Baseball Hall of Fame balloting
  - 1992 Baseball Hall of Fame balloting
  - 1993 Baseball Hall of Fame balloting
  - 1994 Baseball Hall of Fame balloting
  - 1995 Baseball Hall of Fame balloting
  - 1996 Baseball Hall of Fame balloting
  - 1997 Baseball Hall of Fame balloting
  - 1998 Baseball Hall of Fame balloting
  - 1999 Baseball Hall of Fame balloting
  - 2000 Baseball Hall of Fame balloting
  - 2001 Baseball Hall of Fame balloting
  - 2002 Baseball Hall of Fame balloting
  - 2003 Baseball Hall of Fame balloting
  - 2004 Baseball Hall of Fame balloting
  - 2005 Baseball Hall of Fame balloting
  - 2006 Baseball Hall of Fame balloting
  - 2007 Baseball Hall of Fame balloting
  - 2008 Baseball Hall of Fame balloting
  - 2009 Baseball Hall of Fame balloting
  - 2010 Baseball Hall of Fame balloting
  - 2011 Baseball Hall of Fame balloting
  - 2012 Baseball Hall of Fame balloting
  - 2013 Baseball Hall of Fame balloting
  - 2014 Baseball Hall of Fame balloting
  - 2015 Baseball Hall of Fame balloting
  - 2016 Baseball Hall of Fame balloting
  - 2017 Baseball Hall of Fame balloting
  - 2018 Baseball Hall of Fame balloting
  - 2019 Baseball Hall of Fame balloting
  - 2020 Baseball Hall of Fame balloting
  - 2021 Baseball Hall of Fame balloting
  - 2022 Baseball Hall of Fame balloting
  - 2023 Baseball Hall of Fame balloting
  - 2024 Baseball Hall of Fame balloting
  - 2025 Baseball Hall of Fame balloting
  - 2026 Baseball Hall of Fame balloting
  - 2027 Baseball Hall of Fame balloting

== Other ==
- The general selection process for the Canadian Baseball Hall of Fame
- The general selection process for National College Baseball Hall of Fame

== See also ==
- Japanese Baseball Hall of Fame
