= 1978 Baseball Hall of Fame balloting =

Elections to the Baseball Hall of Fame

National Baseball

Hall of Fame and Museum
- New inductees: 3
- via BBWAA: 1
- via Veterans Committee: 2
- Total inductees: 166
- Induction date: August 7, 1978

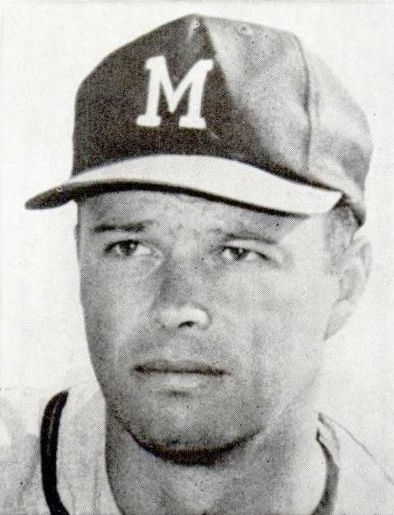
1978 BBWAA inductee Eddie Mathews

Elections to the Baseball Hall of Fame for 1978 introduced a new system that would continue to 1994. The Baseball Writers' Association of America (BBWAA) voted by mail to select from recent major league players and elected Eddie Mathews. The Veterans Committee met in closed sessions to consider older major league players as well as managers, umpires, executives, and figures from the Negro leagues. It selected Addie Joss and Larry MacPhail. A formal induction ceremony was held in Cooperstown, New York, on August 7, 1978, with Commissioner of Baseball Bowie Kuhn presiding.

The special committee on Negro leagues had disbanded after its 1977 meeting. Two of its members were appointed to the Veterans Committee, as part of expanding that body from twelve to eighteen members. Its responsibilities were extended to cover the Negro leagues, which would continue until the next reform in 1994.

== BBWAA election ==
The BBWAA was authorized to elect players active in 1958 or later, but not after 1972; the ballot included candidates from the 1977 ballot who received at least 5% of the vote but were not elected, along with selected players, chosen by a screening committee, whose last appearance was in 1972. All 10-year members of the BBWAA were eligible to vote.

Voters were instructed to cast votes for up to 10 candidates; any candidate receiving votes on at least 75% of the ballots would be honored with induction to the Hall. The ballot consisted of 36 players; a total of 379 ballots were cast, with 285 votes required for election. A total of 2,779 individual votes were cast, an average of 7.33 per ballot. Those candidates receiving less than 5% of the vote will not appear on future BBWAA ballots but may eventually be considered by the Veterans Committee.

Candidates who were eligible for the first time are indicated here with a dagger (†). The one candidate who received at least 75% of the vote and was elected is indicated in bold italics; candidates who have since been elected in subsequent elections are indicated in italics.

Player	Votes	Percent	Change
**Eddie Mathews**	301	79.4	▲17.0%
Enos Slaughter	261	68.9	▲10.9%
Duke Snider	254	67.0	▲11.6%
Gil Hodges	226	59.6	▲1.1%
Don Drysdale	219	57.8	▲6.4%
Jim Bunning	181	47.8	▲9.7%
Richie Ashburn	158	41.7	▲5.4%
Hoyt Wilhelm†	158	41.7	-
Nellie Fox	149	39.3	▼0.4%
Red Schoendienst	130	34.3	▲6.9%
Maury Wills†	115	30.3	-
Roger Maris	83	21.9	▲0.5%
Lew Burdette	76	20.1	▼2.1%
Mickey Vernon	66	17.4	▲3.8%
Alvin Dark	60	15.8	▼1.4%
Harvey Kuenn	58	15.3	▲0.4%
Ted Kluszewski	51	13.5	▼0.9%
Don Newcombe	48	12.7	▲1.5%
Elston Howard	41	10.8	▼0.4%
Don Larsen	32	8.4	▼1.8%
Roy Face	27	7.1	▼1.5%
Bill Mazeroski†	23	6.1	-
Ken Boyer	18	4.7	▲1.0%
Curt Flood	8	2.1	▼2.1%
Harvey Haddix	7	1.8	-
Del Crandall	6	1.6	▼0.5%
Vern Law	6	1.6	▲0.3%
Bobby Thomson	5	1.3	▼1.3%
Vic Wertz	4	1.1	▲0.1%
Dick Groat	3	0.8	▼0.2%
Jim Maloney†	2	0.5	-
Clete Boyer†	1	0.3	-
Denny McLain†	1	0.3	-
Camilo Pascual	1	0.3	-
Mudcat Grant†	0	0.0	-
Pedro Ramos†	0	0.0	-

Key to colors
Elected to the Hall. These individuals are also indicated in **bold italics**.
Players who were elected in future elections. These individuals are also indicated in plain italics.
Players not yet elected who returned on the 1979 ballot.
Eliminated from future BBWAA voting. These individuals remain eligible for future Veterans Committee consideration.

Roberto Clemente, who died following the 1972 season, was included on the 1973 ballot under a standard provision for players who die before the five-year waiting period has elapsed.

The newly-eligible players included 18 All-Stars, 11 of whom were not included on the ballot, representing a total of 39 All-Star selections. Among the new candidates were 7-time All-Star Bill Mazeroski and 5-time All-Stars Hoyt Wilhelm and Maury Wlls. The field included two MVPs (Wills and Denny McLain), one Cy Young Award winner (Denny McLain, who received the MVP the same year as one of his two Cy Young Awards; that same season, he was the last pitcher to win thirty games in a season) and two Rookies of the Year (Ron Hansen and Gary Peters). Bill Mazeroski also had eight Gold Gloves at Second Base, the record at the time.

Players eligible for the first time who were not included on the ballot were: Ted Abernathy, Joe Azcue, John Bateman, Wade Blasingame, Don Buford, Donn Clendenon, Tony Cloninger, Moe Drabowsky, Joe Gibbon, Tom Haller, Steve Hamilton, Ron Hansen, Joe Horlen, Julián Javier, Denny Lemaster, J. C. Martin, Don Mincher, Gary Peters, Phil Regan, Jim Roland, Ron Taylor, Stan Williams, and Bobby Wine.

== J. G. Taylor Spink Award ==
Gordon Cobbledick (1898–1969) and Edgar Munzel (1907–2002) received the J. G. Taylor Spink Award honoring baseball writers. The awards were voted at the December 1977 meeting of the BBWAA, and included in the summer 1978 ceremonies.
