= The Magnificent Yankee =

The Magnificent Yankee may refer to:

- The Magnificent Yankee (play) (1946), by Emmet Lavery
  - The Magnificent Yankee (1950 film), adapted by Emmet Lavery and directed by John Sturges
  - The Magnificent Yankee (1965 film), adapted by Robert Hartung, and directed by George Schaefer

== See also ==
- The Magnificent Yankees, a 1952 book by Tom Meany about members of the New York Yankees
