= Tommy Holmes (sportswriter) =

American sportswriter (1903–1975)

- Born: November 5, 1903; Brooklyn, New York
- Died: March 25, 1975 (aged 71); Brooklyn, New York
- Occupations: Sportswriter & author
- Years active: 1924–1957
- Awards: J. G. Taylor Spink Award

Thomas Holmes (November 5, 1903 – March 25, 1975) was an American sports writer who covered the Brooklyn Dodgers for the Brooklyn Eagle and the New York Herald-Tribune, from 1924 to 1957.

Holmes, who only had one arm, died in March 1975 at age 71.

He was posthumously awarded the J. G. Taylor Spink Award by the Baseball Writers' Association of America (BBWAA), announced in 1979 and bestowed in 1980.

== Works ==
- Holmes, Tommy (1953). Dodger Daze and Knights. David McKay Publications. ASIN B0007DSQVU.
- Meany, Tom; Holmes, Tommy (1964). Baseball's Best: The All-Time Major League Baseball Team. Franklin Watts. ASIN B0006BM6OG.
- Holmes, Tommy (1975). The Dodgers. Macmillan Publishers. ASIN B000O95R28.
