= 1984 Baseball Hall of Fame balloting =

Elections to the Baseball Hall of Fame

National Baseball

Hall of Fame and Museum
- New inductees: 5
- via BBWAA: 3
- via Veterans Committee: 2
- Total inductees: 189
- Induction date: August 12, 1984

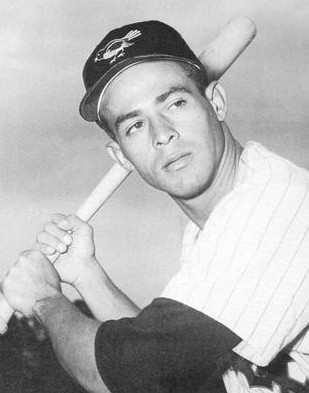
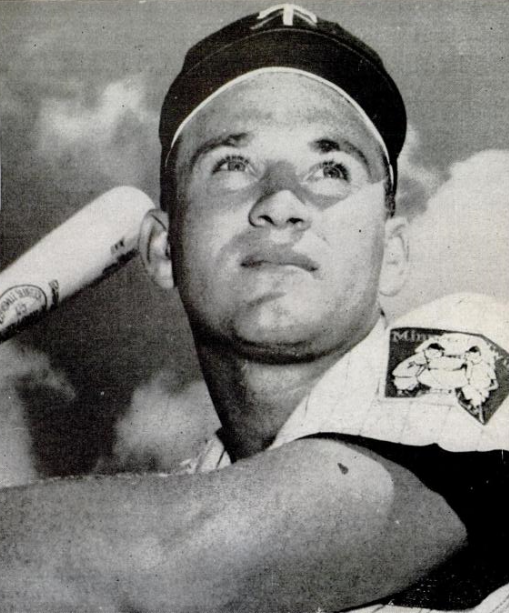
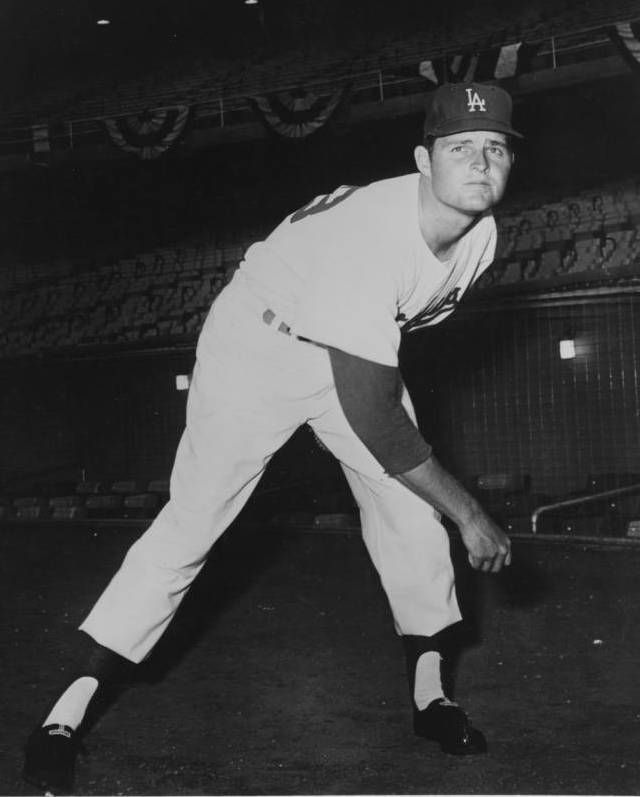
1984 BBWAA inductees (L-R): Luis Aparicio, Harmon Killebrew, and Don Drysdale

Elections to the Baseball Hall of Fame for 1984 followed the system in place since 1978. The Baseball Writers' Association of America (BBWAA) voted by mail to select from recent major league players and elected three: Luis Aparicio, Don Drysdale, and Harmon Killebrew. The Veterans Committee met in closed sessions to consider older major league players as well as managers, umpires, executives, and figures from the Negro leagues. It selected two players, Rick Ferrell and Pee Wee Reese. A formal induction ceremony was held in Cooperstown, New York, on August 12, 1984.

== BBWAA election ==
The BBWAA was authorized to elect players active in 1964 or later, but not after 1978; the ballot included candidates from the 1983 ballot who received at least 5% of the vote but were not elected, along with selected players, chosen by a screening committee, whose last appearance was in 1978. All 10-year members of the BBWAA were eligible to vote.

Voters were instructed to cast votes for up to 10 candidates; any candidate receiving votes on at least 75% of the ballots would be honored with induction to the Hall. The ballot consisted of 29 players; a total of 403 ballots were cast, with 303 votes required for election. A total of 2,905 individual votes were cast, an average of 7.21 per ballot. Those candidates receiving less than 5% of the vote will not appear on future BBWAA ballots, but may eventually be considered by the Veterans Committee.

Candidates who were eligible for the first time are indicated here with a dagger (†). The candidates who received at least 75% of the vote and were elected are indicated in bold italics; candidates who have since been elected in subsequent elections are indicated in italics. The candidates who received less than 5% of the vote, thus becoming ineligible for future BBWAA consideration, are indicated with an asterisk (*).

Key to colors
Elected to the Hall. These individuals are also indicated in **bold italics**.
Players who were elected in future elections. These individuals are also indicated in plain italics.
Players not yet elected who returned on the 1985 ballot.
Eliminated from future BBWAA voting. These individuals remain eligible for future Veterans Committee consideration.

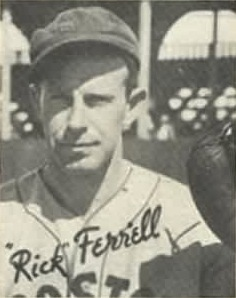
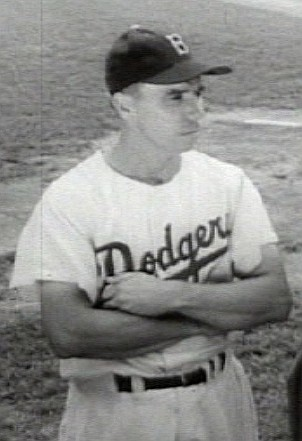
1984 Veterans Committee inductees Rick Ferrell (left) and Pee Wee Reese

Player	Votes	Percent	Change	Year
**Luis Aparicio**	341	84.6	▲17.2%	6th
**Harmon Killebrew**	335	83.1	▲11.2%	4th
**Don Drysdale**	316	78.4	▲13.7%	10th
Hoyt Wilhelm	290	72.0	▲7.0%	7th
Nellie Fox	246	61.0	▲14.7%	14th
Billy Williams	202	50.1	▲9.2%	3rd
Jim Bunning	201	49.9	▲13.0%	8th
Orlando Cepeda	124	30.8	▲15.0%	5th
Tony Oliva	124	30.8	▲10.7%	3rd
Roger Maris	107	26.6	▲8.2%	11th
Harvey Kuenn	106	26.3	▲5.7%	8th
Maury Wills	104	25.8	▲5.2%	7th
Lew Burdette	97	24.1	▲12.6%	12th
Bill Mazeroski	74	18.4	▲5.6%	7th
Roy Face	65	16.1	▲7.5%	9th
Elston Howard	45	11.2	▲2.6%	11th
Joe Torre	45	11.2	▲5.9%	2nd
Thurman Munson	29	7.2	▲2.4%	4th
Don Larsen	25	6.2	▲0.3%	11th
Wilbur Wood†*	14	3.5	-	1st
Jim Fregosi†*	4	1.0	-	1st
Jim Bouton†*	3	0.7	-	1st
Davey Johnson†*	3	0.7	-	1st
Mickey Stanley†*	2	0.5	-	1st
Bob Bailey†*	1	0.2	-	1st
Nelson Briles†*	1	0.2	-	1st
Clay Carroll†*	1	0.2	-	1st
Jim Colborn†*	0	0.0	-	1st
Ron Fairly†*	0	0.0	-	1st

The newly-eligible players included 12 All-Stars, five of whom were not included on the ballot, representing a total of 25 All-Star selections. Jim Fregosi, who was selected to the All Star Game six times, was the only newly eligible player selected at least five times.

Players eligible for the first time who were not included on the ballot were: Sandy Alomar Sr., Andy Etchebarren, Al Fitzmorris, Tito Fuentes, Wayne Garrett, Cito Gaston, Larry Haney, Ed Herrmann, Joe Lahoud, Paul Lindblad, Dave May, Marty Perez, Bill Plummer, and Gary Sutherland.

== J. G. Taylor Spink Award ==
Ken Smith (1902–1991) received the J. G. Taylor Spink Award honoring a baseball writer. The award was voted at the December 1983 meeting of the BBWAA, and included in the summer 1984 ceremonies.
