= Reichler =

Reichler is a German language surname. It stems from the male given name Richard – and may refer to:

- Claudia Reichler (1963), German former footballer
- Joe Reichler (1915–1988), American sports writer
