= 1989 Baseball Hall of Fame balloting =

Elections to the Baseball Hall of Fame

National Baseball

Hall of Fame and Museum
- New inductees: 4
- via BBWAA: 2
- via Veterans Committee: 2
- Total inductees: 204
- Induction date: July 23, 1989

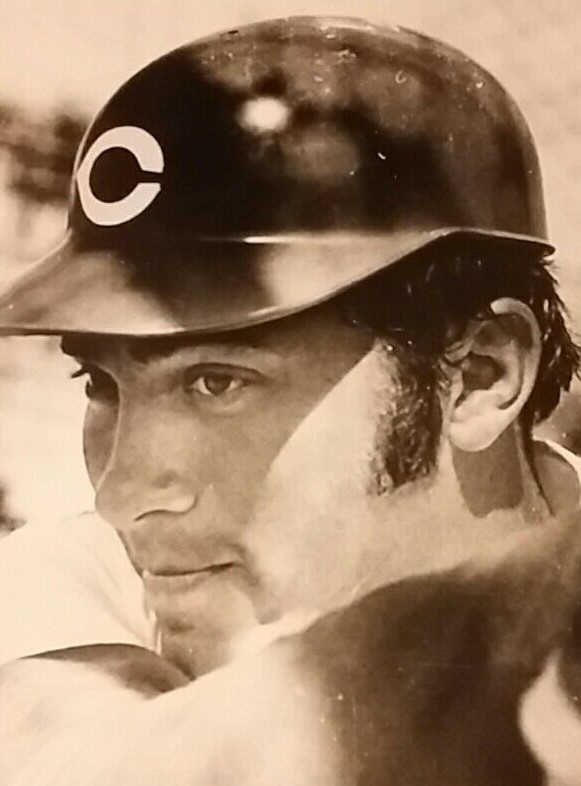
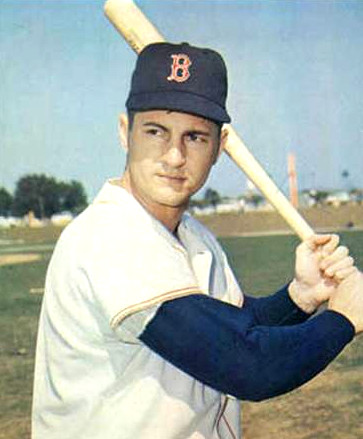
1989 BBWAA inductees Johnny Bench (left) and Carl Yastrzemski

Elections to the Baseball Hall of Fame for 1989 followed the system in place since 1978. The Baseball Writers' Association of America (BBWAA) voted by mail to select from recent major league players and elected two, Johnny Bench and Carl Yastrzemski. The Veterans Committee met in closed sessions to consider older major league players as well as managers, umpires, executives, and figures from the Negro leagues. It also selected two people, Al Barlick and Red Schoendienst. A formal induction ceremony was held in Cooperstown, New York, on July 23, 1989.

== BBWAA election ==
The BBWAA was authorized to elect players active in 1969 or later, but not after 1983; the ballot included candidates from the 1988 ballot who received at least 5% of the vote but were not elected, along with selected players, chosen by a screening committee, whose last appearance was in 1983. All 10-year members of the BBWAA were eligible to vote.

Voters were instructed to cast votes for up to 10 candidates; any candidate receiving votes on at least 75% of the ballots would be honored with induction to the Hall. The ballot consisted of 41 players; a total of 447 ballots were cast, with 336 votes required for election. A total of 3,016 individual votes were cast, an average of 6.75 per ballot. Those candidates receiving less than 5% of the vote would not appear on future BBWAA ballots, but could eventually be considered by the Veterans Committee.

Candidates who were eligible for the first time are indicated here with a dagger (†). The two candidates who received at least 75% of the vote and were elected are indicated in bold italics; candidates who have since been elected in subsequent elections are indicated in italics. The 20 candidates who received less than 5% of the vote, thus becoming ineligible for future BBWAA consideration, are indicated with an asterisk (*).

Player	Votes	Percent	Change	Year
**Johnny Bench**†	431	96.4	-	1st
**Carl Yastrzemski**†	423	94.6	-	1st
Gaylord Perry†	304	68.0	-	1st
Jim Bunning	283	63.3	▼10.9%	13th
Fergie Jenkins†	234	52.3	-	1st
Orlando Cepeda	176	39.4	▼7.2%	10th
Tony Oliva	135	30.2	▼17.1%	8th
Bill Mazeroski	134	30.0	▼3.5%	12th
Harvey Kuenn	115	25.7	▼13.6%	13th
Maury Wills	95	21.3	▼8.4%	12th
Jim Kaat†	87	19.5	-	1st
Ron Santo	75	16.8	▼8.5%	6th
Ken Boyer	62	13.9	▼11.6%	10th
Minnie Miñoso	59	13.2	▼7.9%	5th
Roy Face	47	10.5	▼8.0%	14th
Mickey Lolich	47	10.5	▼15.0%	5th
Luis Tiant	47	10.5	▼20.4%	2nd
Joe Torre	40	8.9	▼5.2%	7th
Dick Allen	35	7.8	▼4.4%	7th
Vada Pinson	33	7.4	▼8.3%	8th
Thurman Munson	31	6.9	▼0.6%	9th
Bobby Bonds	29	6.5	▲0.2%	3rd
Curt Flood	27	6.0	▼5.2%	8th
Sparky Lyle	25	5.6	▼7.5%	2nd
Bert Campaneris†*	14	3.1	-	1st
Wilbur Wood*	14	3.1	▼3.9%	6th
Manny Mota*	9	2.0	▼2.2%	2nd
Bobby Murcer†*	3	0.7	-	1st
Don Money†*	1	0.2	-	1st
Gene Tenace†*	1	0.2	-	1st
Jim Barr†*	0	0.0	-	1st
Terry Crowley†*	0	0.0	-	1st
Joe Ferguson†*	0	0.0	-	1st
Woodie Fryman†*	0	0.0	-	1st
César Gerónimo†*	0	0.0	-	1st
Dave Goltz†*	0	0.0	-	1st
Jon Matlack†*	0	0.0	-	1st
Rudy May†*	0	0.0	-	1st
Bake McBride†*	0	0.0	-	1st
Bill Robinson†*	0	0.0	-	1st
Richie Zisk†*	0	0.0	-	1st

Key to colors
Elected to the Hall. These individuals are also indicated in **bold italics**.
Players who were elected in future elections. These individuals are also indicated in plain italics.
Players not yet elected who returned on the 1990 ballot.
Eliminated from future BBWAA voting. These individuals remain eligible for future Veterans Committee consideration.

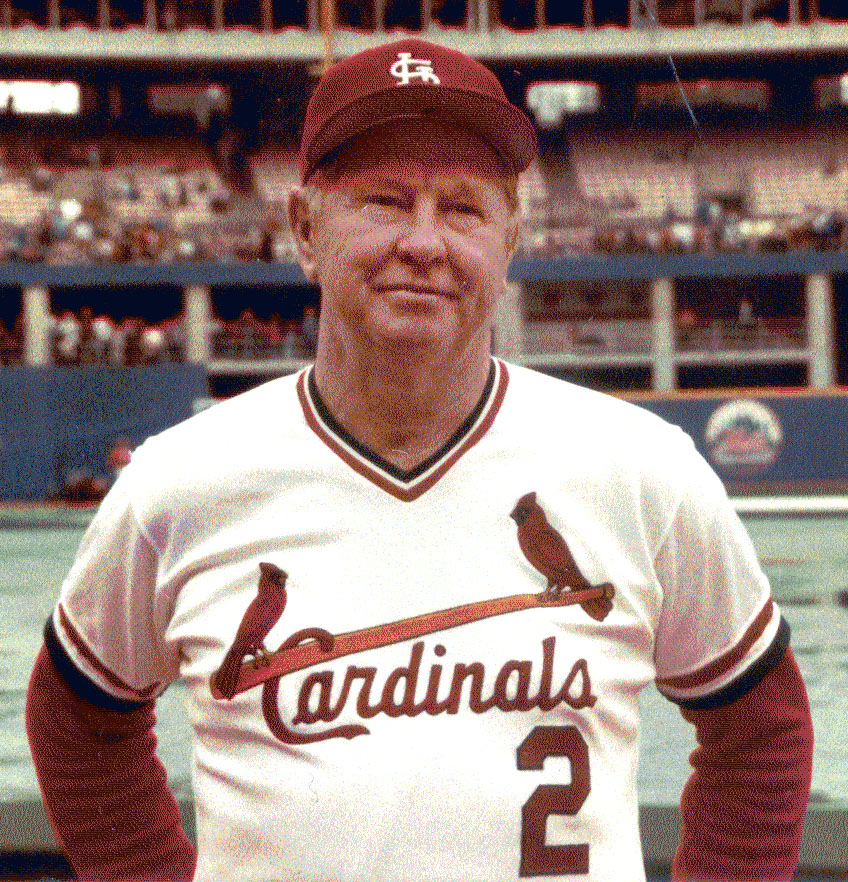
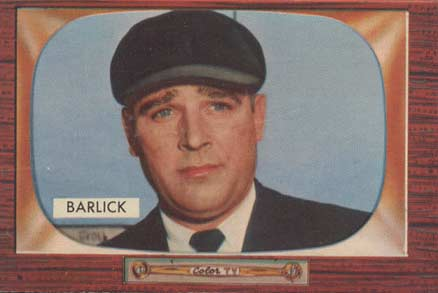
1989 Veterans Committee inductees Red Schoendienst (left) and Al Barlick

The newly eligible players included 16 All-Stars, three of whom were not included on the ballot, representing a total of 71 All-Star selections. Among the new candidates were 18-time All-Star Carl Yastrzemski, 14-time All-Star Johnny Bench, 6-time All-Star Bert Campaneris and 5-time All-Stars Bobby Murcer and Gaylord Perry. The field included two Most Valuable Players (Bench, who won twice, and Yastrzemski), two Cy Young Award-winners (Ferguson Jenkins and Gaylord Perry, who won twice) and three Rookies of the Year (Bench, John Matlack and Bake McBride). The field also included some prominent Gold Glove winners: Jim Kaat, whose 16 at pitcher was the record until broken by Greg Maddux; Johnny Bench, whose 10 at catcher was the record until broken by Iván Rodríguez; and Carl Yastrzemski, who won seven as an outfielder.

Players eligible for the first time who were not included on the ballot were: Larry Biittner, Doug Bird, Tim Blackwell, Bill Castro, Larry Christenson, Bill Fahey, Ed Farmer, Don Hood, Mike Ivie, Dave LaRoche, Randy Moffitt, Jerry Morales, Rowland Office, Mike Phillips, Steve Renko, Aurelio Rodríguez, Elías Sosa, Jerry Turner and Otto Vélez.

== J. G. Taylor Spink Award ==
Bob Hunter (1913–1993) and Ray Kelly (1914–1988) received the J. G. Taylor Spink Award honoring baseball writers. The awards were voted at the December 1988 meeting of the BBWAA, and included in the summer 1989 ceremonies.
