= 1976 Baseball Hall of Fame balloting =

Elections to the Baseball Hall of Fame

National Baseball

Hall of Fame and Museum
- New inductees: 6
- via BBWAA: 2
- via Veterans Committee: 3
- via Negro Leagues Committee: 1
- Total inductees: 157
- Induction date: August 9, 1976

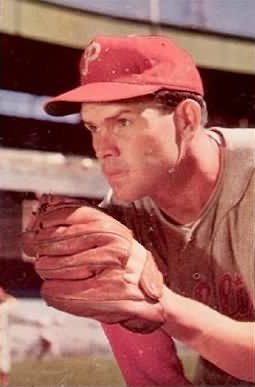
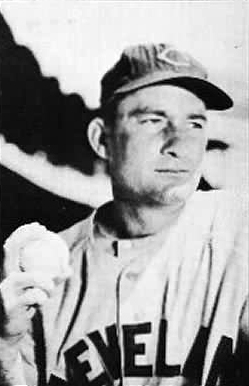
1976 BBWAA inductees Robin Roberts (left) and Bob Lemon

Elections to the Baseball Hall of Fame for 1976 followed the system in place since 1971. The Baseball Writers' Association of America (BBWAA) voted by mail to select from recent major league players and elected two, Bob Lemon and Robin Roberts. The Veterans Committee met in closed sessions to consider executives, managers, umpires, and earlier major league players. It selected three players: Roger Connor, Cal Hubbard, and Freddie Lindstrom. The Negro Leagues Committee also met in person and selected Oscar Charleston. A formal induction ceremony was held in Cooperstown, New York, on August 9, 1976, with Commissioner of Baseball Bowie Kuhn presiding.

== BBWAA election ==
The BBWAA was authorized to elect players active in 1956 or later, but not after 1970; the ballot included candidates from the 1975 ballot who received at least 5% of the vote but were not elected, along with selected players, chosen by a screening committee, whose last appearance was in 1970. All 10-year members of the BBWAA were eligible to vote.

Voters were instructed to cast votes for up to 10 candidates; any candidate receiving votes on at least 75% of the ballots would be honored with induction to the Hall. The ballot consisted of 32 players; a total of 388 ballots were cast, with 291 votes required for election. A total of 2,937 individual votes were cast, an average of 7.57 per ballot.

Candidates who were eligible for the first time are indicated here with a dagger (†). The two candidates who received at least 75% of the vote and was elected is indicated in bold italics; candidates who have since been elected in subsequent elections are indicated in italics.

Phil Rizzuto was on the ballot for the final time.

Player	Votes	Percent	Change
**Robin Roberts**	337	86.9	▲14.2%
**Bob Lemon**	305	78.6	▲14.2%
Gil Hodges	233	60.1	▲8.2%
Enos Slaughter	197	50.8	▲1.9%
Eddie Mathews	189	48.7	▲7.8%
Pee Wee Reese	186	47.9	▲5.4%
Nellie Fox	174	44.8	▲23.8%
Duke Snider	159	41.0	▲5.4%
Phil Rizzuto	149	38.4	▲6.1%
George Kell	129	33.2	▲1.7%
Red Schoendienst	129	33.2	▲7.2%
Don Drysdale	114	29.4	▲8.4%
Roger Maris	87	22.4	▲3.1%
Richie Ashburn	85	21.9	▲0.9%
Alvin Dark	62	16.0	▲2.7%
Walker Cooper	56	14.4	▲10.8%
Elston Howard	55	14.2	▲7.8%
Mickey Vernon	52	13.4	▲7.3%
Ted Kluszewski	50	12.9	▲3.8%
Don Larsen	47	12.1	▲5.7%
Roy Face†	23	5.9	-
Lew Burdette	21	5.4	▲2.4%
Don Newcombe	21	5.4	▲2.4%
Ken Boyer	15	3.9	▲1.4%
Del Crandall†	15	3.9	-
Vern Law	9	2.3	▲0.6%
Bobby Thomson	9	2.3	▼0.5%
Harvey Haddix	8	2.1	▼0.1%
Dick Groat	7	1.8	▲0.7%
Bill White	7	1.8	▼0.1%
Vic Wertz	5	1.3	▼0.1%
Johnny Podres	2	0.5	▼0.3%

Key to colors
Elected to the Hall. These individuals are also indicated in **bold italics**.
Players who were elected in future elections. These individuals are also indicated in plain italics.
Players not yet elected who returned on the 1977 ballot.
Eliminated from future BBWAA voting. These individuals remain eligible for future Veterans Committee consideration.

The newly-eligible players included 9 All-Stars, 7 of whom were not included on the ballot, representing a total of 28 All-Star selections. Among the new candidates were 8-time All-Star Del Crandall and 6-time All-Star John Roseboro. The field included one Rookie of the Year (Bob Allison).

Players eligible for the first time who were not included on the ballot were: Jerry Adair, Hank Aguirre, Bob Allison, Gerry Arrigo, Don Cardwell, Jim Davenport, Tito Francona, Gary Geiger, Bob Johnson, Ken Johnson, Lou Klimchock, Ron Kline, Al McBean, Pedro Ramos, Rich Rollins, John Roseboro, Tom Satriano, Russ Snyder, Lee Stange, Hawk Taylor, Ray Washburn and Earl Wilson.

== J. G. Taylor Spink Award ==
Tom Meany (1903–1964) and Shirley Povich (1905–1998) received the J. G. Taylor Spink Award honoring baseball writers. The awards were voted at the December 1975 meeting of the BBWAA, and included in the summer 1976 ceremonies.
