= 1974 Baseball Hall of Fame balloting =

Elections to the Baseball Hall of Fame

National Baseball

Hall of Fame and Museum
- New inductees: 6
- via BBWAA: 2
- via Veterans Committee: 3
- via Negro Leagues Committee: 1
- Total inductees: 146
- Induction date: August 12, 1974

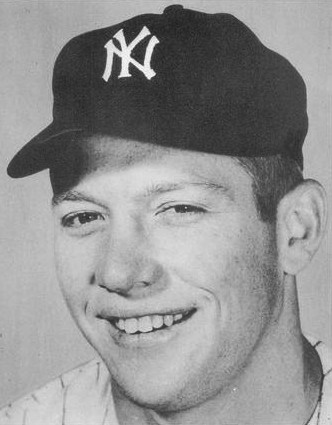
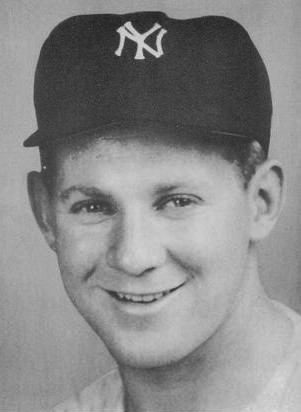
1974 BBWAA inductees Mickey Mantle (left) and Whitey Ford

Elections to the Baseball Hall of Fame for 1974 followed the system in place since 1971. The Baseball Writers' Association of America (BBWAA) voted by mail to select from recent major league players and elected two, Whitey Ford and Mickey Mantle. The Veterans Committee met in closed sessions to consider executives, managers, umpires, and earlier major league players. It selected three people: Jim Bottomley, Jocko Conlan, and Sam Thompson. The Negro Leagues Committee also met in person and selected Cool Papa Bell. A formal induction ceremony was held in Cooperstown, New York, on August 12, 1974, with Commissioner of Baseball Bowie Kuhn presiding.

== BBWAA election ==
The BBWAA was authorized to elect players active in 1954 or later, but not after 1968; the ballot included candidates from the 1973 ballot who received at least 5% of the vote but were not elected, along with selected players, chosen by a screening committee, whose last appearance was in 1968. All 10-year members of the BBWAA were eligible to vote.

Voters were instructed to cast votes for up to 10 candidates; any candidate receiving votes on at least 75% of the ballots would be honored with induction to the Hall. Results of the 1974 election by the BBWAA were announced on January 16. The ballot consisted of 42 players; a total of 365 ballots were cast, with 274 votes required for election. A total of 3,000 individual votes were cast, an average of 8.22 per ballot.

Candidates who were eligible for the first time are indicated here with a dagger (†). The two candidates who received at least 75% of the vote and were elected are indicated in bold italics; candidates who have since been elected in subsequent elections are indicated in italics.

Allie Reynolds was on the ballot for the final time.

Player	Votes	Percent	Change
**Mickey Mantle**†	322	88.2	-
**Whitey Ford**	284	77.8	▲10.7%
Robin Roberts	224	61.4	▲5.3%
Ralph Kiner	215	58.9	▼2.9%
Gil Hodges	198	54.2	▼3.2%
Bob Lemon	190	52.1	▲5.5%
Enos Slaughter	145	39.7	▲1.5%
Pee Wee Reese	141	38.6	▲5.4%
Eddie Mathews†	118	32.3	-
Phil Rizzuto	111	30.4	▲1.2%
Duke Snider	111	30.4	▲3.8%
Red Schoendienst	110	30.1	▲4.8%
Allie Reynolds	101	27.7	▲3.2%
George Kell	94	25.8	▼4.2%
Nellie Fox	79	21.6	▲2.4%
Roger Maris†	78	21.4	-
Hal Newhouser	73	20.0	▼0.8%
Phil Cavarretta	61	16.7	▼2.5%
Richie Ashburn	56	15.3	▲8.7%
Alvin Dark	54	14.8	▲0.9%
Johnny Sain	51	14.0	▲1.6%
Don Larsen†	29	7.9	-
Ted Kluszewski	28	7.7	▲4.0%
Mickey Vernon	27	7.4	▲1.3%
Elston Howard†	19	5.2	-
Carl Erskine	11	3.0	▲1.9%
Walker Cooper	9	2.5	▲0.4%
Harvey Haddix	8	2.2	▲1.9%
Lew Burdette	7	1.9	▼1.3%
Don Newcombe	7	1.9	▼1%
Bobby Thomson	6	1.6	▲0.8%
Dick Groat	4	1.1	▼0.7%
Roy McMillan	4	1.1	▼0.2%
Billy Pierce	4	1.1	-
Gil McDougald	3	0.8	▲0.3%
Vic Raschi	3	0.8	▼1.0%
Bobby Shantz	3	0.8	▼0.5%
Curt Simmons	3	0.8	▼0.5%
Bill Virdon†	3	0.8	-
Smoky Burgess	2	0.5	▲0.2%
Rocky Colavito†	2	0.5	-
Vic Wertz	2	0.5	-

Key to colors
Elected to the Hall. These individuals are also indicated in **bold italics**.
Players who were elected in future elections. These individuals are also indicated in plain italics.
Players not yet elected who returned on the 1975 ballot.
Eliminated from future BBWAA voting. These individuals remain eligible for future Veterans Committee consideration.

The newly-eligible players included 9 All-Stars, 4 of whom were not included on the ballot, representing a total of 75 All-Star selections. Among the new candidates were 20-time All-Star Mickey Mantle, 12-time All-Stars Elston Howard and Eddie Mathews, 9-time All-Star Rocky Colavito, and 7-time All-Star Roger Maris.

Players eligible for the first time who were not included on the ballot were: John Buzhardt, Wayne Causey, Lenny Green, Larry Jackson, Stu Miller, Bill Monbouquette, Russ Nixon, Larry Sherry, Norm Siebern, Bobby Tiefenauer and John Tsitouris.

== J. G. Taylor Spink Award ==
Warren Brown (1894–1978), John Drebinger (1891–1979) and John Kieran (1892–1981) received the J. G. Taylor Spink Award honoring baseball writers. The awards were voted at the December 1973 meeting of the BBWAA, and included in the summer 1974 ceremonies.
