= Paul Hoynes =

American sportswriter

- Born: 1951 (age 74–75); Cleveland Heights, Ohio, U.S.
- Education: Marquette University (B.A.)
- Occupations: Sportswriter, author
- Spouse: Jackie
- Children: 2
- Writing career
- Notable awards: BBWAA Career Excellence Award (2026)

Paul Hoynes (born 1951) is an American sportswriter, and is the longtime beat reporter on the Cleveland Guardians for The Plain Dealer.

== Early life ==
Hoynes grew up in Cleveland Heights, Ohio. He graduated from Cathedral Latin High School and Marquette University, receiving a bachelor's degree in journalism.

== Career ==
Hoynes joined the Painesville Telegraph as a high school sports reporter in 1973. He covered the Cleveland Browns of the National Football League for the Cleveland Press and then joined The News-Herald covering the Cleveland Indians of Major League Baseball in 1983. The following year, Hoynes joined The Plain Dealer as their Indians beat writer.

During the 1990s, Hoynes covered the Indians teams that lost the 1995 World Series and 1997 World Series.

Hoynes served as the President of the Baseball Writers' Association of America (BBWAA) in 2007.

In September 2016, Hoynes was roundly criticized by fans and Indians players for writing a column declaring the team's postseason run "wouldn't last very long". The Indians eventually won the American League pennant and lost the World Series in seven games to the Chicago Cubs. He covered the team's 22-game winning streak between August 24 and September 15, 2017.

== Awards and honors ==
In December 2025, Hoynes was named the recipient of the BBWAA Career Excellence Award for the Baseball Hall of Fame Class of 2026. He formally accepted the award on July 25, 2026.

== Personal life ==
Hoynes and his wife, Jackie, have two sons. His grandfather, Bill Cook, is a member of the Hockey Hall of Fame.

In 2022, Hoynes was diagnosed with stomach cancer.
