= Allen Lewis (sportswriter) =

American sports writer (1916–2003)

Lewis

Field "Allen" Lewis (December 17, 1916 – September 14, 2003) was an American sports writer who covered the Philadelphia Phillies for close to half a century for The Philadelphia Inquirer.

== Biography ==
Born in Beechville, Pennsylvania in 1916, Lewis spent most of his childhood in North Carolina. Lewis graduated from Haverford College in 1940, where he played football and baseball. After college, Lewis joined the United States Army Air Forces (later, the US Air Force), and by the end of World War II, Lewis attained the rank of captain.

Lewis joined the Inquirer in 1946 and wrote almost exclusively about the Philadelphia Phillies until 1972. Lewis officially retired from the Inquirer in 1979. In 1981 he received the J. G. Taylor Spink Award, the highest honor awarded by the Baseball Writers' Association of America.

He served on the Veterans Committee of the National Baseball Hall of Fame and Museum from 1979 to 2000. In that capacity, Lewis joined a group of Hall-of-Famers who were charged with nominating and voting in new Hall of Fame inductees. He also was the Chairman of Major League Baseball's Scoring Committee from 1960 to 1974.

He was cited as "the foremost authority on baseball rules," and was respected as a baseball historian who covered 24 World Series and witnessed 10 no-hitters. Former Phillies' owner, Ruly Carpenter, praised Lewis as probably having as good a knowledge of baseball and how it was meant to be played as some field managers.

After retiring to Clearwater, Florida in the early 1980s, Lewis continued to follow the Phillies at their spring training camp in Clearwater, and was the first official scorer in 1998 for the Tampa Bay Devil Rays, until his final retirement in 2002.

During his time in Clearwater, Lewis joined with Dunedin Mayor Cecil Englebert, as they served on the Pinellas County Sports Authority. According to Englebert, "Lewis was very involved in the work we did in the (sports authority) to get the Dome (now Tropicana Field) built, and we traveled together to a lot of baseball meetings throughout the country. He introduced me to many baseball greats that I would never have had the opportunity to meet."

In addition to writing for the Inquirer, Lewis also published four books on the Phillies and baseball history:
