= 1993 Baseball Hall of Fame balloting =

Elections to the Baseball Hall of Fame

National Baseball

Hall of Fame and Museum
- New inductees: 1
- via BBWAA: 1
- Total inductees: 216
- Induction date: August 1, 1993

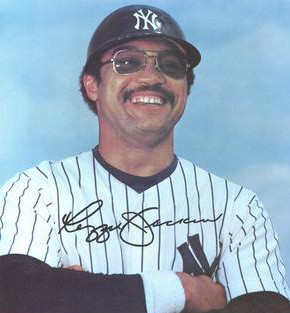
Reggie Jackson, sole 1993 inductee

Elections to the Baseball Hall of Fame for 1993 followed the system in place since 1978. The Baseball Writers' Association of America (BBWAA) voted by mail to select from recent major league players and elected Reggie Jackson. The Veterans Committee met in closed sessions to consider older major league players as well as managers, umpires, executives, and figures from the Negro leagues; it selected no one. A formal induction ceremony was held in Cooperstown, New York, on August 1, 1993.

== BBWAA election ==
The BBWAA was authorized to elect players active in 1973 or later, but not after 1987; the ballot included candidates from the 1992 ballot who received at least 5% of the vote but were not elected, along with selected players, chosen by a screening committee, whose last appearance was in 1987. All 10-year members of the BBWAA were eligible to vote.

Voters were instructed to cast votes for up to 10 candidates; any candidate receiving votes on at least 75% of the ballots would be honored with induction to the Hall. Results of the 1993 election by the BBWAA were announced on January 5. The ballot consisted of 32 players; a total of 423 ballots were cast, with 318 votes required for election. A total of 2,437 individual votes were cast, an average of 5.76 per ballot—a record low up to this point, and the first BBWAA election to average fewer than 6 names per ballot. Those candidates receiving less than 5% of the vote will not appear on future BBWAA ballots, but may eventually be considered by the Veterans Committee.

Candidates who were eligible for the first time are indicated here with a dagger (†). The one candidate who received at least 75% of the vote and was elected is indicated in bold italics; candidates who have since been elected in subsequent elections are indicated in italics. The 11 candidates who received less than 5% of the vote, thus becoming ineligible for future BBWAA consideration, are indicated with an asterisk (*).

Player	Votes	Percent	Change	Year
**Reggie Jackson**†	396	93.6	-	1st
Phil Niekro†	278	65.7	-	1st
Orlando Cepeda	252	59.6	▲2.4%	14th
Tony Pérez	233	55.1	▲5.1%	2nd
Steve Garvey†	176	41.6	-	1st
Tony Oliva	157	37.1	▼3.6%	12th
Ron Santo	155	36.6	▲5.0%	10th
Jim Kaat	125	29.6	▲3.1%	5th
Dick Allen	70	16.5	▲0.5%	11th
Ken Boyer	69	16.3	▼0.2%	14th
Minnie Miñoso	67	15.8	▼0.2%	9th
Joe Torre	63	14.9	▲0.5%	11th
Luis Tiant	62	14.7	▲3.1%	6th
Bobby Bonds	45	10.6	▲1.3%	7th
Mickey Lolich	43	10.2	▼0.3%	9th
Thurman Munson	40	9.5	▲2.1%	13th
Vada Pinson	38	9.0	▲0.6%	12th
Vida Blue	37	8.7	▲3.4%	2nd
Curt Flood	36	8.5	▼1.3%	12th
Rusty Staub	32	7.6	▲1.6%	3rd
George Foster	29	6.9	▲1.3%	2nd
Bill Madlock†*	19	4.5	-	1st
Ron Cey†*	8	1.9	-	1st
Doug DeCinces†*	2	0.5	-	1st
Davey Lopes†*	2	0.5	-	1st
Andre Thornton†*	2	0.5	-	1st
Bill Campbell†*	1	0.2	-	1st
Rick Burleson†*	0	0.0	-	1st
Cecil Cooper†*	0	0.0	-	1st
Gary Matthews†*	0	0.0	-	1st
Hal McRae†*	0	0.0	-	1st
Darrell Porter†*	0	0.0	-	1st

Key to colors
Elected to the Hall. These individuals are also indicated in **bold italics**.
Players who were elected in future elections. These individuals are also indicated in plain italics.
Players not yet elected who returned on the 1994 ballot.
Eliminated from future BBWAA voting. These individuals remain eligible for future Veterans Committee consideration.

The newly-eligible players included 27 All-Stars, twelve of whom were not included on the ballot, representing a total of 78 All-Star selections. Among the new candidates were 14-time All-Star Reggie Jackson, 10-time All-Star Steve Garvey, 6-time All-Star Ron Cey and 5-time All-Star Cecil Cooper. The field included two MVPs (Jackson and Garvey) and one Rookie of the Year (Gary Matthews).

Players eligible for the first time who were not included on the ballot were: Len Barker, Dale Berra, Ray Burris, Dan Driessen, Mike Easler, Jamie Easterly, Mike Fischlin, George Frazier, Johnny Grubb, Moose Haas, Al Holland, Tom Hume, Clint Hurdle, Ruppert Jones, Lee Lacy, Ken Landreaux, Gary Lavelle, Johnnie LeMaster, Aurelio Lopez, Rick Manning, Charlie Moore, Jorge Orta, Tom Paciorek, Lenn Sakata, Joe Sambito, Bob Shirley, Roy Smalley, Sammy Stewart, U L Washington, and Rob Wilfong.

== J. G. Taylor Spink Award ==
Leonard Koppett (1923–2003) and Bus Saidt (1920–1989) received the J. G. Taylor Spink Award honoring baseball writers. The awards were voted at the December 1992 meeting of the BBWAA, and included in the summer 1993 ceremonies.
