= 1997 Baseball Hall of Fame balloting =

Elections to the Baseball Hall of Fame

National Baseball

Hall of Fame and Museum
- New inductees: 4
- via BBWAA: 1
- via Veterans Committee: 3
- Total inductees: 232
- Induction date: August 3, 1997

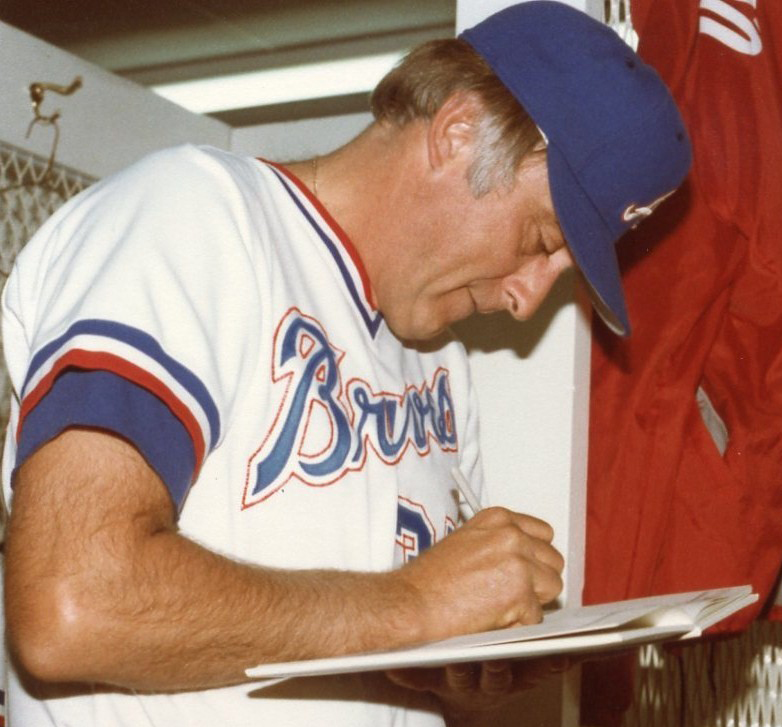
1997 BBWAA inductee Phil Niekro

Elections to the Baseball Hall of Fame for 1997 followed the system in use since 1995. The Baseball Writers' Association of America (BBWAA) voted by mail to select from recent major league players and elected Phil Niekro. The Veterans Committee met in closed sessions and selected three people from multiple classified ballots: Nellie Fox, Tommy Lasorda, and Willie Wells. A formal induction ceremony was held in Cooperstown, New York, on August 3, 1997.

== BBWAA election ==
The BBWAA was authorized to elect players active in 1977 or later, but not after 1991; the ballot included candidates from the 1996 ballot who received at least 5% of the vote but were not elected, along with selected players, chosen by a screening committee, whose last appearance was in 1991. All 10-year members of the BBWAA were eligible to vote.

Voters were instructed to cast votes for up to 10 candidates; any candidate receiving votes on at least 75% of the ballots would be honored with induction to the Hall. The ballot consisted of 30 players; 473 ballots were cast, with 353 votes required for election. A total of 2,515 individual votes were cast, an average of 5.32 per ballot—breaking the record low of 5.72 votes per ballot set the previous election (the election of 2012 would break 1997's record, with an average of 5.1 names per ballot). Those candidates receiving less than 5% of the vote (24 votes) will not appear on future BBWAA ballots, but may eventually be considered by the Veterans Committee.

Candidates who were eligible for the first time are indicated here with a dagger (†). The one candidate who received at least 75% of the vote and was elected is indicated in bold italics; candidates who have since been selected in subsequent elections are indicated in italics. The ten candidates who received less than 5% of the vote, thus becoming ineligible for future BBWAA consideration, are indicated with an asterisk (*).

Dick Allen and Joe Torre were on the ballot for the 15th and final time.

Player	Votes	Percent	Change	Year
**Phil Niekro**	**380**	**80.3**	▲12.0%	5th
Don Sutton	346	73.2	▲9.4%	4th
Tony Pérez	312	66.0	▲0.3%	6th
Ron Santo	186	39.3	▲2.3%	14th
Jim Rice	178	37.6	▲2.3%	3rd
Steve Garvey	167	35.3	▼1.9%	5th
Bruce Sutter	130	27.5	▼1.6%	4th
Jim Kaat	107	22.6	▲3.2%	9th
Joe Torre	105	22.2	▲11.6%	15th
Tommy John	97	20.5	▼1.2%	3rd
Minnie Miñoso	84	17.8	▲4.6%	13th
Dave Parker†	83	17.5	-	1st
Dick Allen	79	16.7	▼2.2%	15th
Dave Concepción	60	12.7	▼0.7%	4th
Luis Tiant	53	11.2	▼2.4%	10th
Keith Hernandez	45	9.5	▲4.4%	2nd
Mickey Lolich	34	7.2	▲0.2%	13th
Ron Guidry	31	6.6	▼1.3%	4th
Bob Boone	28	5.9	▼1.8%	2nd
Dwight Evans†	28	5.9	-	1st
Ken Griffey†*	22	4.7	-	1st
Fred Lynn*	22	4.7	▼0.8%	2nd
Graig Nettles*	22	4.7	▼3.2%	4th
Bobby Bonds*	20	4.2	▼0.9%	11th
Rusty Staub*	18	3.8	▼1.3%	7th
Rick Reuschel†*	2	0.4	-	1st
Mike Scott†*	2	0.4	-	1st
Garry Templeton†*	2	0.4	-	1st
Terry Kennedy†*	1	0.2	-	1st
Terry Puhl†*	1	0.2	-	1st

Key to colors
Elected to the Hall. These individuals are also indicated in **bold italics**.
Players who were elected in future elections. These individuals are also indicated in plain italics.
Players not yet elected who returned on the 1998 ballot.
Eliminated from future BBWAA voting. These individuals remain eligible for future Veterans Committee consideration.

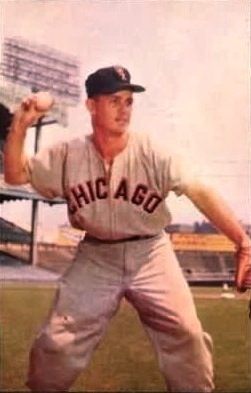
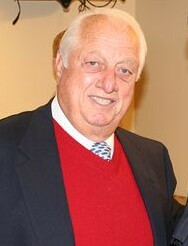
1995 Veterans Committee inductees Nellie Fox (left) and Tommy Lasorda. Willie Wells was also inducted.

The newly-eligible candidates included 20 All-Stars, including twelve who were not on the ballot, representing a total of 39 All-Star selections. The only candidate elected to at least five All-Star Games was Dave Parker, who was selected a total of seven times. Parker was also the only MVP, winning the award once. The field also included one Cy Young Award-winner (Mike Scott) and one Rookie of the Year (Ron Kittle).

Players eligible for the first time who were not included on the ballot were: Marty Barrett, Tony Bernazard, Oil Can Boyd, Greg Brock, Carmen Castillo, Jim Clancy, Steve Crawford, Warren Cromartie, Scott Garrelts, Ron Hassey, Andy Hawkins, Mike Heath, Danny Heep, Tom Herr, Ron Kittle, Mike LaCoss, Dave LaPoint, Vance Law, Rick Mahler, Mike Marshall, Andy McGaffigan, Lloyd Moseby, Pascual Pérez, Dan Petry, Dan Schatzeder, John Shelby, Eric Show, Max Venable, Ed Whitson, Ernie Whitt, and Mookie Wilson.

== Veterans Committee ==
The Veterans Committee met in closed sessions to elect as many as two executives, managers, umpires, and older major league players—the categories considered in all its meetings since 1953. By an arrangement since 1995 it separately considered candidates from the Negro leagues and from the 19th century with authority to select one from each of those two special ballots.

The committee elected three people, one fewer than permitted: second baseman Nellie Fox from the 1950s, manager Tommy Lasorda from the 1970s, and shortstop Willie Wells from the Negro leagues.

== J. G. Taylor Spink Award ==
Charley Feeney received the J. G. Taylor Spink Award honoring a baseball writer. (The award was voted at the December 1996 meeting of the BBWAA, dated 1996, and conferred in the summer 1997 ceremonies.)

== Ford C. Frick Award ==
Jimmy Dudley received the Ford C. Frick Award honoring a baseball broadcaster.
