= Jayson Stark =

American sportswriter (born 1951)

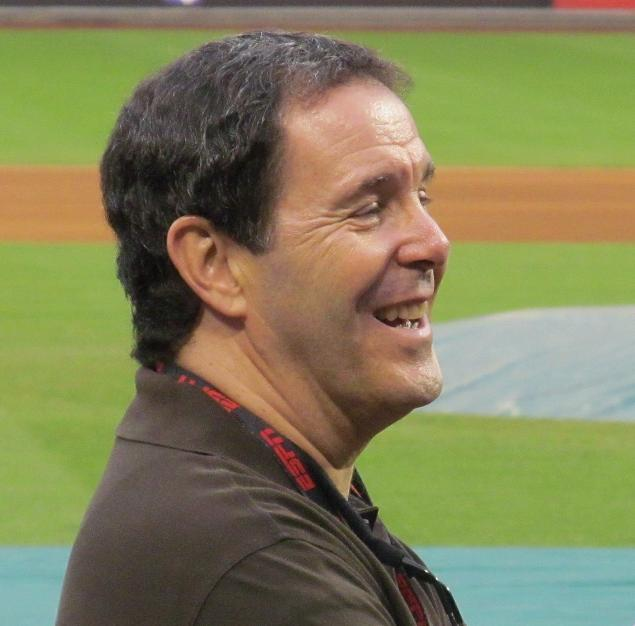
- Stark in 2012
- Born: July 19, 1951 (age 75); Philadelphia, Pennsylvania, U.S.
- Education: Syracuse University
- Occupations: Baseball writer and analyst
- Employers: The Philadelphia Inquirer (1979–2000); ESPN.com (2000–2017); The Athletic (2018–present)
- Spouse: Lisa
- Children: 3
- Awards: J. G. Taylor Spink Award (2019)
- Website: Jayson Stark

Jayson Stark (born July 19, 1951) is an American sportswriter and author who covers baseball for The Athletic. He is most known for his time with The Philadelphia Inquirer and ESPN.

== Biography ==
Stark was born in Philadelphia and grew up in the city's Northeast section. He graduated from Syracuse University's S. I. Newhouse School of Public Communications with a degree in journalism in 1973. His first job in journalism was at The Providence Journal. In 1979, he joined his hometown Philadelphia Inquirer as a beat writer for the Philadelphia Phillies, and eventually became a national baseball writer and columnist for that paper. From 1983 to 1999 he produced a nationally syndicated Baseball Week in Review column "known for unearthing obscure, historic and humorous aspects of baseball". He was twice named Pennsylvania Sportswriter of the Year by the National Sportscasters and Sportswriters Association. His observations and analysis of the 1993 Phillies team is quoted in several books.

Stark joined ESPN in 2000. He was a senior writer for ESPN.com. He also contributed to SportsCenter, ESPNews, Baseball Tonight, and a weekly segment during baseball season with WHB 810 in Kansas City. He appeared weekly on Mike & Mike. Beginning in 2014, Stark began co-hosting a weekly radio show during baseball season on ESPN Radio's affiliate in Philadelphia. Stark was inducted into the Philadelphia Jewish Sports Hall of Fame in 2017. Stark was laid off from ESPN on April 26, 2017, along with several other on-air personalities. On April 1, 2018, he started writing for The Athletic.

Stark is the 2019 recipient of the J. G. Taylor Spink Award given by the Baseball Writers' Association of America, for "meritorious contributions to baseball writing".

== Personal life ==
Stark has three children with his wife, Lisa, who has been an assistant coach for the Council Rock North volleyball team.

== Bibliography ==
=== Books ===
- Wild Pitches: Rumblings, Grumblings, and Reflections on the Game I Love. Triumph Books. 2014. ISBN 978-1623688165.
- Worth The Wait: Tales of the 2008 Phillies. Triumph Books. 2011. ISBN 978-1600786556.
- The Stark Truth: The Most Overrated and Underrated Players in Baseball History. Triumph Books. 2007. ISBN 978-1572439597.

=== Selected articles ===
- "How MLB Expansion could lead to realignment, a new playoff format, a universal DH and more". The Athletic. June 13, 2018.
- "Kolten Wong's walk-off wins wild one". ESPN. October 13, 2014.
- "Strange stuff … in the 2011 postseason". ESPN. December 23, 2011.
- "Strange But True in 2010". ESPN. December 24, 2010.
- "Schmidt Just Made It Look Easy", in The Phillies Reader, Richard Orodenker, ed. 2005: Temple University Press, page 220. ISBN 1592133983.
