= 1996 Baseball Hall of Fame balloting =

Elections to the Baseball Hall of Fame

National Baseball

Hall of Fame and Museum
- New inductees: 4
- via Veterans Committee: 4
- Total inductees: 228
- Induction date: August 4, 1996

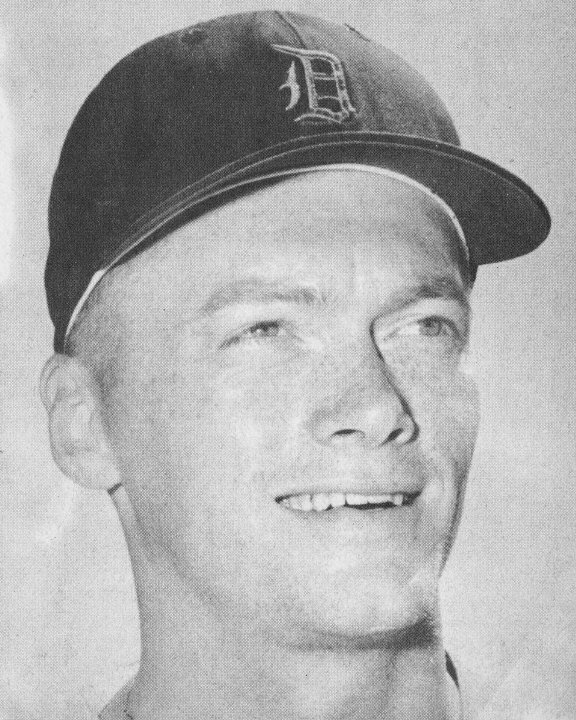
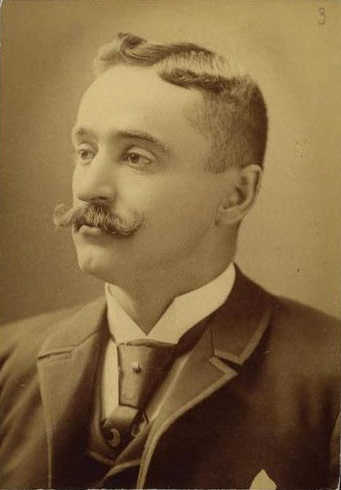
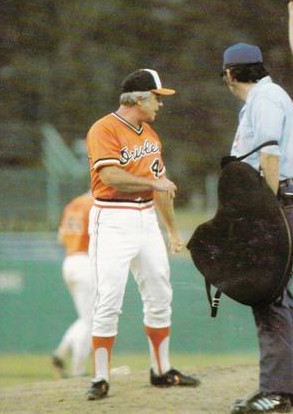
1996 inductees (L-R): Jim Bunning, Ned Hanlon, and Earl Weaver. Bill Foster was also inducted.

Elections to the Baseball Hall of Fame for 1996 followed the system in use since 1995. The Baseball Writers' Association of America (BBWAA) voted by mail to select from recent major league players but no one tallied the necessary 75% support.

The BBWAA had petitioned the Hall of Fame Board of Directors on January 5, 1995, to reconsider the eligibility of Larry Bowa, Bill Madlock, Al Oliver and Ted Simmons, each of whom had failed to receive at least 5% of ballots cast in each of their first years of eligibility (Bowa and Oliver in 1991, Madlock in 1993, and Simmons in 1994). The board of directors approved, but before the ballot was released, the BBWAA decided not to include them on the ballot after all.

The Veterans Committee met in closed sessions and selected four people from multiple classified ballots: Jim Bunning, Bill Foster, Ned Hanlon, and Earl Weaver. A formal induction ceremony was held in Cooperstown, New York, on August 4, 1996.

== BBWAA election ==
The BBWAA was authorized to elect players active in 1976 or later, but not after 1990; the ballot included candidates from the 1995 ballot who received at least 5% of the vote but were not elected, along with selected players, chosen by a screening committee, whose last appearance was in 1990. All 10-year members of the BBWAA were eligible to vote.

Voters were instructed to cast votes for up to 10 candidates; any candidate receiving votes on at least 75% of the ballots would be honored with induction to the Hall. The ballot consisted of 35 players; 470 ballots were cast, with 353 votes required for election. A total of 2,687 individual votes were cast, an average of 5.72 per ballot. Those candidates receiving less than 5% of the vote (24 votes) will not appear on future BBWAA ballots, but may eventually be considered by the Veterans Committee.

Candidates who were eligible for the first time are indicated here with a dagger (†). Candidates who have since been selected in subsequent elections are indicated in italics. The ten candidates who received less than 5% of the vote, thus becoming ineligible for future BBWAA consideration, are indicated with an asterisk (*).

Vada Pinson, Curt Flood, and Tony Oliva were all on the ballot for the 15th and final time.

Player	Votes	Percent	Change	Year
Phil Niekro	321	68.3	▲6.1%	4th
Tony Pérez	309	65.7	▲9.4%	5th
Don Sutton	300	63.8	▲6.4%	3rd
Steve Garvey	175	37.2	▼5.4%	4th
Ron Santo	174	37.0	▲6.8%	13th
Tony Oliva	170	36.2	▲3.8%	15th
Jim Rice	166	35.3	▲5.5%	2nd
Bruce Sutter	137	29.1	▼0.7%	3rd
Tommy John	102	21.7	▲0.4%	2nd
Jim Kaat	91	19.4	▼2.3%	8th
Dick Allen	89	18.9	▲3.2%	14th
Curt Flood	71	15.1	▲2.3%	15th
Luis Tiant	64	13.6	▲3.8%	9th
Dave Concepción	63	13.4	▲4.1%	3rd
Minnie Miñoso	62	13.2	▼1.1%	12th
Vada Pinson	51	10.9	▲3.9%	15th
Joe Torre	50	10.6	▼0.3%	14th
Ron Guidry	37	7.9	▲2.5%	3rd
Graig Nettles	37	7.9	▲1.8%	3rd
Bob Boone†	36	7.7	-	1st
Mickey Lolich	33	7.0	▲1.3%	12th
Fred Lynn†	26	5.5	-	1st
Bobby Bonds	24	5.1	▼2.5%	10th
Keith Hernandez†	24	5.1	-	1st
Rusty Staub	24	5.1	▲0.1%	6th
Dan Quisenberry†*	18	3.8	-	1st
Frank White†*	18	3.8	-	1st
Bill Buckner†*	10	2.1	-	1st
Jerry Reuss†*	2	0.4	-	1st
John Tudor†*	2	0.4	-	1st
Chet Lemon†*	1	0.2	-	1st
Bob Knepper†*	0	0.0	-	1st
Jeffrey Leonard†*	0	0.0	-	1st
Johnny Ray†*	0	0.0	-	1st
Claudell Washington†*	0	0.0	-	1st

Key to colors
Players who were elected in future elections. These individuals are also indicated in plain italics.
Players not yet elected who returned on the 1997 ballot.
Eliminated from future BBWAA voting. These individuals remain eligible for future Veterans Committee consideration.

The newly eligible players included 20 All-Stars, eight of whom were not included on the ballot, representing a total of 51 All-Star selections. Among the new candidates were 9-time All-Star Fred Lynn and 5-time All-Star Keith Hernandez. The field included two MVPs, Hernandez and Lynn, who was the first player ever to win an MVP in the same year as winning Rookie of the Year.

Players eligible for the first time who were not included on the ballot were: Don Aase, Doug Bair, Thad Bosley, Tom Brookens, Ernie Camacho, Mark Clear, Dave Collins, Jody Davis, Richard Dotson, Jim Dwyer, Terry Francona, Mickey Hatcher, Rick Leach, Larry McWilliams, Greg Minton, Paul Mirabella, Tom Niedenfuer, Dickie Noles, Mike Norris, Ron Oester, Ken Phelps, Joe Price, Domingo Ramos, Ed Romero, Wayne Tolleson, Alex Treviño, Ozzie Virgil, Jr., and Gary Ward.

== Veterans Committee ==
The Veterans Committee met in closed sessions to elect as many as two executives, managers, umpires, and older major league players—the categories considered in all its meetings since 1953. By an arrangement since 1995 it separately considered candidates from the Negro leagues and from the 19th century with authority to select one from each of those two special ballots.

The committee elected four people again, the maximum number permitted: pitcher Jim Bunning from the 1960s, manager Earl Weaver from the 1970s, pitcher Bill Foster from the Negro leagues, and manager Ned Hanlon from the 19th century.

== J. G. Taylor Spink Award ==
Joe Durso received the J. G. Taylor Spink Award honoring a baseball writer. (The award was voted at the December 1995 meeting of the BBWAA, dated 1995, and included in the summer 1996 ceremonies.)

== Ford C. Frick Award ==
Herb Carneal received the Ford C. Frick Award honoring a baseball broadcaster.
