= Jack Lang (sportswriter) =

American journalist

Lang

Jack Lang (May 11, 1921 – January 25, 2007) was an American sportswriter who spent more than forty years covering New York's baseball teams.

== Newspaper career ==
Lang began his journalistic career covering the Brooklyn Dodgers for the Long Island Press in 1947. After the Dodgers moved to Los Angeles for the 1958 season, the paper assigned him to cover the New York Yankees. He also began covering the New York Mets in their inaugural 1962 season and continued on the beat until his retirement in 1989.

When the Long Island Press folded in March 1977, Lang moved to the New York Daily News.

He was the 1986 recipient of the J. G. Taylor Spink Award, presented by the Baseball Writers' Association of America for meritorious contributions to baseball writing.

== Other activities ==
Lang also served as an executive officer of the Baseball Writers' Association of America (BBWAA) and was responsible for overseeing the voting process for election to the Baseball Hall of Fame from 1967 through 1994.

He was also a member of Major League Baseball's scoring rules committee.
