= Platinum Pen Award =

Annual award for baseball writers

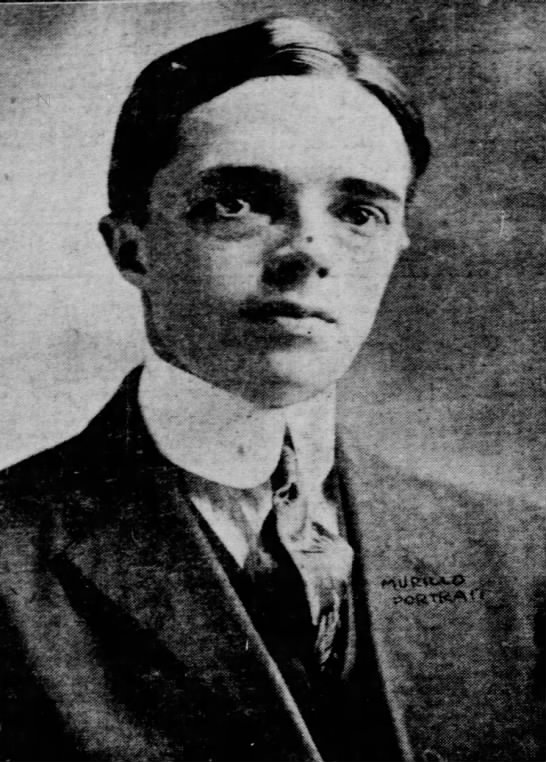
- J. G. Taylor Spink, the award's first recipient and former namesake
- Sport: Baseball
- Awarded for: "Meritorious contributions to baseball writing"
- Location: National Baseball Hall of Fame; Cooperstown, New York
- Presented by: Baseball Writers' Association of America (BBWAA)

History
- First award: 1962
- First winner: J. G. Taylor Spink
- Most recent: Paul Hoynes (2026)
- Website: Official website

The Platinum Pen Award, formerly known as the J. G. Taylor Spink Award (1962–2021) and the BBWAA Career Excellence Award (2021–2026), is the highest award given by the Baseball Writers' Association of America (BBWAA). It is given "for meritorious contributions to baseball writing" and voted on annually by the BBWAA. Winners are typically announced in December, with the award presented at the Baseball Hall of Fame in July.

Recipients of the award are not members of the Hall of Fame—they are not "inducted" or "enshrined", they are not "Hall of Fame sportswriters", and there is no "writers' wing" of the Hall of Fame—they are officially "honorees." The award is given at a separate ceremony from the induction ceremony on Hall of Fame weekend. As with recipients of the Ford C. Frick Award for baseball broadcasting, the honorees are permanently recognized in a "Scribes & Mikemen" exhibit in the Hall's library.

The award was instituted in 1962 and named after J. G. Taylor Spink, publisher of The Sporting News from 1914 to 1962, and the award's first recipient. In February 2021, the BBWAA voted to remove his name from the award "due to Spink’s troubled history in supporting segregated baseball."

== Eligibility ==
The honoree does not have to be a member of the Baseball Writers' Association of America (BBWAA), but every recipient from the award's 1962 inception through 2013 had been a BBWAA member at some time. The first recipient who had never been a BBWAA member was 2014 recipient Roger Angell. Despite having written on baseball for more than a half-century, Angell never worked a specific baseball writing beat, thereby making him ineligible for BBWAA membership.

== Naming ==
Shortly before Spink's death in 1962, the BBWAA created the award and named him its first recipient. Due to his history of supporting segregation in baseball, the Association voted 325–9 to remove Spink's name from the award in February 2021, and it was subsequently known as the BBWAA Career Excellence Award. In 2025, the award was re-christened the Platinum Pen Award.

== Veterans Committee role ==
For several years in the early 2000s, honorees became life members of the Veterans Committee, which elects players whose eligibility for BBWAA consideration has ended, and is also the sole body that elects non-players for induction into the Hall. Starting with elections for induction in 2008, voting on the main Veterans Committee, which then selected only players whose careers began in 1943 or later, was restricted to Hall of Fame members. After further changes announced for the 2011 and 2017 elections, BBWAA Career Excellence Award winners are eligible to serve on all of the era-based voting bodies that succeeded the Veterans Committee (and are still colloquially referred to as such).

== Recipients ==
Through 2006, the BBWAA designated honorees based on the announcement year (typically in December). In the below table, winners through 2006 are listed with both their announcement year, and their induction ceremony year (the ensuing summer). In 2007, the BBWAA changed the year designation for the award to coincide with the induction ceremony. Thus, while the official BBWAA year designations jump from 2006 to 2008, the award has been bestowed annually since inception, except for one year missed due to the 1994–95 Major League Baseball strike.

From 1972 through 1981, there were multiple honorees each year. This again occurred in 1988 and 1992. Since that time, there has been a single winner each year.

Through 2010, the award was presented during the actual induction ceremony; since then, it has been presented at the Hall of Fame awards presentation, held the day before the induction ceremony. In recent years, the Hall of Fame has announced the finalists for the award and final vote totals. Previously, such detail was not made public, with only the winner announced.

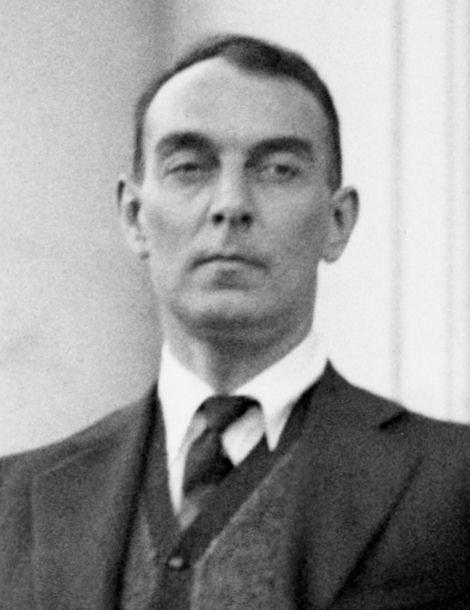
1963 recipient Ring Lardner

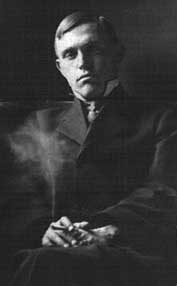
1967 recipient Damon Runyon

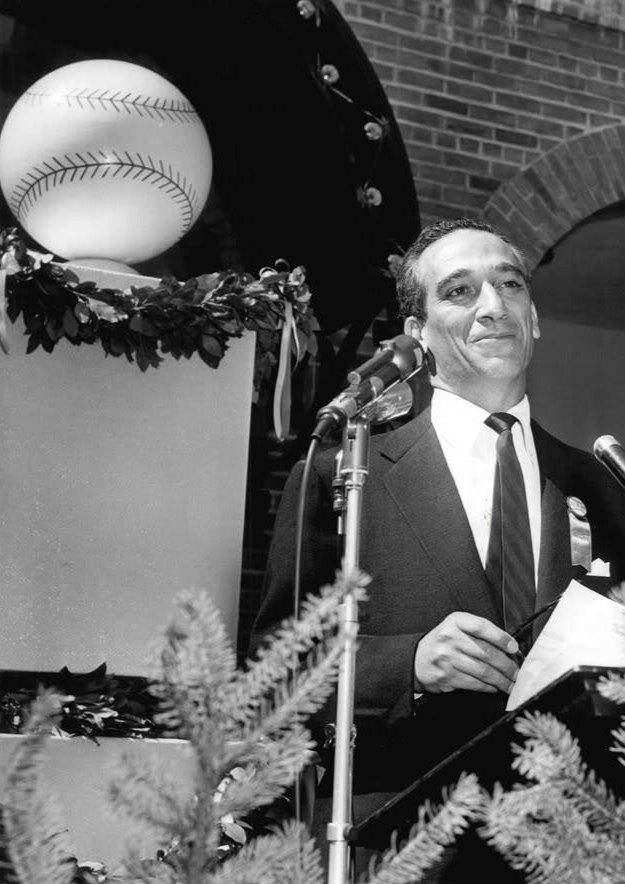
1975 recipient Shirley Povich

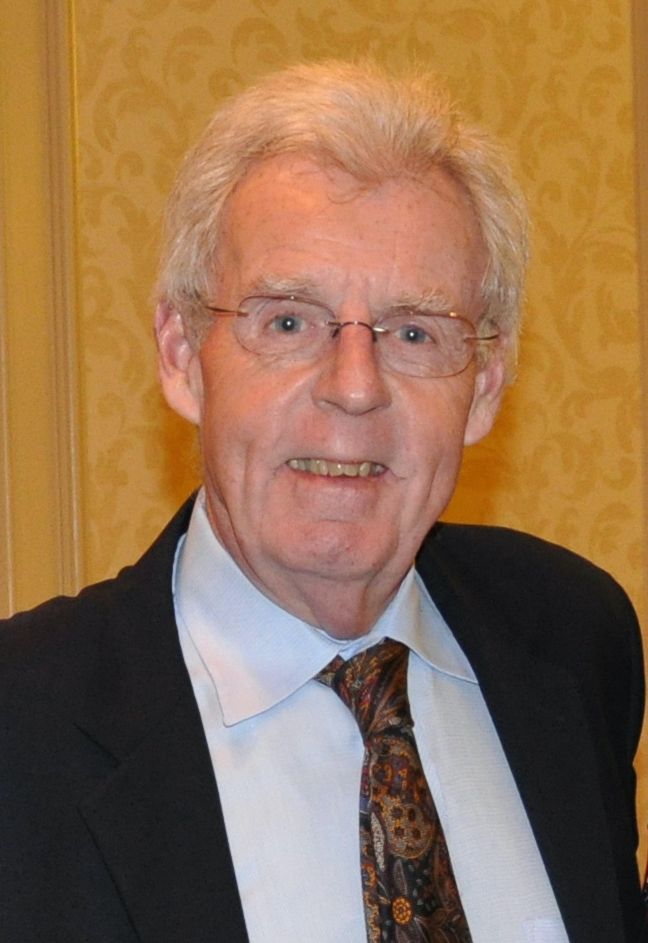
2004 recipient Peter Gammons

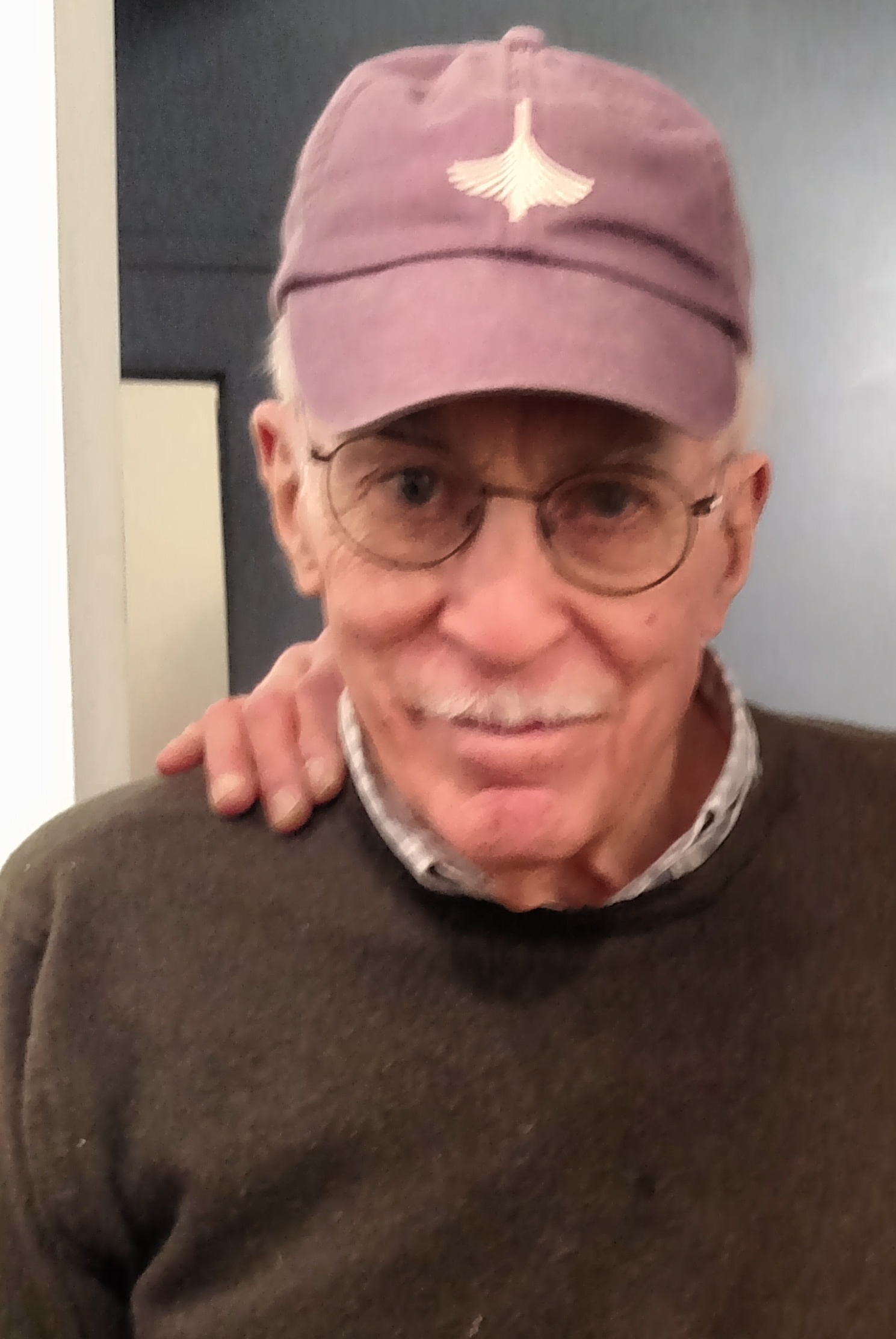
2014 recipient Roger Angell

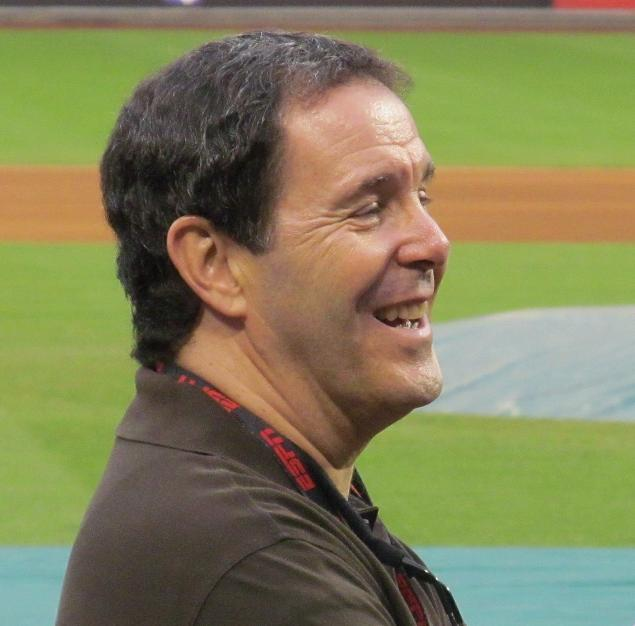
2019 recipient Jayson Stark

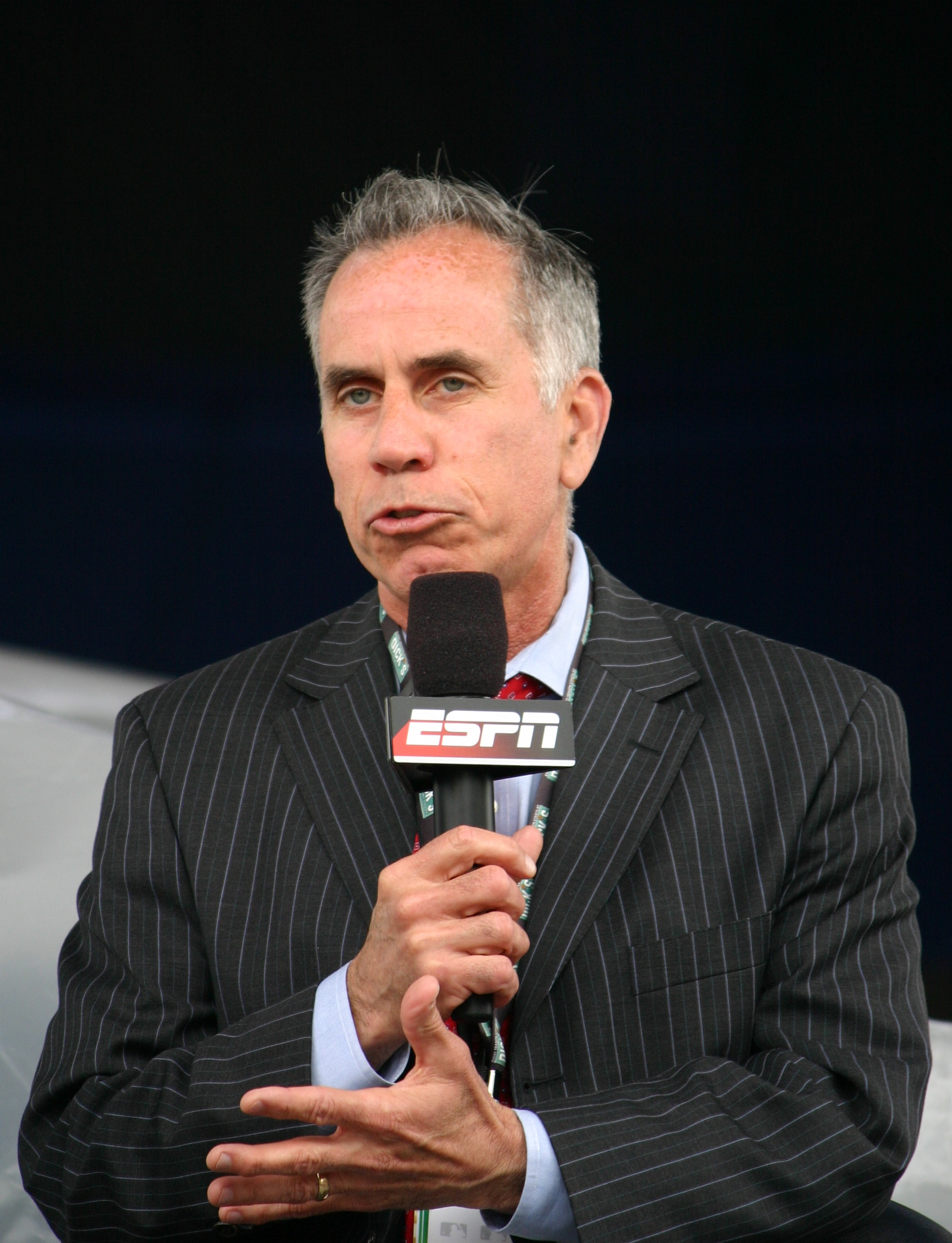
2022 recipient Tim Kurkjian

Year	Honoree			Beat	Ref.
Year	Name	Born	Died	Beat	Ref.
1962 (1963)	J. G. Taylor Spink	1888	1962	St. Louis	
1963 (1964)	Ring Lardner	1885	1933	Chicago	
1964 (1965)	Hugh Fullerton	1873	1945	Chicago	
1965 (1966)	Charles Dryden	1860	1931	Chicago	
1966 (1967)	Grantland Rice	1880	1954	New York City	
1967 (1968)	Damon Runyon	1880	1946	New York City	
1968 (1969)	H. G. Salsinger	1885	1958	Detroit	
1969 (1970)	Sid Mercer	1880	1945	New York City	
1970 (1971)	Heywood Broun	1888	1939	New York City	
1971 (1972)	Frank Graham	1893	1965	New York City	
1972 (1973)	Dan Daniel	1890	1981	New York City	
1972 (1973)	Fred Lieb	1888	1980	New York City	
1972 (1973)	J. Roy Stockton	1892	1972	St. Louis	
1973 (1974)	Warren Brown	1894	1978	Chicago	
1973 (1974)	John Drebinger	1891	1979	New York City	
1973 (1974)	John Kieran	1892	1981	New York City	
1974 (1975)	John Carmichael	1902	1986	Chicago	
1974 (1975)	James Isaminger	1880	1946	Philadelphia	
1975 (1976)	Tom Meany	1903	1964	New York City	
1975 (1976)	Shirley Povich	1905	1998	Washington, D.C.	
1976 (1977)	Harold Kaese	1909	1975	Boston	
1976 (1977)	Red Smith	1905	1982	New York City	
1977 (1978)	Gordon Cobbledick	1898	1969	Cleveland	
1977 (1978)	Edgar Munzel	1907	2002	Chicago	
1978 (1979)	Tim Murnane	1851	1917	Boston	
1978 (1979)	Dick Young	1917	1987	New York City	
1979 (1980)	Bob Broeg	1918	2005	St. Louis	
1979 (1980)	Tommy Holmes	1903	1975	New York City	
1980 (1981)	Joe Reichler	1915	1988	New York City	
1980 (1981)	Milton Richman	1922	1986	New York City	
1981 (1982)	Allen Lewis	1916	2003	Philadelphia	
1981 (1982)	Bob Addie	1910	1982	Washington, D.C.	
1982 (1983)	Si Burick	1909	1986	Dayton, Ohio	
1983 (1984)	Ken Smith	1902	1991	New York City	
1984 (1985)	Joe McGuff	1926	2006	Kansas City, Missouri	
1985 (1986)	Earl Lawson	1923	2003	Cincinnati	
1986 (1987)	Jack Lang	1921	2007	New York City	
1987 (1988)	Jim Murray	1919	1998	Los Angeles	
1988 (1989)	Bob Hunter	1913	1993	Los Angeles	
1988 (1989)	Ray Kelly	1914	1988	Philadelphia	
1989 (1990)	Jerome Holtzman	1926	2008	Chicago	
1990 (1991)	Phil Collier	1925	2001	San Diego	
1991 (1992)	Ritter Collett	1921	2001	Dayton, Ohio	
1992 (1993)	Leonard Koppett	1923	2003	New York City	
1992 (1993)	Bus Saidt	1920	1989	Philadelphia	
1993 (1994)	Wendell Smith	1914	1972	Pittsburgh	
1994 (1995)	(not presented)	—	—	—	
1995 (1996)	Joe Durso	1924	2004	New York City	
1996 (1997)	Charley Feeney	1924	2014	New York City	
1997 (1998)	Sam Lacy	1903	2003	Washington, D.C.	
1998 (1999)	Bob Stevens	1916	2002	San Francisco	
1999 (2000)	Hal Lebovitz	1916	2005	Cleveland	
2000 (2001)	Ross Newhan	1937	2026	Los Angeles	
2001 (2002)	Joe Falls	1928	2004	Detroit	
2002 (2003)	Hal McCoy	1940		Dayton, Ohio	
2003 (2004)	Murray Chass	1938		New York City	
2004 (2005)	Peter Gammons	1945		Boston	
2005 (2006)	Tracy Ringolsby	1951		Seattle, Kansas City, Dallas, Denver	
2006 (2007)	Rick Hummel	1946	2023	St. Louis	
2008	Larry Whiteside	1937	2007	Kansas City, Milwaukee, Boston	
2009	Nick Peters	1939	2015	San Francisco	
2010	Bill Madden	1946		New York City	
2011	Bill Conlin	1934	2014	Philadelphia	
2012	Bob Elliott	1949		Montreal / Toronto	
2013	Paul Hagen	1951		Dallas–Fort Worth / Philadelphia	
2014	Roger Angell	1920	2022	The New Yorker	
2015	Tom Gage	1948		Detroit	
2016	Dan Shaughnessy	1953		Baltimore, Boston	
2017	Claire Smith	1954		New York City	
2018	Sheldon Ocker	1942		Akron, Ohio	
2019	Jayson Stark	1951		Philadelphia	
2020	Nick Cafardo	1956	2019	Boston	
2021	Dick Kaegel	1939		St. Louis, Kansas City	
2022	Tim Kurkjian	1956		Dallas, Baltimore, Sports Illustrated, ESPN.com	
2023	John Lowe	c. 1959		Los Angeles, Philadelphia, Detroit	
2024	Gerry Fraley	1954	2019	Dallas, Atlanta, The Sporting News	
2025	Thomas Boswell	1947		Washington, D.C.	
2026	Paul Hoynes	1951		Cleveland	

== Notes ==
This award should not be confused with the Topps Minor League Player of the Year Award, which was also known as the "J. G. Taylor Spink Award".

== See also ==
- Honor Rolls of Baseball (writers section)
- Ford C. Frick Award, the National Baseball Hall of Fame's award for broadcasters
- Bill Nunn Memorial Award, bestowed annually by the Professional Football Writers of America
- Elmer Ferguson Memorial Award, bestowed annually by the Professional Hockey Writers' Association
- List of sports journalism awards
