= 1991 Baseball Hall of Fame balloting =

Elections to the Baseball Hall of Fame

National Baseball

Hall of Fame and Museum
- New inductees: 5
- via BBWAA: 3
- via Veterans Committee: 2
- Total inductees: 211
- Induction date: July 21, 1991

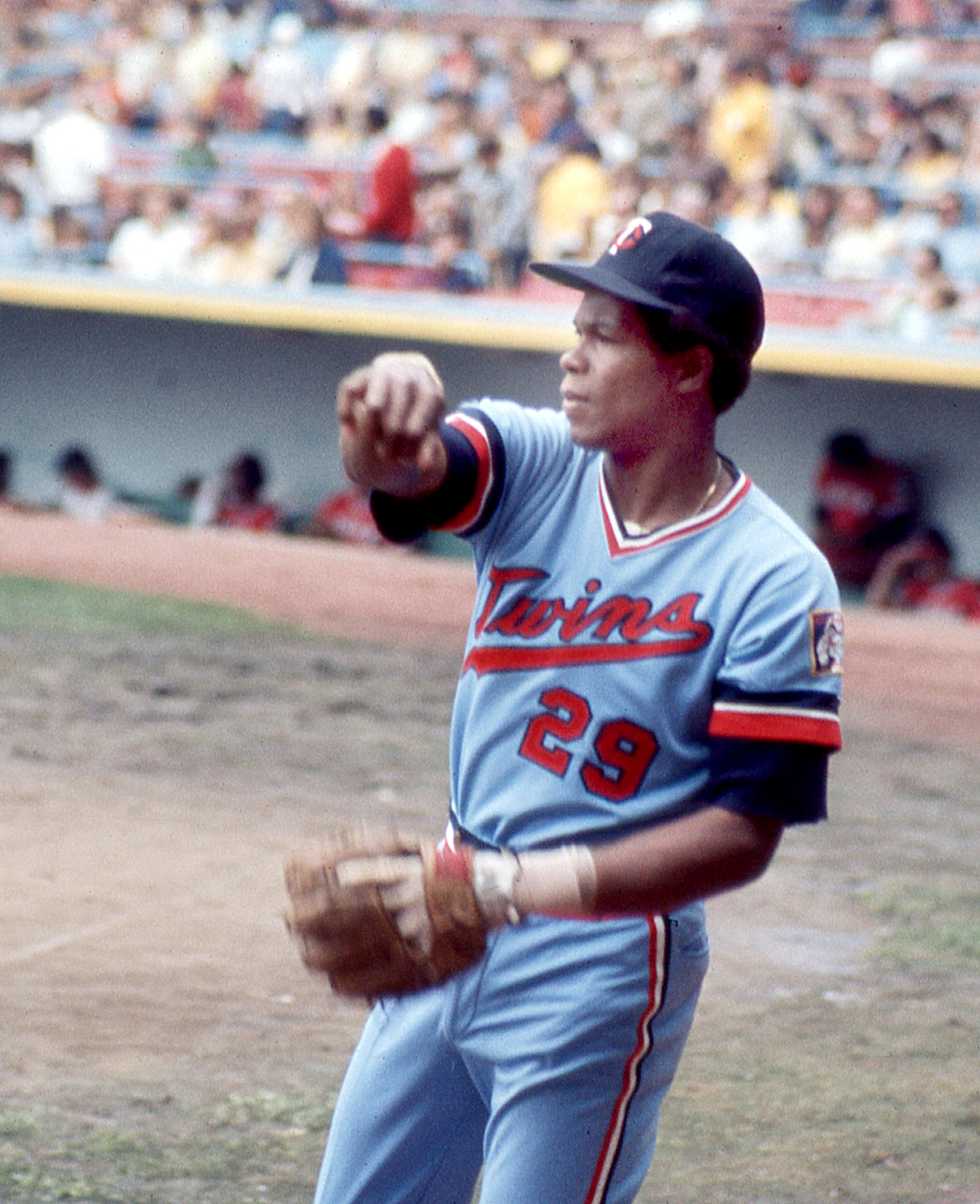
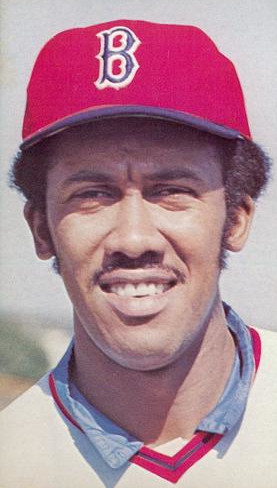
1991 BBWAA inductees (L-R): Rod Carew, Gaylord Perry, and Ferguson Jenkins

Elections to the Baseball Hall of Fame for 1991 followed the system in place since 1978. The Baseball Writers' Association of America (BBWAA) voted by mail to select from recent major league players and elected three, Rod Carew, Ferguson Jenkins, and Gaylord Perry. The Veterans Committee met in closed sessions to consider older major league players as well as managers, umpires, executives, and figures from the Negro leagues. It selected two, Tony Lazzeri and Bill Veeck. A formal induction ceremony was held in Cooperstown, New York, on July 21, 1991.

== BBWAA election ==
The BBWAA was authorized to elect players active in 1971 or later, but not after 1985; the ballot included candidates from the 1990 ballot who received at least 5% of the vote but were not elected, along with selected players, chosen by a screening committee, whose last appearance was in 1985. All 10-year members of the BBWAA were eligible to vote.

Voters were instructed to cast votes for up to 10 candidates; any candidate receiving votes on at least 75% of the ballots would be honored with induction to the Hall. The ballot consisted of 45 players; a total of 443 ballots were cast, with 333 votes required for election. A total of 2,948 individual votes were cast, an average of 6.65 per ballot. Those candidates receiving less than 5% of the vote will not appear on future BBWAA ballots, but may eventually be considered by the Veterans Committee.

Candidates who were eligible for the first time are indicated here with a dagger (†). The three candidates who received at least 75% of the vote and were elected are indicated in bold italics; candidates who have since been elected in subsequent elections are indicated in italics. The 22 candidates who received less than 5% of the vote, thus becoming ineligible for future BBWAA consideration, are indicated with an asterisk (*).

Jim Bunning and Harvey Kuenn were on the ballot for the 15th and final time.

Key to colors
Elected to the Hall. These individuals are also indicated in **bold italics**.
Players who were elected in future elections. These individuals are also indicated in plain italics.
Players not yet elected who returned on the 1992 ballot.
Eliminated from future BBWAA voting. These individuals remain eligible for future Veterans Committee consideration.

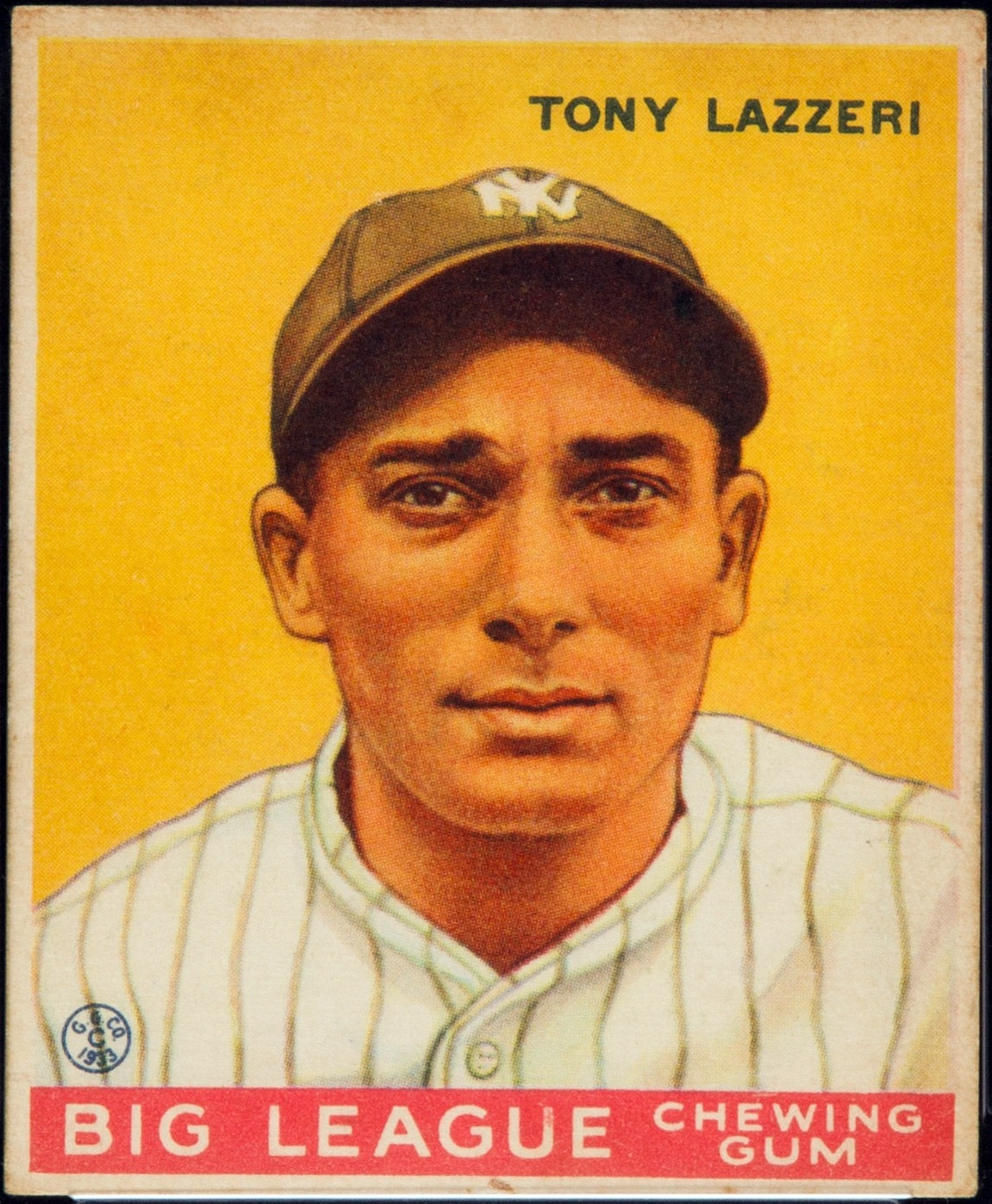
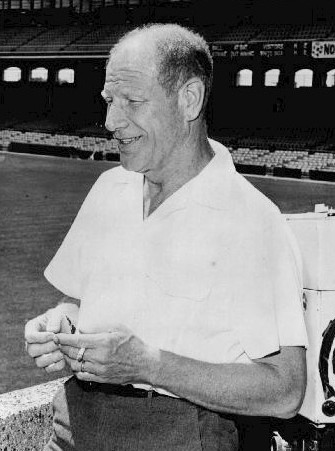
1991 Veterans Committee inductees Tony Lazzeri (left) and Bill Veeck

Player	Votes	Percent	Change	Year
**Rod Carew**†	**401**	**90.5**	-	1st
**Gaylord Perry**	**342**	**77.2**	▲5.1%	3rd
**Fergie Jenkins**	**334**	**75.4**	▲8.7%	3rd
Rollie Fingers†	291	65.7	-	1st
Jim Bunning	282	63.7	▲5.8%	15th
Orlando Cepeda	192	43.3	▼4.2%	12th
Tony Oliva	160	36.1	▲4.1%	10th
Bill Mazeroski	142	32.1	▲2.6%	14th
Ron Santo	116	26.2	▲4.6%	8th
Harvey Kuenn	100	22.6	▼1.5%	15th
Jim Kaat	62	14.0	▼3.8%	3rd
Maury Wills	61	13.8	▼7.6%	14th
Dick Allen	59	13.3	▲0.2%	9th
Ken Boyer	58	13.1	▼4.5%	12th
Joe Torre	41	9.3	▼3.1%	9th
Bobby Bonds	39	8.8	▼2.0%	5th
Minnie Miñoso	38	8.6	▼2.9%	7th
Mickey Lolich	33	7.4	▲1.3%	7th
Luis Tiant	32	7.2	▼2.3%	4th
Vada Pinson	30	6.8	▼1.3%	10th
Thurman Munson	28	6.3	▼1.1%	11th
Rusty Staub†	28	6.3	-	1st
Curt Flood	23	5.2	▲2.7%	10th
Al Oliver†*	19	4.3	-	1st
Sparky Lyle*	15	3.4	▼2.2%	4th
Larry Bowa†*	11	2.5	-	1st
Jerry Koosman†*	4	0.9	-	1st
Jeff Burroughs†*	1	0.2	-	1st
Mike Hargrove†*	1	0.2	-	1st
Richie Hebner†*	1	0.2	-	1st
Burt Hooton†*	1	0.2	-	1st
Mike Jorgensen†*	1	0.2	-	1st
John Lowenstein†*	1	0.2	-	1st
Ellis Valentine†*	1	0.2	-	1st
Bob Bailor†*	0	0.0	-	1st
Al Bumbry†*	0	0.0	-	1st
Rich Dauer†*	0	0.0	-	1st
Oscar Gamble†*	0	0.0	-	1st
Larry Gura†*	0	0.0	-	1st
Art Howe†*	0	0.0	-	1st
Bruce Kison†*	0	0.0	-	1st
Steve Rogers†*	0	0.0	-	1st
John Wathan†*	0	0.0	-	1st
Pat Zachry†*	0	0.0	-	1st
Geoff Zahn†*	0	0.0	-	1st

The field of newly-eligible players included 14 All-Stars, all of whom were on the ballot, representing a total of 58 All-Star selections. Among the new candidates were 18-time All-Star Rod Carew, 7-time All-Stars Rollie Fingers and Al Oliver, 6-time All-Star Rusty Staub, and 5-time All-Stars Larry Bowa and Steve Rogers. The field included four Rookies of the Year (Carew, Al Bumbry, Mike Hargrove and Pat Zachry), three MVPs (Carew, Fingers and Jeff Boroughs) and two Cy Young Award winners (Sparky Lyle and Rollie Fingers. Fingers also received the MVP Award the same year).

Players eligible for the first time who were not included on the ballot were: Benny Ayala, Alan Bannister, Kurt Bevacqua, Steve Braun, Miguel Diloné, Doug Flynn, Tim Foli, Dan Ford, Kiko Garcia, Ed Glynn, Andy Hassler, Jay Johnstone, Duane Kuiper, Sixto Lezcano, Dan Meyer, Rick Miller, Dale Murray, Joe Nolan, Dan Spillner, Mike Squires, Bill Stein, Derrel Thomas, Rick Waits, and John Wockenfuss.

== J. G. Taylor Spink Award ==
Phil Collier (1925–2001) received the J. G. Taylor Spink Award honoring a baseball writer. The award was voted at the December 1990 meeting of the BBWAA, and included in the summer 1991 ceremonies.
