= Bob Stevens (sportswriter) =

American sportswriter (1916–2002)

Stevens

Robert E. Stevens (October 10, 1916 – January 2, 2002) was an American sportswriter who wrote for the San Francisco Chronicle from 1935 to 1981, interrupted by service in the Navy during World War II. He was known for his coverage of the San Francisco Giants from the team's arrival in San Francisco in 1958 until 1978. Stevens also worked as an official scorer for baseball games during part of his tenure at the Chronicle, and again after he retired from the paper. In 1999 he was awarded the J. G. Taylor Spink Award by the Baseball Writers' Association of America for outstanding contributions to baseball writing. The press box at Oracle Park is named in his honor. He died at age 85 in San Bruno, California.
