= Harold Kaese =

American sportswriter

- Born: March 18, 1909; Philadelphia, Pennsylvania, U.S.
- Died: May 10, 1975 (aged 66); Boston, Massachusetts, U.S.
- Resting place: Puritan Lawn Memorial Park, Peabody, Massachusetts
- Education: Tufts College
- Occupation: Sportswriter
- Years active: 1933–1973
- Employer(s): Boston Evening Transcript (1933–1941); The Boston Globe (1941–1973)
- Known for: Coverage of the Boston Braves and Boston Red Sox
- Spouse: Alayne
- Awards: J. G. Taylor Spink Award (1976)

Harold William Kaese (March 8, 1909 – May 10, 1975) was an American sports writer, best known for covering Major League Baseball in Boston, Massachusetts.

== Biography ==
Kaese was born in 1909 in Philadelphia, grew up in Lynn, Massachusetts, and graduated from Lynn English High School where he excelled at basketball and baseball. He graduated magna cum laude from Tufts College in 1933, where he was a member of the Phi Kappa Phi fraternity. During the 1940s to 1960s, he won several squash championships at the state and national levels.

Kaese worked for the Boston Evening Transcript from 1933 to 1941, and then for The Boston Globe until 1973. He covered both the Boston Braves and the Boston Red Sox of Major League Baseball (MLB), retiring after the 1973 World Series. His writing was also published in various periodicals, including The Saturday Evening Post, The New York Times Magazine, and Sports Illustrated. He wrote a book on the history of Boston's National League team, entitled The Boston Braves, 1871–1953.

Kaese died at Massachusetts General Hospital in Boston on May 10, 1975; he had checked in to the hospital the day before, complaining of chest pains. He was survived by his wife. His funeral was attended by representatives of The Boston Globe, Boston Red Sox, Boston Bruins, and The Jimmy Fund; he was buried in Peabody, Massachusetts.

Kaese was honored (along with Red Smith) with the J. G. Taylor Spink Award by the Baseball Writers' Association of America (BBWAA) in December 1976.
