= H. G. Salsinger =

American sportswriter (1885–1958)

- Born: April 10, 1885; Springfield, Ohio, US
- Died: November 27, 1958 (aged 73); Detroit, Michigan, US
- Occupation: Sportswriter
- Employer: The Detroit News
- Spouse: Gladys
- Children: 1
- Awards: J. G. Taylor Spink Award (1968)

Harry George Salsinger (April 10, 1885 – November 27, 1958) was an American sportswriter who served as sports editor of The Detroit News for 49 years.

== Biography ==
Salsinger was born in Springfield, Ohio. In 1907, he started writing for The Cincinnati Post.

In 1909, Salsinger began working at The Detroit News as sports editor, a position he held until his death in 1958. He covered 50 World Series, two Olympic Games, and many other sports including football, golf, tennis, and boxing. Salsinger was also a president of both the Baseball Writers' Association of America (BBWAA), and the Football Writers Association of America. Salsinger retired in January 1958 and died 10 months later at Henry Ford Hospital following a long illness.

Salsinger was married to Gladys E. Salsinger. They had a son, Harry G. Salsinger Jr., born in October 1919.

In 1968, the BBWAA posthumously awarded Salsinger the J. G. Taylor Spink Award for his baseball writing. He was inducted into the Michigan Sports Hall of Fame in 2002.

== Selected works ==
- When 'Babe' Ruth Was Beaten by John McGraw, Baseball Magazine, November 1922 (reprinted in Literary Digest, December 2, 1922)
- The day Johnny Bassler stole home, 1923 (reprinted in Baseball Digest, October 1955)
- Cobb dominated baseball with his keen mind and a will to succeed, The Detroit News, November 2, 1924 (reprinted in "They Earned Their Stripes", pp. 33–37)
- Lustrous Lenglen (Suzanne Lenglen), The Dearborn Independent, February 5, 1927, p. 7
- Chilled Drama: Streaks on Ice (speed skating), The Dearborn Independent, February 1927, p. 7
- New Idols for the Gallery: The Slashing Game (ice hockey), The Dearborn Independent, February 26, 1927, p. 7
- Courage and Endurance -- Matters of Stomach Not of Heart, The Dearborn Independent, March 5, 1927, p. 12
- The Weiser Typhoon - Old Barney (Walter Johnson), The Dearborn Independent, April 9, 1927, p. 14
- The Gate God Ruth (Babe Ruth), The Dearborn Independent, April 23, 1927, p. 7
- He Made a Man's Game out of Tennis (Bill Tilden), The Dearborn Independent, May 29, 1927, p. 7
- The Weiser Typhoon - Old Barney (Walter Johnson), The Dearborn Independent, April 9, 1927, p. 14
- Playing for Community (on Hank Greenberg's decision to play on Rosh Hashanah), The Detroit News, September 11, 1934
- Rogell gets it going with defense (Billy Rogell), The Detroit News, September 11, 1935 (reprinted in "They Earned Their Stripes", pp. 114–115)
- Cochrane owned Detroit in 1935 (Mickey Cochrane), The Detroit News, August 7, 1938 (reprinted in "They Earned Their Stripes", pp. 116–117)
- Mullin was a brainiac on the mound (George Mullin), The Detroit News, January 10, 1944 (reprinted in "They Earned Their Stripes", pp. 174–175)
- Goslin brought attitude then a title (Goose Goslin), The Detroit News (reprinted in "They Earned Their Stripes", pp. 156–157)
- Trick Schedule Tunes Out Radio, Baseball Digest, July 1945
- Speed Doesn't Count at Night, Baseball Digest, May 1947
- It's Howt-a-man (Art Houtteman), Baseball Digest, February 1948
- Groth Good, But He Still Must Grow-eth (Johnny Groth), Baseball Digest, January 1949
- The All-Time Tigers, Baseball Digest, February 1949
- Mr. Consistency Enters the Hall (Charlie Gehringer, Baseball Digest, July 1949
- Speaking Up for Speaker (Tris Speaker, Baseball Digest, August 1949
- Synonymitis (1950 Epidemic), Baseball Digest, July 1950
- American League's All-Timers, Baseball Digest, August 1950
- Trout Was Always Loose (Dizzy Trout, Baseball Digest, November 1950
- Heilmann was a magician at bat (Harry Heilmann), The Detroit News, July 10, 1951 (reprinted in "They Earned Their Stripes", pp. 112–113)
- Minor Whiz, Major Wheeze (Ox Eckhardt, Baseball Digest, July 1951
- Eight-Inning Winner (Hooks Dauss, Baseball Digest, August 1951
- Greatest Pitcher? Waddell! (Rube Waddell, Baseball Digest, September 1951
- It's a National League Year, Baseball Digest, September 1951
- Bobo and His Short Story (Bobo Newsom), Baseball Digest, October 1952
- Perfect Average System Unlikely, Baseball Digest, February 1953
- Diamond Odds Against Grid Stars, Baseball Digest, April 1953
- The Passing of a Symbol (Connie Mack), Baseball Digest, April 1956
- Dugout Dictionary, Baseball Digest, January 1957
- What a Scout Looks for in a Boy, Baseball Digest, June 1957
