= Charley Feeney =

American sportswriter (1924–2014)

- Born: November 26, 1924; Queens, New York, U.S.
- Died: March 17, 2014 (aged 89); Long Island, New York, U.S.
- Occupation: Sportswriter
- Employers: Long Island Star Journal (1946–1963); New York Journal American (1964–1966); Pittsburgh Post-Gazette (1966–1986)
- Awards: J. G. Taylor Spink Award (1996)

Charles V. Feeney (November 26, 1924 – March 17, 2014) was an American sportswriter in New York City and Pittsburgh for more than 40 years.

== Career ==
Born in Queens, New York, Feeney broke into the newspaper business at age 16 as a messenger for the New York Sun. During World War II, he served in the Navy from 1942 to 1946, earning a Bronze Star for his work as a radio man on the aircraft carrier USS Essex. Feeney next worked for the Long Island Star Journal, where, starting in 1951, he covered the Giants' final eight seasons in New York. From 1958, he covered the Yankees, first for the Star Journal, and, from 1964, for the New York Journal American. Following that paper's demise in 1966, when a job opening in Pittsburgh was created by the premature death of longtime Pirates beat writer Jack Hernon, Post-Gazette sports editor Al Abrams turned to Feeney, who filled the position until his retirement in 1986. In addition, following the retirement of Pittsburgh Press sports editor and longtime Bucs beat writer Les Biederman in March 1969, Feeney succeeded Biederman as The Sporting News' Pirates correspondent, in which capacity he also served until his retirement.

Feeney was the 1996 recipient of the J. G. Taylor Spink Award, given annually by the Baseball Writers' Association of America (BBWAA).

Feeney died on March 17, 2014, in Long Island, New York.

== Selected articles by Feeney ==
- Hard Luck No Stranger (Ferguson Jenkins), Baseball Digest, January 1969
- The Tooth-less Greeting: Day Brown Met Hebner (Richie Hebner), Pittsburgh Post-Gazette, May 6, 1969
- 3,000 Base Hits -- Next Goal for Clemente? (Roberto Clemente), Baseball Digest, October 1969
- Willie's Way (Willie Stargell), Pittsburgh Post-Gazette, September 22, 1971
- The Old Pro (José Pagán), Pittsburgh Post-Gazette, March 30, 1972
- Clemente: Next to Join 3,000 Hit Club (Roberto Clemente), Baseball Digest, August 1972
- Sparky Lyle: Key to 'New' Yankees (Sparky Lyle), Baseball Digest, November 1972
- Willie Mays Recalls His Rookie Year (Willie Mays), Baseball Digest, December 1973
- The Iron Man Pitcher With Shortstop Arm (Mike Marshall), Pittsburgh Post-Gazette, July 2, 1974
- Alvin Dark: A Man for All Seasons (Alvin Dark), Pittsburgh Post-Gazette, October 17, 1974
- The 78-Year-Old Oakland Cheerleader (George Blanda), Pittsburgh Post-Gazette, December 27, 1974
- Mr. Television for One Night (Ron Lyle), Pittsburgh Post-Gazette, May 15, 1975
- Pressure? What Pressure? (Sparky Anderson), Pittsburgh Post-Gazette, October 17, 1975
- One of a Kind (Danny Murtaugh), Pittsburgh Post-Gazette, December 4, 1976
- Putting the Rapp on Hrabosky (Vern Rapp/Al Hrabosky), Pittsburgh Post-Gazette, July 21, 1977
- Martin Reads George Between lines (Billy Martin), Pittsburgh Post-Gazette, October 18, 1977
