= Gordon Cobbledick =

American journalist

- Born: December 31, 1898; Cleveland, Ohio, U.S.
- Died: October 2, 1969 (aged 70); Tucson, Arizona, U.S.
- Education: Case School of Applied Science
- Occupation: Sports journalist
- Known for: Sports editor of The Plain Dealer
- Spouse: Doris M. Mathews (1901-1981)
- Family: 2 Sons William Cobbledick, Dorn Cobbledick
- Awards: J. G. Taylor Spink Award (1977)

Gordon Russell Cobbledick (December 31, 1898 – October 2, 1969) was an American sports journalist and author in Cleveland. He was the sports editor of The Plain Dealer for many years, and posthumously received the J. G. Taylor Spink Award, the highest award given by the Baseball Writers' Association of America.

== Early life ==
Cobbledick attended Case School of Applied Science, now known as Case Western Reserve University, where he studied mining engineering and was a member of Sigma Alpha Epsilon. He played college football for Case Tech, graduating in 1922. Some of his more popular nicknames were "Cobb" and "Cobby." After graduating, he became a mining engineer in Morgantown, West Virginia.

== Career ==
While visiting a friend in Cleveland, Cobbledick had opportunity to join The Plain Dealer; he decided to quit his mining job, and started his writing career in 1923 at a salary of $25 per week. Initially covering the police beat, he later became a sports writer. He also wrote for the short-lived Cleveland Times in 1926. He was elected president of the Baseball Writers' Association of America (BBWAA) in October 1942, and served in the role during 1943.

Cobbledick served as a war correspondent during World War II, and his account of the Battle of Okinawa written on V-E Day has been frequently reprinted and cited as an example of excellent war reporting. In 1947, he became the sports editor of The Plain Dealer. His works were frequently published in The Sporting News, Sports Illustrated, and Baseball Digest. Cobbledick's writing style was short and to the point.

Cobbledick was journalist for The Plain Dealer until 1964 when he retired. He later moved to Tucson, Arizona, where he died in 1969, aged 70.

=== Legacy ===
In 1977, Cobbledick was posthumously voted the J. G. Taylor Spink Award by the BBWAA. He was also inducted into the Journalism Hall of Fame in 1982 and the Greater Cleveland Sports Hall of Fame in 2007.

From 1963 through 2002, the Cleveland chapter of the BBWAA voted annually for the "Gordon Cobbledick Golden Tomahawk Award", which was awarded to the most underrated player of the Cleveland Indians. Recipients included Gaylord Perry (1973), Rick Sutcliffe (1984), and Travis Fryman (2000).

== Works ==
=== Books ===
- Cobbledick, Gordon (1966). Don't Knock the Rock: The Rocky Colavito Story. World Publishing Co. ASIN B0007E1B5M.

=== Selected articles ===
- Cries of Dying Spoil VE Day for Okinawa, Chicago Daily Tribune, May 9, 1945
- Slaughter in a Hurry (Enos Slaughter), Baseball Digest, November 1946
- "Cobb Taught Me Too" (Harry Heilmann), Baseball Digest, July 1947
- Confidence in Keltner (Ken Keltner), Baseball Digest, April 1948
- Feller Still Has Plenty on the Ball (Bob Feller), Baseball Digest, April 1953
- Sports Editor Gordon Cobbledick considers the beanball and decides it is here to stay—unless some means is found to outlaw wildness high and inside while sanctioning it low and outside, Sports Illustrated, August 16, 1954
- Harmony Is for the Birds, Baseball Digest, April 1955
- Sure, Modern Players Are Sissies!, Baseball Digest, September 1955
- Lampooning Platoon's an Old Time, Baseball Digest, November 1955
- Hitting Greatness Can't Be Taught, Baseball Digest, January 1956
- Sure, Fans Know More Than Managers, Baseball Digest, August 1956
- Ace Firemen Make Managers Smart, Baseball Digest, September 1956
- Records Prove It's Speaker Over DiMag! (Tris Speaker), Baseball Digest, October 1958
- Why Gordon Quit the Tigers (Joe Gordon), Baseball Digest, January 1961
- Pity the New Pilots, Baseball Digest, March 1961
