= Bus Saidt =

American journalist (1920–1989)

Harold N. "Bus" Saidt (November 11, 1920 – April 8, 1989) was an American sports writer who covered the Philadelphia Phillies, New York Mets, and the New York Yankees for the Trentonian and the Trenton Times.

He was awarded the J. G. Taylor Spink Award in 1992.
