= Phil Collier =

American sportswriter (1925–2001)

- Born: December 7, 1925; Stanton, Texas, U.S.
- Died: February 24, 2001 (aged 75); San Diego, California, U.S.
- Education: Texas Christian University
- Occupation: Sportswriter
- Spouse: Ruth Collier
- Children: 4
- Writing career
- Notable awards: J. G. Taylor Spink Award (1990)

Philip Collier (December 7, 1925 – February 24, 2001) was an American sportswriter who worked in the San Diego area for many years. Along with sports editor Jack Murphy, he was instrumental in bringing Major League Baseball to the city in the form of the expansion team San Diego Padres.

Born in Stanton, Texas, Collier began his career as a sportswriter in Baytown, Texas, in 1939. After military service, he attended Texas Christian University and, between classes, worked at the Fort Worth Star-Telegram.

In 1953, Collier joined the San Diego Union where he covered the San Diego Padres of the Pacific Coast League until the Brooklyn Dodgers moved to Los Angeles in 1958. For the next decade, he covered both Dodgers and Los Angeles Angels games for the Union.

Collier was the sportswriter whom Sandy Koufax first told about his decision to retire, during the 1965 season. Koufax, who was close friends with Collier, told him that 1966 would be his final season and requested he keep the news confidential; he called the day before announcing his retirement in a press conference so that Collier could break the story.

When San Diego was awarded the expansion San Diego Padres in 1969, Collier began covering the team, which he would do for 18 seasons. In 1987, he became the national baseball columnist for the Union. He continued to write for the Union-Tribune after its merger with the San Diego Tribune in 1992. He retired from the paper in 1996.

He was awarded the J. G. Taylor Spink Award by the Baseball Hall of Fame in 1990.

Collier died in San Diego, California, of prostate cancer.
