= Joe Reichler =

American sports writer (1915–1988)

Joseph Lawrence Reichler (January 1, 1915 – December 12, 1988) was an American sports writer who worked for the Associated Press from 1943 to 1966. He mostly covered the New York City based baseball teams. Reichler also wrote many baseball books, and worked for the Office of the Commissioner of Baseball.

In 1982, it was discovered that he sold items that had earlier been donated to the Baseball Hall of Fame to cover his financial problems.

He was awarded the J. G. Taylor Spink Award by the Baseball Writers' Association of America in 1980.
