= Ray Kelly (sportswriter) =

American sportswriter

Raymond Kelly (January 24, 1914, in Philadelphia, Pennsylvania United States – November 22, 1988, in Philadelphia) was a sportswriter who worked 50 years for the Philadelphia Bulletin. He covered the Philadelphia Athletics from 1948 to 1955 and the Philadelphia Phillies from 1956 until he retired in 1979.

A president of both the Philadelphia and national chapters of the Baseball Writers' Association of America, Kelly was a posthumous recipient of the J. G. Taylor Spink Award in 1989. The Philadelphia Old Timers' Soccer Association inducted Kelly into its Hall of Fame in 1985.

He died at age 74 at Nazareth Hospital in Philadelphia and was cremated.
