= John Drebinger =

American sportswriter (1891–1979)

- Born: March 23, 1891; Staten Island, New York
- Died: October 22, 1979 (aged 88); Greensboro, North Carolina
- Occupation: Baseball reporter
- Years active: 1911–1964
- Employer(s): Staten Island Advance, The New York Times
- Spouse: Madeline
- Children: 1
- Awards: J. G. Taylor Spink Award (1973)

John Drebinger (March 23, 1891 – October 22, 1979), nicknamed "Drebby", was an American sportswriter in New York City for over 50 years. Between 1929 and 1963, he wrote the lead story in The New York Times for every World Series contest, a total of 203 games.

== Biography ==
Drebinger graduated from Curtis High School on Staten Island and went to work for the Staten Island Advance in 1911. He moved to The New York Times in 1923, and worked there until retiring in 1964. Drebinger estimated that he traveled 1,230,000 miles (1,980,000 km) in his career as a sportswriter covering the Brooklyn Dodgers, New York Giants, and New York Yankees.

In 1973, Drebinger was honored by the Baseball Writers' Association of America with the J. G. Taylor Spink Award for distinguished baseball writing.

Drebinger died at a nursing home in North Carolina in October 1979. He was survived by his wife, Madeline, and a son.
