= Bob Hunter (Los Angeles sportswriter) =

American sportswriter (1913–1993)

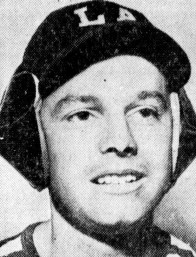
Bob Hunter modeling a new baseball helmet in 1939.

Bob Hunter (March 19, 1913 – October 21, 1993) was a Los Angeles sportswriter for 58 years and the 1989 winner of the J. G. Taylor Spink Award for distinguished baseball writing.

== Early life ==
Bob Hunter was born March 19, 1913, and went to Huntington Park High School in Huntington Park, California. After attending the University of Southern California, he went to Southwestern Law School in Los Angeles.

== Career ==
His career as a baseball writer began in the late 1930s at the Post Record in Los Angeles, where he covered the Los Angeles Angels and Hollywood Stars of the Pacific Coast League. Los Angeles at that time did not have a major league baseball team, though as many as half a dozen major league teams trained in the area.

On November 11, 1943, Bob Hunter quit law school to go to work for the Los Angeles Examiner.

In 1957 he covered the Dodgers in their final season in Brooklyn, N.Y., and along with Los Angeles Examiner columnist Vincent X. Flaherty was at the forefront of the group responsible for bringing the Dodgers to Los Angeles.

When the Dodgers moved to Los Angeles in 1958, Hunter was elected the first chairman of the Los Angeles chapter of the Baseball Writers' Association of America (BBWAA). He was later re-elected chairman of the Anaheim/LA branch, and was the first West Coast writer to be national chairman of the BBWAA.

His coverage of the Los Angeles Dodgers, spanned more than 30 years and included every spring training through 1992. In honor of this long association, the writer's room at the Vero Beach, Florida training camp is named for him. It was also at the spring training camp that former Dodgers owner and poker buddy Walter O'Malley began calling Hunter "The Chopper" because Hunter was the one who divided up the pot after every hand at the evening high-low poker games. It was a nickname that Hunter was known by to many press-box writer friends from then on.

As a sideline, Hunter was part-owner of a bar called the Sports Club at Fifth and Hill in downtown Los Angeles. Dan Hafner of the Los Angeles Times reported, "His friendship with so many baseball managers enabled him to throw a post-World Series party each fall during the 1950s that was almost always attended by the managers of the World Series opponents."

Hunter continued writing for the Examiner when it became the Los Angeles Herald-Examiner after a merger in 1962, and from 1977 until his retirement in May 1992 he worked for the Los Angeles Daily News.

His column was titled, "Bobbin' Around", and his stories were included in the "Best Sport Stories of the Year" for 25 consecutive years.

In addition to his baseball writing, he authored the script for the Laraine Day/Leo Durocher TV series, "Double Play With Durocher Day," and was honored with the appointment of official scorer for four World Series and four All-Star Games.

== Honors ==
In 1988, Hunter was honored by the Baseball Writers' Association of America with the J. G. Taylor Spink Award for distinguished baseball writing.

He died at the age of 80 on October 21, 1993 at Sherman Oaks Convalescent Hospital in Los Angeles after a long illness. John Werhas, a former Dodgers infielder and pastor of the Friends Church in Yorba Linda, officiated at his funeral. He is buried at Forest Lawn Cemetery in the Hollywood Hills.

In his honor, the Bob Hunter Award is presented by the Los Angeles/Anaheim chapter of the Baseball Writers' Association of America.
