= Joe Durso =

American journalist (1924–2004)

Joseph P. Durso (June 22, 1924 – December 31, 2004) was an American sportswriter for The New York Times from 1950 until his death, most noted for his coverage of baseball.

Born in New York City, he was awarded the J. G. Taylor Spink Award in 1995.

He died at the age of 80.

His son, Peter Durso, was the Director or Promotions and Traveling Secretary for the Toronto Blue Jays in their early years from 1977 to 1979.
