= Ken Smith (sportswriter) =

American sportwriter (1902–1991)

Smith in 1965

Kenneth Smith (1902–1991) was an American sports writer who covered the New York Giants for the New York Graphic and the New York Mirror from 1925 to 1957. He later served as the director National Baseball Hall of Fame and Museum, and was the museum's public relations director from 1976 to 1979.

Smith was awarded the J. G. Taylor Spink Award by the Baseball Writers' Association of America (BBWAA) in December 1983.

Born in Danbury, Connecticut, in 1902, Smith died on March 1, 1991.
