= Edgar Munzel =

American sportswriter

- Born: January 14, 1907; Reynolds, Indiana
- Died: October 4, 2002 (aged 95)
- Education: Northwestern University
- Occupation: Sportswriter
- Years active: 1927–1973
- Employer(s): Chicago Herald-Examiner, Chicago Sun-Times
- Known for: Baseball writing
- Spouse: Rose Bublis (m. 1941)
- Children: 1
- Awards: J. G. Taylor Spink Award (1977)

Edgar Herman Munzel (January 14, 1907 – October 4, 2002) was an American sportswriter who covered baseball for the Chicago Herald-Examiner and Chicago Sun-Times from 1929 to 1973.

== Biography ==
Munzel first worked for the Chicago Herald-Examiner part-time in 1922 at age 15. After graduating from high school in 1925, he attended Northwestern University for two years. He started working full-time for the Herald-Examiner in 1927, and began covering the Chicago White Sox in 1929. He later move to the Chicago Sun-Times and covered both the White Sox and the Chicago Cubs until retiring in October 1973. During his career, he covered 34 World Series and 36 Major League Baseball All-Star Games. In his retirement, he moved to Williamsburg, Virginia.

Munzel served as president of the Baseball Writers' Association of America (BBWAA) at one time, and in 1977 was voted the J. G. Taylor Spink Award by the organization. Munzel died in October 2002.
