= Tom Meany =

American sportswriter (1909–1964)

- Born: September 21, 1903; Brooklyn, New York, US
- Died: September 11, 1964 (aged 60); Manhattan, New York, US
- Occupations: Journalist, public relations
- Spouse: Clara Maxwell
- Writing career
- Subject: Sports
- Notable awards: J. G. Taylor Spink Award (1975)

Thomas William Meany (September 21, 1903 – September 11, 1964) was an American sports writer who mostly covered baseball in the New York City area.

== Biography ==
Meany's love of sports began at St. John's Prep in Brooklyn, where he wrote for the school newspaper and played basketball and baseball.

Meany began his professional writing career in 1922, where he was recruited to write for the New York Journal. Throughout his career, Meany worked for several newspapers, including the Brooklyn Daily Times, New York World-Telegram, and the Morning Telegraph. He wrote several books, including The Magnificent Yankees about members of the New York Yankees, which was published in 1952. In 1961, Meany joined the New York Mets baseball team as a publicity director, and later served as their promotions director.

Meany died at Roosevelt Hospital in Manhattan in 1964; he was survived by his wife, Clara Maxwell. In 1975, Meany was posthumously voted the J. G. Taylor Spink Award, the highest award bestowed by the Baseball Writers' Association of America (BBWAA).

== Books ==
- Meany, Tom (1949). Baseball's Greatest Teams. New York City: A.S. Barnes. OCLC 19174630.
- Meany, Tom (1950). Baseball's Greatest Hitters. New York City: A.S. Barnes. ASIN B0006ASCCC.
- Meany, Tom (1951). Babe Ruth: The Big Moments of the Big Fellow. New York City: Grosset & Dunlap. ASIN B000KWOE32.
- Meany, Tom (1952). The Magnificent Yankees. New York City: Grosset & Dunlap. OCLC 49963288.
- Meany, Tom (1956). Milwaukee's Miracle Braves. New York City: A.S. Barnes. OCLC 1482544.
- Meany, Tom (1958). Mostly Baseball. New York City: A.S. Barnes. ASIN B0007DP4AQ.
- Meany, Tom; Holmes, Tommy (1964). Baseball's Best: The All-Time Major League Baseball Team. Franklin Watts. ASIN B0006BM6OG.
