= Nellie Fox =

American baseball player (1927–1975)

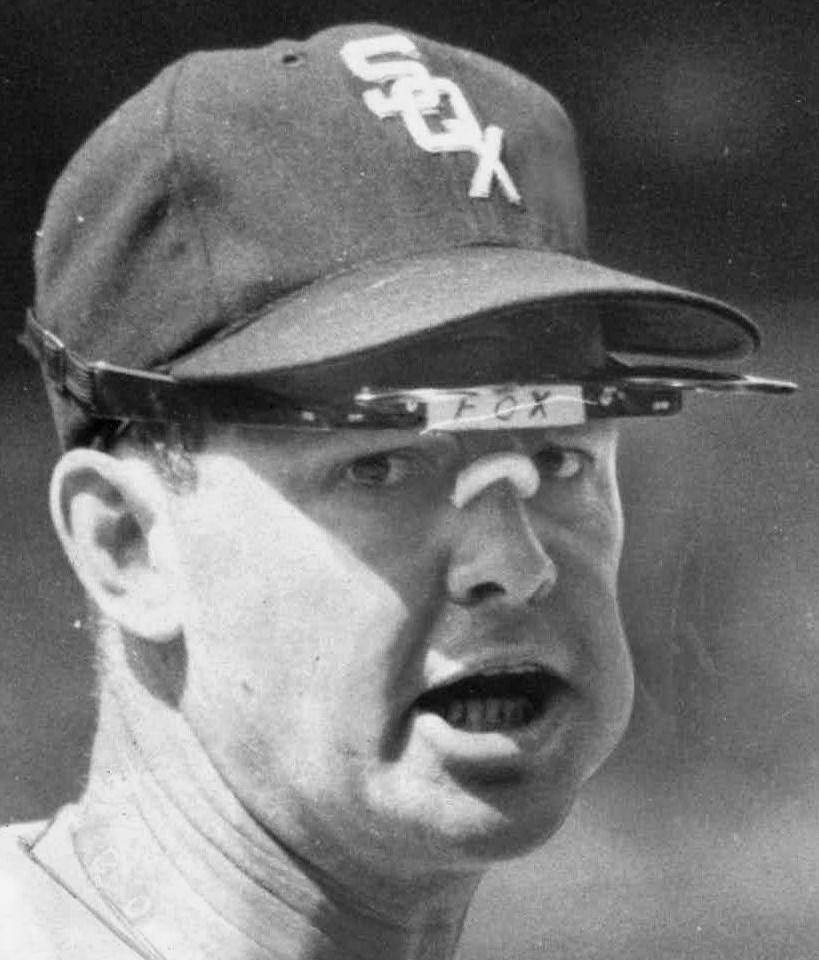
- Fox in 1960
- Second baseman
- Born: December 25, 1927; St. Thomas Township, Pennsylvania, U.S.
- Died: December 1, 1975 (aged 47); Baltimore, Maryland, U.S.
- Batted: Left Threw: Right

MLB debut
- June 8, 1947, for the Philadelphia Athletics

Last MLB appearance
- July 24, 1965, for the Houston Astros

MLB statistics
- Batting average: .288
- Hits: 2,663
- Home runs: 35
- Runs batted in: 790
- Stats at Baseball Reference

Teams
- Philadelphia Athletics (1947–1949); Chicago White Sox (1950–1963); Houston Colt .45s / Astros (1964–1965)

Career highlights and awards
- 15× All-Star (1951–1961², 1963); AL MVP (1959); 3× Gold Glove Award (1957, 1959, 1960); Chicago White Sox No. 2 retired

Member of the National

Baseball Hall of Fame
- Induction: 1997
- Vote: Veterans Committee

Jacob Nelson Fox (December 25, 1927 – December 1, 1975) was an American professional baseball player. Fox was one of the best second basemen of all time, and the third-most difficult hitter to strike out in Major League Baseball (MLB) history. Fox played in the big leagues from 1947 through 1965 and spent the majority of his career as a member of the Chicago White Sox; his career was bookended by multi-year stints for the Philadelphia Athletics and, later, the Houston Astros.

Fox was an American League (AL) All-Star for twelve seasons, (Note: MLB held two All-Star Games from 1959 through 1962) an AL Most Valuable Player (MVP) for one season, and an AL Gold Glove winner for three seasons. He had a .288 major-league career batting average with 2663 hits, 35 home runs, and 790 runs batted in. He hit .300 or more six times, and led the AL in singles eight times (seven consecutive seasons) and in fielding average six times as a second baseman. His career fielding percentage was .984. In 1959, when the "Go Go" Chicago White Sox won the American League pennant, he hit .306 with 149 singles and 70 RBI. He coached for the Houston Astros and Texas Rangers after his playing career. He was inducted into the National Baseball Hall of Fame in 1997.

== Early years ==
Fox was born on Christmas Day 1927 in St. Thomas Township, Pennsylvania, a rural area just west of Chambersburg, in south central Pennsylvania. He was the youngest of three sons born to a carpenter who grew up on a farm and liked to play town baseball in St. Thomas. Despite his short stature, with the help of his father, Fox distinguished himself as a baseball player at a young age, even playing with his father on their St. Thomas team.

Fox at age 16 in 1944, thought that he had a good chance to sign on with a professional baseball team due to player shortages during World War II. His mother wrote a letter on her son's behalf to Connie Mack, the owner/manager of the Philadelphia Athletics, which enabled him to attend an open tryout that spring for the Athletics in Frederick, Maryland. Fox caught the attention of Mack, who signed him to a professional contract.

== Professional baseball ==
=== Minor leagues ===
Fox started his professional baseball career with the Lancaster team of the Pennsylvania Interstate League and the Jamestown Falcons where he hit .314. He played a range of infield and outfield positions, ultimately settling at second base. He came back with Lancaster in 1945 and was known as the best second baseman in the league. The Philadelphia Athletics bought his contract that year, but Fox did not get to play for them then because he was called to service and was stationed in Korea in 1946.

=== Major leagues ===
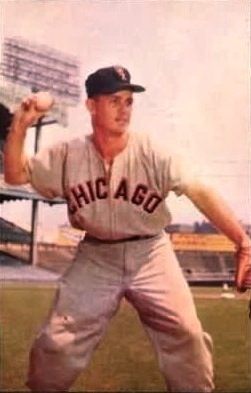
Fox in 1953

Fox's major league career began in 1947 when he started to play for the Philadelphia Athletics, but he played mostly in the minor leagues, appearing in a total of ten MLB games in 1947 and 1948. In 1949, the Philadelphia Athletics set a major league team record of 217 double plays, a record which still stood as of 2023. Fox appeared in 88 of the Athletics games that season, and contributed to 68 of the team's double plays.

The Athletics traded Fox to the Chicago White Sox for Joe Tipton on October 29, 1949. He spent the next 14 seasons with the Sox, making 12 AL All-Star teams and 15 of 16 AL All-Star Game selections beginning in 1951 (two All-Star games were played in 1959 through 1962) when he batted .313. The White Sox finished in third place in each season between 1952 and 1956, followed by second-place finishes in 1957 and 1958 (Baseball-Reference.com lists Billy Pierce and Minnie Miñoso as the top White Sox players during most of those years, as reflected by wins above replacement (WAR), but Fox had the team's highest WAR in 1957).

==== 1959 season ====
Fox's best season came in 1959, when he received the AL Most Valuable Player award (not until Dustin Pedroia in 2008 would another American League second baseman receive such an honor) on a White Sox team that won its first AL pennant in 40 years. He batted .306, had an on-base percentage of .380, and led the AL in singles. He also started and had four hits in two All-Star games and won his second Gold Glove. The Al López-managed White Sox had the best record in baseball, going 94-60 to finish five games ahead of the Cleveland Indians and a surprising 15 ahead of the New York Yankees. It was one of just two seasons the Yankees did not win the pennant between 1949–1964.

In the World Series, Fox batted a team-high .375 with three doubles, but the Sox lost to the Los Angeles Dodgers in six games. In Game 5, Fox scored the only run when Sherm Lollar hit into a double play in the fourth inning (this was only the second time that a World Series game did not have an RBI). It was Fox's only postseason experience, and the White Sox did not make it back to the World Series until they swept the 2005 World Series from the Houston Astros.

==== Later career ====
Fox played his final two seasons (1964–65) with the Houston Colt .45s and Astros. Joe Morgan later said that he looked up to Fox's example as a rookie with the Astros; Fox and Morgan were both diminutive second basemen. Morgan grew up hitting with a Nellie Fox model bat, which had a large barrel and large handle. With the Astros, Fox convinced Morgan to switch to a bat with a thin handle to leverage his power.

Fox was 5-foot-9, but made up for his modest size and minimal power — he hit only 35 home runs in his career, and never more than six in a single season — with his good batting eye, excellent fielding, and baserunning speed. Fox was perennially one of the toughest batters to strike out, fanning just 216 times in his career, an average of once every 42.7 at-bats, which ranks him fifth all-time. He led the league in most at-bats per strikeouts a phenomenal 13 times in his career. In 1951, Fox hit more triples (12) than he had strikeouts (11). A solid contact hitter (lifetime .288 batting average), he batted over .300 six times, with 2,663 hits, 355 doubles, and 112 triples. He also led the league in singles for seven straight years, in triples once, and in hits four times.

==== Defensive skills ====
Fox was one of the best second basemen in the major leagues. He played next to a pair of slick-fielding White Sox shortstops from Venezuela, Chico Carrasquel (1950–55) and Luis Aparicio (1956–62). He was the first major league Gold Glove Award winner for a second baseman in 1957, and he received two more Gold Glove awards, in 1959 and 1960. Between August 1956 and September 1960, Fox played a major-league record 798 consecutive games at second base. In 1959 and 1960, the Aparicio-Fox middle infield duo won two Gold Gloves twice for their respective positions, becoming the first (of now a dozen) shortstop-second baseman combinations who both won Gold Gloves in the same season.

Fox led the league's second basemen in defensive games played each season between 1952 and 1959. He also led second basemen in putouts between 1952 and 1961, and in assists several times during his career. Fox finished among the top five second basemen in fielding percentage every year between 1950 and 1964, and currently ranks second in career double plays as a second baseman.

==== Coaching seasons ====
Fox was a coach for the Houston Astros (1965–67) and the Washington Senators/Texas Rangers (1968–72). In 1969, Fox appeared to have a chance to manage the Senators when Jim Lemon's post came open following the team's purchase by Bob Short. However, around the same time, the Washington Redskins named Vince Lombardi as their football coach, so Short felt pressure to hire a manager with a very well-known name and selected Ted Williams for the position.

=== Career statistics ===
| G | AB | R | H | 2B | 3B | HR | RBI | BB | SO | AVG | OBP | SLG | OPS | FLD% |
|---|---|---|---|---|---|---|---|---|---|---|---|---|---|---|
| 2367 | 9232 | 1279 | 2663 | 355 | 112 | 35 | 790 | 719 | 216 | .288 | .348 | .363 | .710 | .984 |

== Later years ==
Fox lived in St. Thomas Township, Pennsylvania, after his playing days were over. He co-owned and managed Nellie Fox Bowl in Chambersburg after retiring from baseball. Fox was diagnosed with skin cancer in 1973. In October 1975, he was admitted to the Baltimore Cancer Research Center and treated for metastatic cancer. Fox died on December 1, 1975, at the age of 47. He was buried at the St. Thomas Cemetery in his hometown of St. Thomas.

== Legacy ==
Nellie Fox's number 2 was retired by the Chicago White Sox in 1976.

Jim Lemon, who played for the White Sox with Fox in 1963, said that Fox's cancer "had to be incurable – because if it wasn't, Nellie would have beat it." Former White Sox manager Al López described how Fox had found success through hard work rather than natural ability: "He wasn't fast and didn't have an arm, but he worked hard to develop what he needed to make himself a good all-around ballplayer. If you had eight Nellie Foxes, all with his spirit and determination, I think you'd have a winning team." On May 1, 1976, Fox's uniform number 2 was retired by the White Sox; he is the second of ten White Sox players to have his uniform number retired.

Fox was not selected to the Hall of Fame in his initial period of eligibility. In his final ballot cast by baseball writers in 1985, he gained 74.7 percent of the vote, just shy of the 75 percent (traditionally baseball percentages were rounded off) required for election by the Baseball Writers' Association of America. However, in 1997, the Hall of Fame's Veterans Committee elected him. He had the required 75% of the committee's vote in 1996, but the committee was allowed to vote in only one former MLB player; Jim Bunning was inducted after receiving one more vote than Fox. Prior to his Hall of Fame election, a group of fans formed the Nellie Fox Society to promote his case for induction. The group grew to as many as 600 members, including Richard M. Daley, James R. Thompson, George Will and several former MLB players.

In 2001, a Pennsylvania state historical marker was dedicated to honor Fox. Bronze statues of Fox and Aparicio were unveiled on the outfield concourse of U.S. Cellular Field in 2006. Fox's statue depicts him flipping a baseball toward Aparicio, while Aparicio is depicted as preparing to receive the ball from Fox.

== See also ==
- Houston Astros award winners and league leaders
- List of Major League Baseball career hits leaders
- List of Major League Baseball career triples leaders
- List of Major League Baseball career runs scored leaders
- List of Major League Baseball annual triples leaders
- Major League Baseball consecutive games played streaks
