= List of members of the National Baseball Hall of Fame =

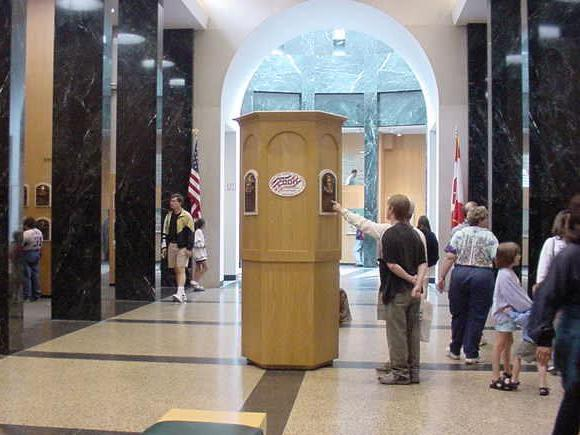
The plaque gallery at the Baseball Hall of Fame

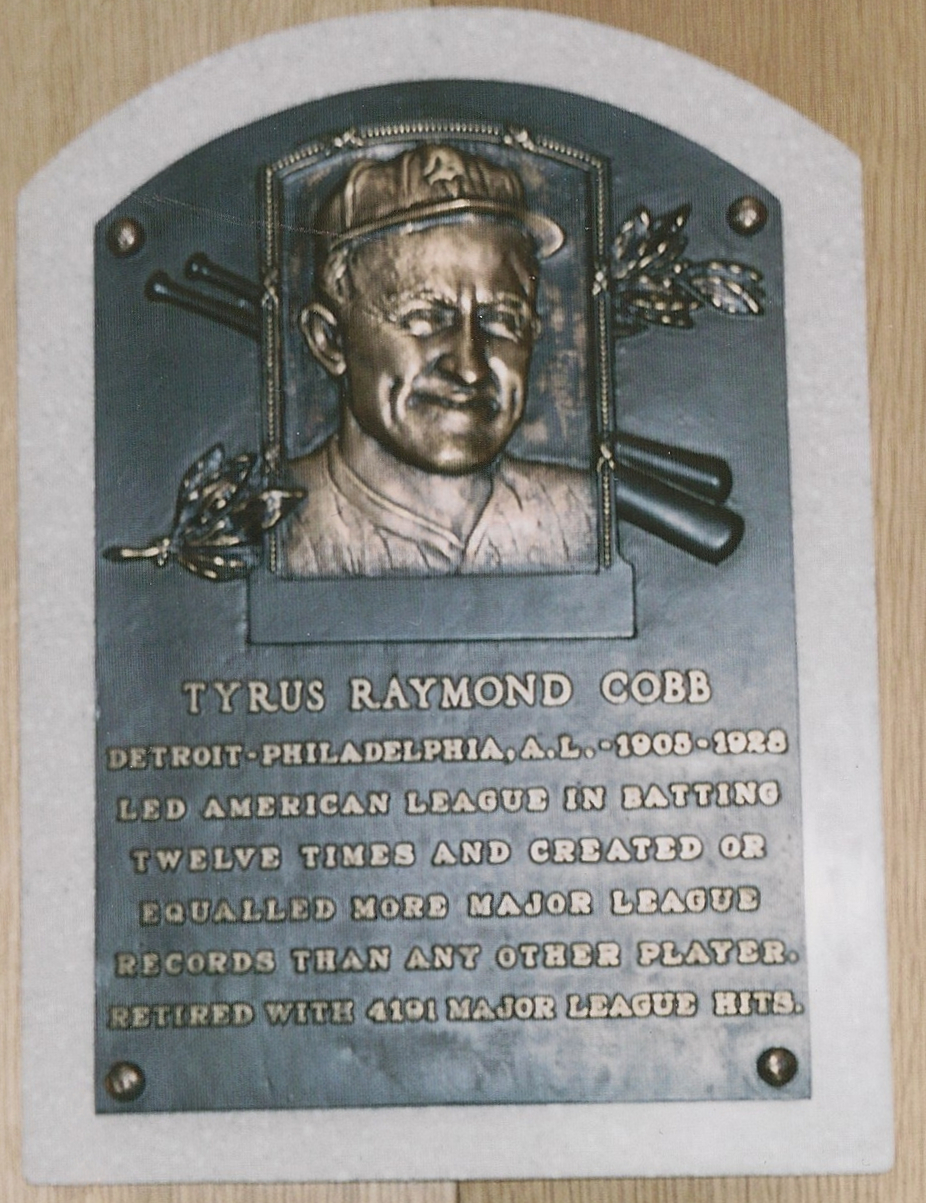
Ty Cobb's plaque at the Baseball Hall of Fame

The National Baseball Hall of Fame and Museum in Cooperstown, New York, honors individuals who have excelled in playing, managing, and serving the sport, and is the central point for the study of the history of baseball in the United States and beyond, displaying baseball-related artifacts and exhibits. Elections of worthy individuals to be honored by induction into the Hall of Fame commenced in 1936, although the first induction ceremonies were not held until the hall opened in 1939. Through the elections for 2026, a total of 354 people will have been inducted, including 281 former professional players, 40 executives/pioneers, 23 managers, and 10 umpires. Each is listed showing his primary position; that is, the position or role in which the player made his greatest contribution to baseball according to the Hall of Fame.

According to the current rules, players must have at least 10 years of major league experience to be eligible for induction. In addition, they must be retired for at least five years if living, or deceased for at least six months. Players meeting these qualifications must pass through a screening committee, and are then voted on by the Baseball Writers' Association of America (BBWAA). Each writer may vote for up to 10 players; to be admitted into the Hall of Fame, a player must be approved by 75% of those casting ballots. Players receiving less than 5% approval are removed from future BBWAA ballots. The rules, as revised in July 2016, allow that all individuals eligible for induction but not for the BBWAA ballot—players who have not been approved by the BBWAA election process within 15 years of their retirement, umpires, managers, pioneers, and executives—may be considered by one of four voting bodies that have taken over the role of the former Veterans Committee, based on the era in which each individual candidate made his greatest contribution to the sport. On a few occasions, exceptions have been made to the guidelines in place at the time: Lou Gehrig was elected in 1939 following his diagnosis of amyotrophic lateral sclerosis; Roberto Clemente was elected shortly after his death in 1972; and Addie Joss was elected in 1978 even though he completed only nine seasons before his death.

Between 1971 and 1977, nine players from the Negro leagues were inducted by a special Negro Leagues Committee, which was given the task of identifying worthy players who played in the Negro leagues prior to the breaking of baseball's color line. Since 1977, players from the Negro leagues have been considered by the Veterans Committee, and nine more individuals have been approved by that body. In 2005, the Hall announced the formation of a Committee on African-American Baseball, which held a 2006 election for eligible figures from the Negro leagues and earlier 19th-century teams; 17 additional Negro leagues figures were chosen in that election, including executive Effa Manley, the first woman inducted.

== Key ==
Year	Links to the article about that year's election
Position	The first position listed is the position at which the individual is best known.
Italics	Players who were elected in their first year of eligibility.
EXEC	Baseball executives, such as a general manager
MGR	Managers
PIO	Pioneer contributors
UMP	Umpires
BBWAA	Baseball Writers' Association of America
VC	Veterans Committee
NLC	Veterans Committee based on Negro league career
SCNL	Special committee on the Negro leagues and the pre-Negro leagues
PI	Pre-Integration Committee
GE	Golden Era Committee
EE	Expansion Era Committee
TG	Today's Game Era Committee
MB	Modern Baseball Era Committee
GD	Golden Days Era Committee
EB	Early Baseball Era Committee
COB	Contemporary Baseball Era Committee
CLB	Classic Baseball Era Committee

P	Pitcher
C	Catcher
1B	First baseman
2B	Second baseman
3B	Third baseman
SS	Shortstop
LF	Left fielder
CF	Center fielder
RF	Right fielder
DH	Designated hitter

== Members ==
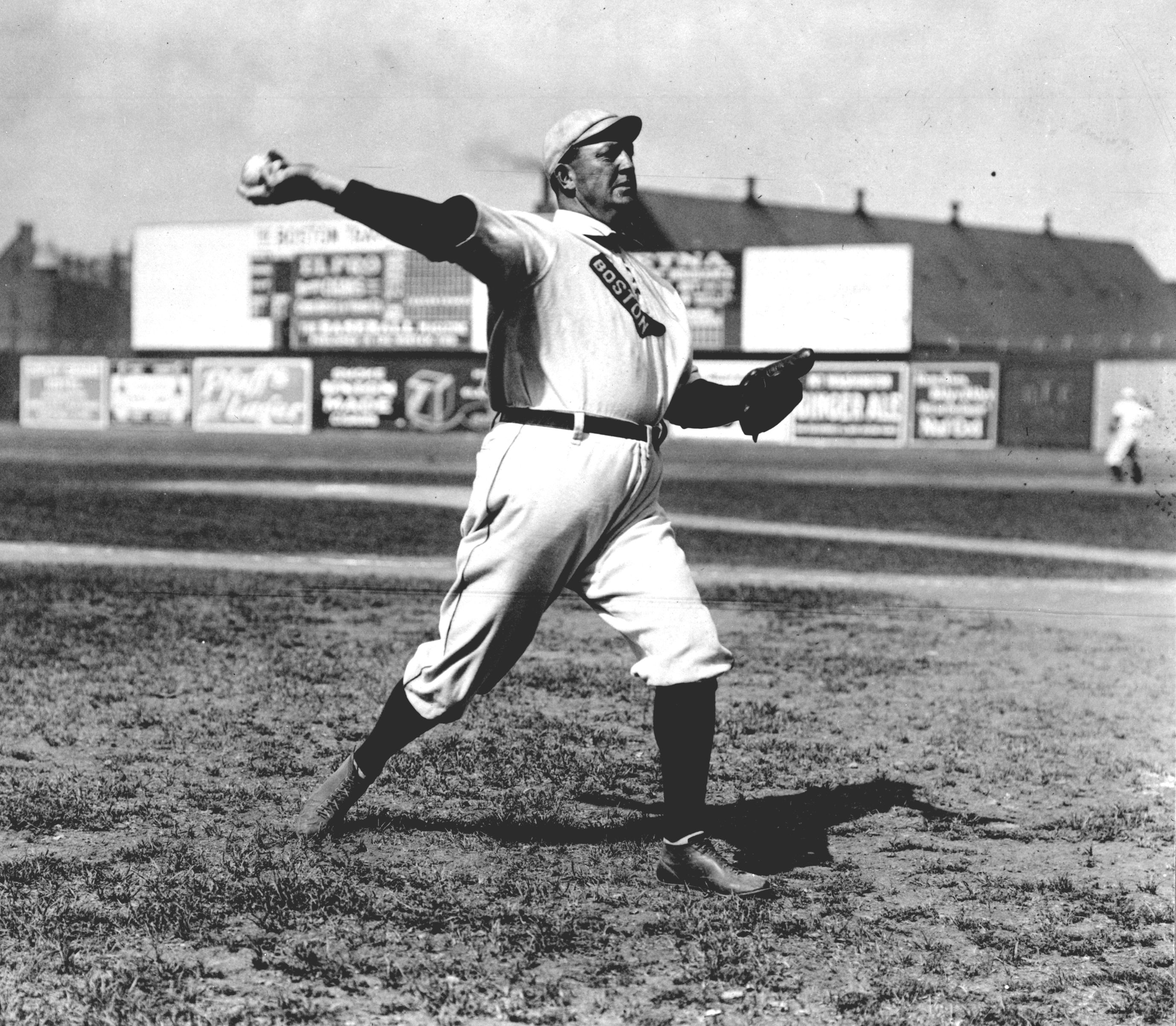
Cy Young, elected 1937

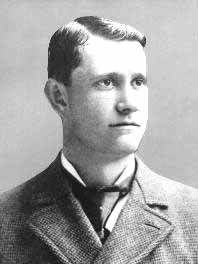
Ed Delahanty, elected 1945

Ed Walsh, elected 1946

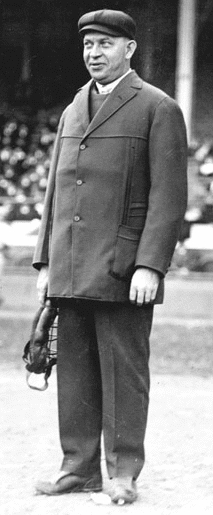
Bill Klem, elected 1953

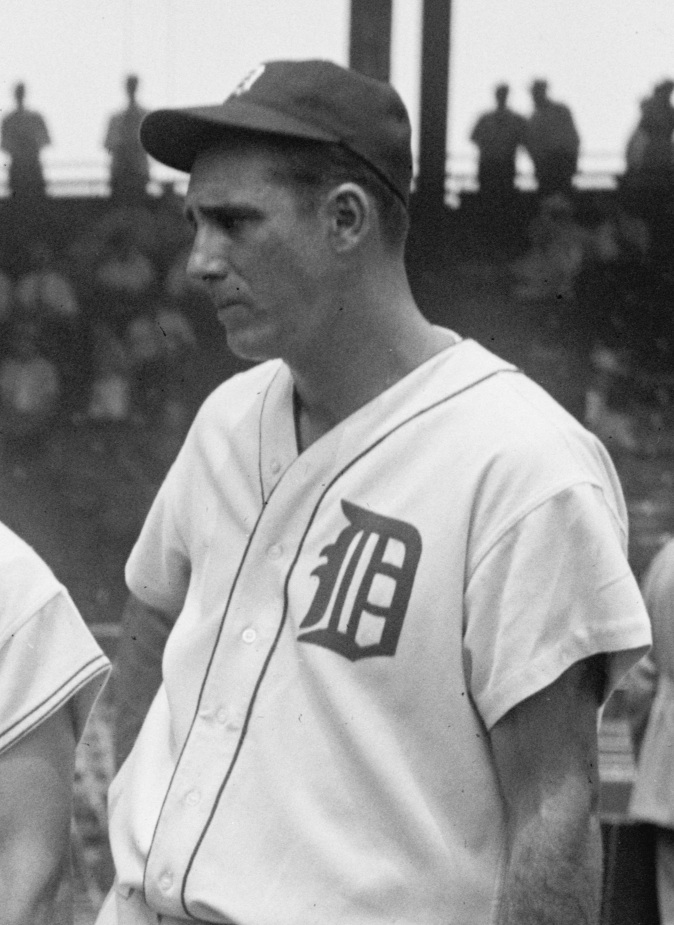
Hank Greenberg, elected 1956

Sandy Koufax, elected 1972

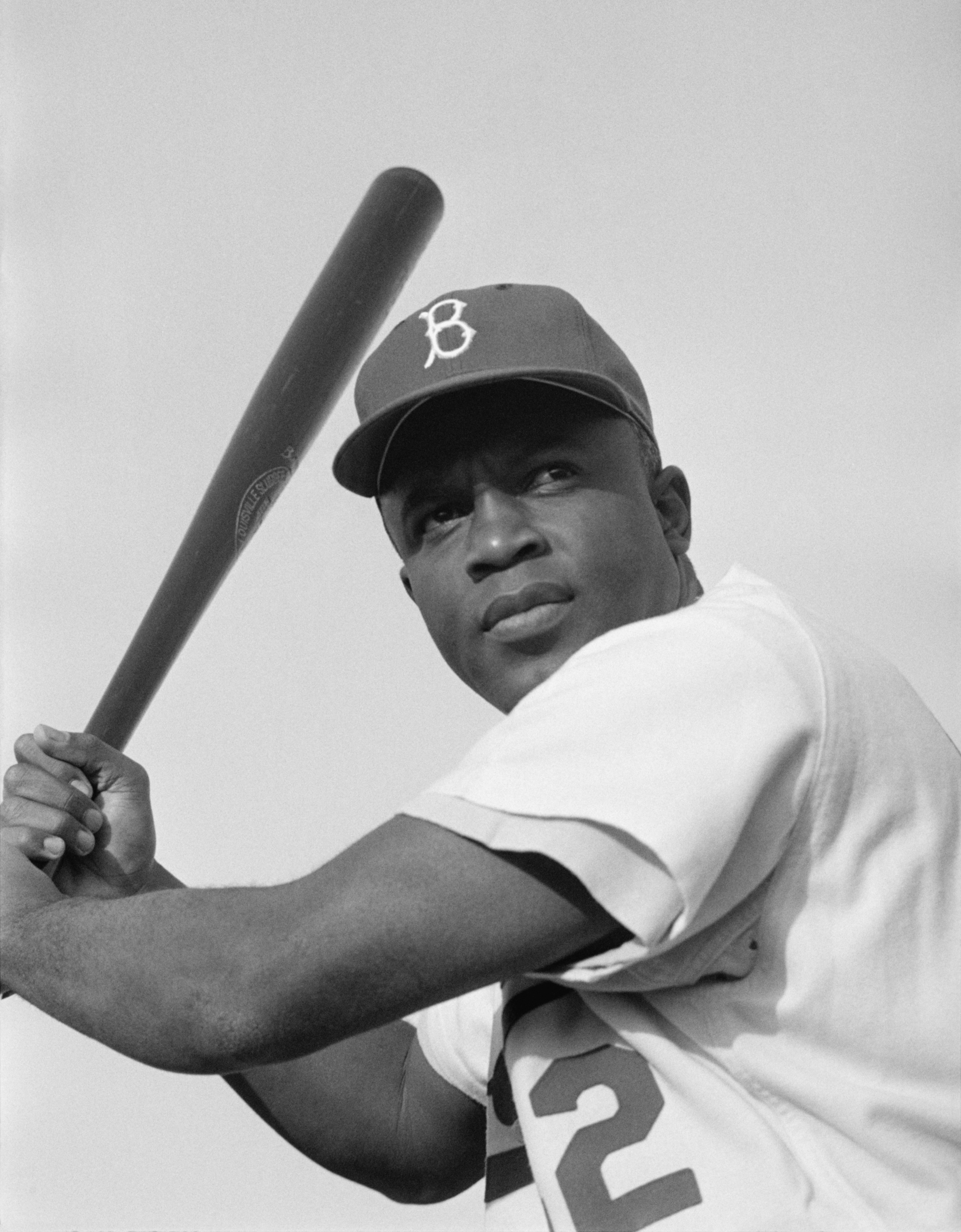
Jackie Robinson, elected 1962

In the table below, "primary team" is based on the inductees' biographies at the Hall of Fame website. This does not necessarily match the cap logo on the inductee's Hall of Fame plaque (if applicable; those inducted as executives are shown without caps, and many early players are depicted without cap logos because logos were not in use during the individuals' careers).

Overview of members of the Baseball Hall of Fame
Year	Name	Primary position	Primary team	Career	Induction method	Vote %	Ref.
1936	Ty Cobb	CF	Detroit Tigers	1905–1928	BBWAA	98.23%	
1936	Walter Johnson	P	Washington Senators	1907–1927	BBWAA	83.63%	
1936	Christy Mathewson	P	New York Giants	1900–1916	BBWAA	90.71%	
1936	Babe Ruth	RF	New York Yankees	1914–1935	BBWAA	95.13%	
1936	Honus Wagner	SS	Pittsburgh Pirates	1897–1917	BBWAA	95.13%	
1937	Morgan Bulkeley	EXEC	—	1874–1876	VC	—^{1}	
1937	Ban Johnson	EXEC	—	1900–1927	VC	—^{1}	
1937	Nap Lajoie	2B	Cleveland Indians	1896–1916	BBWAA	83.58%	
1937	Connie Mack	MGR	Philadelphia Athletics	1894–1950	VC	—^{1}	
1937	John McGraw	MGR	New York Giants	1899; 1901–1932	VC	—^{1}	
1937	Tris Speaker	CF	Cleveland Indians	1907–1928	BBWAA	82.09%	
1937	George Wright	EXEC/PIO	Boston Red Stockings	1867–1882	VC	—^{1}	
1937	Cy Young	P	Cleveland Spiders (Note: Plaque features a Cleveland Naps logo.)	1890–1911	BBWAA	76.12%	
1938	Grover Cleveland Alexander	P	Philadelphia Phillies	1911–1930	BBWAA	80.92%	
1938	Alexander Cartwright	PIO	Knickerbocker Base Ball Club	—	VC	—^{1}	
1938	Henry Chadwick	PIO	—	—	VC	—^{1}	
1939	Cap Anson	1B	Chicago White Stockings	1871–1897	VC	—^{1}	
1939	Eddie Collins	2B	Chicago White Sox	1906–1930	BBWAA	77.74%	
1939	Charles Comiskey	EXEC/PIO	Chicago White Sox	1900–1931	VC	—^{1}	
1939	Candy Cummings	EXEC/PIO	Hartford Dark Blues	1872–1877	VC	—^{1}	
1939	Buck Ewing	C	New York Giants	1880–1897	VC	—^{1}	
1939	Lou Gehrig	1B	New York Yankees	1923–1939	BBWAA	—^{4}	
1939	Willie Keeler	RF	New York Highlanders (Note: Plaque features a Brooklyn Superbas logo.)	1892–1910	BBWAA	75.55%	
1939	Charles Radbourn	P	Providence Grays	1881–1891	VC	—^{1}	
1939	George Sisler	1B	St. Louis Browns	1915–1922; 1924–1930	BBWAA	85.77%	
1939	Albert Spalding	EXEC/PIO	Chicago White Stockings	1871–1878	VC	—^{1}	
1942^{5}	Rogers Hornsby	2B	St. Louis Cardinals	1915–1937	BBWAA	78.11%	
1944^{5}	Kenesaw Landis	EXEC	—	1920–1944	VC	—^{1}	
1945	Roger Bresnahan	C	New York Giants	1897; 1900–1915	VC	—^{1}	
1945	Dan Brouthers	1B	Buffalo Bisons	1879–1896; 1904	VC	—^{1}	
1945	Fred Clarke	LF	Pittsburgh Pirates	1894–1915	VC	—^{1}	
1945	Jimmy Collins	3B	Boston Red Sox	1895–1908	VC	—^{1}	
1945	Ed Delahanty	LF	Philadelphia Phillies	1888–1903	VC	—^{1}	
1945	Hugh Duffy	CF	Boston Beaneaters	1888–1906	VC	—^{1}	
1945	Hugh Jennings	SS	Baltimore Orioles (NL) (Note: Plaque features a Detroit Tigers logo.)	1891–1918	VC	—^{1}	
1945	King Kelly	RF	Chicago White Stockings	1878–1893	VC	—^{1}	
1945	Jim O'Rourke	LF	New York Giants	1872–1893; 1904	VC	—^{1}	
1945	Wilbert Robinson	MGR	Brooklyn Dodgers	1902; 1914–1931	VC	—^{1}	
1946	Jesse Burkett	LF	Cleveland Spiders	1890–1905	VC	—^{1}	
1946	Frank Chance	1B	Chicago Cubs	1898–1914	VC	—^{1}	
1946	Jack Chesbro	P	New York Highlanders	1899–1909	VC	—^{1}	
1946	Johnny Evers	2B	Chicago Cubs	1902–1917; 1922; 1929	VC	—^{1}	
1946	Clark Griffith	EXEC/PIO	Washington Senators	1891–1914	VC	—^{1}	
1946	Tommy McCarthy	RF	Boston Beaneaters	1884–1896	VC	—^{1}	
1946	Joe McGinnity	P	New York Giants	1899–1908	VC	—^{1}	
1946	Eddie Plank	P	Philadelphia Athletics	1901–1917	VC	—^{1}	
1946	Joe Tinker	SS	Chicago Cubs	1902–1916	VC	—^{1}	
1946	Rube Waddell	P	Philadelphia Athletics	1897; 1899–1910	VC	—^{1}	
1946	Ed Walsh	P	Chicago White Sox	1904–1917	VC	—^{1}	
1947	Mickey Cochrane	C	Philadelphia Athletics	1925–1937	BBWAA	79.5%	
1947	Frankie Frisch	2B	St. Louis Cardinals	1919–1937	BBWAA	84.47%	
1947	Lefty Grove	P	Philadelphia Athletics (Note: Plaque features a Boston Red Sox logo.)	1925–1941	BBWAA	76.4%	
1947	Carl Hubbell	P	New York Giants	1928–1943	BBWAA	86.96%	
1948	Herb Pennock	P	New York Yankees	1912–1934	BBWAA	77.69%	
1948	Pie Traynor	3B	Pittsburgh Pirates	1920–1935; 1937	BBWAA	76.86%	
1949	Mordecai Brown	P	Chicago Cubs	1903–1916	VC	—^{1}	
1949	Charlie Gehringer	2B	Detroit Tigers	1924–1942	BBWAA	85.03%	
1949	Kid Nichols	P	Boston Beaneaters (Note: Plaque features a St. Louis Cardinals logo.)	1890–1901; 1904–1906	VC	—^{1}	
1951	Jimmie Foxx	1B	Philadelphia Athletics	1925–1942; 1944–1945	BBWAA	79.2%	
1951	Mel Ott	RF	New York Giants	1926–1947	BBWAA	87.17%	
1952	Harry Heilmann	RF	Detroit Tigers	1914; 1916–1931	BBWAA	86.75%	
1952	Paul Waner	RF	Pittsburgh Pirates	1926–1945	BBWAA	83.33%	
1953	Ed Barrow	EXEC	New York Yankees	1921–1945	VC	—^{1}	
1953	Chief Bender	P	Philadelphia Athletics	1903–1917; 1925	VC	—^{1}	
1953	Tom Connolly	UMP	—	1898–1931	VC	—^{1}	
1953	Dizzy Dean	P	St. Louis Cardinals	1930; 1932–1941; 1947	BBWAA	79.17%	
1953	Bill Klem	UMP	—	1905–1941	VC	—^{1}	
1953	Al Simmons	LF	Philadelphia Athletics	1924–1941; 1943–1944	BBWAA	75.38%	
1953	Bobby Wallace	SS	St. Louis Browns	1894–1918	VC	—^{1}	
1953	Harry Wright	EXEC	Philadelphia Phillies	1871–1893	VC	—^{1}	
1954	Bill Dickey	C	New York Yankees	1928–1943; 1946	BBWAA	80.16%	
1954	Rabbit Maranville	SS	Boston Braves	1912–1933; 1935	BBWAA	82.94%	
1954	Bill Terry	1B	New York Giants	1923–1936	BBWAA	77.38%	
1955	Frank Baker	3B	Philadelphia Athletics	1908–1914; 1916–1919; 1921–1922	VC	—^{1}	
1955	Joe DiMaggio	CF	New York Yankees	1936–1942; 1946–1951	BBWAA	88.84%	
1955	Gabby Hartnett	C	Chicago Cubs	1922–1941	BBWAA	77.69%	
1955	Ted Lyons	P	Chicago White Sox	1923–1942; 1946	BBWAA	86.45%	
1955	Ray Schalk	C	Chicago White Sox	1912–1929	VC	—^{1}	
1955	Dazzy Vance	P	Brooklyn Dodgers	1915; 1918; 1922–1935	BBWAA	81.67%	
1956	Joe Cronin	SS	Boston Red Sox	1926–1945	BBWAA	78.76%	
1956	Hank Greenberg	1B	Detroit Tigers	1930; 1933–1941; 1945–1947	BBWAA	84.97%	
1957	Sam Crawford	RF	Detroit Tigers	1899–1917	VC	—^{1}	
1957	Joe McCarthy	MGR	New York Yankees	1926–1946; 1948–1950	VC	—^{1}	
1959	Zack Wheat	LF	Brooklyn Dodgers	1909–1927	VC	—^{1}	
1961	Max Carey	CF	Pittsburgh Pirates	1910–1929	VC	—^{1}	
1961	Billy Hamilton	CF	Philadelphia Phillies (Note: Plaque features a Boston Beaneaters logo.)	1888–1901	VC	—^{1}	
1962	Bob Feller	P	Cleveland Indians	1936–1941; 1945–1956	BBWAA	93.75%	
1962	Bill McKechnie	MGR	Cincinnati Reds	1915; 1922–1926; 1928–1946	VC	—^{1}	
1962	Jackie Robinson	2B	Brooklyn Dodgers	1947–1956	BBWAA	77.5%	
1962	Edd Roush	CF	Cincinnati Reds	1913–1929; 1931	VC	—^{1}	
1963	John Clarkson	P	Boston Beaneaters	1882; 1884–1894	VC	—^{1}	
1963	Elmer Flick	RF	Cleveland Indians	1898–1910	VC	—^{1}	
1963	Sam Rice	RF	Washington Senators	1915–1934	VC	—^{1}	
1963	Eppa Rixey	P	Cincinnati Reds	1912–1917; 1919–1933	VC	—^{1}	
1964	Luke Appling	SS	Chicago White Sox	1930–1943; 1945–1950	BBWAA	94.03%	
1964	Red Faber	P	Chicago White Sox	1914–1933	VC	—^{1}	
1964	Burleigh Grimes	P	Brooklyn Dodgers	1916–1934	VC	—^{1}	
1964	Miller Huggins	MGR	New York Yankees	1913–1929	VC	—^{1}	
1964	Tim Keefe	P	New York Giants	1880–1893	VC	—^{1}	
1964	Heinie Manush	LF	Washington Senators	1923–1939	VC	—^{1}	
1964	John Montgomery Ward	SS	New York Giants	1878–1894	VC	—^{1}	
1965	Pud Galvin	P	Buffalo Bisons	1875; 1879–1892	VC	—^{1}	
1966	Casey Stengel	MGR	New York Yankees	1934–1936; 1938–1943; 1946–1960; 1962–1965	VC	—^{1}	
1966	Ted Williams	LF	Boston Red Sox	1939–1942; 1946–1960	BBWAA	93.38%	
1967	Branch Rickey	EXEC	Brooklyn Dodgers	1925–1955	VC	—^{1}	
1967	Red Ruffing	P	New York Yankees	1924–1942; 1945–1947	BBWAA	86.93%	
1967	Lloyd Waner	CF	Pittsburgh Pirates	1927–1942; 1944–1945	VC	—^{1}	
1968	Kiki Cuyler	RF	Chicago Cubs	1921–1938	VC	—^{1}	
1968	Goose Goslin	LF	Washington Senators	1921–1938	VC	—^{1}	
1968	Joe Medwick	LF	St. Louis Cardinals	1932–1948	BBWAA	84.81%	
1969	Roy Campanella	C	Brooklyn Dodgers	1948–1957	BBWAA	79.41%	
1969	Stan Coveleski	P	Cleveland Indians	1912; 1916–1928	VC	—^{1}	
1969	Waite Hoyt	P	New York Yankees	1918–1938	VC	—^{1}	
1969	Stan Musial	LF	St. Louis Cardinals	1941–1944; 1946–1963	BBWAA	93.24%	
1970	Lou Boudreau	SS	Cleveland Indians	1938–1952	BBWAA	77.33%	
1970	Earle Combs	CF	New York Yankees	1924–1935	VC	—^{1}	
1970	Ford Frick	EXEC	—	1934–1951; 1951–1965^{3}	VC	—^{1}	
1970	Jesse Haines	P	St. Louis Cardinals	1918; 1920–1937	VC	—^{1}	
1971	Dave Bancroft	SS	Philadelphia Phillies	1915–1930	VC	—^{1}	
1971	Jake Beckley	1B	Pittsburgh Pirates	1888–1907	VC	—^{1}	
1971	Chick Hafey	LF	St. Louis Cardinals	1924–1935; 1937	VC	—^{1}	
1971	Harry Hooper	RF	Boston Red Sox	1909–1925	VC	—^{1}	
1971	Joe Kelley	LF	Baltimore Orioles (NL)	1891–1906; 1908	VC	—^{1}	
1971	Rube Marquard	P	New York Giants	1908–1925	VC	—^{1}	
1971	Satchel Paige	P	Kansas City Monarchs	1927–1953; 1955; 1965	NLC	—^{1}	
1971	George Weiss	EXEC	New York Yankees	1947–1966	VC	—^{1}	
1972	Yogi Berra	C	New York Yankees	1946–1963; 1965	BBWAA	85.61%	
1972	Josh Gibson	C	Homestead Grays	1930–1946	NLC	100%	
1972	Lefty Gomez	P	New York Yankees	1930–1943	VC	—^{1}	
1972	Will Harridge	EXEC	—	1909–1925	VC	—^{1}	
1972	Sandy Koufax	P	Los Angeles Dodgers	1955–1966	BBWAA	86.87%	
1972	Buck Leonard	1B	Homestead Grays	1933–1950	NLC	77.78%	
1972	Early Wynn	P	Cleveland Indians	1939; 1941–1944; 1946–1963	BBWAA	76.01%	
1972	Ross Youngs	RF	New York Giants	1917–1926	VC	—^{1}	
1973	Roberto Clemente	RF	Pittsburgh Pirates	1955–1972	BBWAA	92.69%	
1973	Billy Evans	UMP	—	1906–1927	VC	—^{1}	
1973	Monte Irvin	LF	Newark Eagles	1937–1942; 1945–1956	NLC	75%	
1973	George Kelly	1B	New York Giants	1915–1917; 1919–1930; 1932	VC	—^{1}	
1973	Warren Spahn	P	Milwaukee Braves	1942; 1946–1965	BBWAA	82.89%	
1973	Mickey Welch	P	New York Giants	1880–1892	VC	—^{1}	
1974	Cool Papa Bell	CF	St. Louis Stars	1922–1938; 1942; 1947–1950	NLC	100%	
1974	Jim Bottomley	1B	St. Louis Cardinals	1922–1937	VC	—^{1}	
1974	Jocko Conlan	UMP	—	1941–1965	VC	—^{1}	
1974	Whitey Ford	P	New York Yankees	1950; 1953–1967	BBWAA	77.81%	
1974	Mickey Mantle	CF	New York Yankees	1951–1968	BBWAA	88.22%	
1974	Sam Thompson	RF	Philadelphia Phillies	1885–1898; 1908	VC	—^{1}	
1975	Earl Averill	CF	Cleveland Indians	1930–1941	VC	—^{1}	
1975	Bucky Harris	MGR	Washington Senators	1924–1943; 1947–1948; 1950–1956	VC	—^{1}	
1975	Billy Herman	2B	Chicago Cubs	1931–1943; 1946–1947	VC	—^{1}	
1975	Judy Johnson	3B	Hilldale Daisies	1918–1937	NLC	—^{1}	
1975	Ralph Kiner	LF	Pittsburgh Pirates	1946–1955	BBWAA	75.41%	
1976	Oscar Charleston	CF	Pittsburgh Crawfords	1915–1950; 1954	NLC	—^{1}	
1976	Roger Connor	1B	New York Giants	1880–1897	VC	—^{1}	
1976	Cal Hubbard	UMP	—	1936–1951	VC	—^{1}	
1976	Bob Lemon	P	Cleveland Indians	1941–1942, 1946–1958	BBWAA	78.61%	
1976	Freddie Lindstrom	3B	New York Giants	1924–1935	VC	—^{1}	
1976	Robin Roberts	P	Philadelphia Phillies	1948–1966	BBWAA	86.86%	
1977	Ernie Banks	SS	Chicago Cubs	1953–1971	BBWAA	83.81%	
1977	Martín Dihigo	P	Cuban Stars (East)	1923–1931; 1935–1936; 1945	NLC	87.5%	
1977	Pop Lloyd	SS	New York Lincoln Giants	1906–1932	NLC	87.5%	
1977	Al López	MGR	Chicago White Sox (Note: Plaque features a Cleveland Indians logo.)	1951–1965; 1968–1969	VC	—^{1}	
1977	Amos Rusie	P	New York Giants	1889–1895; 1897–1898; 1901	VC	—^{1}	
1977	Joe Sewell	SS	Cleveland Indians	1920–1933	VC	—^{1}	
1978	Addie Joss	P	Cleveland Indians	1902–1910	VC	—^{1}	
1978	Larry MacPhail	EXEC	—	1933–1942; 1945–1947	VC	—^{1}	
1978	Eddie Mathews	3B	Milwaukee Braves	1952–1968	BBWAA	79.42%	
1979	Warren Giles	EXEC	Cincinnati Reds	1937–1951; 1951–1969	VC	—^{1}	
1979	Willie Mays	CF	San Francisco Giants	1951–1952; 1954–1973	BBWAA	94.68%	
1979	Hack Wilson	CF	Chicago Cubs	1923–1934	VC	—^{1}	
1980	Al Kaline	RF	Detroit Tigers	1953–1974	BBWAA	88.31%	
1980	Chuck Klein	RF	Philadelphia Phillies	1928–1944	VC	—^{1}	
1980	Duke Snider	CF	Brooklyn Dodgers	1947–1964	BBWAA	86.49%	
1980	Tom Yawkey	EXEC	Boston Red Sox	1933–1976	VC	—^{1}	
1981	Rube Foster	EXEC	Chicago American Giants	1902–1926	VC	—^{1}	
1981	Bob Gibson	P	St. Louis Cardinals	1959–1975	BBWAA	84.04%	
1981	Johnny Mize	1B	St. Louis Cardinals	1936–1942; 1946–1953	VC	—^{1}	
1982	Hank Aaron	RF	Milwaukee Braves (Note: Plaque features an Atlanta Braves logo.)	1954–1976	BBWAA	97.83%	
1982	Happy Chandler	EXEC	—	1945–1951	VC	—^{1}	
1982	Travis Jackson	SS	New York Giants	1922–1936	VC	—^{1}	
1982	Frank Robinson	RF	Cincinnati Reds (Note: Plaque features a Baltimore Orioles logo.)	1956–1976	BBWAA	89.16%	
1983	Walter Alston	MGR	Los Angeles Dodgers	1954–1976	VC	—^{1}	
1983	George Kell	3B	Detroit Tigers	1943–1957	VC	—^{1}	
1983	Juan Marichal	P	San Francisco Giants	1960–1975	BBWAA	83.69%	
1983	Brooks Robinson	3B	Baltimore Orioles	1955–1977	BBWAA	91.98%	
1984	Luis Aparicio	SS	Chicago White Sox	1956–1973	BBWAA	84.62%	
1984	Don Drysdale	P	Los Angeles Dodgers	1956–1969	BBWAA	78.41%	
1984	Rick Ferrell	C	Boston Red Sox	1929–1945; 1947	VC	—^{1}	
1984	Harmon Killebrew	1B	Minnesota Twins	1954–1975	BBWAA	83.13%	
1984	Pee Wee Reese	SS	Brooklyn Dodgers	1940–1942; 1946–1958	VC	—^{1}	
1985	Lou Brock	LF	St. Louis Cardinals	1961–1979	BBWAA	79.75%	
1985	Enos Slaughter	RF	St. Louis Cardinals	1938–1942; 1946–1959	VC	—^{1}	
1985	Arky Vaughan	SS	Pittsburgh Pirates	1932–1943; 1947–1948	VC	—^{1}	
1985	Hoyt Wilhelm	P	Chicago White Sox (Note: Plaque features a New York Giants logo.)	1952–1972	BBWAA	83.8%	
1986	Bobby Doerr	2B	Boston Red Sox	1937–1944; 1946–1951	VC	—^{1}	
1986	Ernie Lombardi	C	Cincinnati Reds	1931–1947	VC	—^{1}	
1986	Willie McCovey	1B	San Francisco Giants	1959–1980	BBWAA	81.41%	
1987	Ray Dandridge	3B	Newark Eagles	1933–1939; 1942; 1944; 1949	VC	—^{1}	
1987	Catfish Hunter	P	Oakland Athletics (Note: Plaque does not have a team logo.)	1965–1979	BBWAA	76.27%	
1987	Billy Williams	LF	Chicago Cubs	1959–1976	BBWAA	85.71%	
1988	Willie Stargell	LF	Pittsburgh Pirates	1962–1982	BBWAA	82.44%	
1989	Al Barlick	UMP	—	1940–1943; 1946–1955; 1958–1971	VC	—^{1}	
1989	Johnny Bench	C	Cincinnati Reds	1967–1983	BBWAA	96.42%	
1989	Red Schoendienst	2B	St. Louis Cardinals	1945–1963	VC	—^{1}	
1989	Carl Yastrzemski	LF	Boston Red Sox	1961–1983	BBWAA	94.63%	
1990	Joe Morgan	2B	Cincinnati Reds	1963–1984	BBWAA	81.76%	
1990	Jim Palmer	P	Baltimore Orioles	1965-1967; 1969–1984	BBWAA	92.57%	
1991	Rod Carew	2B	Minnesota Twins	1967–1985	BBWAA	90.52%	
1991	Ferguson Jenkins	P	Chicago Cubs	1965–1983	BBWAA	75.4%	
1991	Tony Lazzeri	2B	New York Yankees	1926–1939	VC	—^{1}	
1991	Gaylord Perry	P	San Francisco Giants	1962–1983	BBWAA	77.2%	
1991	Bill Veeck	EXEC	Chicago White Sox	1946–1949; 1951–1953; 1959–1961; 1975–1980	VC	—^{1}	
1992	Rollie Fingers	P	Oakland Athletics	1968–1982; 1984–1985	BBWAA	81.16%	
1992	Bill McGowan	UMP	—	1925–1954	VC	—^{1}	
1992	Hal Newhouser	P	Detroit Tigers	1939–1955	VC	—^{1}	
1992	Tom Seaver	P	New York Mets	1967–1986	BBWAA	98.84%	
1993	Reggie Jackson	RF	Oakland Athletics (Note: Plaque features a New York Yankees logo.)	1967–1987	BBWAA	93.62%	
1994	Steve Carlton	P	Philadelphia Phillies	1965–1988	BBWAA	95.82%	
1994	Leo Durocher	MGR	Brooklyn Dodgers	1939–1946; 1948–1955; 1966–1973	VC	—^{1}	
1994	Phil Rizzuto	SS	New York Yankees	1941–1942; 1946–1956	VC	—^{1}	
1995	Richie Ashburn	CF	Philadelphia Phillies	1948–1962	VC	—^{1}	
1995	Leon Day	P	Newark Eagles	1934–1939; 1941–1943; 1946; 1949–1950	VC	—^{1}	
1995	William Hulbert	EXEC	—	1876–1882	VC	—^{1}	
1995	Mike Schmidt	3B	Philadelphia Phillies	1972–1989	BBWAA	96.52%	
1995	Vic Willis	P	Boston Braves	1898–1910	VC	—^{1}	
1996	Jim Bunning	P	Detroit Tigers (Note: Plaque features a Philadelphia Phillies logo.)	1955–1971	VC	—^{1}	
1996	Bill Foster	P	Chicago American Giants	1923–1938	VC	—^{1}	
1996	Ned Hanlon	MGR	Baltimore Orioles (NL)	1889–1890; 1892–1907	VC	—^{1}	
1996	Earl Weaver	MGR	Baltimore Orioles	1968–1982; 1985–1986	VC	—^{1}	
1997	Nellie Fox	2B	Chicago White Sox	1947–1965	VC	—^{1}	
1997	Tommy Lasorda	MGR	Los Angeles Dodgers	1976–1996	VC	—^{1}	
1997	Phil Niekro	P	Atlanta Braves	1964–1987	BBWAA	80.34%	
1997	Willie Wells	SS	St. Louis Stars	1923; 1924–1936; 1942; 1944–1948	VC	—^{1}	
1998	George Davis	SS	New York Giants	1890–1909	VC	—^{1}	
1998	Larry Doby	CF	Cleveland Indians	1942–1943; 1946–1959	VC	—^{1}	
1998	Lee MacPhail	EXEC	—	1958–1984	VC	—^{1}	
1998	Bullet Rogan	P	Kansas City Monarchs	1917; 1920–1938	VC	—^{1}	
1998	Don Sutton	P	Los Angeles Dodgers	1966–1988	BBWAA	81.61%	
1999	George Brett	3B	Kansas City Royals	1973–1993	BBWAA	98.19%	
1999	Orlando Cepeda	1B	San Francisco Giants	1958–1974	VC	—^{1}	
1999	Nestor Chylak	UMP	—	1954–1978	VC	—^{1}	
1999	Nolan Ryan	P	California Angels (Note: Plaque features a Texas Rangers logo.)	1966; 1968–1993	BBWAA	98.79%	
1999	Frank Selee	MGR	Boston Beaneaters	1890; 1892–1905	VC	—^{1}	
1999	Joe Williams	P	New York Lincoln Giants	1910–1932	VC	—^{1}	
1999	Robin Yount	SS	Milwaukee Brewers	1974–1993	BBWAA	77.46%	
2000	Sparky Anderson	MGR	Detroit Tigers (Note: Plaque features a Cincinnati Reds logo.)	1970–1995	VC	—^{1}	
2000	Carlton Fisk	C	Chicago White Sox	1969; 1971–1993	BBWAA	79.56%	
2000	Bid McPhee	2B	Cincinnati Red Stockings	1882–1899	VC	—^{1}	
2000	Tony Pérez	1B	Cincinnati Reds	1964–1986	BBWAA	77.15%	
2000	Turkey Stearnes	CF	Detroit Stars	1920–1942; 1945	VC	—^{1}	
2001	Bill Mazeroski	2B	Pittsburgh Pirates	1956–1972	VC	—^{1}	
2001	Kirby Puckett	CF	Minnesota Twins	1984–1995	BBWAA	82.14%	
2001	Hilton Smith	P	Kansas City Monarchs	1932–1948	VC	—^{1}	
2001	Dave Winfield	RF	New York Yankees (Note: Plaque features a San Diego Padres logo.)	1973–1995	BBWAA	84.47%	
2002	Ozzie Smith	SS	St. Louis Cardinals	1978–1996	BBWAA	91.74%	
2003	Gary Carter	C	Montreal Expos	1974–1992	BBWAA	78.02%	
2003	Eddie Murray	1B	Baltimore Orioles	1977–1997	BBWAA	85.28%	
2004	Dennis Eckersley	P	Oakland Athletics	1975–1998	BBWAA	83.2%	
2004	Paul Molitor	3B	Milwaukee Brewers	1978–1998	BBWAA	85.18%	
2005	Wade Boggs	3B	Boston Red Sox	1982–1999	BBWAA	91.86%	
2005	Ryne Sandberg	2B	Chicago Cubs	1981–1994; 1996–1997	BBWAA	76.16%	
2006	Ray Brown	P	Homestead Grays	1931–1945	SCNL	—^{2}	
2006	Willard Brown	CF	Kansas City Monarchs	1935–1950	SCNL	—^{2}	
2006	Andy Cooper	P	Kansas City Monarchs	1920–1941	SCNL	—^{2}	
2006	Frank Grant	EXEC	Cuban Giants	1886–1903	SCNL	—^{2}	
2006	Pete Hill	CF	Chicago American Giants	1899–1926	SCNL	—^{2}	
2006	Biz Mackey	C	Hilldale Giants	1920–1947	SCNL	—^{2}	
2006	Effa Manley	EXEC	Newark Eagles	1935–1948	SCNL	—^{2}	
2006	José Méndez	P	Cuban Stars	1908–1926	SCNL	—^{2}	
2006	Alex Pompez	EXEC	New York Cubans	1916–1950	SCNL	—^{2}	
2006	Cum Posey	EXEC	Homestead Grays	1920–1946	SCNL	—^{2}	
2006	Louis Santop	C	Hilldale Daisies	1909–1926	SCNL	—^{2}	
2006	Bruce Sutter	P	Chicago Cubs	1976–1988	BBWAA	76.92%	
2006	Mule Suttles	1B	Newark Eagles	1921; 1923–1944	SCNL	—^{2}	
2006	Ben Taylor	1B	Indianapolis ABCs	1908–1929	SCNL	—^{2}	
2006	Cristóbal Torriente	CF	Chicago American Giants	1913–1928	SCNL	—^{2}	
2006	Sol White	EXEC	Philadelphia Giants	—	SCNL	—^{2}	
2006	J. L. Wilkinson	EXEC	Kansas City Monarchs	1912–1948	SCNL	—^{2}	
2006	Jud Wilson	3B	Philadelphia Stars	1922–1945	SCNL	—^{2}	
2007	Tony Gwynn	RF	San Diego Padres	1982–2001	BBWAA	97.61%	
2007	Cal Ripken Jr.	SS	Baltimore Orioles	1981–2001	BBWAA	98.53%	
2008	Barney Dreyfuss	EXEC/PIO	Pittsburgh Pirates	1899–1932	VC	83.33%	
2008	Rich Gossage	P	New York Yankees	1972–1989; 1991–1994	BBWAA	85.82%	
2008	Bowie Kuhn	EXEC	—	1969–1984	VC	83.33%	
2008	Walter O'Malley	EXEC	Los Angeles Dodgers	1950–1979	VC	75%	
2008	Billy Southworth	MGR	St. Louis Cardinals	1929; 1940–1951	VC	81.25%	
2008	Dick Williams	MGR	Montreal Expos (Note: Plaque features an Oakland Athletics logo.)	1967–1969; 1971–1988	VC	81.25%	
2009	Joe Gordon	2B	New York Yankees	1938–1950	VC	83.33%	
2009	Rickey Henderson	LF	Oakland Athletics	1979–2003	BBWAA	94.81%	
2009	Jim Rice	LF	Boston Red Sox	1974–1989	BBWAA	76.44%	
2010	Andre Dawson	RF	Montreal Expos	1976–1996	BBWAA	77.9%	
2010	Doug Harvey	UMP	—	1962–1992	VC	93.75%	
2010	Whitey Herzog	MGR	St. Louis Cardinals	1973–1990	VC	87.5%	
2011	Roberto Alomar	2B	Toronto Blue Jays	1988–2004	BBWAA	90.01%	
2011	Bert Blyleven	P	Minnesota Twins	1970–1992	BBWAA	79.69%	
2011	Pat Gillick	EXEC	Toronto Blue Jays	1978–2008	VC (EE)	81.25%	
2012	Barry Larkin	SS	Cincinnati Reds	1986–2004	BBWAA	86.39%	
2012	Ron Santo	3B	Chicago Cubs	1960–1974	VC (GE)	93.75%	
2013	Hank O'Day	UMP	—	1895–1927	VC (PI)	93.75%	
2013	Jacob Ruppert	EXEC	New York Yankees	1915–1938	VC (PI)	93.75%	
2013	Deacon White	3B	Buffalo Bisons	1871–1890	VC (PI)	87.5%	
2014	Bobby Cox	MGR	Atlanta Braves	1978–2010	VC (EE)	100%	
2014	Tom Glavine	P	Atlanta Braves	1987–2008	BBWAA	91.94%	
2014	Tony La Russa	MGR	St. Louis Cardinals	1979–2011; 2021–2022	VC (EE)	100%	
2014	Greg Maddux	P	Atlanta Braves	1986–2008	BBWAA	97.2%	
2014	Frank Thomas	1B	Chicago White Sox	1990–2008	BBWAA	83.71%	
2014	Joe Torre	MGR	New York Yankees	1977–2010	VC (EE)	100%	
2015	Craig Biggio	2B	Houston Astros	1988–2007	BBWAA	82.7%	
2015	Randy Johnson	P	Seattle Mariners (Note: Plaque features an Arizona Diamondbacks logo.)	1988–2009	BBWAA	97.27%	
2015	Pedro Martinez	P	Boston Red Sox	1992–2009	BBWAA	91.07%	
2015	John Smoltz	P	Atlanta Braves	1988–2009	BBWAA	82.88%	
2016	Ken Griffey Jr.	CF	Seattle Mariners	1989–2010	BBWAA	99.32%	
2016	Mike Piazza	C	New York Mets	1992–2007	BBWAA	82.95%	
2017	Jeff Bagwell	1B	Houston Astros	1991–2005	BBWAA	86.2%	
2017	Tim Raines	LF	Montreal Expos	1979–2002	BBWAA	85.97%	
2017	Iván Rodríguez	C	Texas Rangers	1991–2011	BBWAA	76.02%	
2017	John Schuerholz	EXEC	Atlanta Braves	1966–present	VC (TG)	100%	
2017	Bud Selig	EXEC	—	1992–2015	VC (TG)	93.75%	
2018	Vladimir Guerrero	RF	Montreal Expos (Note: Plaque features a Los Angeles Angels of Anaheim logo.)	1996–2011	BBWAA	92.89%	
2018	Trevor Hoffman	P	San Diego Padres	1993–2010	BBWAA	79.86%	
2018	Chipper Jones	3B	Atlanta Braves	1993; 1995–2012	BBWAA	97.16%	
2018	Jack Morris	P	Detroit Tigers	1977–1994	VC (MB)	87.5%	
2018	Jim Thome	1B	Cleveland Indians	1991–2012	BBWAA	89.81%	
2018	Alan Trammell	SS	Detroit Tigers	1977–1996	VC (MB)	81.25%	
2019	Harold Baines	DH	Chicago White Sox	1980–2001	VC (TG)	75%	
2019	Roy Halladay	P	Toronto Blue Jays	1998–2013	BBWAA	85.41%	
2019	Edgar Martínez	DH	Seattle Mariners	1987–2004	BBWAA	85.41%	
2019	Mike Mussina	P	Baltimore Orioles	1991–2008	BBWAA	76.71%	
2019	Mariano Rivera	P	New York Yankees	1995–2013	BBWAA	100%	
2019	Lee Smith	P	Chicago Cubs	1980–1997	VC (TG)	100%	
2020^{6}	Derek Jeter	SS	New York Yankees	1995–2014	BBWAA	99.75%	
2020^{6}	Marvin Miller	EXEC	—	1966–1982	VC (MB)	75%	
2020^{6}	Ted Simmons	C	St. Louis Cardinals	1968–1988	VC (MB)	81.25%	
2020^{6}	Larry Walker	RF	Colorado Rockies	1989–2005	BBWAA	76.57%	
2022	Bud Fowler	EXEC	—	1878–1898	VC (EB)	75%	
2022	Gil Hodges	1B	Brooklyn Dodgers	1943; 1947–1963	VC (GD)	75%	
2022	Jim Kaat	P	Minnesota Twins	1959–1983	VC (GD)	75%	
2022	Minnie Miñoso	LF	Chicago White Sox	1946–1980	VC (GD)	87.5%	
2022	Tony Oliva	RF	Minnesota Twins	1962–1976	VC (GD)	75%	
2022	Buck O'Neil	EXEC	Kansas City Monarchs	1937–1948	VC (EB)	81.25%	
2022	David Ortiz	DH	Boston Red Sox	1997–2016	BBWAA	77.92%	
2023	Fred McGriff	1B	Atlanta Braves	1986–2004	VC (COB)	100%	
2023	Scott Rolen	3B	Philadelphia Phillies	1996–2012	BBWAA	76.35%	
2024	Adrián Beltré	3B	Texas Rangers	1998–2018	BBWAA	95.06%	
2024	Todd Helton	1B	Colorado Rockies	1997–2013	BBWAA	79.74%	
2024	Jim Leyland	MGR	Pittsburgh Pirates	1986–1999; 2006–2013	VC (COB)	93.75%	
2024	Joe Mauer	C	Minnesota Twins	2004–2018	BBWAA	76.1%	
2025	Dick Allen	1B	Philadelphia Phillies	1963–1977	VC (CLB)	81.25%	
2025	Dave Parker	RF	Pittsburgh Pirates	1973–1991	VC (CLB)	87.5%	
2025	CC Sabathia	P	New York Yankees	2001–2019	BBWAA	86.8%	
2025	Ichiro Suzuki	RF	Seattle Mariners	2001–2019	BBWAA	99.75%	
2025	Billy Wagner	P	Houston Astros	1995–2010	BBWAA	82.49%	
2026	Carlos Beltrán	CF	New York Mets	1998–2017	BBWAA	84.24%	
2026	Andruw Jones	CF	Atlanta Braves	1996–2012	BBWAA	78.35%	
2026	Jeff Kent	2B	San Francisco Giants	1992–2008	VC (COB)	87.5%	

== Notes ==
- Prior to the 2001 re-organization of the Veterans Committee, the percentage of the vote generally was not released for candidates selected by the committee.
- Percentage of the vote was not released for candidates approved by the Committee on African American Baseball (2006).
- Ford Frick's two tenures as an executive included his stints as the president of the National League (1934–1951) and Commissioner of Baseball (1951–1965).
- Lou Gehrig was elected by acclamation at the December 1939 winter meetings of the BBWAA.
- There were no regular elections in 1940, 1941, 1943, and 1944, as the Hall decided to hold elections every three years as opposed to annually. Landis was elected in a special election shortly after his death in November 1944. Annual elections resumed in 1946, one year after the end of World War II.
- There was no event in 2020 because of the COVID-19 pandemic and concerns over the members of the Hall who were able to attend the event. The extended Class of 2021 features those elected in December 2019 (veterans' committee), January 2020 (BBWAA), and January 2021 (BBWAA). The planned December 2020 Veterans Committee elections, in the Golden Age and Early Baseball Eras, were postponed until December 2021.

Cap logos

== See also ==
- Baseball Hall of Fame balloting, by year
- List of members of the Mexican Professional Baseball Hall of Fame
- List of members of the Cuban Baseball Hall of Fame
- List of members of the Japanese Baseball Hall of Fame
