= 1961 Baseball Hall of Fame balloting =

Elections to the Baseball Hall of Fame

National Baseball

Hall of Fame and Museum
- New inductees: 2
- via Veterans Committee: 2
- Total inductees: 86
- Induction date: July 24, 1961

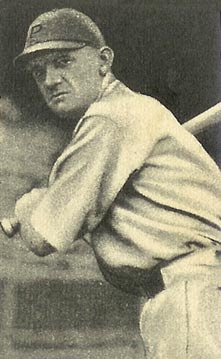
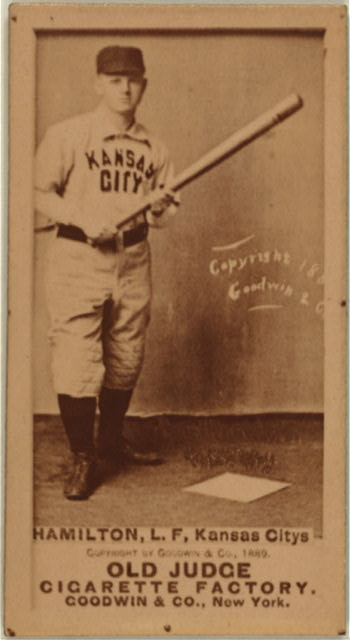
1961 inductees Max Carey (left) and Billy Hamilton

Elections to the Baseball Hall of Fame for 1961 followed a system established after the 1956 election. The baseball writers would vote on recent players only in even-number years (until 1967).

The Veterans Committee met in closed sessions to consider executives, managers, umpires, and earlier major league players. It selected two center fielders and talented baserunners, Max Carey and Billy Hamilton. A formal induction ceremony was held in Cooperstown, New York, on July 24, 1961, with Commissioner of Baseball Ford Frick presiding.
