= 1975 Baseball Hall of Fame balloting =

Elections to the Baseball Hall of Fame

National Baseball

Hall of Fame and Museum
- New inductees: 5
- via BBWAA: 1
- via Veterans Committee: 3
- via Negro Leagues Committee: 1
- Total inductees: 151
- Induction date: August 18, 1975

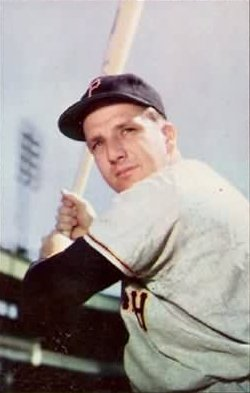
1975 BBWAA inductee Ralph Kiner

Elections to the Baseball Hall of Fame for 1975 followed the system in place since 1971. The Baseball Writers' Association of America (BBWAA) voted by mail to select from recent major league players and elected Ralph Kiner. The Veterans Committee met in closed sessions to consider executives, managers, umpires, and earlier major league players. It selected three people: Earl Averill, Bucky Harris, and Billy Herman. The Negro Leagues Committee also met in person and selected Judy Johnson. A formal induction ceremony was held in Cooperstown, New York, on August 18, 1975, with Commissioner of Baseball Bowie Kuhn presiding.

== BBWAA election ==
The BBWAA was authorized to elect players active in 1955 or later, but not after 1969; the ballot included candidates from the 1974 ballot who received at least 5% of the vote but were not elected, along with selected players, chosen by a screening committee, whose last appearance was in 1969. All 10-year members of the BBWAA were eligible to vote.

Voters were instructed to cast votes for up to 10 candidates; any candidate receiving votes on at least 75% of the ballots would be honored with induction to the Hall. The ballot consisted of 37 players; a total of 362 ballots were cast, with 272 votes required for election. A total of 2,870 individual votes were cast, an average of 7.93 per ballot.

Candidates who were eligible for the first time are indicated here with a dagger (†). The one candidate who received at least 75% of the vote and was elected is indicated in bold italics; candidates who have since been elected in subsequent elections are indicated in italics.

Ralph Kiner, Hal Newhouser, Phil Cavarretta, Johnny Sain and Vic Raschi were on the ballot for the last time. Kiner was elected by a one-vote margin in his final year of eligibility after playing only 10 years in the major leagues, the minimum required for a player to be eligible for the Hall of Fame. Although he had a .279 career batting average, he hit 369 home runs and was the home run leader or co-leader in the National League for seven consecutive seasons; he was also a six-time All-Star and finished 10th or better in National League MVP voting five times.

Player	Votes	Percent	Change
**Ralph Kiner**	273	75.4	▲16.5%
Robin Roberts	263	72.7	▲11.3%
Bob Lemon	233	64.4	▲12.3%
Gil Hodges	188	51.9	▼2.3%
Enos Slaughter	177	48.9	▲9.2%
Hal Newhouser	155	42.8	▲22.8%
Pee Wee Reese	154	42.5	▲3.9%
Eddie Mathews	148	40.9	▲8.6%
Phil Cavarretta	129	35.6	▲18.9%
Duke Snider	129	35.6	▲5.2%
Johnny Sain	123	34.0	▲20.0%
Phil Rizzuto	117	32.3	▲1.9%
George Kell	114	31.5	▲5.7%
Red Schoendienst	94	26.0	▼4.1%
Richie Ashburn	76	21.0	▲5.7%
Don Drysdale†	76	21.0	-
Nellie Fox	76	21.0	▼0.6%
Roger Maris	70	19.3	▼2.1%
Alvin Dark	48	13.3	▼1.5%
Vic Raschi	37	10.2	▲9.4%
Ted Kluszewski	33	9.1	▲1.4%
Elston Howard	23	6.4	▲1.2%
Don Larsen	23	6.4	▼1.5%
Mickey Vernon	22	6.1	▼1.3%
Walker Cooper	13	3.6	▲1.1%
Lew Burdette	11	3.0	▲1.1%
Don Newcombe	11	3.0	▲1.1%
Bobby Thomson	10	2.8	▲1.2%
Ken Boyer†	9	2.5	-
Harvey Haddix	8	2.2	-
Bill White†	7	1.9	-
Vern Law	6	1.7	▲0.3%
Vic Wertz	5	1.4	▲0.9%
Dick Groat	4	1.1	-
Johnny Podres†	3	0.8	-
Rocky Colavito	1	0.3	▼0.2%
Bill Virdon	1	0.3	▼0.5%

Key to colors
Elected to the Hall. These individuals are also indicated in **bold italics**.
Players who were elected in future elections. These individuals are also indicated in plain italics.
Players not yet elected who returned on the 1976 ballot.
Eliminated from future BBWAA voting. These individuals remain eligible for future Veterans Committee consideration.

The newly eligible players included 10 All-Stars, 6 of whom were not included on the ballot, representing a total of 53 All-Star selections. Among the new candidates were 11-time All-Star Ken Boyer, 9-time All-Star Don Drysdale, 8-time All-Star Bill White, 6-time All-Star Roy Face and 5-time All-Star Turk Farrell.

Players eligible for the first time who were not included on the ballot were: Rubén Amaro Sr., Gary Bell, Roy Face, Turk Farrell, Jack Fisher, Julio Gotay, Woodie Held, Bill Henry, Al Jackson, Gene Oliver, Phil Ortega, Jim Pagliaroni, Charley Smith, Dick Stuart, Leon Wagner, Dave Wickersham and Al Worthington.

== J. G. Taylor Spink Award ==
John Carmichael (1902–1986) and James Isaminger (1880–1946) received the J. G. Taylor Spink Award honoring baseball writers. The awards were voted at the December 1974 meeting of the BBWAA, and included in the summer 1975 ceremonies.
