= 1947 Baseball Hall of Fame balloting =

Elections to the Baseball Hall of Fame

National Baseball

Hall of Fame and Museum
- New inductees: 4
- via BBWAA: 4
- Total inductees: 53
- Induction date: July 21, 1947

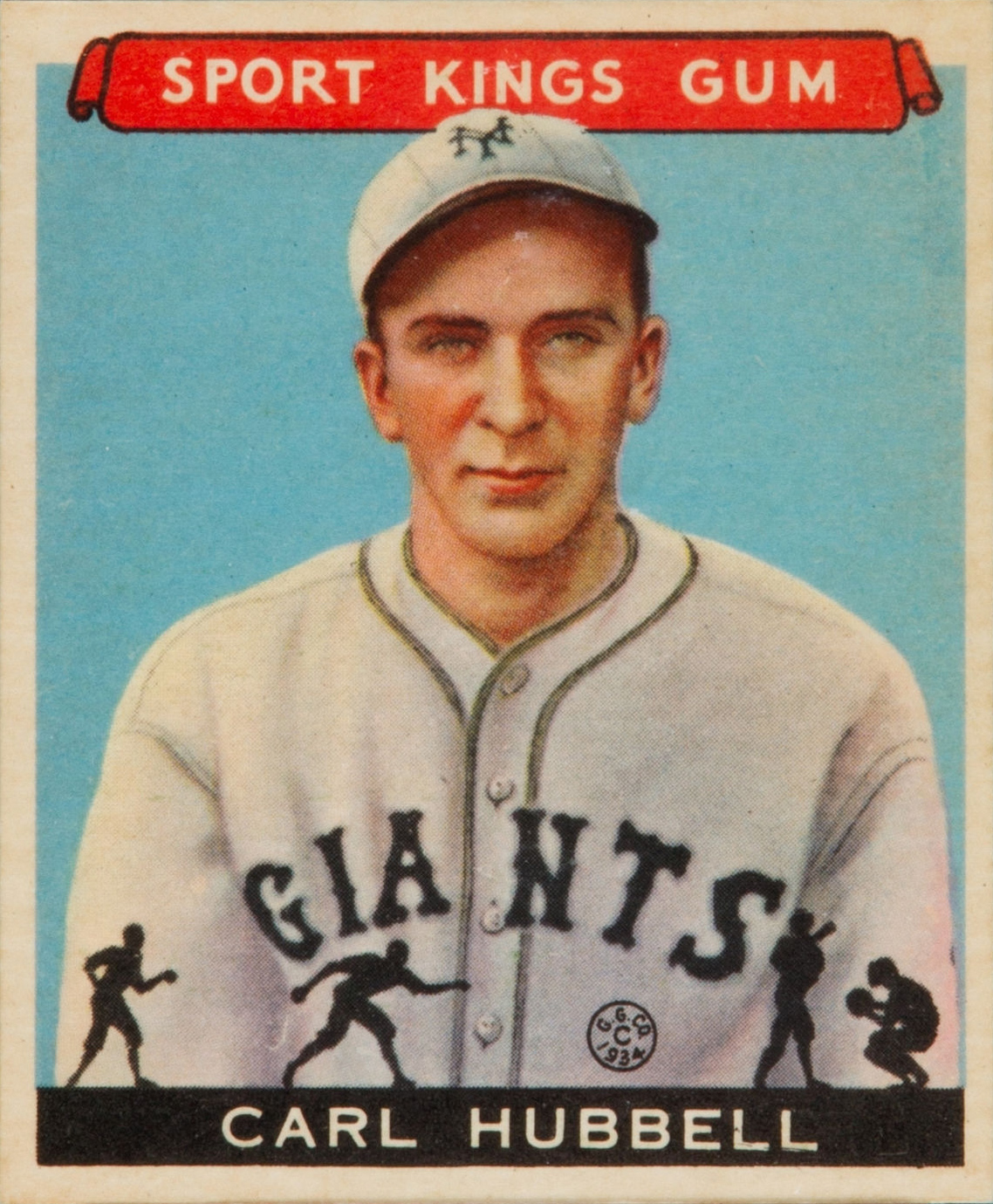
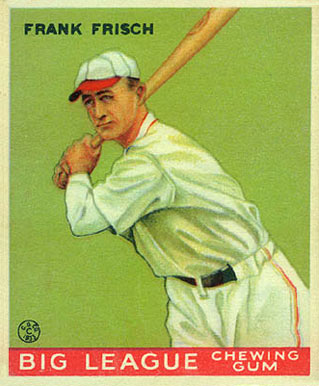
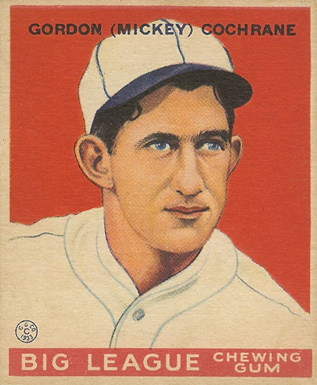
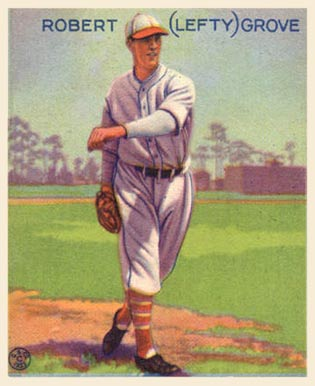
1947 inductees (L-R): Carl Hubbell, Frankie Frisch, Mickey Cochrane, and Lefty Grove

Elections to the Baseball Hall of Fame for 1947 followed yet another round of reform. The Baseball Writers' Association of America (BBWAA) continued to vote by mail but the Hall of Fame Committee had revised the procedures for that election and reduced its historical jurisdiction relative to the Old-Timers Committee. The BBWAA now considered major league players retired no more than 25 years. The reform seemed to work, as it elected four: Mickey Cochrane, Frank Frisch, Lefty Grove, and Carl Hubbell.

In the wake of the successful BBWAA election, and perhaps in deference to those critics who believed that the 21 selections by the Old-Timers Committee in the previous two years had been too many in such a short time, the Hall of Fame Committee did not meet in 1947 to make further selections from among the players of the era before 1922, or to add names to the Roll of Honor. It was believed, with some optimism, that further revisions in the election process were currently unnecessary.

The new members of the Hall were formally inducted in Cooperstown, New York, on July 21, 1947, along with the previous year's 11 selections by the Old-Timers Committee, with National League president Ford Frick presiding. Ed Walsh, elected in 1946, was the only inductee to attend the ceremony; all four 1947 inductees were still living, as were four of the 1946 selectees.

== Reform ==
After the January 1946 BBWAA election failed to elect any inductees, capping a seven-year period in which only one player had been elected, the Hall of Fame Committee concluded that the wide field of candidates from 1900 to the present was making it impossible for any single candidate to gain votes on 75% of all ballots. In response, the Committee selected at its April 1946 meeting eleven inductees, including most of the popular candidates from the era between 1900 and 1918; there was even some support on the committee for removing the BBWAA from the selection process entirely. There was a great deal of criticism regarding the committee's decision in this regard, as they had been understood to only have the capacity to select players from the 19th century; many observers believed the committee was infringing upon the BBWAA's jurisdiction over players of the 20th century.

The committee met again in December 1946, and formally revealed its previously unannounced decision that the jurisdictions of the BBWAA would no longer be defined by the fixed year 1900 receding into the past but by a fixed length of time from the present day, initially set at 25 years. Players who retired more than 25 years ago would be considered only by the Old-Timers Committee.

== BBWAA election ==
=== Eligibility revisions ===
The committee also revised the two-stage method by which the BBWAA election had been conducted in 1946. That year's election, which saw every candidate do less well on the final ballot than on the nominating ballot, led to the initial vote again becoming the main election. Whereas the 1946 system required a second ballot before electing a candidate, now a second runoff election featuring the top 20 candidates, with the potential to select no more than one player, would be held only if no candidate received votes from 75% of the writers in the first election. There was also no longer any minimum number of ballots required to make the election valid.

The Hall of Fame Committee also instituted a change in the rules regarding eligibility of voters. Previously, all members of the BBWAA were permitted to cast ballots; however, it would now be necessary that a writer have been a BBWAA member for ten years before becoming eligible to vote. This resulted in fewer than half the BBWAA members casting ballots, and a 39% reduction in the number of ballots from the previous year.

Members of the BBWAA now had the authority to select any players active in 1922 or later, provided they had not appeared in a major league game in 1946. Just as in the elections prior to 1946, voters were instructed to cast votes for 10 candidates; any candidate receiving votes on at least 75% of the ballots would be honored with induction to the Hall. If no candidate received votes on 75% of the ballots, the top 20 candidates would advance to the runoff election, with the vote totals from the first ballot not being revealed until the runoff was over.

In addition to many candidates becoming ineligible due to length of retirement, some players who had served in World War II and who had received votes in the 1945 and 1946 elections had now become ineligible once again as a result of appearing in major league games in 1946. Also, the previous year's creation of the Roll of Honor had reduced the incentive to vote for managers, as there was a question of whether they were to be considered for this separate honor. The reduction of the field of eligible candidates was considerable; the players elected by the Old-Timers Committee in 1946 had received 37% of the vote in the last BBWAA election, and had included 4 of the top 5 candidates. Players now ineligible due to retirement prior to the cutoff point accounted for an additional 14% of the 1946 vote, and players returning from WWII had received another 2%. Because less than half of the previous year's votes had been cast for those still eligible, hopes had increased that new inductees might at last be elected.

=== Election results ===
A total of 161 ballots were cast, with 1,559 individual votes for 39 specific candidates, an average of 9.68 per ballot; 121 votes were required for election. The results were announced in January 1947. For the first time in three elections and five years, the election was successful, electing four new inductees to the Hall; it was the largest group of inductees since the initial selections in 1936, and no runoff was necessary. The new system was hailed as a great success, and would be used with relatively minor revisions in the ensuing years.

The number of players receiving votes (39) was the lowest for any election yet, and barely half of the previous year's total (76). Very few players received votes who had not appeared in past voting, suggesting that with the new rules in effect, many voters focused on the previous year's results; with only weeks to complete their ballots, there was perhaps a limited effort to look for new candidates who had retired in the years between 1922 and 1945. With precise historical records scarce, and little time to seek them, there may also have been some uncertainty regarding particular candidates as to whether they had retired before or after 1922. Chief Bender, who received 72 votes, had played his last regular season in 1917; he was technically still eligible due to a single inning pitched in 1925, though it is unknown whether voters were aware of this. Bender had been - along with Mordecai Brown, an earlier figure who was more clearly now ineligible - one of only two pre-1920 candidates who received over 10% of the 1946 vote without being selected later by the Old-Timers Committee. Besides Bender, 4 other votes in the 1947 election also went to candidates retired slightly before 1922. With a reduced number of eligible voters, fewer candidates were named on only 1 or 2 ballots.

The trend of the past several years toward earlier players was now completely reversed; whereas players retired for well over 20 years had been receiving 60-70% of the vote, the 1947 election saw players retired for less than 13 years receive 73% of the vote. The top 9 candidates were all active in 1934 or later, and those who played their last season in the 1920s received only 16% of the vote.

The four candidates who received at least 75% of the vote and were elected are indicated in bold italics; candidates who have since been selected in subsequent elections are indicated in italics:

Key to colors
Elected to the Hall. These individuals are also indicated in **bold italics**.
Players who were elected in future elections. These individuals are also indicated in plain italics.

Player	Votes	Percent	Change
**Carl Hubbell**	140	87.0	▲37.0%
**Frankie Frisch**	136	84.5	▲33.0%
**Mickey Cochrane**	128	79.5	▲39.9%
**Lefty Grove**	123	76.4	▲41.3%
Pie Traynor	119	73.9	▲41.7%
Charlie Gehringer	105	65.2	▲43.9%
Rabbit Maranville	91	56.5	▲31.7%
Dizzy Dean	88	54.7	▲34.9%
Herb Pennock	86	53.4	▲33.1%
Chief Bender	72	44.7	▲25.4%
Harry Heilmann	65	40.4	▲29.0%
Ray Schalk	50	31.1	▲13.3%
Dazzy Vance	50	31.1	▲15.8%
Frank Baker	49	30.4	▲11.1%
Bill Terry	46	28.6	▲13.3%
Zack Wheat	37	23.0	▲20.0%
Ross Youngs	36	22.4	▲10.0%
Smoky Joe Wood	29	18.0	▲15.5%
Edd Roush	25	15.5	▲10.1%
Babe Adams	22	13.7	▲10.7%
Rube Marquard	18	11.2	▲8.2%
Jimmie Foxx	10	6.2	▼6.7%
Joe Cronin	6	3.7	-
Al Simmons	6	3.7	▲3.2%
Art Fletcher	3	1.9	-
Gavvy Cravath	2	1.2	▲0.7%
Gabby Hartnett	2	1.2	▲0.2%
Joe McCarthy	2	1.2	-
Eppa Rixey	2	1.2	-
Terry Turner	2	1.2	-
Eddie Dyer	1	0.6	-
Charlie Gelbert	1	0.6	-
Lefty Gomez	1	0.6	▼1.4%
Hank Gowdy	1	0.6	-
Jesse Haines	1	0.6	-
Bubbles Hargrave	1	0.6	-
George Kelly	1	0.6	-
Tony Lazzeri	1	0.6	-
Everett Scott	1	0.6	-
