= 1987 Baseball Hall of Fame balloting =

Elections to the Baseball Hall of Fame

National Baseball

Hall of Fame and Museum
- New inductees: 3
- via BBWAA: 2
- via Veterans Committee: 1
- Total inductees: 199
- Induction date: July 26, 1987

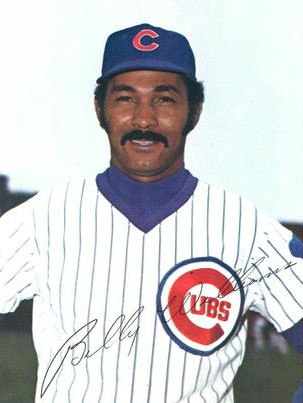
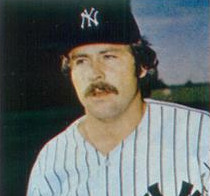
1987 BBWAA inductees Billy Williams (left) and Catfish Hunter

Elections to the National Baseball Hall of Fame and Museum for 1987 followed the system in place since 1978. The Baseball Writers' Association of America (BBWAA) voted by mail to select from recent major league players and elected two, Catfish Hunter and Billy Williams. The Veterans Committee met in closed sessions to consider older major league players as well as managers, umpires, executives, and figures from the Negro leagues. It selected Ray Dandridge from the Negro leagues. A formal induction ceremony was held in Cooperstown, New York, on July 26, 1987, with Commissioner of Baseball Peter Ueberroth in attendance.

== BBWAA election ==
The BBWAA was authorized to elect players who were active in 1967 or later but not after 1981. The ballot included candidates from the 1986 ballot who received at least 5% of the vote but were not elected, as well as selected players, chosen by a screening committee, whose last appearance was in 1981. All BBWAA members with at least ten years of membership were eligible to vote.

Voters were instructed to cast votes for up to ten candidates. Any candidate receiving votes on at least 75% of the ballots would be honored with induction into the Hall. The ballot included 28 players. A total of 413 ballots were cast, with 310 votes required for election. A total of 2,730 individual votes were cast, averaging 6.61 per ballot—a record low at that point and breaking the previous record of 6.81 set in 1962. Those candidates receiving less than 5% of the vote will not appear on future BBWAA ballots but may eventually be considered by the Veterans Committee.

Candidates who were eligible for the first time are indicated here with a dagger (†). The two candidates who received at least 75% of the vote and was elected is indicated in bold italics; candidates who have since been elected in subsequent elections are indicated in italics. The four candidates who received less than 5% of the vote, thus becoming ineligible for future BBWAA consideration, are indicated with an asterisk (*).

Lew Burdette was on the ballot for the 15th and final time.

Player	Votes	Percent	Change	Year
**Billy Williams**	**354**	**85.7**	▲11.6%	6th
**Catfish Hunter**	**315**	**76.3**	▲8.3%	3rd
Jim Bunning	289	70.0	▲4.4%	11th
Orlando Cepeda	179	43.3	▲7.8%	8th
Roger Maris	176	42.6	▲1.0%	14th
Tony Oliva	160	38.7	▲2.5%	6th
Harvey Kuenn	144	34.9	▲1.0%	11th
Bill Mazeroski	125	30.3	▲6.8%	10th
Maury Wills	113	27.4	▼1.8%	10th
Ken Boyer	96	23.2	▲0.8%	8th
Lew Burdette	96	23.2	▲0.6%	15th
Mickey Lolich	84	20.3	▲0.1%	3rd
Minnie Miñoso	82	19.9	▼1.0%	3rd
Roy Face	78	18.9	▲1.5%	12th
Ron Santo	78	18.9	▲3.8%	4th
Dick Allen	55	13.3	▲3.7%	5th
Curt Flood	50	12.1	▲1.5%	6th
Vada Pinson	48	11.6	▲1.5%	6th
Joe Torre	47	11.4	▼2.7%	5th
Elston Howard	44	10.7	▼1.3%	14th
Don Larsen	30	7.3	▼0.5%	14th
Thurman Munson	28	6.8	▼1.4%	7th
Wilbur Wood	26	6.3	▲0.9%	4th
Bobby Bonds†	24	5.8	-	1st
Mike Marshall†*	6	1.5	-	1st
Sal Bando†*	3	0.7	-	1st
Jerry Grote†*	0	0.0	-	1st
Steve Stone†*	0	0.0	-	1st

Key to colors
Elected to the Hall. These individuals are also indicated in **bold italics**.
Players who were elected in future elections. These individuals are also indicated in plain italics.
Players not yet elected who returned on the 1988 ballot.
Eliminated from future BBWAA voting. These individuals remain eligible for future Veterans Committee consideration.

The newly eligible players included 8 All-Stars, three of whom were not included on the ballot, representing a total of 17 All-Star selections. 4-time All Star Sal Bando had the most selections of any newly eligible candidate. The field included two Cy Young Award winners (Mike Marshall and Steve Stone, who retired one season after winning his award).

Players eligible for the first time who were not included on the ballot were: Rick Auerbach, Ken Brett, Reggie Cleveland, Dick Drago, Duffy Dyer, John Ellis, Tom Hutton, Pat Kelly, Mike Lum, Billy North, Johnny Oates, Freddie Patek, Dave Roberts, Rennie Stennett, Mike Tyson and John Vukovich.

== J. G. Taylor Spink Award ==
Jack Lang (1921–2007) received the J. G. Taylor Spink Award honoring a baseball writer. The award was voted at the December 1986 meeting of the BBWAA, and included in the summer 1987 ceremonies.
