= 1954 Baseball Hall of Fame balloting =

Elections to the Baseball Hall of Fame

National Baseball

Hall of Fame and Museum
- New inductees: 3
- via BBWAA: 3
- Total inductees: 73
- Induction date: August 9, 1954

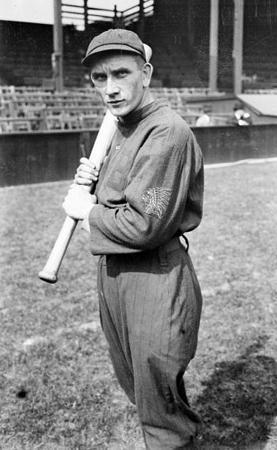
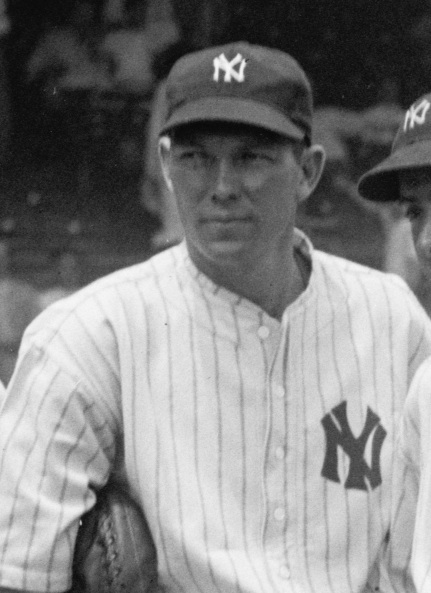
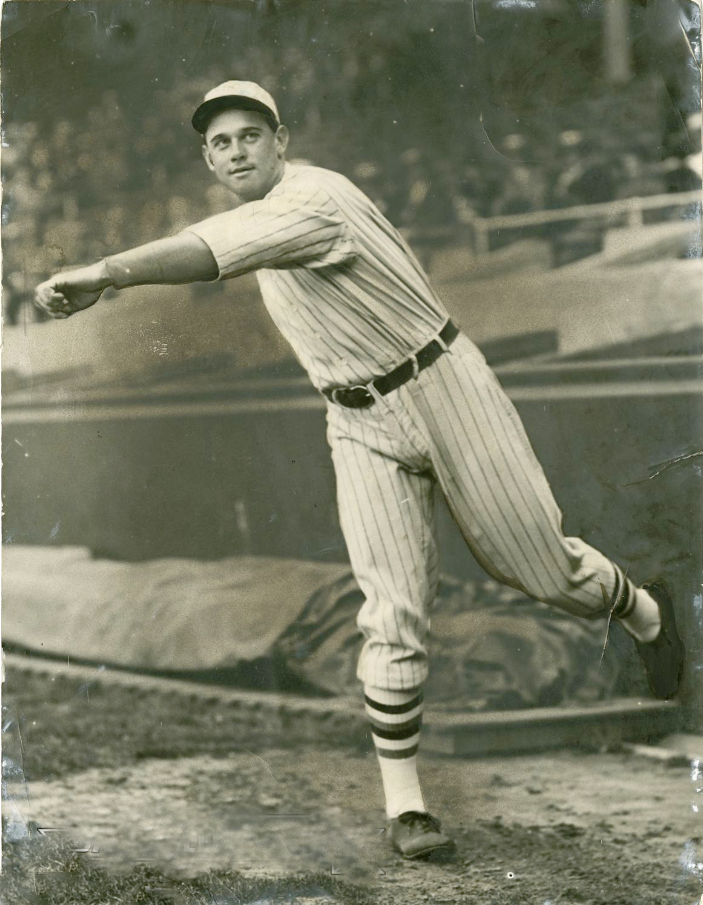
1953 inductees (L-R): Rabbit Maranville, Bill Dickey, and Bill Terry

Elections to the Baseball Hall of Fame for 1954 followed a system practically the same as in 1952 because the new Veterans Committee was meeting only in odd-number years (until 1962). The Baseball Writers' Association of America (BBWAA) voted by mail to select from recent players and elected three: Bill Dickey, Rabbit Maranville, and Bill Terry. A formal induction ceremony was held in Cooperstown, New York, on August 9, 1954, with Commissioner of Baseball Ford Frick presiding.

== BBWAA election ==
Any candidate receiving votes on at least 75% of the ballots would be honored with induction to the Hall. Votes were cast for 53 players; a total of 252 ballots were cast, with 189 votes required for election. A total of 2,091 individual votes were cast, an average of 8.30 per ballot.

The three candidates who received 75% of the vote and were elected are indicated in bold italics; candidates who have since been elected in subsequent elections are indicated in italics.

Players were eligible if they had finished their career between 1928 and 1952. Starting with this election, players had to have been retired from baseball (including no longer working as a manager) for a minimum of five seasons to be eligible, unless they had received at least 100 votes in the prior year's election—those who qualified under this clause were Joe DiMaggio and Ted Lyons.

Player	Votes	Percent	Change
**Rabbit Maranville**	209	82.9	▲20.8%
**Bill Dickey**	202	80.2	▲12.4%
**Bill Terry**	195	77.4	▲5.1%
Joe DiMaggio	175	69.4	▲25.1%
Ted Lyons	170	67.5	▲14.8%
Dazzy Vance	158	62.7	▲5.9%
Gabby Hartnett	151	59.9	▲20.5%
Hank Greenberg	97	38.5	▲8.2%
Joe Cronin	85	33.7	▲7.6%
Max Carey	55	21.8	▲1.0%
Ray Schalk	54	21.4	▲1.7%
Edd Roush	52	20.6	▲8.5%
Hank Gowdy	51	20.2	▼1.8%
Hack Wilson	48	19.0	▲2.7%
Lefty Gomez	38	15.1	▲1.8%
Ross Youngs	34	13.5	▲1.8%
Zack Wheat	33	13.1	▲1.0%
Tony Lazzeri	30	11.9	▲1.3%
Red Ruffing	29	11.5	▲2.4%
Kiki Cuyler	20	7.9	▲1.1%
Duffy Lewis	20	7.9	▲0.3%
Jim Bottomley	16	6.3	▲2.5%
Rube Marquard	15	6.0	▼1.2%
Waite Hoyt	14	5.6	▲0.3%
Babe Adams	13	5.2	▼1.2%
Dickie Kerr	13	5.2	▲0.3%
Red Faber	12	4.8	▲1.4%
Chuck Klein	11	4.4	-
Dave Bancroft	10	4.0	▲0.2%
Sam Rice	9	3.6	▲2.5%
Jimmie Wilson	8	3.2	▼0.6%
Wilbur Cooper	7	2.8	▼0.6%
Art Nehf	7	2.8	▲1.3%
Jesse Haines	6	2.4	▲0.9%
Eppa Rixey	5	2.0	▲0.9%
Muddy Ruel	5	2.0	▼1.0%
Howard Ehmke	4	1.6	▲0.5%
Everett Scott	4	1.6	▼0.3%
Bill Wambsganss	4	1.6	▼1.2%
Cy Williams	4	1.6	▲0.1%
Clyde Milan	3	1.2	▲0.8%
Nick Altrock	2	0.8	▲0.4%
Chick Hafey	2	0.8	Steady
Arky Vaughan	2	0.8	▲0.4%
Lu Blue	1	0.4	-
Ossie Bluege	1	0.4	-
Goose Goslin	1	0.4	-
Heinie Groh	1	0.4	-
Babe Herman	1	0.4	▼0.4%
Travis Jackson	1	0.4	▼0.4%
Roger Peckinpaugh	1	0.4	▼0.4%
Joe Sewell	1	0.4	-
Glenn Wright	1	0.4	▼0.7%

Key to colors
Elected to the Hall. These individuals are also indicated in **bold italics**.
Players who were elected in future elections. These individuals are also indicated in plain italics.
