= 1979 Baseball Hall of Fame balloting =

Elections to the Baseball Hall of Fame

National Baseball

Hall of Fame and Museum
- New inductees: 3
- via BBWAA: 1
- via Veterans Committee: 2
- Total inductees: 169
- Induction date: August 5, 1979

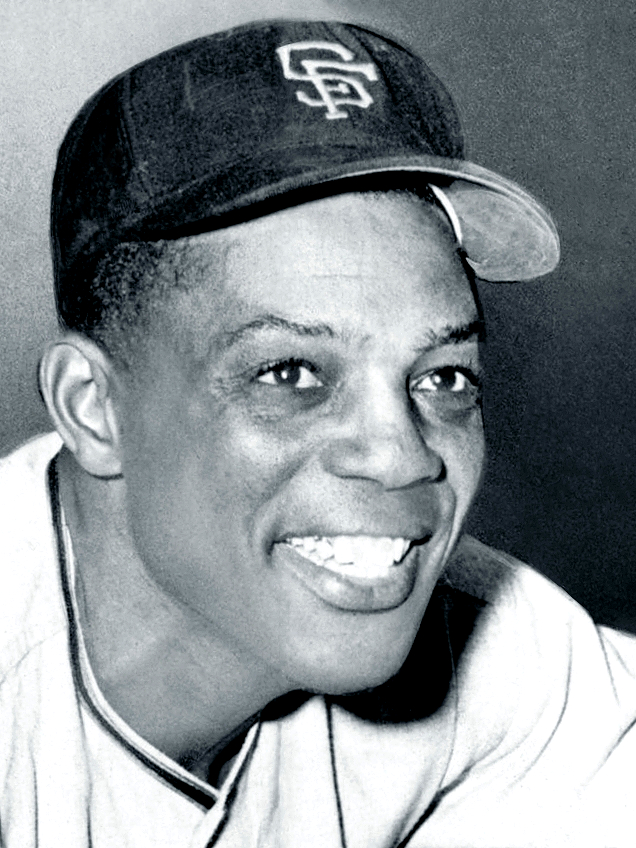
1979 BBWAA inductee Willie Mays

Elections to the Baseball Hall of Fame for 1979 followed the system in place since 1978, except that players who appeared on fewer than 5% of BBWAA ballots would now no longer be eligible in future elections. The Baseball Writers' Association of America (BBWAA) voted by mail to select from recent major league players and elected Willie Mays. The Veterans Committee met in closed sessions to consider older major league players as well as managers, umpires, executives, and figures from the Negro leagues. It selected Warren Giles and Hack Wilson. A formal induction ceremony was held in Cooperstown, New York, on August 5, 1979, with Commissioner of Baseball Bowie Kuhn presiding. The annual Hall of Fame Game, an exhibition contest, was played the following day; this was the first time that the induction ceremony and game were held on different days.

== BBWAA election ==
The BBWAA was authorized to elect players active in 1959 or later, but not after 1973; the ballot included players whose last appearance was in 1973. Originally a selection committee met and decided that only Willie Mays and Luis Aparicio were first year players deserving of being on the ballot, but after a protest by Milt Pappas, all eligible first-year candidates were placed on the ballot.

All 10-year members of the BBWAA were eligible to vote. A new rule affecting candidate eligibility was put in place in 1979 placing importance on a candidate receiving 5% of votes. The thirty-one players affected by this rule who would not appear on the 1980 ballot are marked with an asterisk (*).

Voters were instructed to cast votes for up to 10 candidates; any candidate receiving votes on at least 75% of the ballots would be honored with induction to the Hall. The ballot consisted of 54 players; a total of 432 ballots were cast, with 324 votes required for election. A total of 3,327 individual votes were cast, an average of 7.70 per ballot.

Candidates who were eligible for the first time are indicated here with a dagger (†). The one candidate who received at least 75% of the vote and was elected is indicated in bold italics; candidates who have since been elected in subsequent elections are indicated in italics.

Enos Slaughter and Bobby Thomson were on the ballot for the final time.

Players	Votes	Percent	Change
**Willie Mays**†	409	94.7	-
Duke Snider	308	71.3	▲4.3%
Enos Slaughter	297	68.8	▼0.1%
Gil Hodges	242	56.0	▼3.6%
Don Drysdale	233	53.9	▼3.9%
Nellie Fox	174	40.3	▲1.0%
Hoyt Wilhelm	168	38.9	▼2.8%
Maury Wills	166	38.4	▲8.1%
Red Schoendienst	159	36.8	▲2.5%
Jim Bunning	147	34.0	▼13.8%
Richie Ashburn	130	30.1	▼11.6%
Roger Maris	127	29.4	▲7.5%
Luis Aparicio†	120	27.8	-
Mickey Vernon	88	20.4	▲3.0%
Alvin Dark	80	18.5	▲2.7%
Harvey Kuenn	63	14.6	▼0.7%
Ted Kluszewski	58	13.4	▼0.1%
Lew Burdette	53	12.3	▼7.8%
Don Larsen	53	12.3	▲3.9%
Don Newcombe	52	12.0	▼0.7%
Bill Mazeroski	36	8.3	▲2.2%
Roy Face	35	8.1	▲1.0%
Elston Howard	30	6.9	▼3.9%
Ken Boyer*	20	4.6	▼0.1%
Curt Flood*	14	3.2	▲1.1%
Bobby Thomson*	11	2.5	▲1.2%
Del Crandall*	9	2.1	▲0.5%
Vern Law*	9	2.1	▲0.5%
Harvey Haddix*	8	1.9	▲0.1%
Frank Howard†*	6	1.4	-
Ron Perranoski†*	6	1.4	-
Milt Pappas†*	5	1.2	-
Clete Boyer*	3	0.7	▲0.4%
Denny McLain*	3	0.7	▼0.4%
Jim Maloney*	2	0.5	-
Johnny Callison†*	1	0.2	-
Hal Lanier†*	1	0.2	-
Chris Short†*	1	0.2	-
Tommie Agee†*	0	0.0	-
Bernie Allen†*	0	0.0	-
Gene Alley†*	0	0.0	-
Jim Beauchamp†*	0	0.0	-
Bobby Bolin†*	0	0.0	-
Ray Culp†*	0	0.0	-
Eddie Fisher†*	0	0.0	-
Fred Gladding†*	0	0.0	-
Jerry May†*	0	0.0	-
José Pagán†*	0	0.0	-
Joe Pepitone†*	0	0.0	-
Rich Reese†*	0	0.0	-
Larry Stahl†*	0	0.0	-
John Stephenson†*	0	0.0	-
Jimmy Stewart†*	0	0.0	-
Jeff Torborg†*	0	0.0	-

Key to colors
Elected to the Hall. These individuals are also indicated in **bold italics**.
Players who were elected in future elections. These individuals are also indicated in plain italics.
Players not yet elected who returned on the 1980 ballot.
Eliminated from future BBWAA voting. These individuals remain eligible for future Veterans Committee consideration.

The newly-eligible players included 11 All-Stars, representing a total of 51 All-Star selections. Among the new candidates were 20-time All-Star Willie Mays and 10-time All-Star Luis Aparicio. The field included one MVP (Mays, who won twice), and four Rookies of the Year (Tommy Agee, Luis Aparicio, Frank Howard and Willie Mays). In addition, Willie Mays had 12 Gold Gloves at Outfield, tied for most all-time with Roberto Clemente, and Luis Aparicio had 9 Gold Gloves at Shortstop, the record at the time.

== J. G. Taylor Spink Award ==
Tim Murnane (1851–1917) and Dick Young (1917–1987) received the J. G. Taylor Spink Award honoring baseball writers. The awards were voted at the December 1978 meeting of the BBWAA, and included in the summer 1979 ceremonies.
