= 1994 Baseball Hall of Fame balloting =

Elections to the Baseball Hall of Fame

National Baseball

Hall of Fame and Museum
- New inductees: 3
- via BBWAA: 1
- via Veterans Committee: 2
- Total inductees: 219
- Induction date: July 31, 1994

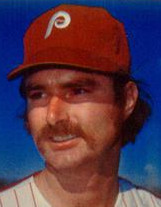
1994 BBWAA inductee Steve Carlton

Elections to the Baseball Hall of Fame for 1994 followed the system in place since 1978. The Baseball Writers' Association of America (BBWAA) voted by mail to select from recent major league players and elected Steve Carlton. The Veterans Committee met in closed sessions to consider older major league players as well as managers, umpires, executives, and figures from the Negro leagues. It selected two, Leo Durocher and Phil Rizzuto. A formal induction ceremony was held in Cooperstown, New York, on July 31, 1994.

== BBWAA election ==
The BBWAA was authorized to elect players active in 1974 or later, but not after 1988; the ballot included candidates from the 1993 ballot who received at least 5% of the vote but were not elected, along with selected players, chosen by a screening committee, whose last appearance was in 1988. All 10-year members of the BBWAA were eligible to vote.

Voters were instructed to cast votes for up to 10 candidates; any candidate receiving votes on at least 75% of the ballots would be honored with induction to the Hall. The ballot consisted of 38 players; a total of 456 ballots were cast, with 342 votes required for election. A total of 2,884 individual votes were cast, an average of 6.32 per ballot. Those candidates receiving less than 5% of the vote will not appear on future BBWAA ballots, but may eventually be considered by the Veterans Committee.

Candidates who were eligible for the first time are indicated here with a dagger (†). The one candidate who received at least 75% of the vote and was elected is indicated in bold italics; candidates who have since been elected in subsequent elections are indicated in italics. The 14 candidates who received less than 5% of the vote, thus becoming ineligible for future BBWAA consideration, are indicated with an asterisk (*).

Orlando Cepeda and Ken Boyer were on the ballot for the 15th and final time.

Player	Votes	Percent	Change	Year
**Steve Carlton**†	**436**	**95.6**	-	1st
Orlando Cepeda	335	73.5	▲13.9%	15th
Phil Niekro	273	59.9	▼5.8%	2nd
Tony Pérez	263	57.7	▲2.6%	3rd
Don Sutton†	259	56.8	-	1st
Steve Garvey	166	36.4	▼5.2%	2nd
Tony Oliva	158	34.6	▼2.5%	13th
Ron Santo	150	32.9	▼3.7%	11th
Bruce Sutter†	109	23.9	-	1st
Jim Kaat	98	21.5	▼8.1%	6th
Dick Allen	66	14.5	▼2.0%	12th
Ken Boyer	54	11.8	▼4.5%	15th
Joe Torre	53	11.6	▼3.3%	12th
Vada Pinson	46	10.1	▲1.1%	13th
Minnie Miñoso	45	9.9	▼5.9%	10th
Luis Tiant	42	9.2	▼5.5%	7th
Curt Flood	39	8.6	▲0.1%	13th
Graig Nettles†	38	8.3	-	1st
Bobby Bonds	37	8.1	▼2.5%	8th
Rusty Staub	36	7.9	▲0.3%	4th
Dave Concepción†	31	6.8	-	1st
Thurman Munson	31	6.8	▼2.7%	14th
Ron Guidry†	24	5.3	-	1st
Mickey Lolich	23	5.0	▼5.2%	10th
Ted Simmons†*	17	3.7	-	1st
George Foster	16	3.5	▼3.4%	3rd
Vida Blue	14	3.1	▼5.6%	3rd
Don Baylor†	12	2.6	-	1st
Joe Niekro†*	6	1.3	-	1st
José Cruz†*	2	0.4	-	1st
Phil Garner†*	2	0.4	-	1st
Larry Parrish†*	2	0.4	-	1st
Ray Knight†*	1	0.2	-	1st
Chris Chambliss†*	0	0.0	-	1st
George Hendrick†*	0	0.0	-	1st
Bob Horner†*	0	0.0	-	1st
Scott McGregor†*	0	0.0	-	1st
Mario Soto†*	0	0.0	-	1st

Key to colors
Elected to the Hall. These individuals are also indicated in **bold italics**.
Players who were elected in future elections. These individuals are also indicated in plain italics.
Players not yet elected who returned on the 1995 ballot.
Eliminated from future BBWAA voting. These individuals remain eligible for future Veterans Committee consideration. Note that Ted Simmons was eliminated from BBWAA voting but was selected in the 2020 Baseball Hall of Fame balloting by the Modern Baseball Veterans Committee in December 2019.

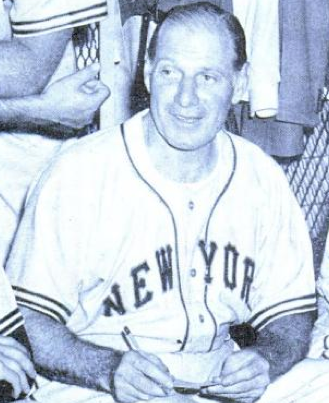
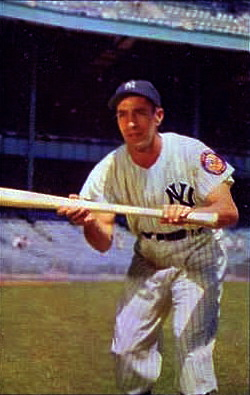
1994 Veterans Committee inductees Leo Durocher (left) and Phil Rizzuto

The newly eligible players included 26 All-Stars, eight of whom were not included on the ballot, representing a total of 86 All-Star selections. Among the new candidates were 10-time All-Star Steve Carlton, 9-time All-Star Dave Concepción, 8-time All-Star Ted Simmons, and 6-time All-Stars Graig Nettles and Bruce Sutter. The field included MVP (Don Baylor), three Cy Young Award winners (Sutter, Ron Guidry, and Carlton, who won four times), and two Rookies of the Year (Chris Chambliss and Bob Horner).

Players eligible for the first time who were not included on the ballot were: Bill Almon, Joaquín Andújar, Juan Beníquez, Ron Davis, Iván DeJesús, Gene Garber, Steve Henderson, Larry Herndon, Steve Kemp, Tippy Martinez, Donnie Moore, Jim Morrison, Jerry Mumphrey, Gary Roenicke, Jerry Royster, Lary Sorensen, Willie Upshaw, and Butch Wynegar.

== J. G. Taylor Spink Award ==
Wendell Smith (1914–1972) received the J. G. Taylor Spink Award honoring a baseball writer. The award was voted at the December 1993 meeting of the BBWAA, and included in the summer 1994 ceremonies.
