= 1986 Baseball Hall of Fame balloting =

Elections to the Baseball Hall of Fame

National Baseball

Hall of Fame and Museum
- New inductees: 3
- via BBWAA: 1
- via Veterans Committee: 2
- Total inductees: 196
- Induction date: August 3, 1986

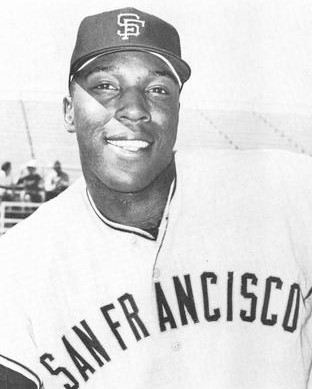
1986 BBWAA inductee Willie McCovey

Elections to the Baseball Hall of Fame for 1986 followed the system in place since 1978. The Baseball Writers' Association of America (BBWAA) voted by mail to select from recent major league players and elected Willie McCovey. The Veterans Committee met in closed sessions to consider older major league players as well as managers, umpires, executives, and figures from the Negro leagues. It selected two players, Bobby Doerr and Ernie Lombardi. A formal induction ceremony was held in Cooperstown, New York, on August 3, 1986, with Commissioner of Baseball Peter Ueberroth, and former Commissioners Bowie Kuhn and Happy Chandler, in attendance.

== BBWAA election ==
The BBWAA was authorized to elect players active in 1966 or later, but not after 1980; the ballot included candidates from the 1985 ballot who received at least 5% of the vote but were not elected, along with selected players, chosen by a screening committee, whose last appearance was in 1980. All 10-year members of the BBWAA were eligible to vote.

Voters were instructed to cast votes for up to 10 candidates; any candidate receiving votes on at least 75% of the ballots would be honored with induction to the Hall. Results of the 1986 election by the BBWAA were announced on January 8. The ballot consisted of 41 players; a total of 425 ballots were cast, with 319 votes required for election. A total of 2,992 individual votes were cast, an average of 7.04 per ballot. (This would prove to be the last election to average 7 or more votes per ballot until 2014.) Those candidates receiving less than 5% of the vote will not appear on future BBWAA ballots, but may eventually be considered by the Veterans Committee.

Candidates who were eligible for the first time are indicated here with a dagger (†). The one candidate who received at least 75% of the vote and was elected is indicated in bold italics; candidates who have since been elected in subsequent elections are indicated in italics. The 17 candidates who received less than 5% of the vote, thus becoming ineligible for future BBWAA consideration, are indicated with an asterisk (*).

Player	Votes	Percent	Change	Year
**Willie McCovey**†	**346**	**81.4**	-	1st
Billy Williams	315	74.1	▲10.3%	5th
Catfish Hunter	289	68.0	▲14.3%	2nd
Jim Bunning	279	65.6	▲13.8%	10th
Roger Maris	177	41.6	▲9.2%	13th
Tony Oliva	154	36.2	▲7.3%	5th
Orlando Cepeda	152	35.8	▲6.9%	7th
Harvey Kuenn	144	33.9	▲2.3%	10th
Maury Wills	124	29.2	▲5.7%	9th
Bill Mazeroski	100	23.5	▲1.5%	9th
Lew Burdette	96	22.6	▲1.8%	14th
Ken Boyer	95	22.4	▲5.2%	7th
Minnie Miñoso†	89	20.9	-	2nd (see below)
Mickey Lolich	86	20.2	▲0.5%	2nd
Roy Face	74	17.4	▲1.7%	11th
Ron Santo	64	15.1	▲1.7%	3rd
Joe Torre	60	14.1	▲3.0%	4th
Elston Howard	51	12.0	▼1.7%	13th
Curt Flood	45	10.6	▲3.5%	5th
Vada Pinson	43	10.1	▲5.3%	5th
Dick Allen	41	9.6	▲2.5%	4th
Thurman Munson	35	8.2	▲0.1%	6th
Don Larsen	33	7.8	▼0.3%	13th
Wilbur Wood	23	5.4	▲1.3%	3rd
Tim McCarver†*	16	3.8	-	1st
Dave McNally*	12	2.8	▲1.0%	4th
John Hiller†*	11	2.6	-	1st
Paul Blair†*	8	1.9	-	1st
J. R. Richard†*	7	1.6	-	1st
Ken Holtzman*	5	1.2	-	2nd
Willie Horton†*	4	0.9	-	1st
Jim Lonborg*	3	0.7	▼0.1%	2nd
Andy Messersmith*	3	0.7	▼0.1%	2nd
Dave Cash†*	2	0.5	-	1st
Manny Sanguillén†*	2	0.5	-	1st
Jack Billingham†*	1	0.2	-	1st
José Cardenal†*	1	0.2	-	1st
Bud Harrelson†*	1	0.2	-	1st
George Scott*	1	0.2	▲0.2%	2nd
Vic Davalillo†*	0	0.0	-	1st
Darold Knowles†*	0	0.0	-	1st

Key to colors
Elected to the Hall. These individuals are also indicated in **bold italics**.
Players who were elected in future elections. These individuals are also indicated in plain italics.
Players not yet elected who returned on the 1987 ballot.
Eliminated from future BBWAA voting. These individuals remain eligible for future Veterans Committee consideration.

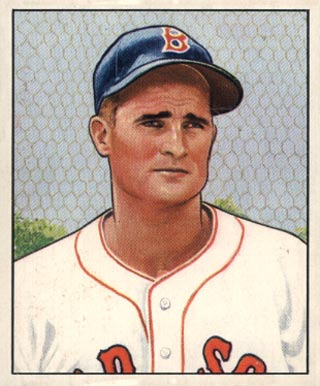
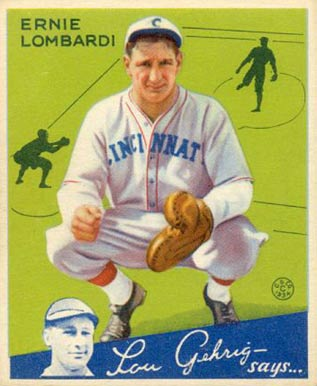
1986 Veterans Committee inductees Bobby Doerr (left) and Ernie Lombardi

The newly eligible players included 15 All-Stars, two of whom were not included on the ballot, representing a total of 36 All-Star selections. Among the new candidates were 7-time All-Star Minnie Miñoso, who was re-eligible due to two at-bats in 1980, and 6-time All Star Willie McCovey. The field included one MVP (McCovey), and two Rookies of the Year (McCovey and Ted Sizemore).

Players eligible for the first time who were not included on the ballot were: Bill Bonham, Pedro Borbón, Bernie Carbo, Ralph Garr, Ken Henderson, Von Joshua, Fred Kendall, Lerrin LaGrow, Skip Lockwood, Elliott Maddox, Roger Metzger, Fred Norman, Marty Pattin, Dave Rader, Merv Rettenmund, Jim Rooker, Ted Sizemore and Bob Stinson.

== J. G. Taylor Spink Award ==
Earl Lawson (1923–2003) received the J. G. Taylor Spink Award honoring a baseball writer. The award was voted at the December 1985 meeting of the BBWAA, and included in the summer 1986 ceremonies.
