= 1969 Baseball Hall of Fame balloting =

Elections to the Baseball Hall of Fame

National Baseball

Hall of Fame and Museum
- New inductees: 4
- via BBWAA: 2
- via Veterans Committee: 2
- Total inductees: 114
- Induction date: July 28, 1969

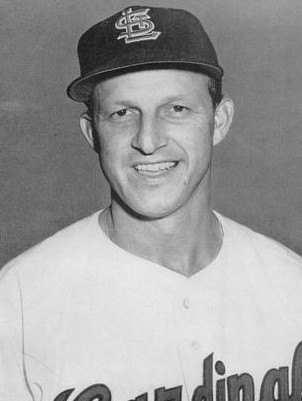
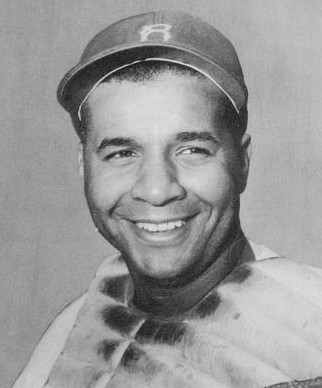
1969 BBWAA inductees Stan Musial (left) and Roy Campanella

Elections to the Baseball Hall of Fame for 1969 followed the system reintroduced in 1968. The Baseball Writers' Association of America (BBWAA) voted once by mail to select from recent major league players and elected two, Roy Campanella and Stan Musial. The Veterans Committee met in closed sessions to consider executives, managers, umpires, and earlier major league players. It selected two players, Stan Coveleski and Waite Hoyt. A formal induction ceremony was held in Cooperstown, New York, on July 28, 1969, with Commissioner of Baseball Bowie Kuhn presiding.

== BBWAA election ==
The BBWAA was authorized to elect players active in 1949 or later, but not after 1963; the ballot included candidates from the 1968 ballot who received at least 5% of the vote but were not elected, along with selected players, chosen by a screening committee, whose last appearance was in 1963. All 10-year members of the BBWAA were eligible to vote.

Voters were instructed to cast votes for up to 10 candidates; any candidate receiving votes on at least 75% of the ballots would be honored with induction to the Hall. The ballot consisted of 46 players; a total of 340 ballots were cast, with 255 votes required for election. A total of 2,604 individual votes were cast, an average of 7.66 per ballot.

Candidates who were eligible for the first time are indicated here with a dagger (†). The two candidates who received at least 75% of the vote and were elected are indicated in bold italics; candidates who have since been elected in subsequent elections are indicated in italics.

Schoolboy Rowe, Dixie Walker and Mort Cooper were on the ballot for the final time.

Player	Votes	Percent	Change
**Stan Musial**†	317	93.2	-
**Roy Campanella**	270	79.4	▲7.0%
Lou Boudreau	218	64.1	▲12.5%
Ralph Kiner	137	40.3	▼1.4%
Enos Slaughter	128	37.6	▼8.0%
Johnny Mize	116	34.1	▼2.3%
Marty Marion	112	32.9	▲1.5%
Allie Reynolds	98	28.8	▼4.8%
Joe Gordon	97	28.5	▲1.3%
Johnny Vander Meer	95	27.9	-
Early Wynn†	95	27.9	-
Pee Wee Reese	89	26.2	▼2.4%
Gil Hodges†	82	24.1	-
Hal Newhouser	82	24.1	▼0.4%
Phil Rizzuto	78	22.9	▼3.2%
Red Schoendienst†	65	19.1	-
Bobby Doerr	62	18.2	▲1.2%
George Kell	60	17.6	▲1.0%
Bob Lemon	56	16.5	▼0.1%
Tommy Henrich	50	14.7	▲6.9%
Alvin Dark	48	14.1	▲1.4%
Phil Cavarretta	37	10.9	▲2.8%
Bobo Newsom	32	9.4	▲1.6%
Mickey Vernon	21	6.2	▼1.6%
Bucky Walters	20	5.9	▼17.8%
Schoolboy Rowe	17	5.0	▲4.3%
Charlie Keller	14	4.1	▲0.2%
Dom DiMaggio	13	3.8	▲1.0%
Ewell Blackwell	11	3.2	▲1.4%
Ted Kluszewski	11	3.2	▼1.7%
Richie Ashburn	10	2.9	▲0.8%
Dixie Walker	9	2.6	▲0.5%
Johnny Sain	8	2.4	▼0.1%
Minnie Miñoso†	6	1.8	-
Bobby Thomson	6	1.8	▼2.8%
Walker Cooper	5	1.5	▼1.3%
Carl Erskine	4	1.2	▼2.0%
Dutch Leonard	4	1.2	▼0.6%
Wally Moses	4	1.2	▼0.2%
Mort Cooper	3	0.9	-
Gil McDougald	3	0.9	▼1.4%
Don Newcombe	3	0.9	▼2.3%
Vic Raschi	3	0.9	▲0.5%
Harry Brecheen	2	0.6	▼0.5%
Ed Lopat	2	0.6	▼0.1%
Jackie Jensen	1	0.3	▼0.8%

Key to colors
Elected to the Hall. These individuals are also indicated in **bold italics**.
Players who were elected in future elections. These individuals are also indicated in plain italics.
Players not yet elected who returned on the 1970 ballot.
Eliminated from future BBWAA voting. These individuals remain eligible for future Veterans Committee consideration.

== J. G. Taylor Spink Award ==
H. G. Salsinger (1885–1958) received the J. G. Taylor Spink Award honoring a baseball writer. The award was voted at the December 1968 meeting of the BBWAA, and included in the summer 1969 ceremonies.
