= 1957 Baseball Hall of Fame balloting =

Elections to the Baseball Hall of Fame

National Baseball

Hall of Fame and Museum
- New inductees: 2
- via Veterans Committee: 2
- Total inductees: 83
- Induction date: July 22, 1957

Elections to the Baseball Hall of Fame for 1957 followed a system established after the 1956 election. The baseball writers would vote on recent players only in even-number years (until 1967). The Veterans Committee met in closed sessions to consider executives, managers, umpires, and earlier major league players. It selected outfielder Sam Crawford, who had 2961 hits from 1899 to 1917, and Joe McCarthy, who managed the New York Yankees to eight pennants in sixteen seasons, with seven World Series titles including four consecutive championships (1936–1939). A formal induction ceremony was held in Cooperstown, New York, on July 22, 1957, with Commissioner of Baseball Ford Frick presiding.

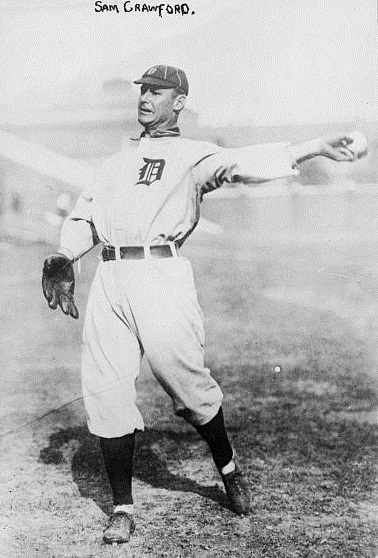
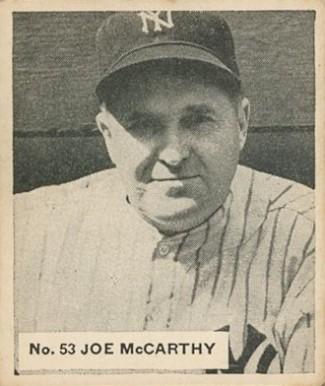
1957 inductees Sam Crawford (left) and Joe McCarthy
