= 1963 Baseball Hall of Fame balloting =

Elections to the Baseball Hall of Fame

National Baseball

Hall of Fame and Museum
- New inductees: 4
- via Veterans Committee: 4
- Total inductees: 94
- Induction date: August 5, 1963

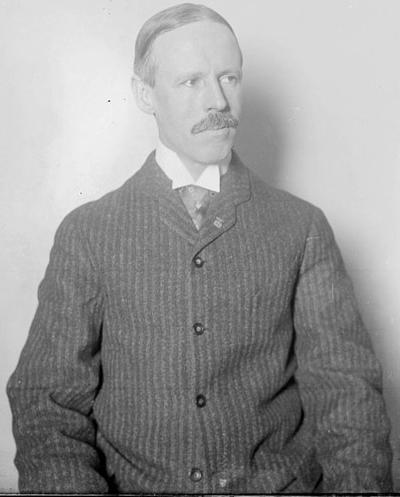
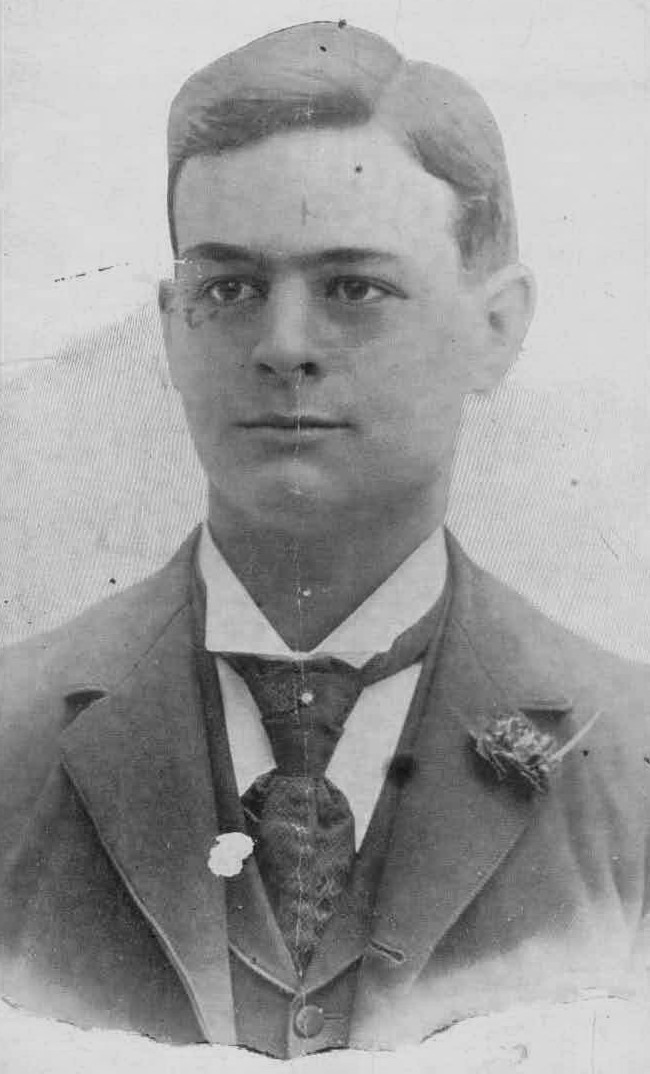
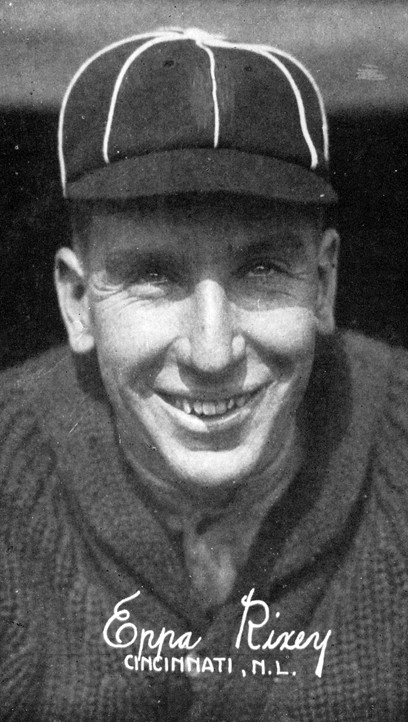
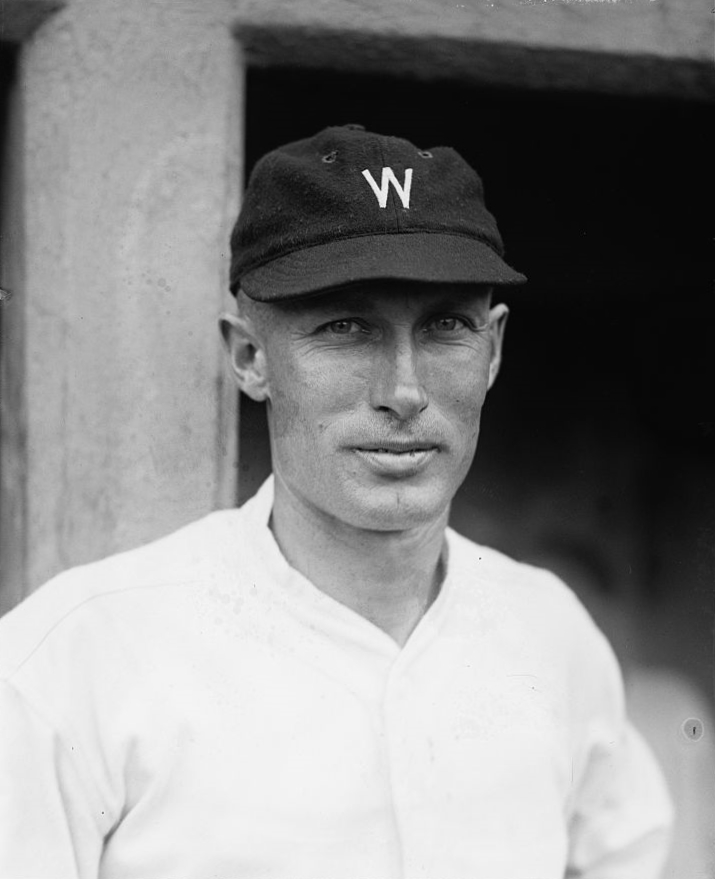
1963 inductees (L-R): John Clarkson, Elmer Flick, Eppa Rixey, and Sam Rice

Elections to the Baseball Hall of Fame for 1963 followed a system established for odd-number years after the 1956 election. Namely, the baseball writers were voting on recent players only in even-number years.

The Veterans Committee met in closed sessions to consider executives, managers, umpires, and earlier major league players. It selected four people: 19th-century 300-game winner John Clarkson, turn-of-the-century outfielder Elmer Flick, 266-game winner Eppa Rixey, and outfielder Sam Rice, who had 2987 career hits. Flick, Rixey, and Rice were all still living at the time the selections were announced, however Rixey died several months before the induction ceremony. A formal induction ceremony was held in Cooperstown, New York, on August 5, 1963, with Commissioner of Baseball Ford Frick presiding.

== J. G. Taylor Spink Award ==
Following the December 1962 death of J. G. Taylor Spink, publisher of The Sporting News, the Baseball Writers' Association of America (BBWAA) inaugurated an award to honor one baseball writer annually. Conferred as part of the induction ceremonies, Spink himself was the first person honored with the award, posthumously. Known as the J. G. Taylor Spink Award for over 50 years, it was renamed as the BBWAA Career Excellence Award in February 2021.
