= 2000 Baseball Hall of Fame balloting =

Elections to the Baseball Hall of Fame

National Baseball

Hall of Fame and Museum
- New inductees: 5
- via BBWAA: 2
- via Veterans Committee: 3
- Total inductees: 249
- Induction date: July 23, 2000

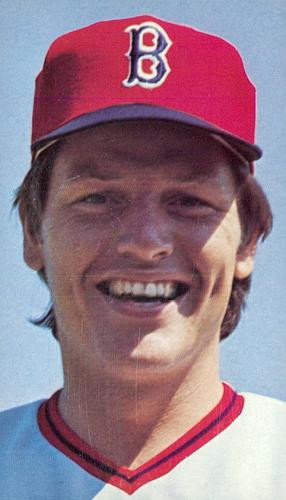
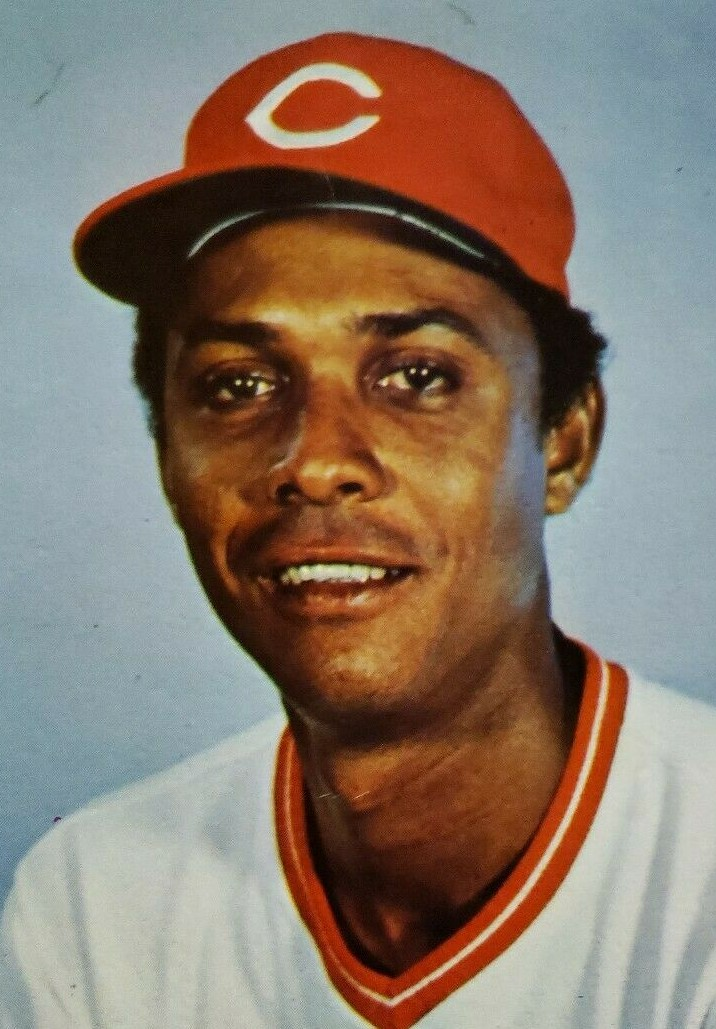
2000 BBWAA inductees Carlton Fisk (left) and Tony Pérez

Elections to the Baseball Hall of Fame for 2000 followed the system in use since 1995. The Baseball Writers' Association of America (BBWAA) voted by mail to select from recent major league players and elected two: Carlton Fisk and Tony Pérez. The Veterans Committee met in closed sessions and selected three people from multiple classified ballots: Sparky Anderson, Bid McPhee, and Turkey Stearnes.

Induction ceremonies in Cooperstown, New York, were held July 23 with George Grande as master of ceremonies.

== BBWAA election ==
The BBWAA was authorized to elect players active in 1980 or later but not after 1994 (final game, 1980 to 1994). The ballot comprised 30 candidates, 16 returning from the 1999 ballot, where they received at least 5% support, and 14 on the ballot for the first time (†), chosen by a screening committee from players who last appeared in 1994. All 10-year members of the BBWAA were eligible to participate by voting for as many as 10 candidates; any candidate receiving votes on at least 75% of the ballots returned would be honored with induction to the Hall.

Results were announced on January 11, 2000. A total of 499 ballots were returned so 375 votes were required for election. A total of 2813 individual votes were cast, an average of 5.64 per ballot. Candidates who received less than 5% support, or 25 votes, would not appear on future BBWAA ballots (*). They were also eliminated from future consideration by the Veterans Committee of the time, but that possibility was restored by new arrangements passed in 2001 and eligibility for the Veterans Committee ballot remains unrelated to performance in BBWAA elections after subsequent reforms.

Two players were elected and 15 with final games played during 1981–94 were forwarded to next year.

Player	Votes	Percent	Change	Year
**Carlton Fisk**	**397**	**79.6**	▲13.2%	2nd
**Tony Pérez**	**385**	**77.2**	▲16.4%	9th
Jim Rice	257	51.2	▲21.8%	6th
Gary Carter	248	49.7	▲15.9%	3rd
Bruce Sutter	192	38.5	▲14.2%	7th
Goose Gossage†	166	33.3	-	1st
Steve Garvey	160	32.1	▲1.9%	8th
Tommy John	135	27.1	▲8.4%	6th
Jim Kaat	125	25.1	▲5.0%	12th
Dale Murphy	116	23.2	▲3.9%	2nd
Jack Morris†	111	22.2	-	1st
Dave Parker	104	20.8	▲4.7%	4th
Bert Blyleven	87	17.4	▲3.3%	3rd
Luis Tiant	86	17.2	▲6.5%	13th
Dave Concepción	67	13.4	▲1.5%	7th
Keith Hernandez	52	10.4	▲3.6%	5th
Ron Guidry	44	8.8	▲2.6%	7th
Jeff Reardon†*	24	4.8	-	1st
Bob Boone*	21	4.2	▼1.2%	5th
Willie Wilson†*	10	2.0	-	1st
Rick Sutcliffe†*	9	1.8	-	1st
Kent Hrbek†*	5	1.0	-	1st
Charlie Hough†*	4	0.8	-	1st
Dave Henderson†*	2	0.4	-	1st
Steve Sax†*	2	0.4	-	1st
Bill Gullickson†*	1	0.2	-	1st
Bruce Hurst†*	1	0.2	-	1st
Lonnie Smith†*	1	0.2	-	1st
Bob Welch†*	1	0.2	-	1st
Hubie Brooks†*	0	0.0	-	1st

Key
	Elected to the Hall of Fame on this ballot (named in **bold italics**).
	Elected subsequently, as of 2025 (named in plain italics).
	Renominated for the 2001 BBWAA election by adequate performance on this ballot and has not been elected, as of 2025.
	Eliminated from annual BBWAA consideration by poor performance or expiration on this ballot and has not been elected, as of 2025.
†	First time on the BBWAA ballot.
*	Eliminated from annual BBWAA consideration by poor performance or expiration on this ballot.

The newly-eligible players included 16 All-Stars, three who were not included on the ballot, representing a total of 43 All-Star selections. Among the new candidates were 9-time All-Star Goose Gossage and 5-time All-Stars Steve Sax and Jack Morris. The field included two Rookies of the Year (Sax and Rick Sutcliffe) and two Cy Young Award winners (Sutcliffe and Bob Welch).

Players eligible for the first time who were not included on the ballot were: Larry Andersen, Daryl Boston, Sid Bream, Tom Brunansky, Storm Davis, Steve Farr, Mike Felder, Joe Hesketh, Jay Howell, Mike Jeffcoat, Tim Leary, Craig Lefferts, Kevin McReynolds, Bob Melvin, Edwin Núñez, Bob Ojeda, Junior Ortiz, Dan Pasqua, Gary Redus, and Harold Reynolds.

== Veterans Committee ==
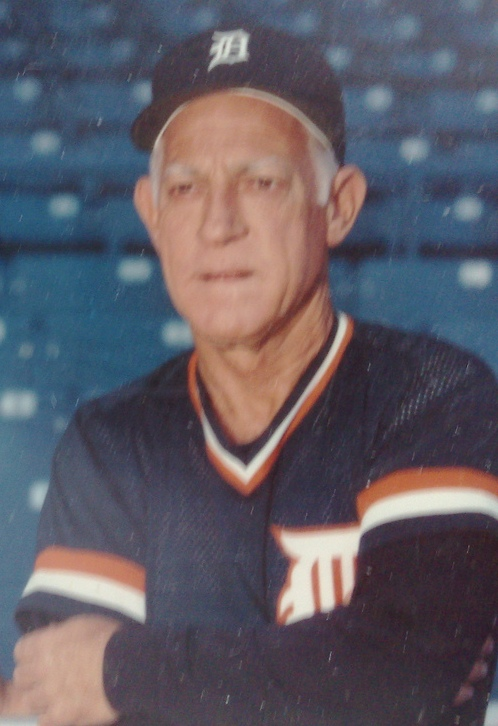
2000 Veterans Committee inductees Sparky Anderson (left) and Bid McPhee. Turkey Stearnes was also inducted.

The Veterans Committee met in closed sessions to elect as many as two executives, managers, umpires, and older major league players—the categories considered in all its meetings since 1953.

The older players eligible were those with ten major league seasons beginning 1945 or earlier; those who received at least 100 votes from the BBWAA in some election up to 1990; and those who received at least 60% support in some election beginning 1991. Players on Major League Baseball's ineligible list were also ineligible for election.

By an arrangement since 1995 the committee separately considered candidates from the Negro leagues and from the 19th century with authority to select one from each of those two special ballots. It elected three people, one fewer than the maximum number permitted: manager Sparky Anderson from the 1970s, center fielder Turkey Stearnes from the Negro leagues, and second baseman Bid McPhee from the 19th century.

== J. G. Taylor Spink Award ==
Hal Lebovitz received the J. G. Taylor Spink Award honoring a baseball writer. (The award was voted at the December 1999 meeting of the BBWAA, dated 1999, and conferred in the summer 2000 ceremonies.)

== Ford C. Frick Award ==
Marty Brennaman received the Ford C. Frick Award honoring a baseball broadcaster.
