= 1981 Baseball Hall of Fame balloting =

Elections to the Baseball Hall of Fame

National Baseball

Hall of Fame and Museum
- New inductees: 3
- via BBWAA: 1
- via Veterans Committee: 2
- Total inductees: 176
- Induction date: August 2, 1981

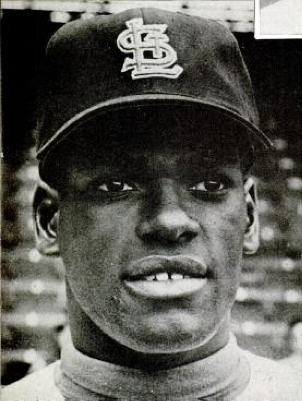
1981 BBWAA inductee Bob Gibson

Elections to the Baseball Hall of Fame for 1981 followed the system in place since 1978. The Baseball Writers' Association of America (BBWAA) voted by mail to select from recent major league players and elected Bob Gibson. The Veterans Committee met in closed sessions to consider older major league players as well as managers, umpires, executives, and figures from the Negro leagues. It selected Rube Foster and Johnny Mize. Foster would be one of two people from the Negro leagues elected in seventeen years, before introduction of a separate ballot in 1995. A formal induction ceremony was held in Cooperstown, New York, on August 2, 1981, with Commissioner of Baseball Bowie Kuhn presiding.

== BBWAA election ==
The BBWAA was authorized to elect players active in 1961 or later, but not after 1975; the ballot included candidates from the 1980 ballot who received at least 5% of the vote but were not elected, along with selected players, chosen by a screening committee, whose last appearance was in 1975. All 10-year members of the BBWAA were eligible to vote.

Voters were instructed to cast votes for up to 10 candidates; any candidate receiving votes on at least 75% of the ballots would be honored with induction to the Hall. Results of the 1981 election by the BBWAA were announced on January 15. The ballot consisted of 39 players; a total of 401 ballots were cast, with 301 votes required for election. A total of 3,026 individual votes were cast, an average of 7.55 per ballot. Those candidates receiving less than 5% of the vote will not appear on future BBWAA ballots, but may eventually be considered by the Veterans Committee.

Candidates who were eligible for the first time are indicated here with a dagger (†). The one candidate who received at least 75% of the vote and were elected is indicated in bold italics; candidates who have since been elected in subsequent elections are indicated in italics. The 17 candidates who received less than 5% of the vote, thus becoming ineligible for future BBWAA consideration, are indicated with an asterisk (*).

Ted Kluszewski was on the ballot for the 15th and final time.

Player	Votes	Percent	Change
**Bob Gibson**†	337	84.0	-
Don Drysdale	243	60.6	▼1.2%
Gil Hodges	241	60.0	▲0.3%
Harmon Killebrew†	239	59.6	-
Hoyt Wilhelm	238	59.4	▲5.1%
Juan Marichal†	233	58.1	-
Nellie Fox	168	41.9	▲0.1%
Red Schoendienst	166	41.4	▼1.2%
Jim Bunning	164	40.9	▼5.1%
Maury Wills	163	40.6	▲2.7%
Luis Aparicio	148	36.9	▲4.7%
Richie Ashburn	142	35.4	▲0.6%
Roger Maris	94	23.4	▼5.4%
Harvey Kuenn	93	23.2	▲1.6%
Elston Howard	83	20.7	▲13.2%
Orlando Cepeda	77	19.2	▲6.7%
Thurman Munson†	62	15.5	-
Ted Kluszewski	56	14.0	▲1.0%
Lew Burdette	48	12.0	▼5.7%
Bill Mazeroski	38	9.5	▲0.9%
Don Larsen	33	8.2	▲0.1%
Roy Face	23	5.7	▲0.2%
Vada Pinson†*	18	4.5	-
Jim Perry†*	6	1.5	-
Dave McNally†*	5	1.2	-
Claude Osteen†*	2	0.5	-
Glenn Beckert†*	1	0.2	-
Gates Brown†*	1	0.2	-
Leo Cárdenas†*	1	0.2	-
Lindy McDaniel†*	1	0.2	-
Jim Northrup†*	1	0.2	-
Sonny Siebert†*	1	0.2	-
Ken Berry†*	0	0.0	-
Johnny Briggs†*	0	0.0	-
Bill Hands†*	0	0.0	-
Bobby Locke†*	0	0.0	-
Dal Maxvill†*	0	0.0	-
Dick McAuliffe†*	0	0.0	-
Sam McDowell†*	0	0.0	-

Key to colors
Elected to the Hall. These individuals are also indicated in **bold italics**.
Players who were elected in future elections. These individuals are also indicated in plain italics.
Players not yet elected who returned on the 1982 ballot.
Eliminated from future BBWAA voting. These individuals remain eligible for future Veterans Committee consideration.

The newly-eligible players included 18 All-Stars, three of whom were not included on the ballot, representing a total of 71 All-Star selections. Among the new candidates were 11-time All-Star Harmon Killebrew, 9-time All-Star Juan Marichal, 8-time All-Star Bob Gibson, 7-time All-Star Thurman Munson and 5-time All-Star Leo Cárdenas. The field included three MVPs (Gibson, Killebrew and Munson), two Cy Young Award winners (Bob Gibson, who won twice while receiving MVP in one of those years, and Jim Perry) and one Rookie of the Year (Munson).

Players eligible for the first time who were not included on the ballot were: Ed Brinkman, Danny Cater, Tom Egan, Bob Locker, Tommy McCraw, Jim Merritt, Gene Michael, Orlando Peña, Paul Popovich, Eddie Watt, Walt Williams and Clyde Wright.

== J. G. Taylor Spink Award ==
Joe Reichler (1915–1988) and Milton Richman (1922–1986) received the J. G. Taylor Spink Award honoring baseball writers. The awards were voted at the December 1980 meeting of the BBWAA, and included in the summer 1981 ceremonies.
