= 1982 Baseball Hall of Fame balloting =

Elections to the Baseball Hall of Fame

National Baseball

Hall of Fame and Museum
- New inductees: 4
- via BBWAA: 2
- via Veterans Committee: 2
- Total inductees: 180
- Induction date: August 1, 1982

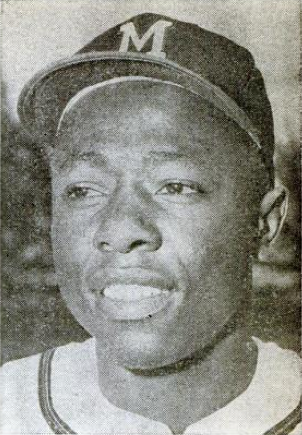
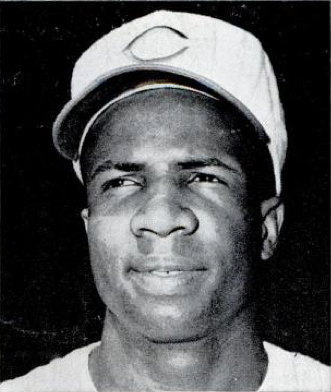
1982 BBWAA inductees Hank Aaron (left) and Frank Robinson

Elections to the Baseball Hall of Fame for 1982 followed the system in place since 1978. The Baseball Writers' Association of America (BBWAA) voted by mail to select from recent major league players and elected two, Hank Aaron and Frank Robinson. The Veterans Committee met in closed sessions to consider older major league players as well as managers, umpires, executives, and figures from the Negro leagues. It selected the second Commissioner of Baseball, Happy Chandler, and former New York Giants shortstop Travis Jackson. A formal induction ceremony was held in Cooperstown, New York, on August 1, 1982, with the current Commissioner of Baseball, Bowie Kuhn, presiding.

== BBWAA election ==
The BBWAA was authorized to elect players active in 1962 or later, but not after 1976; the ballot included candidates from the 1981 ballot who received at least 5% of the vote but were not elected, along with selected players, chosen by a screening committee, whose last appearance was in 1976. All 10-year members of the BBWAA were eligible to vote.

Voters were instructed to cast votes for up to 10 candidates; any candidate receiving votes on at least 75% of the ballots would be honored with induction to the Hall. Results of the 1982 election by the BBWAA were announced on January 13. The ballot consisted of 42 players; a total of 415 ballots were cast, with 312 votes required for election. A total of 3,344 individual votes were cast, an average of 8.06 per ballot. Those candidates receiving less than 5% of the vote will not appear on future BBWAA ballots but may eventually be considered by the Veterans Committee.

Candidates who were eligible for the first time are indicated here with a dagger (†). The two candidates who received at least 75% of the vote and were elected is indicated in bold italics; candidates who have since been elected in subsequent elections are indicated in italics. The 18 candidates who received less than 5% of the vote, thus becoming ineligible for future BBWAA consideration, are indicated with an asterisk (*).

Player	Votes	Percent	Change
**Hank Aaron**†	406	97.8	-
**Frank Robinson**†	370	89.2	-
Juan Marichal	305	73.5	▲15.4%
Harmon Killebrew	246	59.3	▼0.3%
Hoyt Wilhelm	236	56.9	▼2.5%
Don Drysdale	233	56.1	▼4.5%
Gil Hodges	205	49.4	▼10.7%
Luis Aparicio	174	41.9	▲5.0%
Jim Bunning	138	33.3	▼7.6%
Red Schoendienst	135	32.5	▼8.9%
Nellie Fox	127	30.6	▼11.3%
Richie Ashburn	126	30.4	▼5.0%
Billy Williams†	97	23.4	-
Maury Wills	91	21.9	▼18.7%
Roger Maris	69	16.6	▼6.8%
Tony Oliva†	63	15.2	-
Harvey Kuenn	62	14.9	▼8.3%
Lew Burdette	43	10.4	▼1.6%
Orlando Cepeda	42	10.1	▼9.1%
Elston Howard	40	9.6	▼11.1%
Don Larsen	32	7.7	▼0.5%
Bill Mazeroski	28	6.7	▼2.8%
Thurman Munson	26	6.3	▼9.2%
Roy Face	22	5.3	▼0.4%
Vada Pinson*	6	1.4	▼3.1%
Tommy Davis†*	5	1.2	-
Dave McNally*	5	1.2	-
Lindy McDaniel*	3	0.7	▲0.5%
Rico Petrocelli†*	3	0.7	-
Jim Brewer†*	2	0.5	-
Bill Freehan†*	2	0.5	-
Leo Cárdenas*	1	0.2	-
Claude Osteen*	1	0.2	-
Gates Brown*	0	0.0	-
Tommy Harper†*	0	0.0	-
Alex Johnson†*	0	0.0	-
Deron Johnson†*	0	0.0	-
Cleon Jones†*	0	0.0	-
Jim Northrup*	0	0.0	-
Sonny Siebert*	0	0.0	-
Tony Taylor†*	0	0.0	-
César Tovar†*	0	0.0	-

Key to colors
Elected to the Hall. These individuals are also indicated in **bold italics**.
Players who were elected in future elections. These individuals are also indicated in plain italics.
Players not yet elected who returned on the 1983 ballot.
Eliminated from future BBWAA voting. These individuals remain eligible for future Veterans Committee consideration.

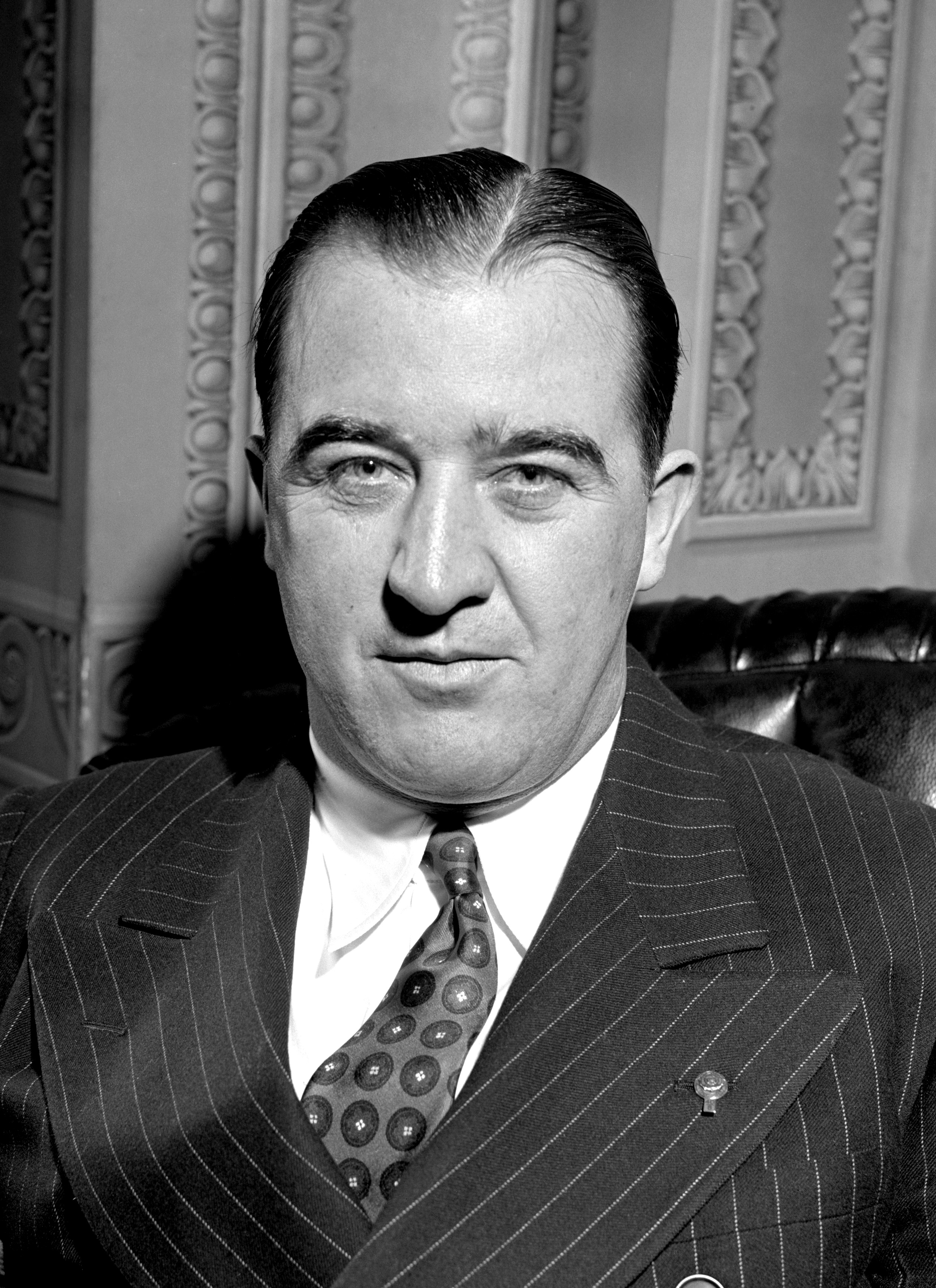
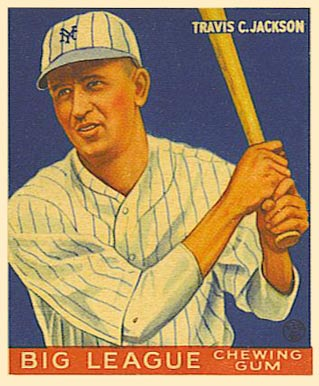
1982 Veterans Committee inductees Happy Chandler (left) and Travis Jackson

The newly-eligible players included 17 All-Stars, two of whom were not included on the ballot, representing a total of 74 All-Star selections. Among the new candidates were 21-time All-Star Hank Aaron, 12-time All-Star Frank Robinson, 11-time All-Star Bill Freehan, 9-time All-Star Tony Oliva and 6-time All-Star Billy Williams. The field included two MVPs (Aaron and Frank Robinson, who won one in each league), and three Rookies of the Year (Oliva, Robinson and Williams).

Players eligible for the first time who were not included on the ballot were: Dick Bosman, Buddy Bradford, Nate Colbert, Dave Duncan, Alan Foster, Danny Frisella, Ted Kubiak, Bob Moose, Blue Moon Odom, Fritz Peterson, and Ken Sanders.

== J. G. Taylor Spink Award ==
Allen Lewis (1916–2003) and Bob Addie (1910–1982) received the J. G. Taylor Spink Award honoring baseball writers. The awards were voted at the December 1981 meeting of the BBWAA, and included in the summer 1982 ceremonies.
