= 1946 Baseball Hall of Fame balloting =

Elections to the Baseball Hall of Fame

National Baseball

Hall of Fame and Museum
- New inductees: 11
- via Old Timers Committee: 11
- Total inductees: 49
- Induction date: July 21, 1947

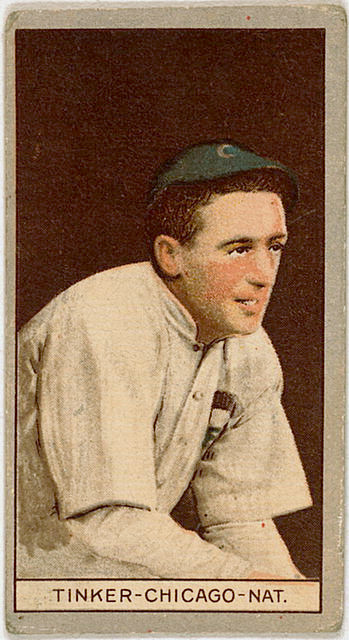
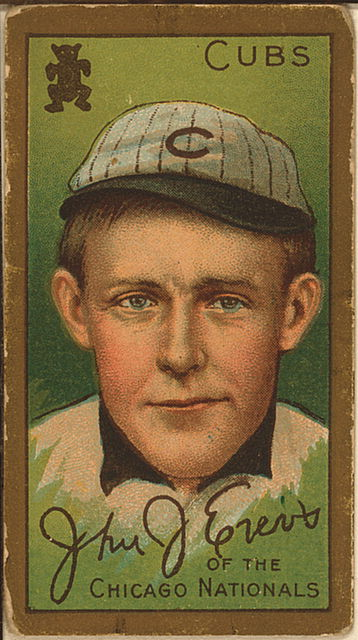
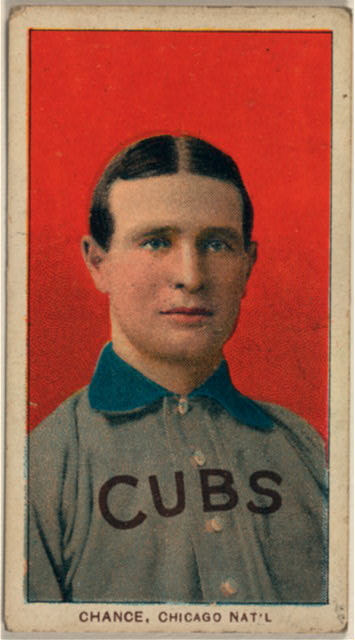
Three of the players elected in 1946 (L-R): Joe Tinker, Johnny Evers, and Frank Chance, the subject of "Baseball's Sad Lexicon"

Elections to the Baseball Hall of Fame for 1946 were conducted by methods refashioned and then fashioned again during the year. As in 1945, the Baseball Writers' Association of America (BBWAA) voted by mail to select from recent players, and elected no one. Also, as in 1945, the Old Timers Committee responded by electing the biggest class yet, then 10 and now 11 people: Jesse Burkett, Frank Chance, Jack Chesbro, Johnny Evers, Clark Griffith, Tommy McCarthy, Joe McGinnity, Eddie Plank, Joe Tinker, Rube Waddell, and Ed Walsh.

The election of the 11 players was announced in April 1946. At that time, Burkett, Evers, Griffith, Tinker, and Walsh were still living. The June 13, 1946, induction ceremony in Cooperstown, New York, honored former Commissioner of Baseball Kenesaw Mountain Landis, who had been elected to the Hall of Fame shortly after his death in late 1944. The players elected in 1946 were inducted—along with players elected the following year—on July 21, 1947, in Cooperstown. Johnny Evers had died in March 1947, and of the four inductees still living, only Ed Walsh was at the ceremony.

Most of those "old timers" were star players from the 1900s and 1910s rather than the 19th century. Afterward, the jurisdiction of the BBWAA was formally reduced to cover only players who retired during the last 25 years; for the 1947 election, those would be players active in 1922 and later. Perhaps the relatively narrow scope would help the writers concentrate their votes on a few candidates. To make certain, the rules for 1947 provided for a runoff ballot in case of no winner on the first ballot. Also, on December 3, 1946, the BBWAA limited voting to writers who had been members for at least 10 years.

== BBWAA election ==
Because the Baseball Writers' Association of America (BBWAA) had failed to elect any candidates in 1945, and had elected only one player since 1939, the previous delay of three years between elections had been eliminated in September 1945 by the Hall of Fame Committee, and annual elections restored. In response to the high number of candidates drawing votes in the 1945 election, a two-step ballot process was created to narrow the field for a final vote. The first ballot would proceed in the same manner as previous elections, with voters free to name any 10 candidates. However, there would be no possibility of any inductees being elected in this vote; instead, the top 20 candidates would proceed to a final ballot. In order for any candidate to be elected, at least 200 ballots would have to be cast in each phase of the election.

In addition to the field being narrowed in this manner, it was hoped that the absence of several previously popular candidates would clear the way for others; the 10 players elected by the Old-Timers Committee in 1945 had received 26% of the vote in the last BBWAA election, and had included seven of the top 16 candidates. It was hoped that the revised approach and reduced field of candidates would result in up to five new members of the Hall annually.

=== Nominating stage ===
Members of the BBWAA again had the authority to select any players active in the 20th century (after 1900), provided they had not appeared in a major league game in 1945. Voters were instructed to cast votes for 10 candidates. The top 20 candidates would advance to the final ballot, but the vote totals from the first ballot would not be revealed until the second election was over.

In addition, the Hall of Fame Committee had instituted a set of criteria for the voters to observe in completing their ballot; for each candidate, they were to take into consideration:

1. playing ability
2. integrity
3. sportsmanship
4. character
5. contribution to the team on which they played and to baseball in general.

A total of 202 ballots were cast, with 1,948 individual votes for 76 specific candidates, an average of 9.64 per ballot; due to a tie for 20th place, the top 21 candidates (those who had received 39 or more votes) were announced on January 3, 1946, and advanced to the final ballot.

Even following the previous year's election of several players from that era, the emphasis on the stars of the 1900s and 1910s – who many voters felt should be given priority – was again evident, although not quite at the levels seen previously. Only five of the top 14 candidates in the voting, and none of the top five, had seen any substantial play since 1917; only two of the top 26, and none of the top 19, had played their final season anytime between 1918 and 1933. Players who had been retired over 28 years—35 of the 76 named—received 53% of the votes. No player received 75% of the vote in this stage; even if the rules had allowed a selection at this point, none would have occurred.

Individuals who were barred from baseball were still not officially ineligible. Shoeless Joe Jackson received two votes; this was the first time since 1937 that anyone who had been thrown out of baseball had received any votes, and it would be the last time any such candidate received any recognized votes. Candidates who have since been selected in subsequent elections are indicated in italics; players selected by the Old-Timers Committee in 1946 are marked with an asterisk (*).

Player	Votes	Percent	Change
Frank Chance*	144	71.3	▼1.2%
Johnny Evers*	130	64.4	▲10.1%
Miller Huggins	129	63.9	▲10.1%
Rube Waddell*	122	60.4	▼1.9%
Ed Walsh*	115	56.9	▲1.4%
Frankie Frisch	104	51.5	▲10.6%
Carl Hubbell	101	50.0	▲40.3%
Mickey Cochrane	80	39.6	▼11.0%
Clark Griffith*	73	36.1	▼7.6%
Lefty Grove	71	35.1	▲23.8%
Pie Traynor	65	32.2	▼0.6%
Mordecai Brown	56	27.7	▲9.1%
Joe Tinker*	55	27.2	▲7.4%
Joe McGinnity*	53	26.2	▲8.4%
Rabbit Maranville	50	24.8	▲4.2%
Charlie Gehringer	43	21.3	▲17.3%
Herb Pennock	41	20.3	▲2.1%
Dizzy Dean	40	19.8	▲12.9%
Bill Dickey	40	19.8	▲12.9%
Frank Baker	39	19.3	▲8.8%
Chief Bender	39	19.3	▲3.1%
Ray Schalk	36	17.8	▲4.4%
Eddie Plank*	34	16.8	▲3.4%
Bill Terry	31	15.3	▲2.3%
Dazzy Vance	31	15.3	▲8.0%
Jimmie Foxx	26	12.9	-
Ross Youngs	25	12.4	▲3.5%
Harry Heilmann	23	11.4	▲9.4%
Johnny Kling	20	9.9	▲5.0%
Addie Joss	14	6.9	▼2.4%
Nap Rucker	13	6.4	▲2.4%
Edd Roush	11	5.4	▲3.4%
Sam Crawford	9	4.5	▲2.9%
Babe Adams	6	3.0	▲0.2%
Lou Criger	6	3.0	-
Rube Marquard	6	3.0	-
Zack Wheat	6	3.0	▲2.2%
"Smoky Joe" Wood	5	2.5	-
"Wild Bill" Donovan	4	2.0	▲0.8%
Lefty Gomez	4	2.0	▼0.8%
Paul Waner	4	2.0	-
Ted Lyons	3	1.5	▼0.1%
Jesse Burkett*	2	1.0	▲0.2%
Donie Bush	2	1.0	▲0.6%
Jack Coombs	2	1.0	-
Harry Davis	2	1.0	▲0.6%
Gabby Hartnett	2	1.0	▲0.2%
Shoeless Joe Jackson	2	1.0	-
Bill McKechnie	2	1.0	▲0.2%
Dave Bancroft	1	0.5	-
Ginger Beaumont	1	0.5	▲0.1%
Bill Bradley	1	0.5	-
Jack Chesbro*	1	0.5	-
John Clarkson	1	0.5	-
Gavvy Cravath	1	0.5	-
Bill Dinneen	1	0.5	▲0.1%
Jack Dunn	1	0.5	▲0.1%
Eddie Grant	1	0.5	▼0.3%
Charlie Grimm	1	0.5	▲0.1%
Waite Hoyt	1	0.5	-
Fielder Jones	1	0.5	-
Bill Killefer	1	0.5	-
Otto Knabe	1	0.5	-
Herman Long	1	0.5	▲0.1%
Sherry Magee	1	0.5	▲0.1%
Pepper Martin	1	0.5	▲0.1%
Kid Nichols	1	0.5	▼1.5%
Deacon Phillippe	1	0.5	▼0.3%
Muddy Ruel	1	0.5	-
Jimmy Sheckard	1	0.5	▲0.1%
Al Simmons	1	0.5	-
Billy Southworth	1	0.5	▲0.1%
Tully Sparks	1	0.5	-
Billy Sullivan	1	0.5	-
Jesse Tannehill	1	0.5	▲0.1%
Fred Tenney	1	0.5	-

Players who were elected in future elections. These individuals are also indicated in plain italics.

=== Final ballot ===
The 21 final candidates were listed on the ballot in alphabetical order, as their vote totals in the first round had not been revealed. Because no more than five selections were desired at this time, voters were restricted to voting for their top five choices; this, of course, did not allow for the fact that candidates were less likely to be among a voter's top five choices than they were to be among his top ten, thus making any selections less probable than they otherwise might have been. A total of 263 ballots were cast, with 1318 individual votes for the 21 candidates; 198 votes were required for election. The results were announced on January 23, 1946.

For the second year in a row, no candidate gained the necessary number of votes, with none even coming within 40 of the required total. As might have been mathematically projected, every candidate got a lower percentage of the vote than they had received on the nomination ballot. As a result of the restriction to five choices, only four candidates received even half the necessary votes for election. Again, an emphasis on the earliest candidates was evident; the top six candidates were all retired by 1917, while the bottom four were all active in 1934 or later, with the eleven candidates who were retired over 23 years receiving 65% of the vote.

The continuing inability to elect anyone created an even greater clamor for radical revision of the selection method. Some suggested that perhaps a lower threshold than 75% was advisable; others proposed that the final ballot should include only ten names, with voters choosing the top five. The Hall of Fame Committee, meeting in April and again in December, found it necessary to again overhaul the election method.

All of the candidates on the ballot were elected by 1955, with the exception of manager Miller Huggins, who was elected in 1964.

Player	Votes	Percent	Change
Frank Chance	150	57.0	▼14.3%
Johnny Evers	110	41.8	▼22.6%
Miller Huggins	106	40.3	▼23.6%
Ed Walsh	106	40.3	▼16.6%
Rube Waddell	87	33.1	▼27.3%
Clark Griffith	82	31.2	▼4.9%
Carl Hubbell	75	28.5	▼21.5%
Frankie Frisch	67	25.5	▼26.0%
Mickey Cochrane	65	24.7	▼14.9%
Lefty Grove	61	23.2	▼11.9%
Pie Traynor	53	20.2	▼12.0%
Mordecai Brown	48	18.3	▼9.4%
Joe McGinnity	47	17.9	▼8.3%
Dizzy Dean	45	17.1	▼2.7%
Joe Tinker	45	17.1	▼10.1%
Frank Baker	36	13.7	▼5.6%
Chief Bender	35	13.3	▼6.0%
Bill Dickey	32	12.2	▼7.6%
Rabbit Maranville	29	11.0	▼13.8%
Charlie Gehringer	23	8.7	▼12.6%
Herb Pennock	16	6.1	▼14.2%

== Old-Timers Committee ==
After its 1945 selections, the committee had intended to review the pitchers from the pre-1910 era and to also re-focus on the earlier 19th century players; but after the BBWAA had failed to select any inductees for the second year in a row, and with only one player chosen by the BBWAA since 1939, it was generally accepted that a dramatic revision of the election process by the Hall of Fame Committee was necessary. The committee firmly agreed that any flaws in the rules were causing errors of omission rather than ones of liberality in selections, and that the wide field of candidates from the entire 20th century was making it unlikely that any candidate could draw 75% of the vote from the BBWAA.

The committee members were: Hall of Fame president Stephen C. Clark, who chaired the committee; Hall of Fame treasurer Paul S. Kerr, the committee secretary; former Yankees president Ed Barrow; Athletics owner/manager Connie Mack; former Braves president Bob Quinn; and Boston sportswriter Mel Webb. New York sportswriter Harry Cross, who had been named in February to fill the vacancy created by the death of Sid Mercer, also died, on April 4. On April 23, the members of the committee met in New York City to consider their selections and to make further revisions in the election process. In May, Grantland Rice was named to fill the vacancy on the committee, and another major revision in the BBWAA voting process was enacted at their meeting in December.

=== Selections ===
The committee determined that the candidates from the early part of the century were gaining the most support, but would likely never reach the necessary threshold of 75% because many younger writers were reluctant to vote for players about whom they had limited first-hand knowledge. In 1945 the committee had believed that only a handful of those early candidates whose careers bridged the turn of the century needed to be removed from BBWAA consideration in order to facilitate elections; they were now more certain that they needed to select players whose careers began after 1900, and extended through the 1910s, in order to break the deadlock in the BBWAA voting. There was even some support on the committee from eliminating the BBWAA from the process entirely, due to their inability for several years to agree on appropriate inductees.

The committee selected 11 inductees – five of whom were still living – including the first two left-handed pitchers to reach the Hall. They were formally inducted on July 21, 1947, with National League president Ford Frick officiating; however, of the four still living at that time (Johnny Evers died in the interim), only Ed Walsh attended the ceremonies:

- Jesse Burkett, a left fielder who played primarily for Cleveland and St. Louis from 1890 to 1905; he compiled a .338 career batting average, hitting over .400 twice and winning three batting titles. His 240 hits in 1896 stand as the 19th century record, and his 2850 career hits ranked behind only Cap Anson's total upon his retirement. His ability to foul off pitches was a factor in baseball's move to count fouls as strikes. He later won four pennants as a minor league manager before coaching at Holy Cross and then becoming a scout for the New York Giants.
- Frank Chance, the first baseman and manager, known as the "Peerless Leader", of the great Chicago Cubs teams from 1898 to 1912. The team won four pennants in five seasons from 1906 to 1910, winning a record 116 games in 1906 for a .763 winning percentage. He was widely considered baseball's best right-handed first baseman, and remains the only player at that position to steal 400 bases. He later managed the Yankees and Red Sox, and had been hired to manage the White Sox before dying at age 47.
- Jack Chesbro, a spitball pitcher from 1899 to 1909, winning 198 games. His 41 wins in 1904 stand as the modern record, and he won over 20 three other times. He led both leagues once each in wins and winning percentage.
- Johnny Evers, the star second baseman on the Cubs and Boston Braves from 1902 to 1917, he was named the NL's Most Valuable Player in 1914 with the "Miracle Braves." Arriving in the majors when he weighed under 100 pounds (45 kg), he was consistently one of the sport's most dynamic figures, and his alertness helped capture the 1908 pennant with a famous defensive move. He was a manager or coach for four teams from 1920 to 1932, later working as a scout.
- Clark Griffith, a pitcher who won 237 games between 1891 and 1906, collecting over 20 wins seven times. He managed four teams from 1901 to 1920, winning the first AL pennant with the White Sox; he not only managed the Washington Senators from 1912 to 1920, but became the majority owner of the team from 1919 until his death in 1955.
- Tommy McCarthy, an outfielder and excellent baserunner from 1884 to 1896 who played a notable role on the Boston teams of the early 1890s. Along with center fielder Hugh Duffy, he was known as one of the "Heavenly Twins" for his defensive ability. He also played a part in developing important aspects of defensive strategy and team signals.
- Joe McGinnity, a pitcher from 1899 to 1908 who won over 20 games eight times, and over 30 twice. Known as "Iron Man" for his durability and stamina, he pitched complete double-headers five times, including three times in one month, and once won five games in six days. He won nearly 500 games in a professional career which lasted until he was in his fifties.
- Eddie Plank, a left-handed pitcher from 1901 to 1917, primarily with the Philadelphia Athletics, he won 20 games eight times and was a mainstay of the pitching staff on six pennant winners. He was the first left-hander to win 200 games, and kept going until he finished with 326 victories – the most by a left-hander until 1962, and still the AL record.
- Joe Tinker, shortstop on the Cubs from 1902 to 1912 and a daring baserunner, later the player-manager of the Chicago Federal League team, winning that league's pennant in 1915. The defensive standout led the NL in fielding average four times. After retiring as a player, he became a minor league manager and executive, and a scout for the Cubs.
- Rube Waddell, a pitcher from 1897 to 1910, the unpredictable left-handed pitcher starred for the Athletics from 1902 to 1907; he set numerous strikeout records, leading the AL in each of his seasons with the A's and notching a record 349 in 1904. Out of the major leagues at 33, he died at the age of 37.
- Ed Walsh, a spitball pitcher from 1904 to 1917, almost all with the Chicago White Sox, he peaked from 1906 to 1912 when he won 24 games or more four times, including 40 wins in 1908. His career ERA of 1.82 remains the lowest in major league history. He played a major role on the 1906 "Hitless Wonders" which won the World Series, and pitched a no-hitter in 1911. He was later an AL umpire for one year, and then coached the Sox for several seasons.

The committee had followed up on its intent to review most of the popular pitching candidates of the era, but took no further action on the candidacies, proposed one year earlier, of Abner Doubleday and Franklin Roosevelt. They also took no action on additional stars such as Jim "Deacon" White from the era before 1890, an area in which selections had continually been postponed.

=== Honor Rolls of Baseball ===
The Hall of Fame Committee also announced the creation of the Honor Rolls of Baseball, which would be displayed at the museum, featuring the names of significant non-players in four areas. This second-tier list consisted of five managers, 11 umpires, 11 executives and 12 sportswriters. These contributors were not designated as official Hall of Fame members, so plaques on the wall were not authorized, as they were reserved only for those outstanding players, along with certain pioneers of the game.

- Executives: Ernest Barnard, Ed Barrow, John E. Bruce, John T. Brush, Barney Dreyfuss, Charles Ebbets, August Herrmann, John Heydler, Bob Quinn, Arthur Soden, Nicholas Young
- Managers: Bill Carrigan, Ned Hanlon, Miller Huggins, Frank Selee, John Montgomery Ward
- Umpires: Tom Connolly, Bill Dinneen, Bob Emslie, Billy Evans, John Gaffney, Tim Hurst, Kick Kelly, Bill Klem, Thomas Lynch, Silk O'Loughlin, Jack Sheridan
- Sportswriters: Walter Barnes, Harry Cross, William B. Hanna, Frank Hough, Sid Mercer, Tim Murnane, Francis Richter, Irving Sanborn, John B. Sheridan, William J. Slocum, George Tidden, Joe Vila

Of the 39 honorees, eight were still living: Barrow (died 1953), Carrigan (d. 1969), Connolly (d. 1961), Dinneen (d. 1955), Evans (d. 1956), Heydler (d. 1956), Klem (d. 1951), and Quinn (d. 1954).

The committee was clear that anyone named to the Honor Rolls would still be eligible for induction to the Hall of Fame, per the Hall's selection processes. Of those named to the Honor Rolls of Baseball, nine have subsequently been inducted to the Hall of Fame, all through selection of the Veterans Committee:

- Ed Barrow (1953)
- Tom Connolly (1953)
- Barney Dreyfuss (2008)
- Billy Evans (1973)
- Ned Hanlon (1996)
- Miller Huggins (1964)
- Bill Klem (1953)
- Frank Selee (1999)
- John Montgomery Ward (1964)

Additionally, two sportswriters named to the Honor Rolls have subsequently been awarded the BBWAA Career Excellence Award (previously known as the J. G. Taylor Spink Award): Sid Mercer (1969) and Tim Murnane (1978).

=== Criticism and rationale ===
Whereas the committee's 1945 selections met with criticism only in later years, complaints regarding their moves in 1946 began more immediately. The committee had not yet outlined the revised voting rules for BBWAA elections, and many observers felt that the BBWAA's privilege of selecting 20th century players was being infringed. It was widely suggested that the committee should either reform the BBWAA's voting rules or eliminate the writers entirely from the process; it was also noted that there was still plenty of work for the committee in selecting further 19th century inductees. Criticism was also directed at the Honor Rolls, which had been created by the committee without any popular request; many felt that the Roll was a backhanded, secondary honor for individuals who had perhaps earned full membership in the Hall, and that the committee had simply established it as an excuse for inaction regarding non-playing candidates. It was further noted that managers (Connie Mack), executives (Ban Johnson), sportswriters (Henry Chadwick) and pioneers (Alexander Cartwright) were already included among the Hall's members, indicating that it had not been intended as an honor solely for players. Probably as a result of this criticism, there were never any additions to the Honor Rolls.

Specific, individual criticism regarding the 11 inductees selected by the committee was not as immediate, although the choices included some which have come to be met with greater disapproval than any of the 1945 choices; McCarthy has been described as the worst player in the Hall of Fame. Again, it is reasonably clear to discern the several factors which the committee likely found most important in making their selections in both 1945 and 1946:

1. The committee's primary focus in both years was dealing with the failure of two consecutive BBWAA elections. In helping to ease the BBWAA's task, they initially intended only to select popular candidates whose peak years were before 1905; but they later decided that clearing the BBWAA logjam would require that they forgo their earlier limitation to the 19th century, and cover the entire period before 1920. As a result, almost all of their 21 selections over the two years played in the 25-year period between 1893 (when baseball moved the pitcher back 10 feet from the plate) and 1917; all of their selections were active players in 1893 or later, with 11 playing their entire careers within that span. Only 4 enjoyed their peak years before 1893, including 3 selected in 1945: Dan Brouthers, Mike "King" Kelly, Jim O'Rourke, and the newly added Tommy McCarthy. Fully 17 were active after 1900, and 7 were active after 1910.
2. The committee was selecting the most popular candidates from the BBWAA voting; had they instead selected players who received scant support from the BBWAA, they would have been far more heavily criticized for overriding the writers' judgment. With their selections over two years, they had chosen 15 of the 18 candidates who had retired by 1920 and who had received at least 10% of the vote in either year's election; every non-pitcher retired before 1920 who had ever received over 10% of the BBWAA vote had now been elected to the Hall or (in Miller Huggins' case) named to the Roll of Honor. Jesse Burkett, also elected, was the only player retired before 1910 who received more than 1 vote in the 1946 election. 4 of the committee's other selections had retired before 1900 and were not eligible for BBWAA consideration. The BBWAA members who supported the selection of these inductees are more appropriate targets for criticism than the Old-Timers Committee, which was essentially confirming their votes; the committee elected the same candidates the BBWAA had been trying to elect.
3. Throughout this period, most voters and media observers supported the idea of choosing players who had remained in the sport as managers, coaches or executives after retiring. A majority of the selections were major league managers at some point, with eight leading their teams to pennants. Five of the inductees each served at least five seasons as coaches in the major leagues; Burkett and Hugh Duffy worked as scouts for several years. Every retired manager with over 1000 victories had now been either elected to the Hall or placed in the Roll of Honor. Here follow the names of the 21 managers who had won over 750 major league games prior to 1946, only 3 of whom were retired but had not yet received either recognition; those who had been selected by 1946 are shown in italics:
  1. Connie Mack – 3387 (active)
  2. John McGraw – 2763
  3. Joe McCarthy – 1880 (active) (elected by Veterans Committee, 1957)
  4. Bill McKechnie – 1832 (active) (elected by Veterans Committee, 1962)
  5. Fred Clarke – 1602
  6. Bucky Harris – 1456 (active) (elected by Veterans Committee, 1975)
  7. Clark Griffith – 1491
  8. Miller Huggins – 1413 (Roll of Honor) (elected by Veterans Committee, 1964)
  9. Wilbert Robinson – 1399
  10. Ned Hanlon – 1313 (Roll of Honor) (elected by Veterans Committee, 1996)
  11. Cap Anson – 1292
  12. Frank Selee – 1284 (Roll of Honor) (elected by Veterans Committee, 1999)
  13. Hughie Jennings – 1184
  14. Joe Cronin – 1049 (active) (elected by BBWAA, 1956)
  15. Harry Wright – 1000 (elected by Veterans Committee, 1953)
  16. Frank Chance – 946
  17. Frankie Frisch – 935 (active) (elected by BBWAA, 1947)
  18. Jimmy Dykes – 889 (active)
  19. George Stallings – 879
  20. Charles Comiskey – 839
  21. Bill Terry – 823 (elected by BBWAA, 1954)
4. The committee had elected players at positions which were not yet represented in the Hall. By 1945, the BBWAA had elected 20th century players at every position except catcher, third base and left field; these omissions were corrected through the elections of Roger Bresnahan, Jimmy Collins, and Fred Clarke respectively. The 1946 selections of Eddie Plank and Rube Waddell corrected the absence of any left-handed pitchers.
5. There was a strong emphasis on those who had played central roles on championship teams, particularly the 3-time champion Baltimore Orioles of 1894-95-96 (4 inducted members), and the powerhouse Chicago Cubs teams which won 4 pennants between 1906 and 1910 (3 inducted members). 16 of the 21 inductees had been regulars on a world championship team; all except Burkett and Ed Delahanty had played for a pennant winner. Of the 21 selections, 15 had been a starting player, manager or owner for at least three pennant winners.
6. The committee evidently chose to include players who had accomplished noteworthy feats in single seasons, particularly establishing single-season records (Jack Chesbro, Duffy and Waddell), and winning multiple batting titles (Brouthers, Burkett, Delahanty).
7. The committee included groups of players who were closely associated with one another in baseball lore, such as Chicago's infield combination of Tinker, Evers and Chance, and Boston's "Heavenly Twins" outfield in the early 1890s of Duffy and McCarthy.
