= Honor Rolls of Baseball =

Second level of induction designed to recognize non-playing contributors in baseball

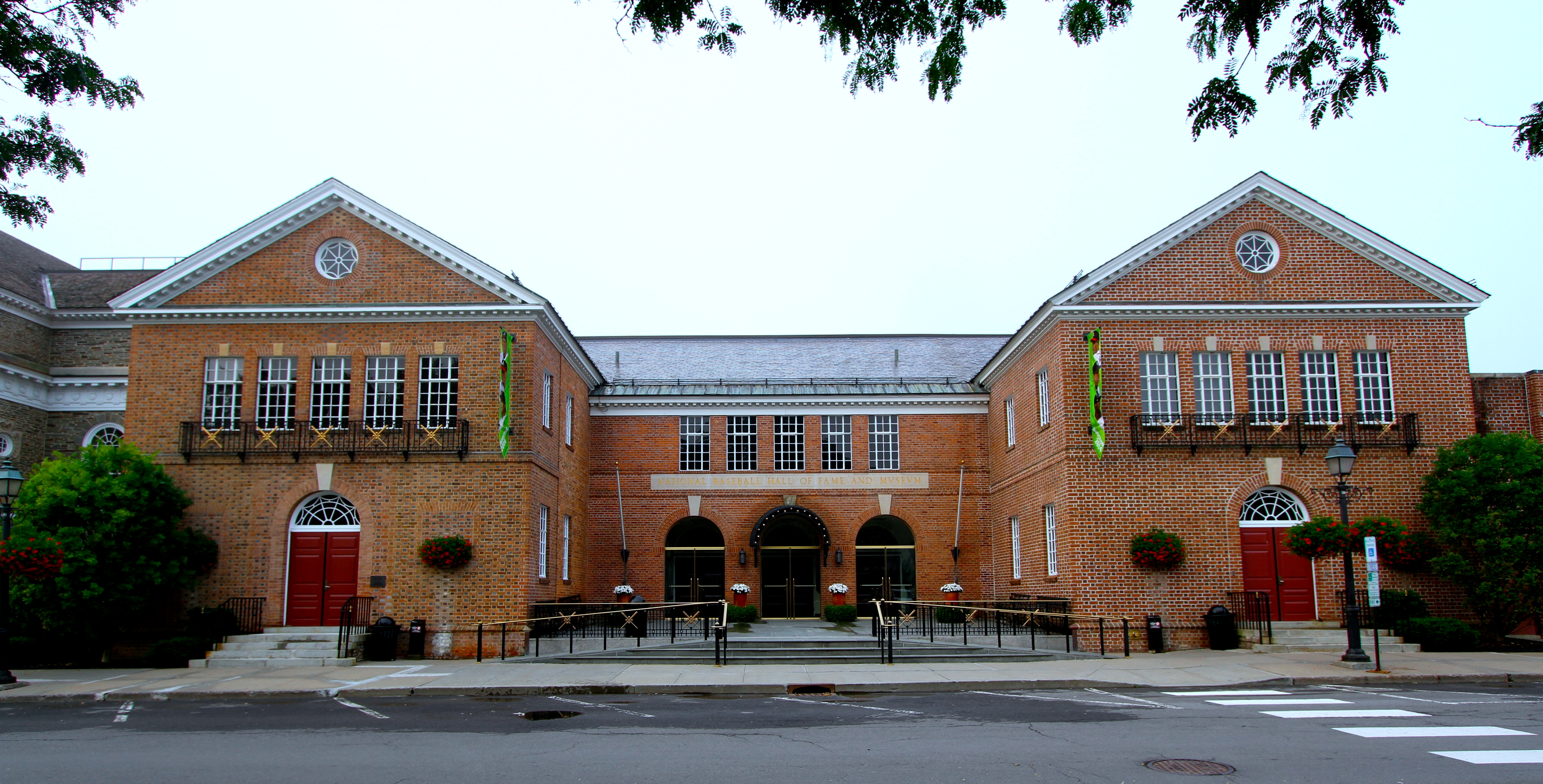
National Baseball Hall of Fame and Museum, 2014

The Honor Rolls of Baseball were established in 1946 by the National Baseball Hall of Fame and Museum's Permanent Committee to establish as a second level of induction designed to recognize non-playing contributors. The committee designed the Honor Rolls to commemorate managers, executives, umpires and sportswriters, as an addition to their regular vote of old-time players. Though sportswriter Henry Chadwick was elected in 1938, the Hall had not devised a plan to extend recognition to these contributors, and this was the first attempt.

On April 23, 1946, the Permanent Committee voted to induct 11 players into the Baseball Hall of Fame, along with 39 non-players into the Honor Rolls, separated into their respective category. This second-tier list consisted of five managers, 11 umpires, 11 executives and 12 sportswriters. No person has been inducted since, although nine people from the Honor Rolls have since been inducted into the Baseball Hall of Fame.

== Key ==
Those named to the Honor Rolls of Baseball may still be inducted to the Hall of Fame through selection by the Veterans Committee, or (in the case of sportswriters) may receive the BBWAA Career Excellence Award. Such additional recognitions are denoted in the below table.

Name	Name of the person by official records
†	Elected to the Baseball Hall of Fame
‡	Recipient of the BBWAA Career Excellence Award (sportswriters)
Year inducted	Year inducted into the Baseball Hall of Fame (or received the BBWAA Career Excellence Award)
§	Indicates the person was also a player

== Honor Rolls of Baseball recipients ==
=== Executives ===
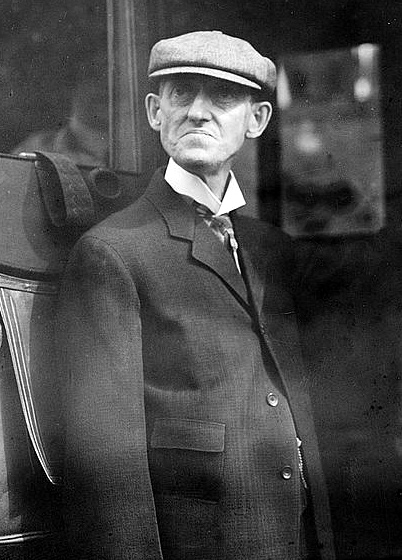
New York Giants Owner John T. Brush

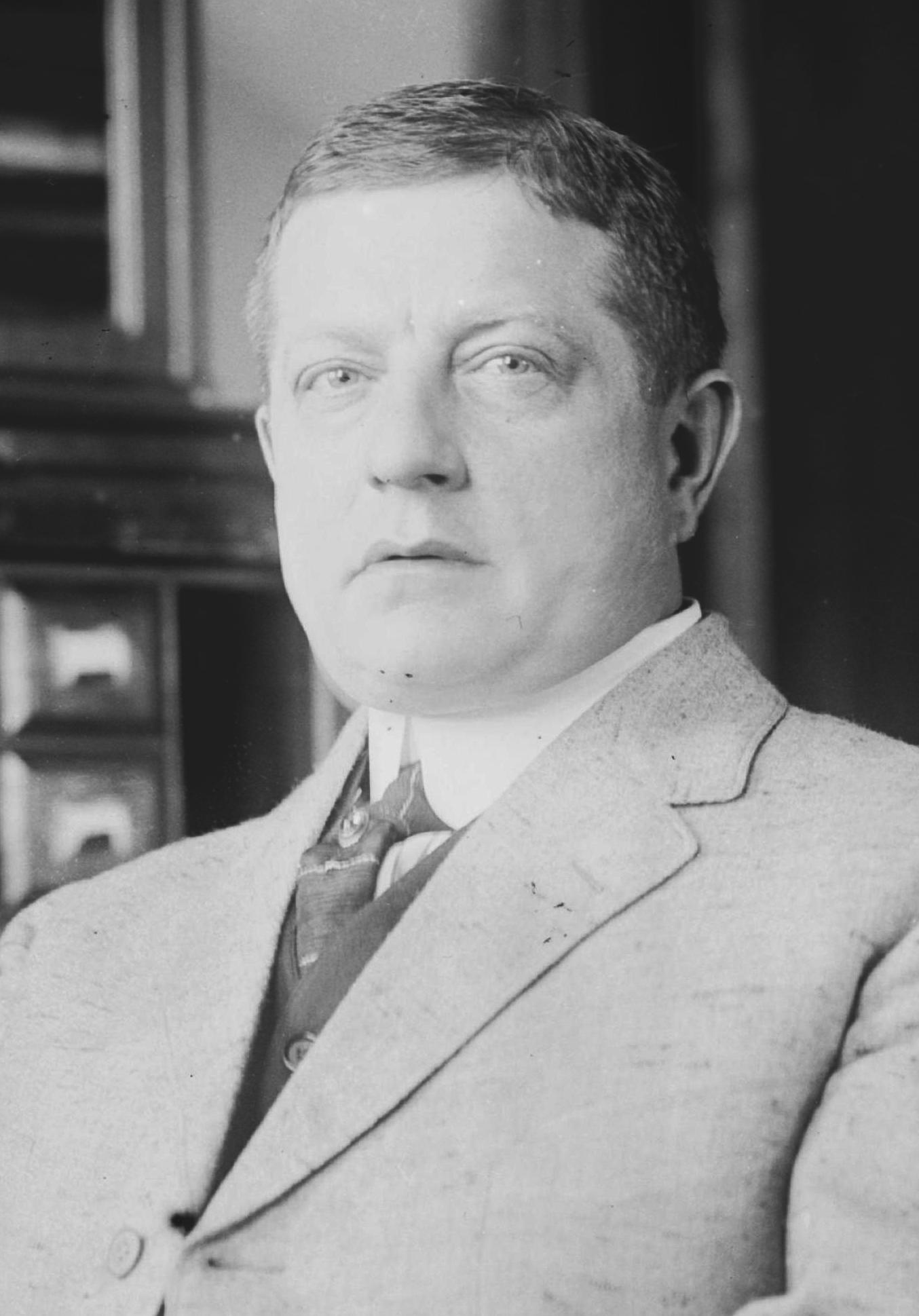
National League President John Heydler

Name	Year inducted	Notes	Ref
Ernest Barnard	—	Barnard was president of the Cleveland Indians from 1922 to 1927 and the second president of the American League from 1927 to 1931.	
Ed Barrow^{†}	1953	Barrow was the New York Yankees' president and general manager from 1920 to 1945. He was also the on-field manager for the Detroit Tigers from 1903 to 1904, and the Boston Red Sox from 1918 to 1920, which included their World Series victory in 1918.	
John E. Bruce	—	Bruce was secretary of the National Commission, the forerunner of Baseball's Commissioner's Office, from 1903 to 1920. He was previously a legal counsel to the American League president, and was a part owner of St. Louis Browns from 1902 to 1916.	
John T. Brush	—	Brush was the principal owner of the Indianapolis Hoosiers, Cincinnati Reds, and the New York Giants.	
Barney Dreyfuss^{†}	2008	Dreyfuss owned the Louisville Colonels and Pittsburgh Pirates franchises from 1890 to 1932.	
Charles Ebbets	—	Ebbets was an owner of the Brooklyn Dodgers franchise, also serving as president and, for one season, the on-field manager.	
August Herrmann	—	Herrmann was an owner of the Cincinnati Reds franchise from 1902 to 1927.	
John Heydler	—	Heydler started in Major League Baseball as an umpire, and later became the National League president in 1909, and then again from 1918 to 1934.	
Bob Quinn	—	Quinn was the principal owner of the Boston Red Sox from 1923 to 1933.	
Arthur Soden	—	Soden was the National League president in 1882 and president/owner of the Boston Beaneaters from 1877 to 1907.	
Nicholas Young	—	Young was a manager and umpire in the National Association before he became the National League president in 1885, an office he held until 1902.	

=== Managers ===
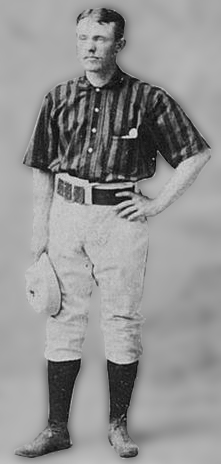
Baseball Hall of Famer John Montgomery Ward

Name	Year Inducted	Notes	Ref
Bill Carrigan §	—	Carrigan played 10 seasons with the Boston Red Sox from 1906 to 1916, and was also their manager from 1913 to 1916. He was a part of three World Series championship teams with Boston, two as their player-manager. He later returned as Boston's manager in 1927 and stayed until 1929.	
Ned Hanlon^{†} §	1996	Hanlon had a playing career that lasted from 1880 to 1892, and a managerial career that lasted from 1889 to 1907. As manager, he led his teams to five National League titles, three with the Baltimore Orioles and two with the Brooklyn Superbas. He later became part owner of the Brooklyn franchise.	
Miller Huggins^{†} §	1964	Huggins had a 13-year playing career that included time with the Cincinnati Reds and St. Louis Cardinals. He began his managerial with the Cardinals, and later managed the New York Yankees from 1918 to 1929. As their manager, the Yankees made six appearances in the World Series, including four championships.	
Frank Selee^{†}	1999	Selee managed the Boston Beaneaters from 1890 to 1901, and claimed five National League championships. Later he managed the Chicago Cubs from 1902 to 1905.	
John Montgomery Ward^{†} §	1964	Ward had a 16-year playing career that lasted from 1878 to 1894, and was a manager for seven of those seasons. Was a part of three National League championship teams. He pitched the second perfect game in Major League Baseball history on June 17, 1880.	

=== Umpires ===
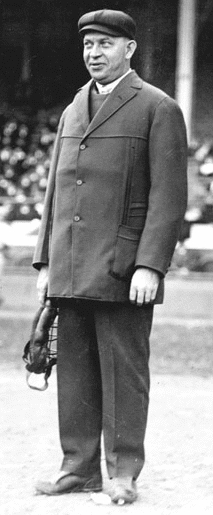
Baseball Hall of Famer Bill Klem

Name	Year Inducted	Notes	Ref
Tom Connolly^{†}	1953	Connolly spent 32 of his 35-year career in the American League career. He also worked in eight World Series.	
Bill Dinneen §	—	Dinneen had a 12-year pitching career, then umpired in the American League for 30 years. In addition to his one World Series appearance as a player, he also umpired in eight.	
Bob Emslie §	—	Emslie was a pitcher for three seasons before starting his umpiring career. His career lasted 35 seasons, 34 of which were with the National League, from 1890 to 1924.	
Billy Evans^{†}	1973	Evans become the youngest umpire in history when he began his 22-year career at the age of 22 in the American League. He umpired in six World Series, and later became general manager of the Cleveland Indians and Detroit Tigers.	
John Gaffney	—	Gaffney's 14-year career as an umpire was interrupted for parts of two seasons when he managed the Washington Nationals in 1886 and 1887.	
Tim Hurst	—	Hurst had an umpiring career that lasted 16 seasons from 1891 to 1909, during which he managed the St. Louis Browns for the 1898 season.	
Kick Kelly	—	Kelly umpired eight seasons from 1882 to 1897. He managed the Louisville Colonels for the 1887 and 1888 seasons.	
Bill Klem^{†}	1953	In Klem's 37-year National League career, he umpired 18 World Series and two all-star games.	
Thomas Lynch	—	Lynch had an umpiring career that lasted 13 seasons from 1888 to 1902. Later, he became the National League president from 1910 to 1913.	
Silk O'Loughlin	—	O'Loughlin had an umpiring career that lasted 17 seasons in the American League from 1902 until his death in 1918.	
Jack Sheridan	—	Sheridan began his umpiring career with the Players' League in 1890, then in the National League sporadically until 1901 when he joined the American League and lasted until his death in 1914.	

=== Writers ===
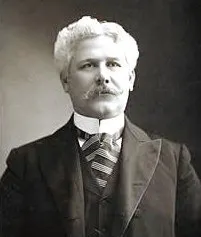
Tim Murnane

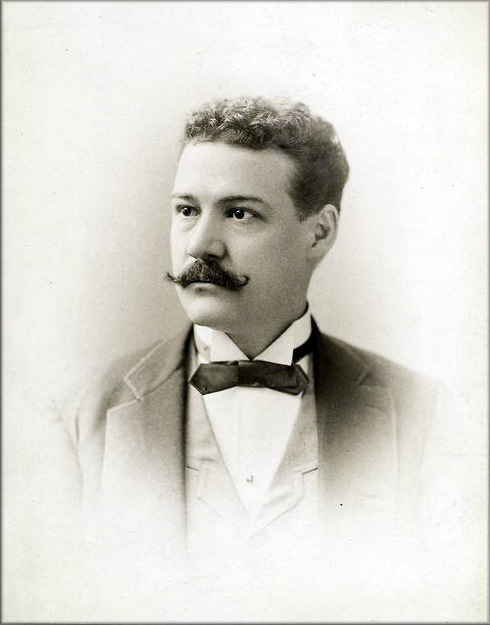
Francis Richter

Name	Year awarded	Notes	Ref
Walter Barnes	—	After graduating from Harvard, Barnes joined the staff of The Boston Post in 1880. He was also a sports editor of The Boston Journal, the Boston Herald and The Boston Globe. When he retired in 1939, he was the oldest member of the BBWAA, holding card #1.	
Harry Cross	—	After attending Harvard College in 1905, Cross worked for various New York City newspapers covering sports. He joined The New York Times from 1909 to 1920, and again from 1924 to 1925, then was the sports editor for the New York Evening post from 1920 to 1924, and the New York Herald Tribune from 1926 to 1941. He also worked for the New York Giants, and was a member of the Baseball Hall of Fame committee from June 1945 until his death in 1946.	
William B. Hanna	—	After attending Lafayette College, Hanna worked for various New York City newspapers covering sports. He first worked for The Kansas City Star before moving to New York City. He was writer for the New York Herald in 1892 and the New York Press in 1893. He also wrote for The Sun for 16 years before he returned to the Herald. After 8 years, he moved over to the New York Herald Tribune and worked there until his death in May 1930.	
Frank Hough	—	Hough was a baseball writer for The Philadelphia Inquirer and was given part ownership of the Philadelphia Athletics when he lent money to Connie Mack so he could launch the team in 1901. He later sold his interest in the club to Mack and became sports editor of the Inquirer.	
Sid Mercer^{‡}	1969	Mercer worked for the St. Louis Post-Dispatch before moving to New York City and writing for The New York Evening Globe. He later became president of the BBWAA, and wrote for the New York Journal American until his death in 1945. The Sid Mercer-Dick Young Player of the Year Award, presented annually by the New York Chapter of the BBWAA, was named in his honor.	
Tim Murnane^{‡} §	1978	Murnane was one of the first baseball writers for The Boston Globe, a role he held from 1887 until his death in 1917. An early supporter of the first players' union and the short-lived Players' League, he also served as president of the New England League, a midlevel minor-league, from 1892 to 1916. In his earlier years, Murnane played professionally, spending four seasons in the National Association, three seasons in the National League, and one season in the Union Association as a player-manager.	
Francis Richter	—	Richter's career as a baseball writer lasted from 1870 until his death in 1926. Influential in the development of sports journalism, he began writing for the Philadelphia Day, and the Sunday World. He later developed the first newspaper sports department at the Public Ledger. He founded the Sporting Life, an all-sports journal.	
Irving Sanborn	—	Sanborn, a graduate of Dartmouth College, wrote for the Chicago Tribune for 40 years, retiring in 1930. He was one of the founding members of the BBWAA.	
John B. Sheridan	—	Sheridan, St. Louis sports writer, wrote for the Sporting News.	
Bill Slocum	—	Slocum wrote for the New York Journal American, and was a ghostwriter for Babe Ruth. The William J. Slocum-Jack Lang Award, presented annually by the New York Baseball Writers Association to a person judged to have a long and meritorious service to baseball, was named in his honor.	
George Tidden	—	Tidden was a writer for the New York Journal American.	
Joe Vila	—	Vila was a writer for the New York Morning Sun, and later became the sports editor and columnist for the New York Evening Sun.	

== See also ==
- List of members of the Baseball Hall of Fame
