= Jack Sheridan (umpire) =

American baseball umpire (1862-1914)

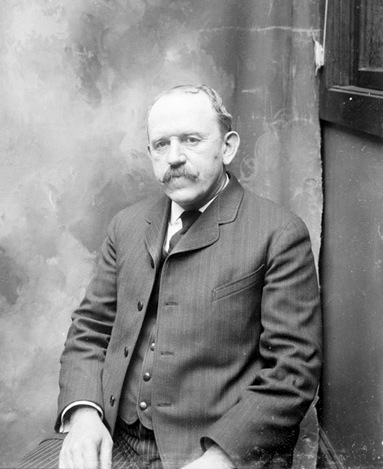
- Sheridan in 1901
- Born: April 30, 1862; Decatur, Illinois, U.S.
- Died: November 2, 1914 (aged 52); San Jose, California, U.S.
- Occupation: Umpire
- Years active: 1890, 1892, 1896–1914
- Employer(s): American League, Players' League, National League

John F. Sheridan (April 30, 1862 – November 2, 1914) was an American umpire in Major League Baseball. In his 30-year career as an official, he worked 19 seasons between 1890 and 1914 in three major leagues. Several of Sheridan's contemporaries considered him to be the best major league umpire. He pioneered the crouching stance used by modern umpires at home plate. In 1946 Sheridan was named to the Honor Rolls of Baseball of the Baseball Hall of Fame.

== Early life ==
Sheridan was born in Decatur, Illinois. His mother Bridget was born in Ireland. During his childhood, Jack's family moved to San Jose, California, where he made his home thereafter. He enjoyed a brief career in the minor leagues as a second baseman. In 1883, Sheridan secured an advance of funds by convincing the manager of a Chattanooga minor league team that he would be an asset to the team. The manager was so disappointed in Sheridan's abilities that he took out an arrest warrant on the player. Sheridan was forced to repay the money he earned by working at a cigarette factory. He turned to umpiring soon after traveling with a team of California players for an eastern tour.

== Career ==
He began his career by umpiring in the Southern League in 1885, then officiated in the California League from 1886 to 1889, after which he gained his first major league experience in the sole season of the Players' League in 1890. Nearly all games in that era used a single umpire, and the most outstanding officials generally moved from league to league, going wherever the league presidents were perceived as being most supportive, both in salary and in affirming the umpires' field authority. After returning to the California League for the 1891 season, Sheridan umpired in the National League in 1892, then again in the Southern League in 1893.

In 1894–95, he umpired in the Western League, where he first became associated with that league's president, Ban Johnson. Johnson was fiercely supportive of his umpiring staff, and apart from a brief return to the NL in 1896–97, including the 1896 Temple Cup, Sheridan would remain an umpire in Johnson's league for the remainder of his career. In 1900, the Western League renamed itself the American League, and through a series of signings of NL players, the following year successfully established itself as a rival major league. In contrast to the rowdier NL, where umpires were routinely subjected to great abuse with little backing from the league office, Johnson staunchly defended his field officials and insisted that players and local authorities maintain respect for them.

When he was not umpiring, Sheridan worked as an undertaker. A 1905 newspaper article even described Sheridan as having announced his retirement to pursue undertaking in 1905. Before the 1906 season, Sheridan renewed his contract with the American League. In 1906, Sheridan ejected outfielder Tip O'Neill after an argument and may have been indirectly responsible for the end of O'Neill's career. The outfielder was replaced by Pat Dougherty, who won the position for the season. O'Neill did not play in the major leagues after that year.

He became the standard after which other umpires patterned themselves; after arriving in the AL at age 22 in 1906, Billy Evans regularly worked in a team with Sheridan for several years in order to study under the senior umpire, with Sheridan usually working behind the plate and Evans on the bases. Both Evans and fellow Hall of Famer Bill Klem regarded Sheridan as the game's greatest umpire. Many years later, Evans said, "Each day while working the bases I would follow every move of Sheridan, as he shifted his body and stance back of the plate to follow the flight of the ball."

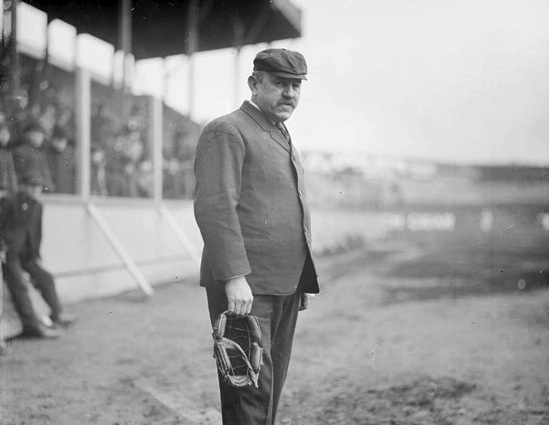
Sheridan at South Side Park, 1905.

Sheridan umpired in four of the first seven World Series: 1905, 1907, 1908 and 1910; he also umpired in the earlier Temple Cup NL championship series in 1896. In the winter of 1913–1914, he and Klem were the two umpires accompanying the Chicago White Sox and New York Giants on their world tour. Along with Bob Emslie and Tim Hurst, he is one of only three umpires who umpired both before 1893, when the pitching distance was only 50 feet, and also after the NL and AL formally recognized one another as major leagues in 1903. He is the only umpire active prior to 1893 who went on to officiate in a World Series.

In September 1911, Sheridan asked Johnson for permission to permanently retire from umpiring. Johnson presented Sheridan with a medal of appreciation and said that while Sheridan would retire from the field, he expected the umpire to return to the league in an off-the-field capacity the next season. In March 1912, Sheridan said, "But I guess when the bell rings I'll be back in harness. Ban Johnson will need me when the fight grows hot." He umpired between June and August of that season. The Pittsburgh Press announced that Sheridan would retire before the 1913 season. He joined the umpiring staff in late June that year.

He suffered sunstroke while umpiring a game at Chicago in August 1914, and never fully recovered from the affliction. He called his last game on September 24 at Chicago, and despite the pleas of fellow officials insisted on remaining in the city for the crosstown series between the White Sox and Cubs before traveling to his home in California. Once there, his condition continued to deteriorate until he died three weeks later of a heart attack at age 52, at the San Jose home of his sister.

== Legacy ==
The day after Sheridan died, the San Francisco Chronicle wrote that he was "the most famous and oldest diamond official before the public and was popular because of his well-known honesty and ability."

Over his 14 seasons as the dean of AL umpires, Sheridan became the prototype of the 20th century umpire. Whereas umpires in the 19th century had worked behind the plate in a standing position, believing that it helped them to better observe the flight of the ball, Sheridan established the practice of crouching while calling balls and strikes, a move which was quickly adopted universally due to its effectiveness. He was also remarkable in that he refused to use any sort of protection other than a mask. He was agile enough to reportedly never be hit by a foul ball.

Sheridan was among the several umpires who were named to the Honor Rolls of Baseball by the Baseball Hall of Fame in 1946, at a time when no umpires had yet received full membership in the Hall. In the initial voting for induction of umpires in 1953, he finished third in the voting behind inductees Bill Klem and Tommy Connolly, and was the only other candidate to receive a first-place vote.
