= Harry Cross (sportswriter) =

American sportswriter and editor (1881–1946)

- Born: Harry Edward Cross; September 9, 1881; New Britain, Connecticut
- Died: April 3, 1946 (aged 64); New York City
- Occupation: Sports journalist
- Years active: 1905–1946
- Organization(s): Waterbury American (1905–1909); The New York Times (1909–1920; 1924–1925); Evening Post (1920–1924); New York Herald Tribune Sunday Magazine (1942–1945)
- Awards: Honor Rolls of Baseball (1946)

Harry Edward Cross (September 9, 1881 – April 3, 1946) was an American sports writer and editor.

Cross was regarded as one of the most accomplished sports journalist in New York City for more than three decades. He was a specialized expert in writing about baseball, boxing and football, and was also an authority in lesser known sports as curling, figure skating, polo and rowing. Excepting golf and tennis, he was assigned to cover almost every major event, becoming a familiar figure at the Polo Grounds, Yankee Stadium and Madison Square Garden, as well as at other sports venues.

Born in New Britain, Connecticut, Cross grew up in nearby Naugatuck. A distinguished alumnus of Naugatuck High School, he then graduated from Harvard College in 1905. He started his sports writing career with the Waterbury American that autumn and for the next four years.

Cross joined the sports department of The New York Times in 1909, where he remained through 1920. Soon after his arriving in New York, he covered primarily the New York Giants Major League Baseball club, to become one of the first Times writers to regularly attend spring training camp, while handling such major assignments as the historic and controversial Jack Dempsey–Jess Willard Fight of 1919.

Cross became sports editor of the Evening Post in 1920, but returned to the Times from 1924 through 1926. He then joined the sports staff of the New York Herald Tribune Sunday Magazine in 1926, where he remained until 1945. He was briefly the sports editor at the Tribune in 1927, and exclusively covered baseball from 1942 to 1945.

In between, Cross was president of the New York Chapter of the Baseball Writers' Association of America, being a member of the Baseball Hall of Fame committee from June 1945 until his death in 1946. In addition, he was a long-time member of the Football Writers Association, serving also as its treasurer.

A few months after his death, Harry Cross was one of 12 writers who were honored by the Baseball Hall of Fame on a Roll of Honor in its Class of 1946.
