= 1953 Baseball Hall of Fame balloting =

Elections to the Baseball Hall of Fame

National Baseball

Hall of Fame and Museum
- New inductees: 8
- via BBWAA: 2
- via Veterans Committee: 6
- Total inductees: 70
- Induction date: July 27, 1953

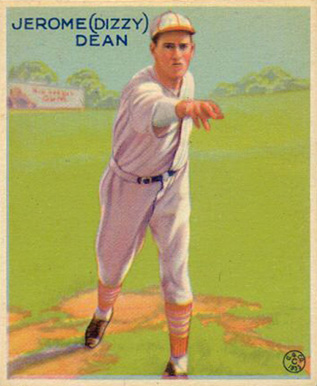
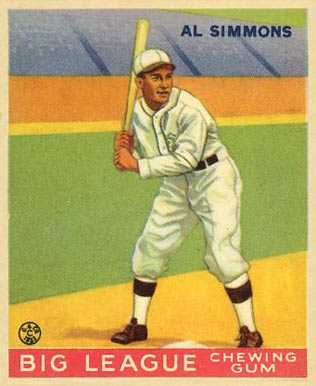
1953 BBWAA inductees Dizzy Dean (left) and Al Simmons

Elections to the Baseball Hall of Fame for 1953 followed a radically new procedure. The institution appointed its Committee on Baseball Veterans, the famous "Veterans Committee", to meet in person and consider pioneers and executives, managers, umpires, and earlier major league players. Committees in the 1930s and 1940s had chosen several pioneers and executives, but this was the first direction of anyone's attention to field personnel other than players, the managers and umpires.

The first Veterans Committee met in closed sessions and elected six people: Ed Barrow, Chief Bender, Tommy Connolly, Bill Klem, Bobby Wallace, and Harry Wright. The Baseball Writers' Association of America (BBWAA) voted by mail, per usual, to select from recent players and elected two, Dizzy Dean and Al Simmons. A formal induction ceremony was held in Cooperstown, New York, on July 27, 1953, with Commissioner of Baseball Ford Frick in attendance.

== BBWAA election ==
The 10-year members of the BBWAA had the authority to select any players active in 1928 or later, provided they had not been active in 1952. Voters were instructed to cast votes for 10 candidates; any candidate receiving votes on at least 75% of the ballots would be honored with induction to the Hall.

A total of 264 ballots were cast in the Baseball Writers Election, with 2,525 individual votes for 83 specific candidates, an average of 9.56 per ballot; 198 votes were required for election. The two candidates who received at least 75% of the vote and were elected are indicated in bold italics; those candidates who were selected in subsequent elections are indicated in italics.

The rules at the time indicated that players were eligible if they had been out of baseball for at least one season, so this was Joe DiMaggio's first season of eligibility, as he had retired after the 1951 season.

Player	Votes	Percent	Change
**Dizzy Dean**	209	79.2	▲14.2%
**Al Simmons**	199	75.4	▲15.1%
Bill Terry	191	72.3	▲6.1%
Bill Dickey	179	67.8	▲8.4%
Rabbit Maranville	164	62.1	▲5.3%
Dazzy Vance	150	56.8	▲11.9%
Ted Lyons	139	52.7	▲9.5%
Joe DiMaggio	117	44.3	-
Chief Bender	104	34.9	▲5.0%
Gabby Hartnett	104	34.9	▲2.0%
Hank Greenberg	80	30.3	▼1.8%
Joe Cronin	69	26.1	▲5.6%
Casey Stengel	61	23.1	▲11.6%
Hank Gowdy	58	22.0	▲7.5%
Max Carey	55	20.8	▲5.4%
Ray Schalk	52	19.7	▲0.9%
Pepper Martin	43	16.3	▲3.1%
Hack Wilson	43	16.3	▲7.3%
Lefty Gomez	35	13.3	▲0.9%
Edd Roush	32	12.1	▲1.8%
Zack Wheat	32	12.1	▼0.7%
Ross Youngs	31	11.7	▼2.8%
Tony Lazzeri	28	10.6	▼1.8%
Red Ruffing	24	9.1	▲4.8%
Bucky Harris	21	8.0	▲2.9%
Duffy Lewis	20	7.6	▲2.9%
Rube Marquard	19	7.2	▲3.4%
Kiki Cuyler	18	6.8	▲2.5%
Babe Adams	17	6.4	▲2.6%
Waite Hoyt	14	5.3	▲0.2%
Dickey Kerr	13	4.9	▲1.1%
Steve O'Neill	13	4.9	▲0.6%
Lefty O'Doul	11	4.2	▼3.9%
Dave Bancroft	10	3.8	▼0.9%
Jim Bottomley	10	3.8	▲0.8%
Tommy Henrich	10	3.8	▲2.1%
Bucky Walters	10	3.8	▲2.5%
Jimmie Wilson	10	3.8	▲0.8%
Wilbur Cooper	9	3.4	▲2.5%
Red Faber	9	3.4	▼0.4%
Burleigh Grimes	9	3.4	▼0.4%
Charlie Grimm	9	3.4	▲0.8%
Mel Harder	8	3.0	▼1.3%
Muddy Ruel	8	3.0	▲2.6%
Jimmy Dykes	5	1.9	▼0.2%
Red Rolfe	5	1.9	▲0.2%
Everett Scott	5	1.9	▲0.2%
Jesse Haines	4	1.5	-
Art Nehf	4	1.5	▲0.2%
Cy Williams	4	1.5	▼0.2%
Earle Combs	3	1.1	▲0.7%
Howard Ehmke	3	1.1	▲0.7%
Sam Rice	3	1.1	▲0.7%
Eppa Rixey	3	1.1	▼0.2%
Glenn Wright	3	1.1	▲0.7%
Luke Appling	2	0.8	-
Bobby Doerr	2	0.8	-
Chick Hafey	2	0.8	▲0.4%
Babe Herman	2	0.8	▼0.5%
Travis Jackson	2	0.8	▲0.4%
Al López	2	0.8	▼0.1%
Roger Peckinpaugh	2	0.8	▼0.1%
Billy Southworth	2	0.8	▲0.4%
Nick Altrock	1	0.4	-
Donie Bush	1	0.4	-
Mike González	1	0.4	Steady
Charlie Keller	1	0.4	-
Johnny Kling	1	0.4	-
Bill Lange	1	0.4	-
Dolf Luque	1	0.4	Steady
Joe McCarthy	1	0.4	-
Clyde Milan	1	0.4	Steady
Terry Moore	1	0.4	-
Charley O'Leary	1	0.4	-
Hub Pruett	1	0.4	Steady
Dave Robertson	1	0.4	-
Eddie Rommel	1	0.4	▼0.5%
Germany Schaefer	1	0.4	-
George Selkirk	1	0.4	Steady
Bill Sherdel	1	0.4	-
Gabby Street	1	0.4	-
Arky Vaughan	1	0.4	-
Bill Wambsganss	1	0.4	-

Key to colors
Elected to the Hall. These individuals are also indicated in **bold italics**.
Players who were elected in future elections. These individuals are also indicated in plain italics.

== Veterans Committee ==
By 1953, the Old-Timers Committee had not met for seven years (1946), and had only elected two players by mail, Mordecai Brown and Kid Nichols. They had not elected any non-players since the mass induction of 1945, and no players whose careers had begun before 1890 since the election of 1946.

In response to this and the Old-Timers Committee members' increasing ages, a new "Committee on Baseball Veterans" (commonly known as the Veterans Committee) was created, consisting of:

- J. G. Taylor Spink, publisher of The Sporting News from 1914 to 1962, Chairman of the Committee
- Paul Kerr, director of the Clark Foundation which funded the Hall, and future President of the Baseball Hall of Fame
- American League President Will Harridge
- National League President and former General Manager of the Cincinnati Reds Warren Giles
- Branch Rickey, who helped pioneer the farm system as General Manager of the St. Louis Cardinals, signed Jackie Robinson who broke the color barrier as General Manager of the Brooklyn Dodgers, and was at this time active General Manager of the Pittsburgh Pirates
- President of the International League Frank Shaughnessy
- Hall of Fame second baseman Charlie Gehringer
- sportswriter Warren Brown, who, among other things, is credited with giving Babe Ruth the nickname "The Sultan of Swat"
- sportswriter Frank Graham of the New York Journal-American
- sportswriter and former BBWAA President John Malaney of The Boston Post
- former sportswriter and then secretary-treasurer of the National League Charlie Segar

The first Veterans Committee met in closed sessions and elected six people: Ed Barrow, Chief Bender, Tommy Connolly, Bill Klem, Bobby Wallace, and Harry Wright. Afterwards, the Veterans Committee was limited to two selections per meeting. It was also decided in 1953 that the new Veterans Committee would meet only in odd-numbered years. On July 22, 1956, it was decided that the BBWAA would vote only in even-numbered years.

Of the 11 members of the Veterans Committee, Charlie Gehringer had already been inducted in the Hall as a player in 1949; Branch Rickey would be inducted as an executive/pioneer in 1967, Will Harridge would be inducted as an executive in 1972, and Warren Giles would be inducted as an executive in 1979. Additionally, J. G. Taylor Spink (1962), Frank Graham (1971) and Warren Brown (1973) would be honored with the J. G. Taylor Spink Award.
