= Walter Barnes (sportswriter) =

American sportswriter and sports editor (1860–1940)

- Born: Walter Saunders Barnes Jr. November 26, 1860; Boston, Massachusetts, U.S.
- Died: February 13, 1940 (aged 79); Brookline, Massachusetts, U.S.
- Resting place: Woodlawn Cemetery, Wellesley, Massachusetts
- Education: Harvard College
- Occupations: Sportswriter, editor
- Years active: 1889–1933
- Known for: Boston baseball coverage
- Spouse: Hulda Oliver (m. 1905; died 1935)
- Awards: Honor Rolls of Baseball (1946)

Walter Saunders Barnes Jr. (November 26, 1860 – February 13, 1940) was an American sportswriter and sports editor who covered professional baseball in Boston. After working at three Boston newspapers—The Boston Post, The Boston Journal, and Boston Herald—he served as sports editor at The Boston Globe from 1910 to 1933. A charter member of the Baseball Writers' Association of America (BBWAA), he held membership card No. 1 from that organization. A graduate of Somerville High School and Harvard College (class of 1884), he was selected to the Honor Rolls of Baseball in 1946.

== See also ==
- Walter S. and Melissa E. Barnes House, in Somerville, Massachusetts, which is named for his parents
