= Joe Vila =

American sportswriter and editor (1866–1934)

- Born: Joseph Spencer Vila; September 16, 1866; Boston, Massachusetts, US
- Died: April 27, 1934 (aged 67); Brooklyn, New York, US
- Occupation: Sports journalist
- Years active: 1888–1934
- Organization(s): Boston Herald; New York Evening Sun; New York Morning Sun
- Awards: Honor Rolls of Baseball (1946)

Joseph Spencer Vila (September 16, 1866 – April 27, 1934) was an American sportswriter and editor. He has been regarded as one of the most influential sportswriters during the first third of the 20th century, while setting fundamental changes in sports coverage during the decades to come.

== Biography ==
Vila attended Boston Latin School, where he learned to play baseball and football, and entered Harvard College from 1886 to 1887 and the Harvard Law School for a brief time. During his stay at Harvard, he instantly became a member of the football team, and in the following spring joined the baseball team. His individual statistics in both sports assured him a regular position on the varsity teams the following year, but he left college to go into business.

After leaving Harvard, Vila went to work on the Baltimore and Ohio Railroad as a brakeman and baggage smasher. He started his journalism career in his native Boston through a series of newspapers before joining the most sports-oriented daily paper in town, the Boston Herald.

In 1889, Vila moved to New York City, where he collaborated for the New York Morning Sun. With writing, in its early years, he introduced a more contemporary play-by-play review for the 1889 Harvard-Princeton match.

Four years later, Vila was hired by the New York Evening Sun, one of the city’s most prestigious daily newspapers. In addition, he began to covering boxing in 1898. That allowed him to become the first sportswriter to use a typewriter at ringside, while dictating to a typist round by round the fight between James J. Corbett and Tom Sharkey and sending the resulting copy to a Western Union operator. As a result, other reporters who customarily wrote in longhand rapidly began to switch to typewriters.

From 1900 through 1910, Vila covered mostly horse racing and baseball, but later devoted strictly to baseball. By then he was considered a powerful influence behind the scenes in professional sports.

In 1902, Vila was instrumental in the Andrew Freedman's decision to sell the New York Giants National League club to John T. Brush. Besides this, he helped to establish a New York baseball team in the newborn American League, when he introduced Jacob Ruppert, by then owner of the New York Yankees, to Joe McCarthy, who would become the Yankees all-time leader managerial wins with 1,460 from 1931 to 1946, including seven World Series titles spanning 1932–1943.

Vila became sports editor of The Sun in 1914. In addition to baseball, boxing, football and horse racing, he also covered yachting and rowing. Being sports editor also made him a columnist, while his daily column, entitled Setting the Pace, was to appear six days a week for over 20 years. His column was, unlike those of many of his contemporaries, very factual and straightforward, being often historic and less opinionated.

Vila collapsed at his desk in 1934, while covering the opening of the horse race spring meeting at Jamaica Race Course. He was taken to a hospital and then to his home in Brooklyn, where he died later of a heart failure at the age of 67.

Following his death, his legacy most definitely continued, inspiring both those already well integrated in The Sun and those young journalists seriously interested in covering the sport on a regular basis.

Vila was one of 12 writers who were named to the Honor Rolls of Baseball as selected by the Baseball Hall of Fame in 1946.
