= John B. Sheridan =

- Born: John Brinsley Sheridan; January 22, 1870; County Meath, Ireland
- Died: April 14, 1930 (aged 60); St. Louis, Missouri, U.S.
- Citizenship: American
- Occupation: Sportswriter
- Years active: 1888–1929
- Known for: Column "Back of Home Plate" in Sporting News
- Awards: Honor Rolls of Baseball (1946)

John Brinsley Sheridan (January 22, 1870 – April 14, 1930) was an Irish-born American sportswriter. He was a prominent sports journalist in St. Louis for over four decades and gained national recognition for his baseball writing in the Sporting News. He was posthumously named to the Baseball Hall of Fame's Honor Rolls of Baseball in 1946.

== Early life and emigration ==
John Brinsley Sheridan was born in County Meath, Ireland, to Richard and Rosetta (née O'Reilly) Sheridan. He emigrated to the United States at the age of 18 in 1888.

== Career ==
Sheridan began his journalism career upon his arrival in St. Louis. From 1888 through 1929, he worked for various St. Louis newspapers, establishing himself as an authoritative voice on multiple sports, including baseball, American football, boxing, and golf.

He is best known for his nationally syndicated baseball column "Back of Home Plate", which ran in The Sporting News from 1917 until 1929. The column earned him widespread respect within the baseball community and among readers.

== Later life and whistleblower incident ==
In 1921, Sheridan was appointed chairman of the Missouri Committee on Public Utility Information. While serving in this capacity, he discovered and reported dishonest and illegal activities within the department, acting as a whistleblower. He submitted his resignation following the disclosure. The stress of the ordeal reportedly contributed to a severe nervous breakdown, for which he required extended medical care in a sanitarium. He never fully recovered his health.

== Death ==
On April 14, 1930, Sheridan died in St. Louis, Missouri, at the age of 59. He was found hanging in his room at Alexian Brothers Hospital by a bathrobe cord. His death was ruled a suicide.

== Legacy and honors ==
In 1946, sixteen years after his death, Sheridan was posthumously honored by the Baseball Hall of Fame. He was one of twelve writers inducted onto the Honor Rolls of Baseball (often called the "Roll of Honor") in the Hall's Class of 1946, recognizing his significant contributions to baseball journalism.
