= Harry Hempstead =

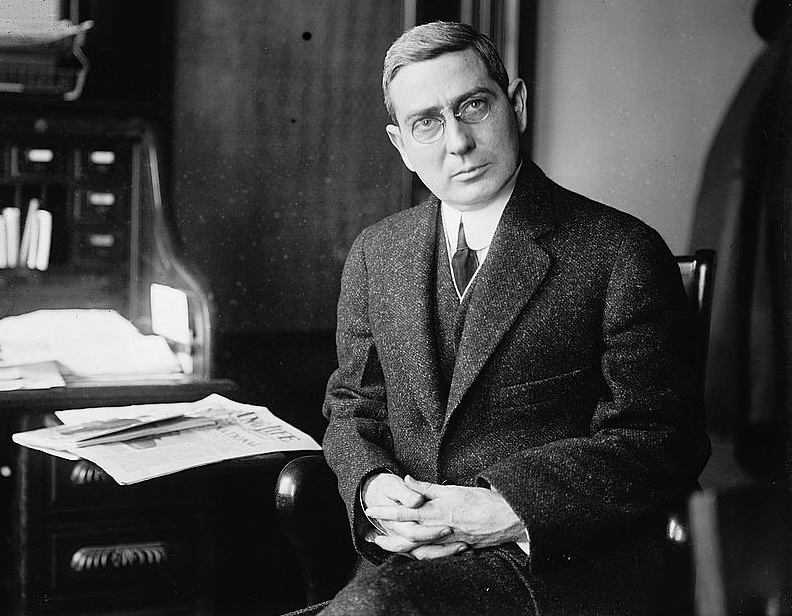
- Born: June 25, 1868; Philadelphia, Pennsylvania, U.S.
- Died: March 26, 1938 (aged 69); New York City, New York, U.S.
- Education: Lafayette College
- Known for: Owner of the New York Giants (MLB)
- Spouse: Eleanor Gordon Brush (m. 1894)
- Parents: Orlando Hempstead; Eliza Tyler Hempstead

Harry Newton Hempstead (June 25, 1868 – March 26, 1938) was the owner of the New York Giants of the National League from 1912 through 1919.

== Biography ==
He was born on June 25, 1868, in Philadelphia to Orlando Gordon Hempstead and Elizabeth Ophelia Tyler. He graduated from Lafayette College in 1891 and on October 10, 1894, he married Eleanor Gordon Brush. In 1912 he purchased the franchise from John T. Brush, his father-in-law. In 1919, he sold the franchise to Charles Stoneham. He died on March 26, 1938, at his home on Park Avenue in Manhattan.

From 1916 to 1924 he was a trustee of his alma mater, Lafayette College.
