= Sy Sanborn =

American journalist

- Born: Irving Ellis Sanborn; November 28, 1866; Albany, Vermont, US
- Died: July 18, 1934 (aged 67); Canandaigua, New York, US
- Occupation: Sports journalist
- Years active: 1889–1920
- Organization(s): The Springfield Union News (1889–1900); The Chicago Tribune (1900–1920)
- Awards: Honor Rolls of Baseball (1946)

Irving Ellis Sanborn (November 28, 1866 – July 18, 1934) was an American sports writer. He was familiarly known as Sy Sanborn.

Sanborn was one of the most renowned baseball journalists in the early days of the 20th century. He was featured writer at the Springfield Union News for twelve years, before joining the Chicago Tribune during more than two decades. In addition, Sanborn was one of the organizers of the Baseball Writers' Association of America, being one of the forty-three founding members of that organization established in 1908.

== Early life ==
Born in Albany, Vermont, Sanborn was the son of Albert J. Sanborn and Caroline C. Stockwell, being a descendant from a line of New England educators. After his father's death he pursued a career as a college professor, as he went through his preliminary schooling at St. Johnsbury and then attended Dartmouth College, where he graduated in 1889, earning a Bachelor of Arts degree and Phi Beta Kappa Society honors.

== Career ==
Immediately after his graduation from Dartmouth, Sanborn was assured of a teaching position at a school near Boston as soon as the fall term began. He then accepted a temporary job in the Springfield Union of Massachusetts, issuing baseball articles and serving as chief editor on all matters pertaining to sports in the newspaper. At this point, he enjoyed the work so well that he stayed with it and decided to specialize in sports journalism.

By then, Yale and Harvard universities had selected the city of Springfield as neutral ground for playing their baseball and football matches. Sanborn was assigned to cover these events. After that Springfield entered a baseball team into the original Eastern League, and Sanborn was given the job of reporting the games.

Sanborn remained with the Springfield Union for eleven years, in which he covered baseball during the summer and theatrical performances in the winter. During that time he became a close friend of Tom Burns, a versatile infielder and subsequently manager of the Chicago Cubs National League baseball club. Under the guidance of Burns, he turned into one of the brightest and best baseball writers in the business.

When the Chicago White Sox were incorporated to the American League in 1901, the Chicago Tribune required the services of another baseball reporter and gave the job to Sanborn. He stayed with the Tribune through 1920. During this stint he also worked on the foundation and development of the Baseball Writers' Association of America, becoming its president in 1919, while serving for several years on commission to select the Major League Baseball Most Valuable Player Award. Eventually, he was honored with the chairmanship of this commission.

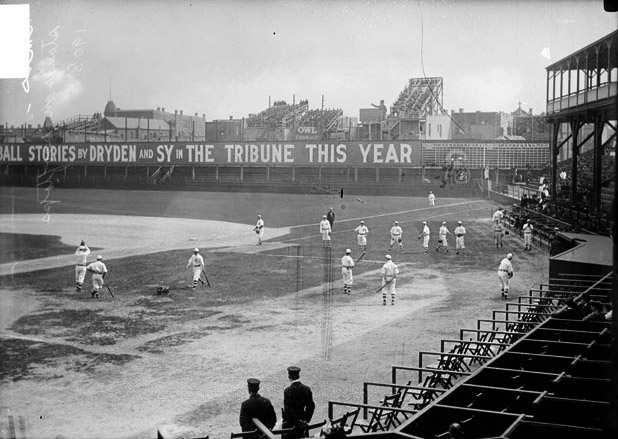
Billboard advertising Sanborn's column at Chicago's West Side Park

Besides his newspaper work, Sanborn served as a freelance writer for several magazines and also contributed as Chicago correspondent for The Sporting News. He moved to Canandaigua, New York after retiring from the Tribune.

In 1932, Sanborn spent nearly eleven months in a sanitarium following a long illness. He partly regained his health, though there was a gradual failing and was confined to his home most of the time. Two years later, he committed suicide by gunshot in the garden of his home. He was taken to the hospital in Canandaigua, where he died at the age of 67.

Twelve years after his death, Sy Sanborn was one of 12 writers who were honored by the Baseball Hall of Fame on a Roll of Honor in its Class of 1946.
