= 1964 Baseball Hall of Fame balloting =

Elections to the Baseball Hall of Fame

National Baseball

Hall of Fame and Museum
- New inductees: 7
- via BBWAA: 1
- via Veterans Committee: 6
- Total inductees: 101
- Induction date: July 27, 1964

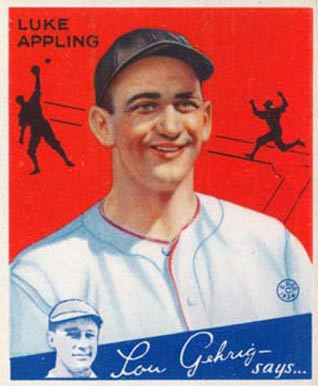
1964 BBWAA inductee Luke Appling

Elections to the Baseball Hall of Fame for 1964 followed the system introduced for even-number years in 1962. The Baseball Writers' Association of America (BBWAA) voted by mail to select from recent major league players with provision for a second, "runoff" election in the event of no player receiving enough votes for induction. The runoff was necessary this year, with Luke Appling the winner. Further, the eligibility of retired players was reduced from having retired 30 years prior to election to 20 years prior.

Meanwhile, the Veterans Committee was meeting annually to consider executives, managers, umpires, and earlier major league players. It selected six people: Red Faber, Burleigh Grimes, Miller Huggins, Tim Keefe, Heinie Manush, and John Montgomery Ward. A formal induction ceremony was held in Cooperstown, New York, on July 27, 1964, with Commissioner of Baseball Ford Frick presiding.

== BBWAA election ==
The BBWAA was authorized to elect players active in 1944 or later, but not after 1958. All 10-year members of the BBWAA were eligible to vote.

Voters were instructed to cast votes for up to 10 candidates; any candidate receiving votes on at least 75% of the ballots would be honored with induction to the Hall. A total of 58 players received votes; 201 ballots were cast, with 151 votes required for election. A total of 1,632 individual votes were cast, an average of 8.12 per ballot.

No one reached the threshold, so there was a runoff election featuring the 30 leading candidates. There would be one winner regardless of numerical support on the second ballot; in fact, winner Luke Appling tallied 189 of 201 votes or 94 percent. A total of 939 individual votes were cast in the runoff, an average of 4.67 per ballot.

Candidates who were eligible for the first time are indicated here with a dagger (†). Candidates who have since been elected in subsequent elections are indicated in italics. Al López was later elected as a manager.

Chuck Klein, Lloyd Waner, Pepper Martin, Leo Durocher, and Lon Warneke were on the ballot for the final time.

Player	Votes	Percent	Change	Runoff
**Luke Appling**	142	70.6	▲40.6%	189
Red Ruffing	141	70.1	▲25.1%	184
Roy Campanella†	115	57.2	-	138
Joe Medwick	108	53.7	▲32.5%	130
Pee Wee Reese†	73	36.3	-	47
Lou Boudreau	68	33.8	▲26.3%	43
Al López	57	28.4	▲21.5%	34
Chuck Klein	56	27.9	▲16.7%	18
Johnny Mize	54	26.9	▲18.1%	12
Mel Harder	51	25.4	▲21.0%	14
Johnny Vander Meer	51	25.4	▲22.3%	20
Marty Marion	50	24.9	▲14.9%	17
Lloyd Waner	47	23.4	▲20.3%	12
Phil Rizzuto	45	22.4	▼5.1%	11
Allie Reynolds	35	17.4	▲8.0%	6
Bucky Walters	35	17.4	▲14.3%	8
George Kell†	33	16.4	-	8
Ernie Lombardi	33	16.4	▲13.3%	9
Ralph Kiner	31	15.4	▲12.3%	3
Joe Gordon	30	14.9	▲12.4%	1
Billy Herman	26	12.9	▲10.4%	9
Hal Newhouser	26	12.9	▲10.4%	3
Bobby Doerr	24	11.9	▲5.7%	5
Bob Lemon†	24	11.9	-	3
Phil Cavarretta	22	10.9	▲9.7%	1
Pepper Martin	19	9.5	▲5.7%	5
Bobo Newsom	17	8.5	▲6.6%	1
Arky Vaughan	17	8.5	▲4.7%	6
Tommy Bridges	15	7.5	▲6.9%	1
Leo Durocher	15	7.5	▲6.9%	2
Terry Moore	14	7.0	▲6.4%	
Tommy Henrich	13	6.5	▲4.6%	
Sal Maglie†	13	6.5	-	
Lon Warneke	13	6.5	▲5.3%	
Doc Cramer	12	6.0	▲5.4%	
Dom DiMaggio	12	6.0	▲4.8%	
Charlie Keller	12	6.0	▲5.4%	
Fred Hutchinson	10	5.0	▲4.4%	
Hal Schumacher	10	5.0	▲4.4%	
Rudy York	10	5.0	▲4.4%	
Vic Raschi	8	4.0	▲3.4%	
Spud Chandler	6	3.0	▲1.8%	
Frank McCormick	6	3.0	▲2.4%	
Dixie Walker	6	3.0	▲2.4%	
Bob Elliott	4	2.0	▲1.4%	
Virgil Trucks†	4	2.0	-	
Ellis Kinder†	3	1.5	-	
Johnny Sain	3	1.5	▲0.9%	
George Case	2	1.0	▲0.4%	
Art Houtteman†	2	1.0	-	
Wes Westrum†	2	1.0	-	
Steve Gromek†	1	0.5	-	
Bob Kuzava†	1	0.5	-	
Eddie Miksis†	1	0.5	-	
Ron Northey†	1	0.5	-	
Rip Sewell	1	0.5	▼0.1%	
Roy Smalley†	1	0.5	-	
Dizzy Trout†	1	0.5	-	

Key to colors
Elected to the Hall. These individuals are also indicated in **bold italics**.
Players who were elected in future elections. These individuals are also indicated in plain italics.

The runoff results show that voters in the second election concentrated their support on the four leaders. Primary results indicate significant gains among returning candidates, with eight players gaining 20 percentage points or more. Between 1962 and 1964, the Hall of Fame reduced eligibility for players to be voted on by the BBWAA from having been retired for at most 30 years to those who had been retired for at most 20 years. This removed numerous popular candidates, including Sam Rice, who had received the most votes among players not elected. Among the 17 candidates receiving at least 10 percent of the vote in 1962, nine were no longer eligible due to the rule change. Combined with the two candidates who were elected, this meant that of the 17 candidates to receive 10 percent or more in 1962, only six appeared on the 1964 ballot.

== J. G. Taylor Spink Award ==
Ring Lardner (1885–1933) received the J. G. Taylor Spink Award honoring a baseball writer. The award was voted at the December 1963 meeting of the BBWAA and included in the summer 1964 ceremonies.
