= Sid Mercer =

American sportswriter

- Born: August 4, 1880; Kerr Township, Champaign County, Illinois
- Died: June 19, 1945 (aged 64); New York City
- Occupation: Sportswriter
- Known for: Baseball and boxing coverage
- Children: Frances Mercer
- Awards: Honor Rolls of Baseball (1946); J. G. Taylor Spink Award (1969)

James Sidney Mercer (August 4, 1880 – June 19, 1945) was an American sports writer who covered mostly boxing and baseball in St. Louis and in New York City.

== Biography ==
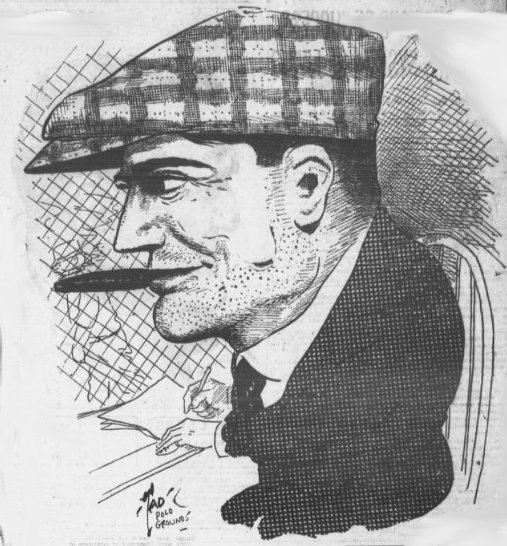
A 1920 caricature of Mercer

Mercer was born to James H. and Laura Ann Search Mercer on August 4, 1880, in Kerr Township, Champaign County, Illinois, where his father farmed and attended school in nearby Paxton, Illinois.

Mercer began his career as a printer's apprentice with the St. Louis Republic. He later wrote for the St. Louis Post-Dispatch, before the St. Louis Browns hired him as their road secretary in 1906. The following year, Mercer was hired at the New York Evening Globe. He later wrote for the New York Evening Journal and William Randolph Hearst's American (later known as the New York Journal American). He was a charter member of the Baseball Writers' Association of America (BBWAA).

Mercer died on June 19, 1945, in New York City. In 1946, Mercer was named to the Honor Rolls of Baseball by the National Baseball Hall of Fame and Museum. In 1969, he was voted the J. G. Taylor Spink Award, the highest award bestowed by the BBWAA.

Mercer was the father of actress Frances Mercer.
