= John Gaffney (baseball) =

American baseball manager and umpire

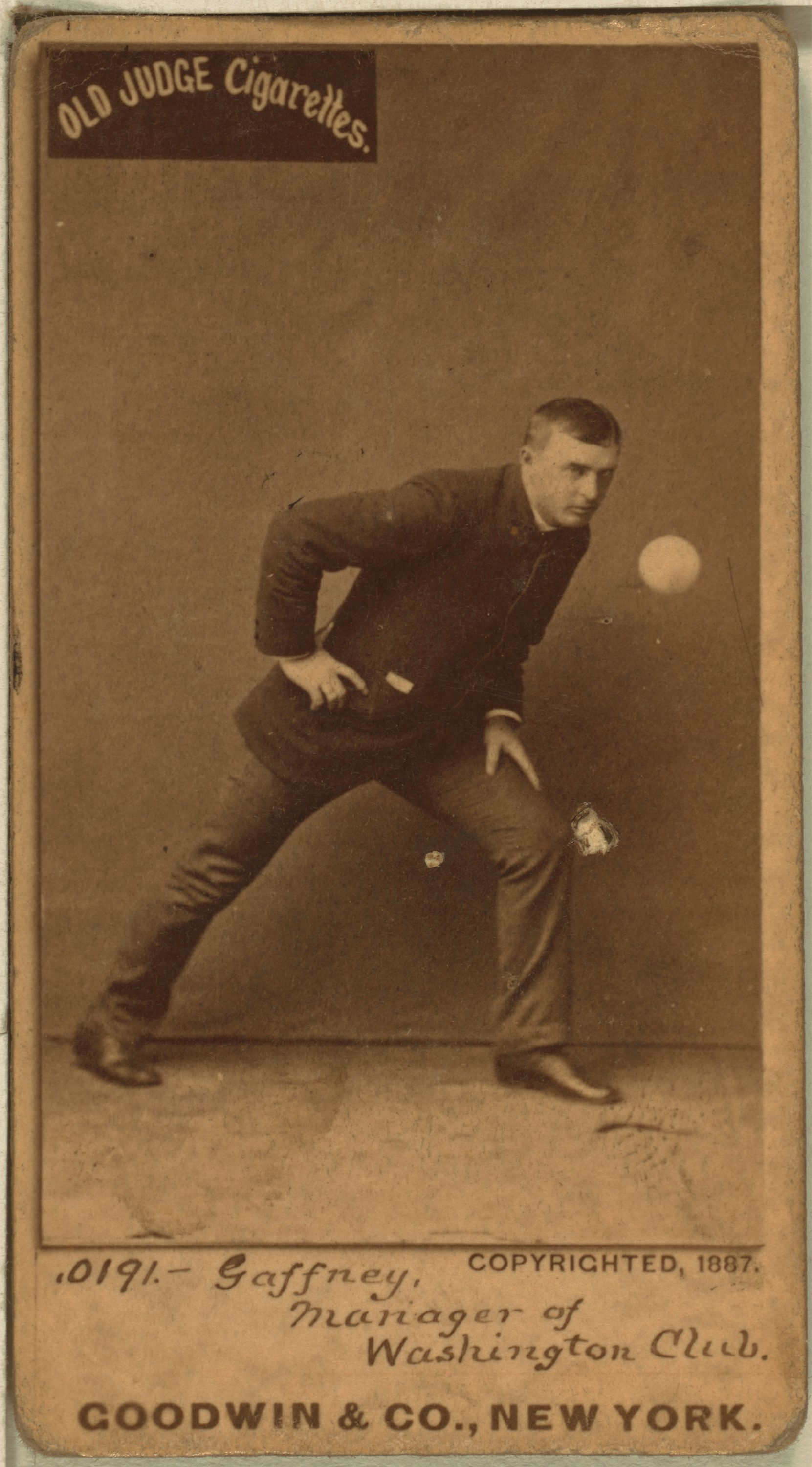
John Gaffney baseball card

John H. Gaffney (June 29, 1855 – August 8, 1913), nicknamed the "King of Umpires" and "Honest John", was an American umpire and manager in Major League Baseball. He was baseball's first great umpire, and played a pioneering role in the use of multiple umpires in baseball games.

== Biography ==
Born in Roxbury, Massachusetts, Gaffney's family moved to Worcester when he was 11. He began playing baseball as a third baseman, but his promising career was ended when he injured his arm throwing a snowball in 1880, reportedly just before being promoted to the National League. He became a printer, and started umpiring college games involving nearby Ivy League teams in 1883.

He joined the National League's umpiring staff in August 1884, with his first game being an 11-inning, 1–0 game between the two teams battling for first place, Providence and Boston. He quickly gained wide respect as a top officiator, and as the league's best judge of balls and strikes. In the middle of his third season, his knowledge of the game was so highly regarded that he was offered the managing position of the Washington Nationals, and he took over the team on August 21, 1886. The team, mired in last place, finished the last third of the season without improving its position; but Gaffney continued in the post for the entire 1887 campaign, with a slight improvement to 7th place. He finished his managing career with 61 wins against 101 losses. He was much-liked by the players, and while he was traveling during the 1887 world championship series, his players – including catcher Connie Mack and future umpiring great Hank O'Day – boarded his train during a Washington stopover and surprised him with the gift of a diamond ring in appreciation of his efforts.

Into the 1880s, baseball had always been played with the use of a single umpire, but by late in the decade it was becoming apparent that this was an unsatisfactory arrangement for the most important games. The 1886 World's Championship Series had witnessed a two-game experiment in which each team selected an umpire – both positioned behind the catcher – with a third official, called a referee, positioned behind the pitcher and able to move about the bases. However, the referee was only permitted to make calls when the two umpires either disagreed or requested his decision; this system was deemed a failure by all observers. The following year, Gaffney was selected by the NL as one of the two umpires to work the 1887 series, along with Kick Kelly, who was regarded as the best umpire in the American Association from 1883 to 1886 before managing that league's Louisville team in 1887. The two worked out a system whereby one umpire would work behind home plate, calling balls and strikes, while the other positioned himself in the field to make calls on the bases. This format was a decided success, and although it was not until almost 1910 that two umpires per game became standard, it formed the basis for the multiple umpire systems which followed. Gaffney later umpired in the 1888 and 1889 championship series, and again for three games in the 1892 NL championship series, for a total of 37 postseason games – a 19th-century record.

After the 1887 series, Gaffney and Kelly both returned to umpiring, although they switched leagues in the process – Kelly moved to the NL for the 1888 season, while Gaffney switched to the American Association for 1888–89, where he received a salary of $2,500 plus road expenses, making him easily the best-paid umpire. In the American Association, Gaffney pioneered the practice of moving from behind the catcher to behind the pitcher when a batter reached first base, a crucial move in the days of solitary umpires. He made other innovations, including calling balls fair or foul depending on where they cleared the fence rather than where they landed, and creating a shirt in which extra baseballs could be stored. After each season, he reported omissions and inadequacies in the rules to the league, and many of his suggested revisions were enacted.

Mack, who was a rookie catcher for Gaffney's 1887 team and later caught for 5 years in which Gaffney umpired, described him as the perfect umpire; umpiring legend Bill Klem noted that he was the first to be widely called "King of Umpires".

Gaffney moved to the Players' League for its sole season in 1890 before returning to the NL in September 1891. The stress of 19th century umpiring, when players and fans demonstrated tremendous abusiveness and hostility toward the lone umpires, began to take its toll, however, and Gaffney was released by the NL after the 1893 season due to his increasing drinking. After beginning 1894 in the Eastern League, he returned to the NL in mid-season, but his alcohol abuse continued and he was again let go. He umpired in the Eastern League again from 1895 to 1897 before coming back to the NL in 1899–1900, joining Tom Lynch in becoming one of only two men to umpire in 12 major league seasons in the 19th century.

He umpired college games near Worcester after 1900, and later moved to New York City, where he worked as a night watchman.

Gaffney died in poverty at age 58 in New York City. Following his death, Mack arranged a benefit game in Worcester between his Philadelphia Athletics and the Boston Red Sox, played on October 5, 1916, to pay for a monument for Gaffney's grave. In 1946, Gaffney was included in the Honor Rolls of Baseball.

== Quotes ==
- "I have studied the rules thoroughly. I keep my eyes wide open, and I follow the ball with all possible dispatch. With the players I try to keep as even tempered as I can, always speaking to them gentlemanly yet firmly. I dislike to fine, and in all my experience have not inflicted more than $300 in fines, and I never found it necessary to order a player from the field. Pleasant words to players in passion will work far better than fines." – as quoted in The Sporting News, April 25, 1891
- "He was perfect. He would follow a ball all the way from the pitcher, and when he made his decision, he would say, 'That was one-eighth of an inch outside' – or 'That was one-eighth of an inch too low,' and he was right. There has never been another umpire like him." – Connie Mack, in The Sporting News, April 8, 1943

== See also ==
- List of Major League Baseball umpires (disambiguation)

== Sources ==
- Gerlach, Larry R. "John H. Gaffney", in Baseball's First Stars, The Society for American Baseball Research, 1996.
- The Sporting News, 1886–1887.
