= William J. Slocum =

American sportswriter (1883–1943)

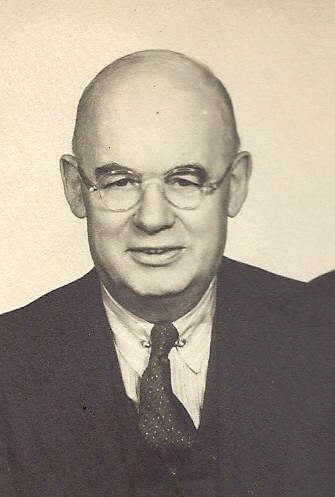
- Slocum in the 1940s
- Born: December 17, 1883; Winsted, Connecticut
- Died: May 6, 1943 (aged 59); New York City, New York
- Occupation: Sports journalist
- Awards: Honor Rolls of Baseball (1946)

William Joseph "Bill" Slocum (December 17, 1883 – May 6, 1943) was an American sports writer who wrote for the New York Times and other newspapers. He covered the New York Yankees and was a president of the Baseball Writers' Association of America.

== Early life ==
Slocum was born and raised in Winsted, Connecticut, the son of Michael and Sarah Slocum. His father had been a deputy sheriff, and his brother John also had a career in law enforcement, rising to the position of Winsted's police superintendent.

== Education and career ==
After attending high school at St. Thomas Seminary in Hartford, Connecticut, Slocum decided on a career in journalism, and gravitated toward sports. One of his first jobs was as the Winsted correspondent for the Waterbury American. He then became a sportswriter for the Waterbury Republican newspaper. By 1910, he had gotten hired in New York City, joining the sports staff of the New York Times. Slocum spent more than twenty-five years covering baseball for New York newspapers that included the Times, Tribune, Sun, and American.

Slocum married Sarah "Sallie" Egan in 1911. At that time, he was writing for the New York Times. Beginning in the 1910s, he became known for covering the New York Yankees, and he traveled with them when they were on the road, providing information about the team to his own newspaper, as well as to newspapers from other cities. In fact, during the 1920s, some of his columns were syndicated, and his reports on the Yankees, as well as on major league baseball's pennant races, were read in numerous cities. In 1921, he was named to the board of directors of the Baseball Writers' Association of America, a position to which he was re-elected several times.

While Slocum's beat was covering the Yankees, he was regarded by his peers as very fair. But sometimes, Yankee management objected to what he wrote, and in one June 1930 incident, an altercation occurred between Slocum and Ed Barrow, the Yankees' business manager. Slocum, who was reporting for the New York American at that time, had taken the Yankees to task for what he saw as secretive business practices, especially a lack of transparency on the reasons why certain trades were made. But Barrow vehemently disagreed with what Slocum wrote, sought him out, and struck him. While Barrow subsequently apologized, and was demoted from his position with the Yankees, New York baseball writers wanted Barrow fired, which did not happen. Later that year, in October 1930, Slocum was elected president of the Baseball Writers Association. It was widely seen by Slocum's colleagues as both a rebuke of Barrow's actions, as well as a way to demonstrate how much baseball writers respected Slocum's work.

Slocum had many other accomplishments, in addition to reporting. He was credited with being one of the organizers of the New York chapter of the Baseball Writers, and he served as its secretary for thirteen years. And from 1923–1936, he managed the chapter's annual Baseball Writers dinner. Slocum was one of the first radio baseball commentators, broadcasting over stations WJY and WJZ in New York City in 1923; during his program, he shared stories about baseball with the audience. And when articles with Babe Ruth's byline on them appeared in the sports pages around World Series time, they were not written by the Babe, who "not only didn't write his own stuff; he didn't read it," according to Slocum. Ruth and Slocum got along well, and ultimately, Slocum became the Babe's ghostwriter. The Baseball Writers' New York chapter honored Slocum in 1944 by naming an award after him: while some online sources have stated the award was named for him in 1930, in its earliest years, it had no name, and was commonly called the "Long Service award." It was awarded for meritorious service to the game, and perhaps, since Slocum ran the annual dinners, people associated the award with his name. However, it was not until 1944 that the award was officially renamed the William J. Slocum Memorial Award. Slocum was also named to the Honor Rolls of Baseball by the National Baseball Hall of Fame in 1946.

In April 1938, Slocum left sports writing to take a job as a 'contact man' with General Mills, helping with publicity, and arranging the broadcasts of baseball games that the company sponsored. This turned out to be important for Yankees fans: the Yankees' management had previously been opposed to allowing the team's games to be broadcast; they believed that allowing the broadcasts would hurt attendance. Throughout the 1920s and much of the 1930s, the only exception they made was the home opener, as well as network broadcasts of World Series games. In 1938, Slocum helped to broker a deal between several sponsors (including General Mills) and the Yankees management to finally allow 1939 Yankees home games to get on the air. He also negotiated a similar deal with the New York Giants baseball team.

== Later life and death ==
In early January 1943, Slocum's wife died at age 57, and his own health subsequently declined. Slocum died in early May 1943, at age 59. When he died, numerous baseball writers recalled his willingness to mentor up-and-coming writers, his knowledge of sports, and especially, his love for baseball. As one former colleague wrote, "Few men who ever wrote baseball had as many friends among players and writers, and he will be missed in the press boxes, clubhouses, and the dugouts." Slocum's funeral was attended by dignitaries (including Ford Frick, then-president of the National League), radio executives, and fellow journalists.
