= Sporting Life (American newspaper) =

American sports newspaper

- Front page on September 10, 1910, announcing the arrival of "Electric Light Ball"
- Editor: Francis Richter
- Categories: Sports
- Frequency: Weekly (1883–1917, 1922–1924)
- First issue: 1883
- Country: United States
- Based in: Philadelphia, Pennsylvania

The Sporting Life was an American weekly newspaper, published from 1883 to 1917 and from 1922 to 1924, that provided national coverage on sports with a particular focus on baseball and trap shooting. The masthead on the front page of newspaper displayed the motto (shown in image at right): "Devoted to Base Ball, Trap Shooting and General Sports." It was founded in Philadelphia in 1883 by Francis Richter, Thomas Sotesbury Dando, and August Rudolph. Richter was the newspaper's publisher until 1917. He hired correspondents to report from locales across the United States and continued to publish and edit the Sporting Life until 1917. Throughout most of its existence, it was in competition with The Sporting News, which was founded in 1886 and published by the Spink brothers in St. Louis. By 1890, it had "the largest circulation of any sporting or baseball newspaper" in the United States. By 1886, the publication had a circulation base of 40,000 subscribers. Henry Chadwick, sometimes called the "father of baseball", was a regular contributor to the Sporting Life.

The Sporting Life also published several early series of baseball cards that were offered to subscribers. The pre-World War I baseball cards published by the Sporting Life are among the most popular and scarce in the baseball collectible business. The popular series issued by Sporting Life include the M116 series issued in 1910 and 1911 and the W600 series issued from 1902 to 1911.

Back issues of the Sporting Life are accessible in digital format through the LA84 Foundation's digital sports library.
