= Tom Connolly (umpire) =

British-American baseball umpire (1870–1961)

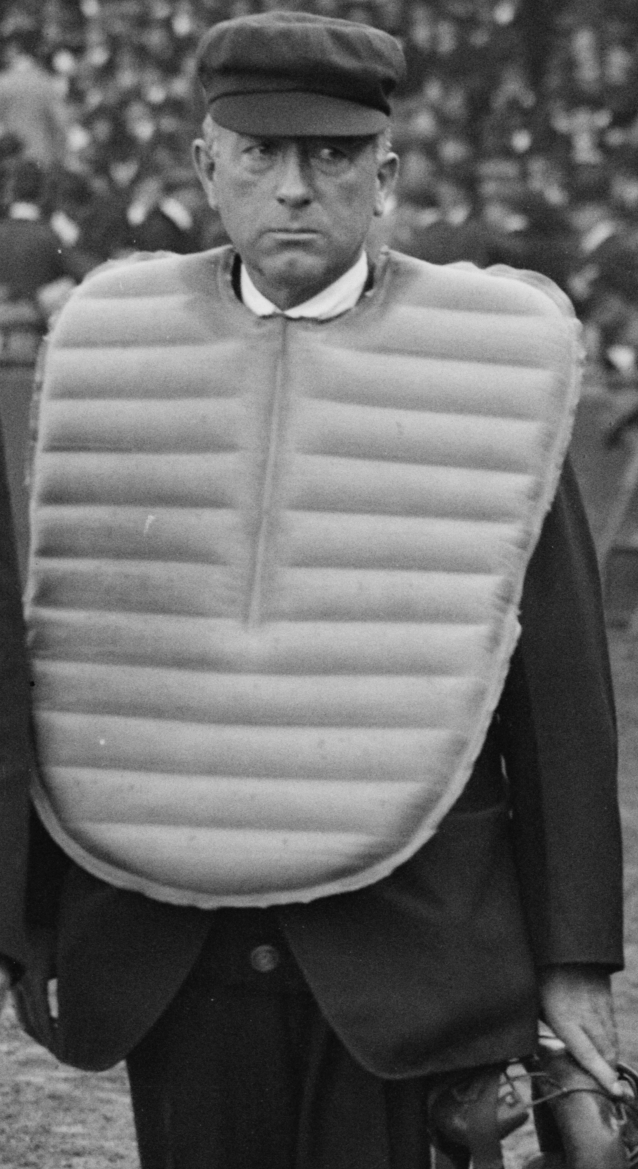
- Connolly at the 1916 World Series
- Born: December 31, 1870; Manchester, England
- Died: April 28, 1961 (aged 90); Natick, Massachusetts, U.S.
- Occupation: Baseball umpire
- Years active: National League (1898–1900); American League (1901–1931)
- Spouse: Margaret Gavin (m. 1902; died 1943)
- Children: 7
- Baseball career

Member of the National

Baseball Hall of Fame
- Induction: 1953
- Election method: Veterans Committee

Thomas Henry Connolly (December 31, 1870 – April 28, 1961) was an English-American umpire in Major League Baseball. He officiated in the National League from 1898 to 1900, followed by 31 years of service in the American League from 1901 to 1931. In over half a century as an American League umpire and supervisor, he established the high standards for which the circuit's arbiters became known, and solidified the reputation for integrity of umpires in the major leagues. In 1953, Connolly became one of the first two umpires ever inducted into the Baseball Hall of Fame, along with Bill Klem.

== Early life ==
Connolly was born in Manchester, England, and played cricket as a boy. It was not until his family emigrated to the United States in 1885, settling in Natick, Massachusetts, that he saw the game of baseball played for the first time, but he was quickly fascinated and resolved himself to learning as much about the game as he could. He immersed himself in the rule book, and within a few years was umpiring for local games. While working in YMCA games, he was discovered by major league umpire Tim Hurst, who obtained a position for Connolly in the New England League, where he umpired from 1894 to 1897.

== MLB career ==
In 1898, the National League (NL) brought Connolly up to the majors, but he was angered by the league president's reluctance to back up umpires' decisions on the field, and resigned in the middle of the 1900 season, then signed with the fledgling American League (AL) in 1901. That league's president, Ban Johnson, was eager to create a reputation for the AL as a solid challenger to the NL, and he gave umpires a greater measure of support than they had previously received, demonstrating that attacks upon umpires would not be tolerated and that their judgment was final. On April 24, 1901, Connolly had the privilege of umpiring, as its sole arbiter, the first AL game ever played.

Although he had begun his career by showing that he was willing to remove players from the field — he ejected more than 10 in his first AL season — he came to earn great respect from the players, and once went 5 full seasons (1925–1929) without ejecting a player. (Note: Some sources say 10 years, but detailed ejection logs on Retrosheet show only 5 years.) He also showed an ability to stand firm against the toughest players in defense of the rules; on September 11, 1912, he called Ty Cobb out for stepping across home plate while batting, after Cobb had batted in a run during an attempted intentional walk. During the ensuing argument, Connolly was struck in the mouth by a bottle thrown by a spectator. His reputation earned him prominent game assignments, including the first AL games ever played at Comiskey Park, Shibe Park, Fenway Park, and Yankee Stadium. Connolly was also the sole AL umpire chosen to work in the first World Series in 1903.

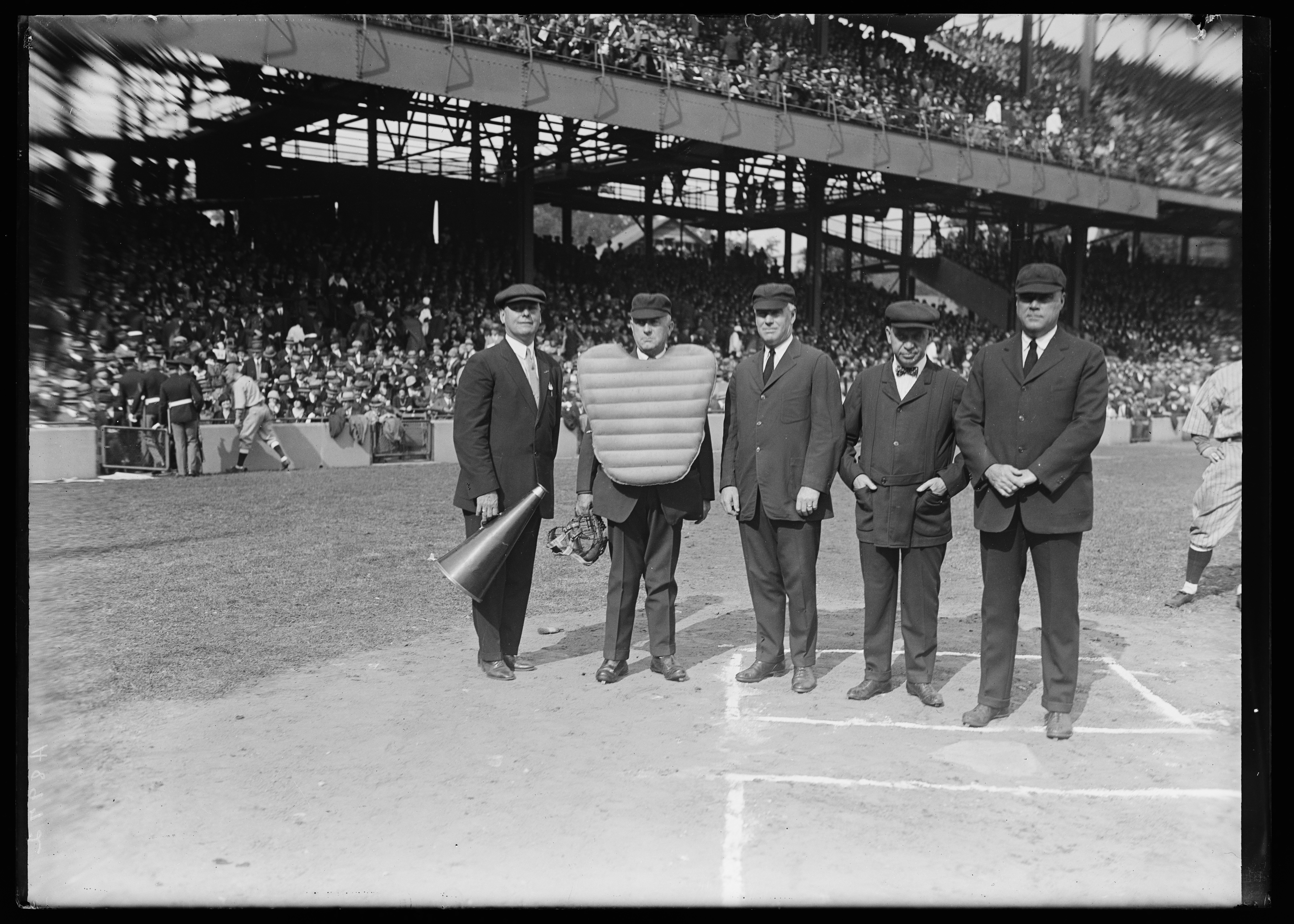
Umpires for the World Series of 1924 lined up before the game with George Phillips, left, official announcer. Left to Right: Phillips, Umpires Bill Dinneen, Bill Klem, Ernest C. Quigley, and Tom Connolly.

In 1931, new AL president Will Harridge was concerned about widespread complaints that the quality of umpiring in the league had deteriorated, and Connolly retired from active field work to become the league's first supervisor of umpires. Traveling throughout the league to work with other umpires and ensure that everyone's work was meeting the same high standards, he remained in that post until 1954, and came to be known as the nation's foremost expert on baseball rules.

In his career, Connolly worked in an AL-record eight World Series: 1903, 1908 (even-numbered games), 1910, 1911, 1913, 1916, 1920 and 1924. He was also the home plate umpire for Addie Joss' perfect game on October 2, 1908, one of four no-hitters in which he called balls and strikes.

== Later life ==
Connolly was named in the Honor Rolls of Baseball in 1946, and was elected to the Baseball Hall of Fame in 1953, one of the first two umpires (the NL's Bill Klem was the other) given that honor. Connolly and Klem are the only two umpires in history to have worked in five decades; Connolly's record of 31 years umpiring American League games was broken by Larry Barnett in 1999.

Connolly died in 1961 at age 90 in Natick, Massachusetts, survived by seven children, and predeceased by his wife, who had died in 1943.

== See also ==
- List of Major League Baseball umpires (disambiguation)
