= Red Faber =

American baseball player and coach (1888–1976)

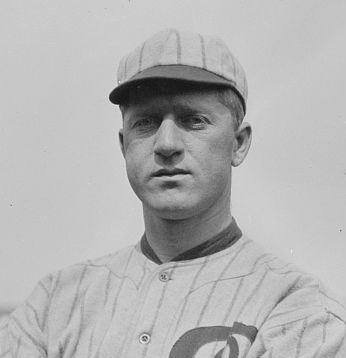
- Faber in 1917
- Pitcher
- Born: September 6, 1888; Cascade, Iowa, U.S.
- Died: September 25, 1976 (aged 88); Chicago, Illinois, U.S.
- Batted: Switch Threw: Right

MLB debut
- April 17, 1914, for the Chicago White Sox

Last MLB appearance
- September 20, 1933, for the Chicago White Sox

MLB statistics
- Win–loss record: 254–213
- Earned run average: 3.15
- Strikeouts: 1,471
- Stats at Baseball Reference

Teams
- Chicago White Sox (1914–1933)

Career highlights and awards
- World Series champion (1917); 2× AL ERA leader (1921, 1922)

Member of the National

Baseball Hall of Fame
- Induction: 1964
- Election method: Veterans Committee

Urban Clarence "Red" Faber (September 6, 1888 – September 25, 1976) was an American right-handed pitcher in Major League Baseball from 1914 through 1933, playing his entire career for the Chicago White Sox. He was a member of the 1919 team but was not involved in the Black Sox scandal. In fact, he missed the World Series due to injury and illness.

Faber won 254 games over his 20-year career, a total which ranked 17th-highest in history upon his retirement. At the time of his retirement, he was the last legal spitballer in the American League; another legal spitballer, Burleigh Grimes, was later traded to the AL and appeared in 10 games for the Yankees in 1934. Faber was inducted into the Baseball Hall of Fame in 1964.

== Early life ==
Faber was born on a farm near Cascade, Iowa, on September 6, 1888. He was of Luxembourgish ancestry. While Faber was a child, his father managed a tavern and later ran the Hotel Faber in Cascade. His father became one of the wealthiest citizens in Cascade. As a teenager, Faber attended college prep academies in Prairie du Chien, Wisconsin and Dubuque, Iowa. By the age of 16, Faber was receiving $2 to pitch Sunday games with a local baseball team in Dubuque.

In 1909, Faber pitched a season for St. Joseph's College, later known as Loras College. In a game against St. Ambrose University that year, he set a school record for strikeouts in a nine-inning game (24). Former Dubuque minor league owner Clarence "Pants" Rowland encouraged Faber to sign with the Class B Dubuque Miners of the Illinois–Indiana–Iowa League.

== Minor leagues ==
Faber started well in the minor leagues. He pitched 15 games for Dubuque in 1909 and returned to the team in 1910, registering an 18–19 win–loss record and a 2.37 earned run average (ERA) in 44 games. He threw a perfect game for the Dubs against the Davenport Prodigals in September of that season.

He also spent time with minor league clubs in Pueblo and Des Moines.

== Major leagues ==
=== Early career ===
Faber broke into the major leagues in 1914, starting 19 games and relieving in another 21; he posted a 2.68 ERA while winning 10 games and saving a league-leading four games (a statistic that was not actually recognized until 1959, and became an official baseball statistic as of 1969). Through the 1910s, he varied between starting and relieving for a team that enjoyed a wealth of pitching talent. In 1915 he won 24 games, tied for second in the American League behind Walter Johnson, and led the league with 50 appearances. In one game that season, he pitched a three-hitter with only 67 pitches.

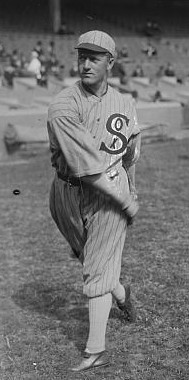
Faber in 1918

In 1917 he had a record of 16–13, and at one point started—and won—three games in two days. He saved his best work for the World Series against the New York Giants. After winning Game 2 in Chicago but losing Game 4 on the road, he came into Game 5 (at home) in relief and picked up the win as the Sox came back from a 5–2 deficit in the seventh inning to win 8–5. Faber went the distance in the clinching Game 6 two days later at the Polo Grounds, picking up his third win of the Series by a 4–2 score. As a consequence, he holds the all-time American League record for pitching decisions in a single World Series with four.

Faber once tried to steal third base when it was already occupied. He said that he saw the lead runner rounding third base on the previous play and he thought that the runner had scored a run. When the pitcher slowly entered his windup, Faber ran toward third base. However, in one game against Boston, he stole home, a rare feat for a pitcher.

Faber spent most of 1918 in the United States Navy due to World War I. He returned in 1919 only to develop arm trouble. He had lost much weight during the war. He finished the year with a 3.83 ERA – the only time in his first nine seasons he posted a mark over 3.00. Those problems, along with a case of the flu possibly related to the Spanish flu pandemic, prevented him from playing in the 1919 World Series against the Cincinnati Reds. Years later, catcher Ray Schalk said that had Faber been available, the Black Sox fix would likely have never happened. Had Faber been healthy, he would almost certainly have gotten some of the starts that went to two of the conspirators, Eddie Cicotte and/or Lefty Williams.

=== Success in the 1920s ===
Faber enjoyed the greatest success of his career in the early 1920s. The live-ball era was beginning, but, thanks to a rule change allowing active 17 spitball pitchers to continue throwing it the remainder of their careers after its 1920 ban, he made one of the most successful transitions of all pitchers. He took advantage of Comiskey Park's spacious dimensions, surrendering only 91 home runs—barely one homer per month—from 1920 to 1931. He was one of only six pitchers to win 100 or more games in both the "dead ball" (through 1920) and live ball eras. Faber finished the 1920 season with 23 wins and led the league in games started.

During the summer of 1921, Faber and several other players had to leave a road trip in Washington after receiving subpoenas for the Black Sox trial in Chicago. Faber made the trip but was not asked to testify and returned to the White Sox without missing a start. He won 25 in 1921 and 21 in 1922, leading the league in ERA (1921–1922), innings (1922) and complete games (1921–1922). He was also among the league leaders in strikeouts each year, while pitching at least 25 complete games and over 300 innings.

Faber achieved most of his success with White Sox teams that were usually barely competitive. They had been one of the top teams in the league in the late 1910s, with a powerful offense. After much of the core of that team was permanently banned in the Black Sox Scandal, the White Sox had only two winning seasons in Faber's last 13 years, never finishing above fifth place. In the 1921 season, Faber posted a terrific 25–15 win–loss record for a scandal-decimated team that limped to a 62–92 finish; from 1921 to 1929 his record was 126–103. In 1927 Faber broke up a 21-game hitting streak by a still capable 40-year-old Ty Cobb. Perhaps his last great performance was a one-hitter at age 40 in 1929.

=== Later career ===
In his last few seasons, Faber returned to relief pitching, coming out of the bullpen 96 times between 1931 and 1933. Faber announced his retirement before the 1934 season. He had pitched 20 consecutive years for the White Sox. He ended his career at age 45 with a 254–213 career record, a 3.15 ERA and 1471 strikeouts. He holds the White Sox franchise record for most games pitched, and held the team records for career wins, starts, complete games and innings until they were later broken by Ted Lyons. After retiring as a player, Faber entered auto sales and real estate. He returned as a White Sox coach for three seasons.

Faber and catcher Ray Schalk started 306 games as a battery, fourth-most of any such duo since 1900.

== Personal life ==
In 1947, Faber married Frances (Fran) Knudtzon, who was nearly 30 years younger than he. Faber said that he was too old for her, but she insisted that they get married. Fran was Lutheran and a divorcee, and the couple married quickly, making the marriage unpopular among Faber's Catholic family. However, some became more accepting with time. The couple had a son the next year, Urban C. Faber II, nicknamed "Pepper". When he was 14 he suffered a broken neck in a near-fatal swimming accident, causing long-term health problems.

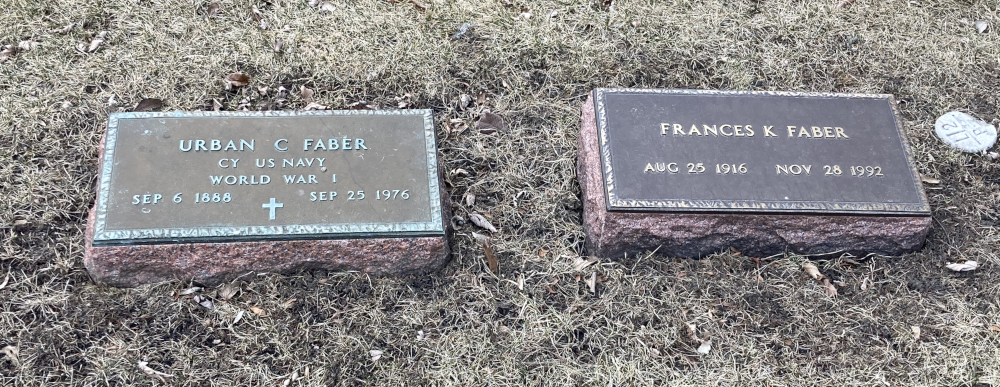
Faber's grave at Acacia Park Cemetery

Faber helped to found Baseball Anonymous, a charitable organization that assisted former baseball players who had run into financial or physical problems. Later he worked on a Cook County highway surveying team until he was nearly 80. He was a longtime smoker, and after suffering two heart attacks in the 1960s began to experience increasing heart and lung issues. He died in Chicago in 1976 and was interred in Acacia Park Cemetery there.

== See also ==
- List of Major League Baseball career wins leaders
- List of Major League Baseball annual ERA leaders
- List of Major League Baseball annual saves leaders
- List of Major League Baseball players who spent their entire career with one franchise
- List of Major League Baseball career hit batsmen leaders
- Luxembourg-American
