= John T. Brush =

American baseball executive (1845–1912)

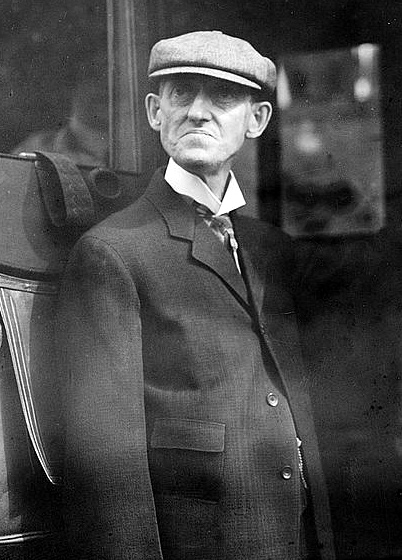
- Brush, c. 1911
- Born: June 15, 1845; Clintonville, New York, U.S.
- Died: November 26, 1912 (aged 67); Louisiana, Missouri, U.S.
- Resting place: Crown Hill Cemetery and Arboretum, Indianapolis, Indiana U.S. Section 23, Lot 33; 39.8182333°N 86.1723439°W
- Occupations: Owner of the Indianapolis Hoosiers (1887–1889); Owner of the Cincinnati Reds (1891–1902); Owner of the New York Giants (1902–1912)
- Awards: 4× NL champion: (1904, 1905, 1911, 1912); World Series champion: (1905); Honor Rolls of Baseball

John Tomlinson Brush (June 15, 1845 – November 26, 1912) was an American baseball executive who is primarily remembered as the principal owner of the New York Giants franchise in Major League Baseball from late in the 1902 season until his death following the 1912 season. He also owned the Indianapolis Hoosiers in the late 1880s, followed by ownership of the Cincinnati Reds for a decade.

Under Brush's leadership, the Giants were revived as a franchise, following a decline during the 1890s. The team won four National League championships and one World Series during his tenure as principal owner. Brush was also a leader in the formation of the rules that govern the modern World Series. He was one of 11 executives honored by the Baseball Hall of Fame in the Honor Rolls of Baseball in 1946.

== Biography ==
=== Early years ===
Born in Clintonville, New York, Brush was orphaned at four years old and was raised by his grandfather until he left to enter business college at age 17. During the Civil War, Brush enlisted in the First New York Artillery in 1863 and served as a private in Company K. After the war's end, he went into business running clothing stores in Albany, Troy and Lockport, New York. He moved to Indianapolis in 1875, eventually opening a department store, and became involved in local baseball as a means of promoting his store. He built a ballpark in 1882, and it became home to the Indianapolis Hoosiers of the American Association for their only major league season in 1884; they played in the Western League before that circuit folded after the 1885 campaign.

=== Franchise ownerships ===
When the National League (NL) put the St. Louis Maroons franchise up for sale after the 1886 season, Brush bought it and relocated the team to Indianapolis. The team was renamed as the Indianapolis Hoosiers, and competed in the NL for three seasons (1887–1889). Brush renovated his ballpark, adding a special celebrity box which attracted such figures as President Benjamin Harrison, poet James Whitcomb Riley, and future novelist Booth Tarkington. In 1888, he offered a tryout to Bud Fowler, but ultimately decided not to challenge the sport's color line. Also in 1898, a proposal from Brush (variously referred to as the "Brush act", "Brush law", or "Brush rule") was adopted by the National League to ban "obscene, indecent, or vulgar language" during any game, with punishment being a suspension of the offender, potentially for life, depending on circumstances. The effort was unsuccessful and was considered a failure. Brush also devised a salary scale system which was designed to curtail player salaries, a move which helped contribute to the breakaway Players' League in 1890.

When the Indianapolis team folded after the 1889 season, Brush was compensated with $67,000 and a share of the New York Giants franchise, along with a promise of the next available team; he quickly acquired the Cincinnati Reds club after its financial collapse during the three-league competition of 1890. Instead of relocating, he kept the team in Cincinnati, and survived a challenge from a short-lived American Association competitor, the Cincinnati Kelly's Killers. Brush frequently was at odds with sportswriter Ban Johnson of the city's Commercial Gazette, and in an attempt to reduce the writer's local influence he helped Johnson become president of the re-formed Western League—a move which eventually backfired when the league achieved major status as the American League (AL) in 1901, with Johnson remaining as president.

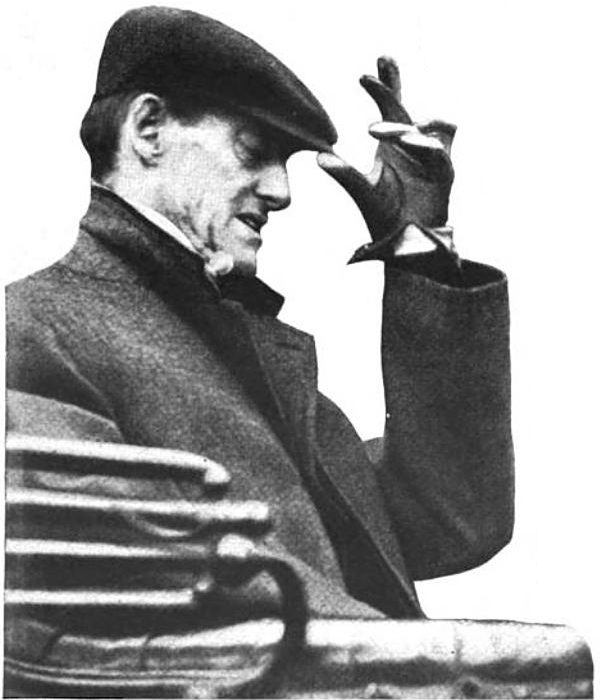
Brush in 1912, confined to an "invalid's chair" due to progressive ataxia and rheumatism

As chairman of the NL's executive committee, Brush took a lead role in combating the AL, joining with Giants majority owner Andrew Freedman to sabotage the AL's Baltimore club by offering the managing jobs of the New York and Cincinnati teams to John McGraw and Joe Kelley respectively; Baltimore was forced to relocate to New York after 1902, eventually becoming the New York Yankees. The acrimony also contributed to controversy in the selection of a new NL president in 1902, as the Giants supported incumbent president Nicholas Young against Albert Spalding, who favored better relations with the AL; in the deadlock, both candidates were forced to withdraw, with Harry Pulliam being selected as a compromise choice.

In August 1902, Brush sold his interest in the Reds to a group headed by August "Garry" Herrmann, for $180,000. At the end of September, Freedman left baseball, with Brush taking over as majority owner and team president of the Giants. When the Giants won the 1904 NL pennant, Brush refused to allow the team to meet Boston's defending champions (then known as the Boston Americans) in a 1904 World Series, due to his animosity toward Johnson; a permanent agreement between the leagues was eventually made after meeting some of Brush's conditions, and the Giants won the 1905 World Series against the Philadelphia Athletics.

=== Later years ===
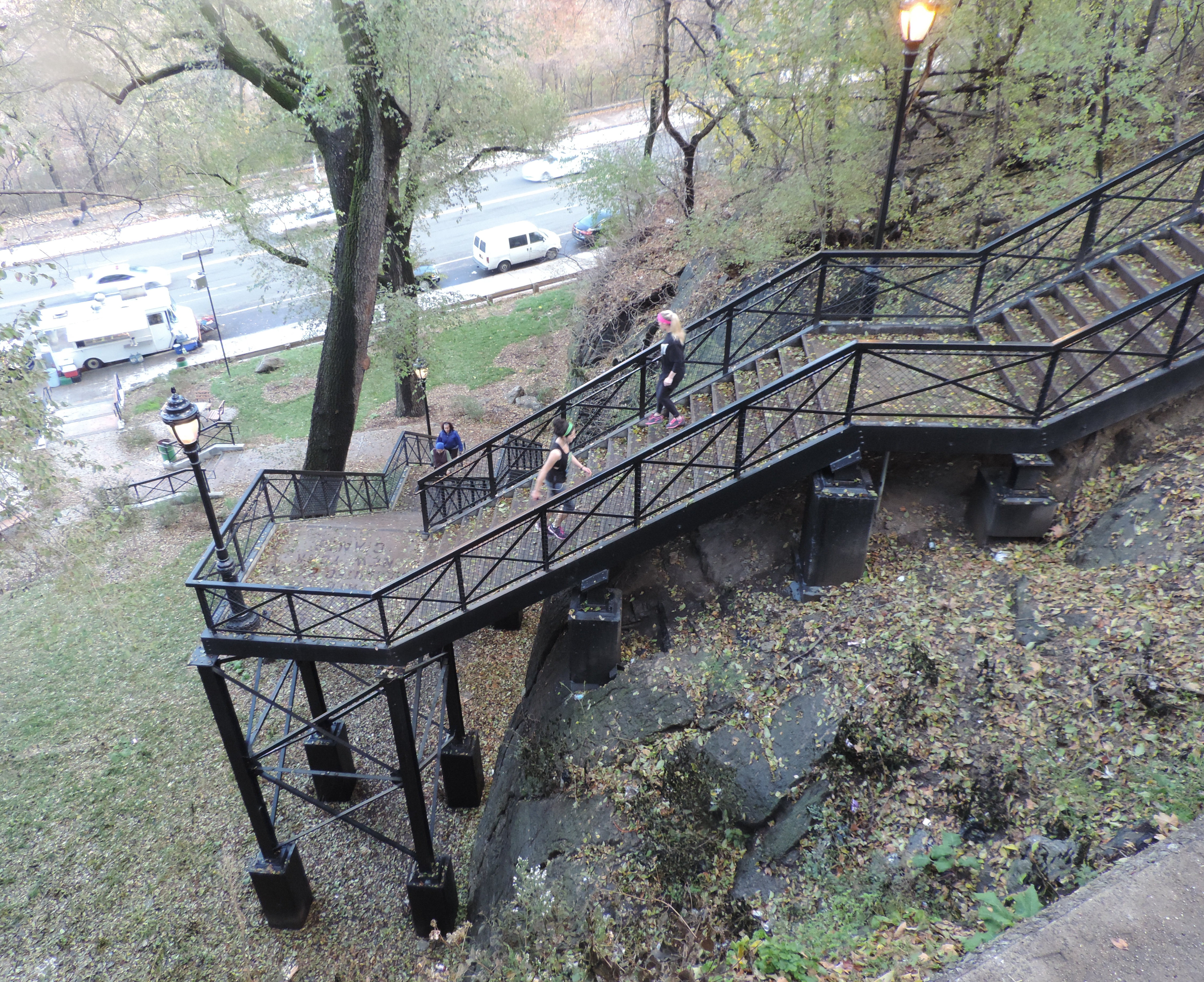
The John T. Brush Stairway, one of only two structures that survive from the Polo Grounds era

Brush's health deteriorated quickly after becoming majority owner in 1902, as he suffered from locomotor ataxia, a nervous system affliction, as well as rheumatism. The Giants won another pennant in 1911, losing that season's World Series, the same year in which he oversaw the reconstruction of the Polo Grounds. After the team repeated as NL champions the following season, Brush attended games of the 1912 World Series. The Giants were again defeated, and his failing health was apparent, particularly in the aftermath of an auto accident that September 11 in which his car was struck by a truck and overturned, causing two broken ribs. After the Series he left by train to recuperate in California, but died in the early hours of November 26 in his private railroad car near Louisiana, Missouri. His railroad car was detached and rerouted to St. Louis, and his body was returned to Indianapolis. His funeral was held at St. Paul's Episcopal Church, with accompanying Masonic rites. He was succeeded as Giants president by his son-in-law, Harry Hempstead.

In 1913, the Giants organization constructed a stairway from the ticket booths on Coogan's Bluff to the Polo Grounds below, and presented it to the City of New York in honor of its late owner. The John T. Brush Stairway still stands, and was restored by the city in 2013.

== Sources ==
- Baseball: The Biographical Encyclopedia (2000). Kingston, New York: Total/Sports Illustrated. ISBN 1-892129-34-5.
- Reach Official American League Base Ball Guide (1913). Philadelphia, Pennsylvania: A.J. Reach Co.
- Allen, Lee. The National League Story (1961). New York: Hill & Wang.
- Allen, Lee. The American League Story (1962). New York: Hill & Wang.
