= Tim Hurst =

American baseball manager and umpire

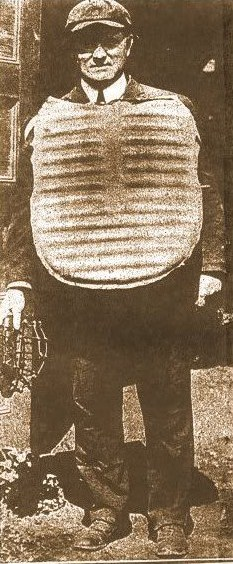
- Manager / Umpire
- Born: June 30, 1865; Ashland, Pennsylvania, U.S.
- Died: June 4, 1915 (aged 49); Pottsville, Pennsylvania, U.S.
- Batted: Unknown Threw: Unknown

MLB debut
- April 15, 1898, for the St. Louis Browns

Last MLB appearance
- October 9, 1898, for the St. Louis Browns

MLB statistics
- Games managed: 154
- Managerial record: 39–111
- Winning percentage: .260

Teams
- St. Louis Browns (1898)

Timothy Carroll Hurst (June 30, 1865 – June 4, 1915) was an American sports official who worked as an umpire and manager in Major League Baseball and as a boxing referee in championship fights.

His baseball umpiring career lasted 16 seasons from 1891 to 1909.

For one season, in 1898, he became the on-field manager of the St. Louis Browns, at which the team had a record of 39–111 in 154 games. After his season of managing the Browns, he returned to his umpiring career.

From 1891 through 1904 he umpired in the National League, then finished his career in the American League from 1905-1909.

Noted for his pugnacious and combative style, Hurst was suspended on several occasions for refusing to report player misconduct to his league office, insisting instead he ought to be allowed to settle matters with players personally, often engaging them in fights after the game was over.

During a game on June 6, 1893 between the Chicago Colts and New York Giants at New York's Polo Grounds, Hurst made several controversial calls which made the "Bleacherites ... feverishly indignant." At the end of the game, "a number of ill-bred fellows" from the crowd jumped the railings and rushed at Hurst. With the help of three or four policemen, Hurst escaped with at most a scratch.

During a game on August 4, 1897 between Cincinnati and Pittsburgh at Cincinnati's League Park, Hurst angered fans by ruling that Cincinnati's Bug Holliday was tagged out despite having been deliberately tripped by Pittsburgh's Dick Padden. After a fan threw a beer glass onto the field which landed at Hurst's feet, Hurst threw the glass back into the crowd, hitting an innocent fan in the head who "fell to the floor like an ox hit in the head with a sledgehammer." The man was carried off unconscious and in serious condition while police had to keep the crowd from attacking Hurst. Hurst was ultimately arrested and charged with assault.

In 1946 Hurst was among several umpires named to the Honor Rolls of Baseball by the Baseball Hall of Fame, at a time when no umpires had yet received full membership in the Hall.

Hurst was born in Ashland, Pennsylvania and died at the age of 49 in Pottsville, Pennsylvania.

He is interred at the Calvary Cemetery in Woodside, Queens, New York.
