= Baseball Writers' Association of America =

American journalist association

- Abbreviation: BBWAA
- Founded: October 14, 1908
- Field: Sportswriting
- Members: At least 394 (2022)
- President: Bob Nightengale (2025)
- Vice President: Marc Topkin (2025)

The Baseball Writers' Association of America (BBWAA) is a professional association for journalists writing about Major League Baseball for daily newspapers, magazines, and qualifying websites. The organization was founded in 1908 and is known for its annual awards and voting on membership in the Baseball Hall of Fame.

== Early years ==
The BBWAA was founded on October 14, 1908, to improve working conditions for sportswriters in the early part of the 20th century; It also sought to promote uniformity of scoring methods, and to professionalize the press box, such that access was limited only to working reporters, telegraphers, and others who had a reason to be there.

The organization began with 43 founding members. They included Joe S. Jackson, who became the association's first president. At that time, Jackson was the sporting editor (today called sports editor) of the Detroit Free Press. Also selected as officers were Irving E. Sanborn of the Chicago Tribune, syndicated columnist Hugh Fullerton, and The Boston Globe baseball writer Tim Murnane. A second meeting was held in New York City in December; Sanborn decided he could not serve as an officer at that time, and he was replaced by William Weart of the Philadelphia Times. The slate of officers was ratified, and anyone who wrote about baseball in major league cities was eligible for membership. This policy changed, however, in December 1913, at which time it was decided that minor-league baseball writers could also become members. Then, Jackson became a dominant force in the early years of the baseball writers, being elected as president of the association during nine consecutive terms.

Jackson finally retired in 1919, while Sanborn returned to assume the position of president. After that, Jackson became a member of the BBWAA Board of Directors.

=== Web membership ===
In 2007, the BBWAA opened its membership to web-based writers employed on a full-time basis by "websites that are credentialed by MLB for post-season coverage." In 2015, the BBWAA opened up membership to writers directly employed by MLB.com, which has been credited for a shift in votes in the 2026 Hall of Fame balloting.

== Mission ==
The organization's primary function is to work with Major League Baseball and individual teams to assure clubhouse and press-box access for BBWAA members. In addition, BBWAA members also elect players to the National Baseball Hall of Fame, which is the organization's most public function. All writers with 10 continuous years of membership in the BBWAA, plus active BBWAA membership at any time in the preceding 10 years, are eligible to vote for the Hall of Fame. The BBWAA also votes annually for the Most Valuable Player Award, Cy Young Award, Jackie Robinson Rookie of the Year Award, and Manager of the Year Award in each of the two major leagues. The Hall of Fame also empowers the BBWAA's Historical Overview Committee, made up of 11 or 12 veteran BBWAA members, to formulate the annual ballot for the Veterans Committee.

Considering the ready availability of television broadcasts for the majority of baseball games, plus instant access to information through the Internet, some have called into question why the BBWAA has not broadened its membership rules to include broadcasters and researchers. (Similar arguments were made for the inclusion of Web-based journalists, before the BBWAA added Web writers to its ranks in December 2007.)

Others have openly questioned why the BBWAA is involved in the award and Hall of Fame voting processes at all, citing in some cases journalistic integrity and the need to remain unbiased in their coverage of newsworthy events.

== Awards ==
=== Voting ===
The BBWAA's most public function is to annually vote on candidates for the National Baseball Hall of Fame.

In addition, the BBWAA is responsible for voting on several annual awards in each major league which are presented annually at the New York chapter's dinner:

- Most Valuable Player Award (one for each league)
- Cy Young Award (one for each league)
- Rookie of the Year Award (one for each league)
- Manager of the Year Award (one for each league)
- Relief Pitcher of the Year Award (one for each league) (beginning in 2026)

In or about 2000, the BBWAA took over the voting responsibility for the Edgar Martínez Award, given each year to the outstanding designated hitter in the American League.

From 1953 to 1962, the BBWAA presented a "Sophomore of the Year Award" in each league.

In 1997, a 36-member BBWAA panel selected the Major League Baseball All-Time Team.

=== BBWAA Career Excellence Award ===
The annual BBWAA Career Excellence Award is the highest award given by the BBWAA. First awarded in 1962 to J. G. Taylor Spink, longtime publisher of The Sporting News, it was named the J. G. Taylor Spink Award until adopting its current name in February 2021. It has been awarded annually for "meritorious contributions to baseball writing", except for one year during the 1994–95 Major League Baseball strike. Recipients are not considered members of the National Baseball Hall of Fame but are permanently recognized in an exhibit at the Hall's library.

=== Chapter awards ===
For information about the chapter and its presiding officer, see footnote and Red Foley (past chairman).

==== New York chapter ====
- Babe Ruth Award – postseason MVP since 2007; previously awarded to the best postseason performer of the World Series from 1949 to 2006.
- Willie, Mickey and the Duke Award – to a group of players forever linked in baseball history.
- Joe DiMaggio "Toast of the Town" Award – for a player who has become a New York favorite.
- Arthur and Milton Richman "You Gotta Have Heart" Award – presented to a member of the baseball community who has overcome difficult circumstances.
- Sid Mercer–Dick Young Player of the Year Award – presented to the best player on either the Yankees or Mets.
- Casey Stengel "You Can Look It Up" Award – presented to someone never previously honored by the chapter, usually to recognize a career achievement.
- Joan Payson/Shannon Dalton Forde Award (formerly the Joan Payson Award, until 2016) – for excellence in community service.
- Ben Epstein–Dan Castellano "Good Guy" Award – presented to a baseball person, often a New York player, for their candor and accessibility to writers.
- William J. Slocum–Jack Lang Award – for long and meritorious service; usually presented to a recently retired player, media personality, or executive.

==== Other chapters ====
- Cincinnati: Cincinnati Reds Hall of Fame (voting by Cincinnati chapter since 1998)
- Cincinnati: Ernie Lombardi Award (team MVP)
- Cincinnati: Team Pitcher of the Year
- Cleveland: Bob Feller Man of the Year Award (player or other team personnel) (since 1946)
- Cleveland: Frank Gibbons-Steve Olin Good Guy Award (since 1968)
- Detroit: Tiger of the Year (since 1965)
- Houston: Darryl Kile Good Guy Award (since 2003)
- Minnesota:
- Montreal: Montreal Expos Player of the Year (discontinued in 2004)
- Philadelphia: Most Valuable Player, Most Valuable Pitcher, Special Achievement, Good Guy Award, and Charlie Manuel Award for Service and Passion to Baseball (since 2004)
- St. Louis: Darryl Kile Good Guy Award (since 2003)
- Toronto: Neil MacCarl Award (since 1977)
- Note: The MLB Rookie of the Year Award was established by the Chicago chapter in 1940 and was known as the J. Louis Comiskey Memorial Award (after the Chicago White Sox owner of the 1930s). In 1947, the award became an official MLB award (voted on by the national BBWAA), with Jackie Robinson as its first recipient. In July 1987, the award was renamed the Jackie Robinson Award (see § Awards voting, above).

== Presidents ==
For a list of presidents and secretaries from 1908 to the present, see footnote During the 2012 World Series, the Association elected its first female president, Susan Slusser, of the San Francisco Chronicle.

== See also ==
- Honor Rolls of Baseball (writers)
- Baseball awards
- List of Major League Baseball awards
- Official scorer
- National Collegiate Baseball Writers Association
- National Sports Media Association
- Pro Basketball Writers Association
- United States Basketball Writers Association (college)
- Football Writers Association of America (college)
- Pro Football Writers Association
- Professional Hockey Writers Association

== Footnotes ==
"Baseball Writers Unite." Washington Post, October 15, 1908, p. 9.
