= List of people from Baton Rouge, Louisiana =

This is a list of notable people who were born, raised, or lived in Baton Rouge, Louisiana at some point.

== Sports figures ==
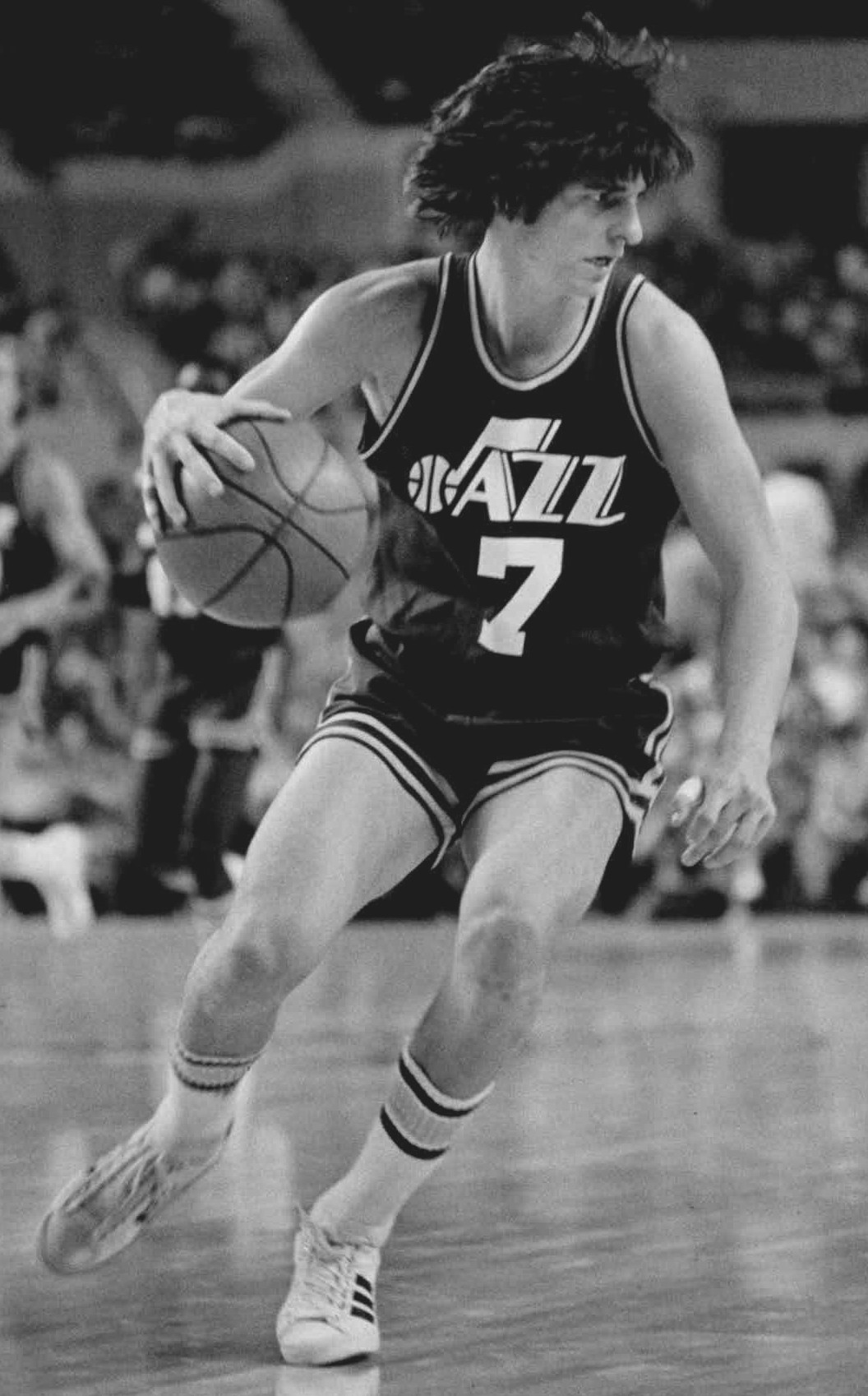
Pete Maravich

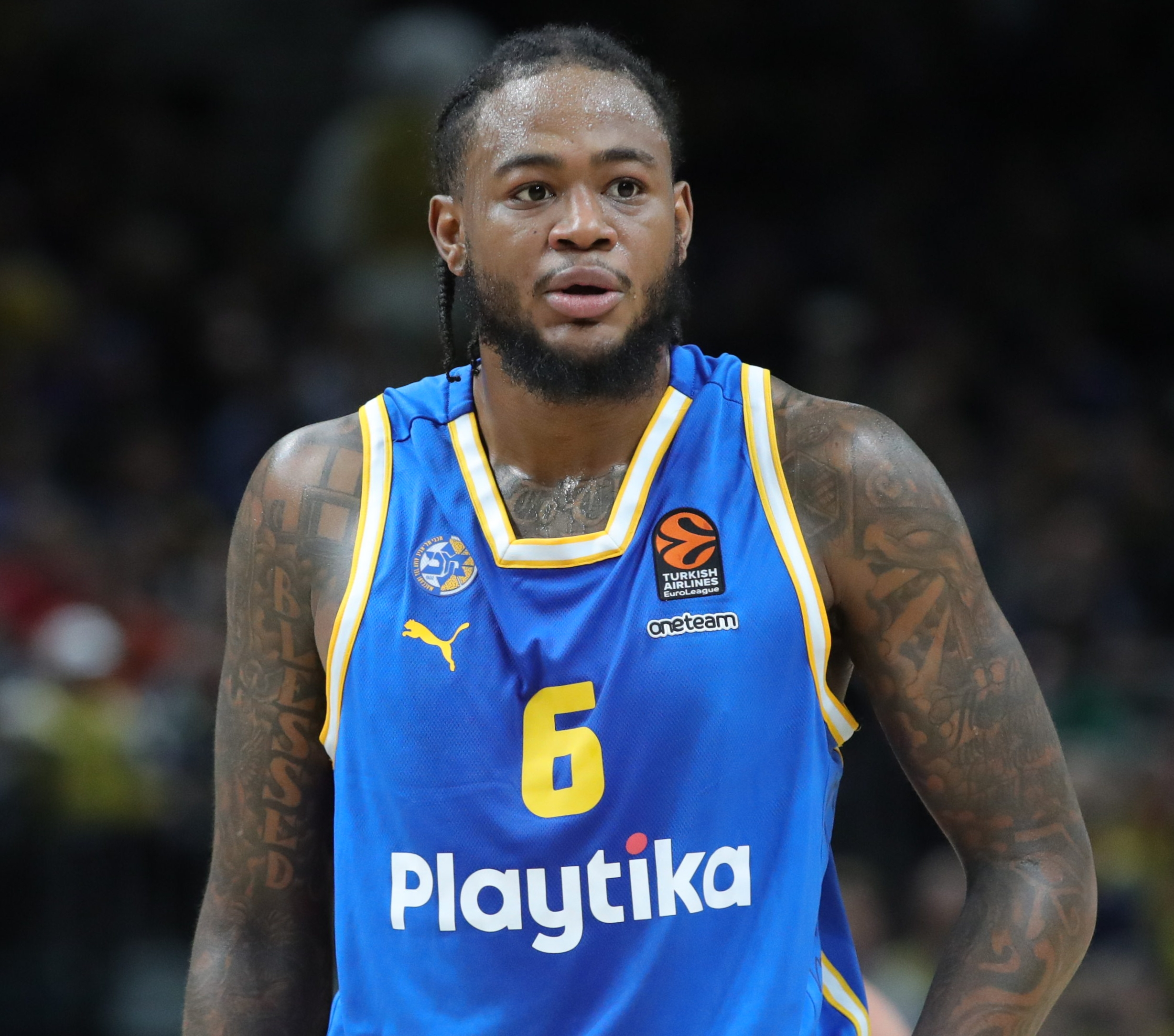
Jarell Martin

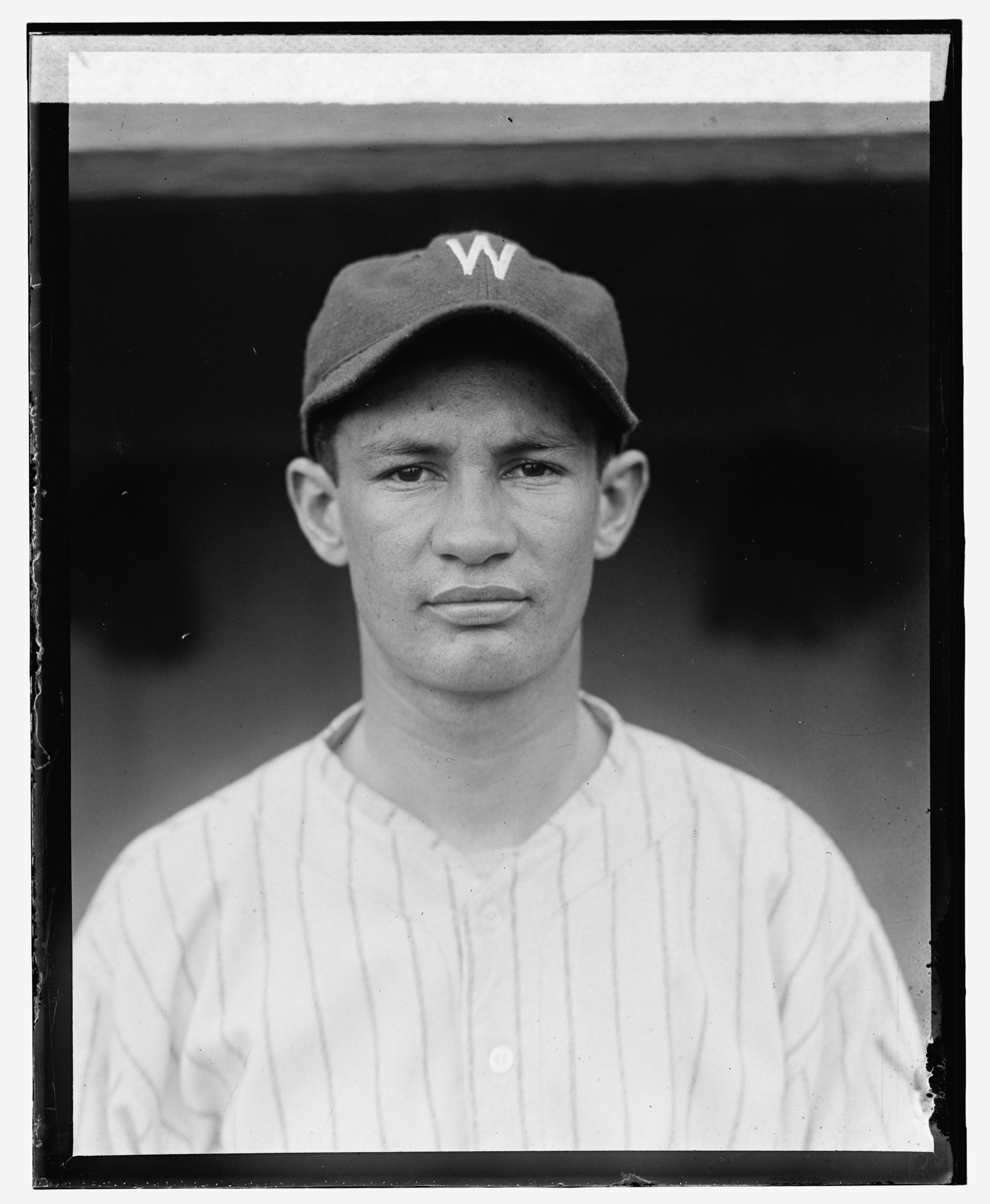
Buddy Myer

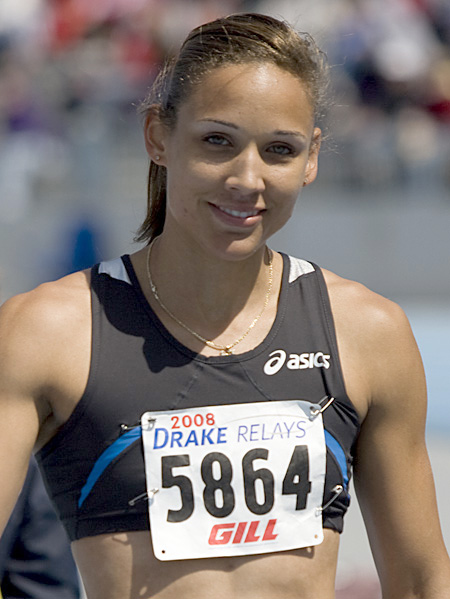
Lolo Jones

- Seimone Augustus, former WNBA player who is currently an assistant coach for the LSU Tigers women's basketball (b. 1984)
- Frank Bartley, basketball player for Pallacanestro Trieste of the Lega Basket Serie A (b. 1994)
- Brandon Bass, NBA power forward (b. 1985)
- Billy Cannon, former All-American and 1959 Heisman Trophy winner (d. 2018)
- Michael Clayton, former NFL wide receiver (b. 1982)
- Willie Davenport, Olympics gold medal winner
- Brad Davis, college football coach (b. 1980)
- Glen Davis, NBA power forward (b. 1986)
- David Dellucci, MLB outfielder for the Cleveland Indians (b. 1973)
- Warrick Dunn, NFL running back for the Tampa Bay Buccaneers (b. 1975)
- Chad Durbin, MLB pitcher for the Cleveland Indians (b. 1977)
- Alan Faneca, NFL guard for the Pittsburgh Steelers (b. 1976)
- Langston Galloway, NBA G League player for the College Park Skyhawks (b. 1991)
- Randall Gay, NFL cornerback for the New Orleans Saints (b. 1982)
- Stephen Gostkowski, American football placekicker
- Darryl Hamilton, MLB outfielder for various clubs (b. 1964)
- Jeremy Hill, NFL running back for the New England Patriots
- Russ Johnson, major league infielder (b. 1973)
- Lolo Jones, track and field athlete
- Victor Jones, NFL player
- Stefan LeFors, former quarterback in American and Canadian football
- Norman LeJeune, former NFL football safety
- Donnie Lewis, NFL player
- Pete Maravich, LSU and NBA player in Basketball Hall of Fame
- Jarell Martin (born 1994), American basketball player for Maccabi Tel Aviv of the Israeli Basketball Premier League
- Skylar Mays, NBA player for the Atlanta Hawks (b. 1997)
- Todd McClure, former NFL offensive lineman for Atlanta Falcons (b. 1977)
- Jerome Meyinsse (b. 1988), basketball player in the Israeli Basketball Premier League
- Rod Milburn (b. 1976), Olympic gold medalist
- Travis Minor, NFL running back, St. Louis Rams
- Yohanan Moyal (b. 1965), Israeli Olympic gymnast
- Buddy Myer, MLB 2-time All-Star second baseman, batting and stolen base titles
- Aaron Nola, MLB All Star baseball pitcher (b. 1993)
- Jonathan Papelbon, MLB pitcher for the Boston Red Sox (b. 1980)
- Carly Patterson, Olympic gold medalist (b. 1988)
- Bob Pettit, Basketball Hall of Famer (1932–2026)
- Andy Pettitte, MLB pitcher for the New York Yankees (b. 1972)
- Bobby Phills, former professional basketball player (d. 2000)
- Tyrece Radford (born 1999), basketball player in the Israeli Basketball Premier League
- Brandon Sampson (born 1997), professional basketball player for Hapoel Be'er Sheva of the Israeli Basketball Premier League
- Pat Screen, former LSU quarterback, mayor-president of East Baton Rouge Parish, 1981–1988 (1943–1994)
- Ben Sheets, MLB pitcher for the Milwaukee Brewers (b. 1978)
- Josh Smith, baseball player (b. 1997)
- Marcus Spears, NFL defensive end for the Dallas Cowboys (b. 1982)
- Johnathan Stove, basketball player (b. 1995)
- Sasha "Magi" Sullivan, esports player (b. 1999)
- Jim Taylor, Football Hall of Famer (b. 1935)
- Tyrus Thomas, NBA forward for the Chicago Bulls (b. 1986)
- Reggie Tongue, NFL safety for the Kansas City Chiefs, Seattle Seahawks, New York Jets, and Oakland Raiders
- Reggie Torbor, NFL linebacker for the Miami Dolphins
- Jimmy Williams, NFL cornerback who graduated from Vanderbilt University and played for the Houston Texans
- Joe Williams, NFL player
- Walter Williams, NFL player
- Kevin Windham, professional motocross racer

== Arts and entertainment ==
- Boosie Badazz, rap artist (b. 1982)
- Wes Brown, actor, We Are Marshall, Glory Road, Beach Girls
- Andrei Codrescu, writer
- Bill Conti, conductor and composer
- Stormy Daniels, porn star and porn director (b. 1979)
- Trent Dawson, actor, As the World Turns (b. 1971)
- Donna Douglas, actress, The Beverly Hillbillies (1933–2015)
- Louis Edmonds, actor, All My Children
- Wesley Eure, actor, author
- Foxx, rap artist
- John Fred, singer, best known for the song "Judy in Disguise (With Glasses)" (1941–2005)
- Fredo Bang, rap artist
- Larry Garner, blues guitarist
- Kevin Gates, rap artist
- Slim Harpo, blues musician
- Dale Houston, singer, best known for the song "I'm Leaving It Up to You" (1940–2007)
- Randy Jackson, musician, record producer, and American Idol judge (b. 1956)
- Chris Thomas King, blues musician and actor (b. 1962)
- David Lambert, actor (b. 1992)
- Van Lathan, journalist, producer, podcaster, and political commentator
- Don Lemon, CNN TV personality and host of CNN Tonight (b. 1966)
- Lil Phat, rap artist
- Jonathon "Boogie" Long, blues rock musician
- Master P, rap artist
- Rod Masterson, actor (1945–2013)
- Reiley McClendon, actor (b. 1990)
- John McConnell, actor, radio personality (b. 1958)
- Casey McQuiston, author of NYT bestseller Red, White, and Royal Blue
- Cleo Moore, actress (d. 1973)
- Elemore Morgan Jr., landscape painter and photographer (d. 2008)
- Brooks Nader, model and actress (b. 1997)
- James Paul, conductor emeritus of the Baton Rouge Symphony (b. 1940)
- Cameron Richardson, actress, Open Water 2: Adrift (b. 1979)
- Ross Scott, YouTuber (b. 1982)
- Percy Sledge, singer, "When a Man Loves a Woman"
- Steven Soderbergh, director
- Pruitt Taylor Vince, actor (b. 1960)
- Rosalie "Lady Tamborine" Washington, gospel musician and tambourine player (b. 1957)
- Tabby Thomas, blues musician and club owner (d. 2014)
- Robert Tinney, Contemporary illustrator
- Webbie, rap artist (b. 1985)
- Shane West, actor (b. 1978)
- Lynn Whitfield, actress
- YoungBoy Never Broke Again, rap artist

== Politicians ==
- Larry S. Bankston, lawyer and former state senator, son of Jesse Bankston, D (b. 1951)
- Regina Barrow (b. 1966), member of the Louisiana State Senate, former state representative for East and West Baton Rouge parishes, 2005–2016
- V.J. Bella (b. 1927), former state representative from St. Mary Parish and state fire marshal, based in Baton Rouge, 1990–1992 and 1996–2004, R
- Sherman A. Bernard (1925–2012), state insurance commissioner, 1972–1988; convicted felon, D
- Morton Blackwell (b. 1939), political activist in Louisiana and later Virginia, R
- Mike Branch (b. 1968), state senator and commercial pilot, later of Las Vegas, Nevada, R
- Overton Brooks (1897–1961), U.S. representative, 1937–1961, representing Louisiana's 4th congressional district based about Shreveport, born in Baton Rouge, D
- Chad M. Brown, member of the Louisiana House of Representatives for Iberville and Assumption parishes, effective January 2016, lives in Plaquemine, former Baton Rouge resident
- H. Rap Brown, African American activist imprisoned in Georgia
- George A. Caldwell, contractor who supervised the construction of twenty-six public buildings in Louisiana; imprisoned in the "Louisiana Hayride" scandals of 1939–1940, D
- Barbara West Carpenter (b. 1943), dean of international relations at Southern University and African-American Democrat state representative from District 63 in East Baton Rouge Parish since 2016
- Bill Cassidy (b. 1957), U.S. senator; U.S. congressman; state senator
- Sally Clausen (b. 1945), former university president and commissioner of Louisiana higher education, retired in Baton Rouge
- Thomas G. Clausen (1939–2002), last person to be elected to the since appointed position of Louisiana education superintendent; St. Mary Parish native and Baton Rouge resident
- Michael Cloud (b. 1975), U.S. representative for Texas
- Luther F. Cole (1925–2013), legislator, judge, state Supreme Court associate justice, D
- Paula Davis (b. 1973), state representative for District 69 in East Baton Rouge Parish since 2015
- William J. "Bill" Dodd (1909–1991), state representative, lieutenant governor, state auditor, member of Louisiana Board of Education, state education superintendent, D
- Gil Dozier, Louisiana agriculture commissioner, 1976–1980; convicted felon, D
- Rick Edmonds, state representative for District 66 in East Baton Rouge Parish since 2016, R
- Mike Edmonson, superintendent of the Louisiana State Police since 2008, R
- Ronnie Edwards (c. 1952–2016), member of the Baton Rouge Metro Council and the Louisiana House of Representatives in January and February 2016, D
- Jimmy Field, Louisiana Public Service Commissioner (1996–2012), R
- Cleo Fields, U.S. representative for Louisiana
- Jeff Fortenberry, U.S. representative from Nebraska (b. 1960), R
- Mike Futrell, former state representative and Metro Council member, R
- Garret Graves (b. 1972), U.S. representative from Louisiana
- William H. Gray (1941–2013), U.S. representative from Philadelphia, Pennsylvania, born in Baton Rouge, first African American to serve as a House majority whip, D
- Douglas D. "Doug" Green (b. c. 1950), state insurance commissioner, 1988–1991; convicted felon, D
- Anthony Guarisco Jr. (b. 1938), former state senator from Morgan City; lawyer, formerly practiced in Baton Rouge, D
- Dudley A. Guglielmo (1909–2005), Louisiana insurance commissioner 1964–1972, D
- Betty Heitman, co-chairwoman of the Republican National Committee, 1983–1987; resided in and died in 1994 in Baton Rouge, R
- Kip Holden, mayor-president of East Baton Rouge Parish (b. 1952), D
- Barry Ivey (b. 1979), businessman and current member of the Louisiana House from District 65 (b. 1979), R
- Louis E. "Woody" Jenkins (b. 1947), former Louisiana state representative and three-time U.S. Senate candidate, D-turned-R
- Bobby Jindal (b. 1971), governor and Louisiana congressman, R
- Johnnie Jones (1920–2022), member of the Louisiana House, 1972–1976
- Edmond Jordan (b. 1971), member of the Louisiana House since 2016 for District 29 in West and East Baton Rouge parishes
- Edith Killgore Kirkpatrick (1918–2014), former member of Louisiana Board of Regents, D
- Jeannette Knoll (b. 1943), associate justice of the Louisiana Supreme Court; born in Baton Rouge, resident of Marksville, D
- Fred S. LeBlanc, mayor of Baton Rouge (1941–1944), state attorney general (1944–1948; 1952–1956), D
- Coleman Lindsey (1892–1968), state senator, lieutenant governor, state district court judge, D
- John Maginnis (1948–2014), Louisiana political journalist, author, and commentator; reared and resided in Baton Rouge
- Robert M. Marionneaux (b. 1968), attorney and state senator, D
- Sidney McCrory (1911–1985), entomologist who served as state agriculture commissioner, 1956–1960, D
- Eugene McGehee (1928–2014), member of the Louisiana House of Representatives, 1960–1972; state district court judge in East Baton Rouge Parish, 1972–1978, D
- Nolan Mettetal (1945–2020), Mississippi state representative
- Henson Moore, U.S. representative from Sixth Congressional District, 1975–1987, R
- W. Spencer Myrick, state legislator from West Carroll Parish, later resided in Baton Rouge, D
- Jewel J. Newman (1921–2014), member of the Louisiana House of Representatives
- Bob Odom (1935–2014), state agriculture commissioner, 1980–2008, D
- Kenneth Osterberger (1930–2016), member of the Louisiana State Senate from East Baton Rouge Parish, 1972–1992; defeated David Duke in 1975, D-turned-R
- Jessel Ourso, colorful, controversial sheriff of Iberville Parish, began his career in law enforcement in the middle 1950s as a Baton Rouge municipal police officer, D
- John Victor Parker (1928–2014), judge of the United States District Court for the Middle District of Louisiana, 1979–2014
- Edward Grady Partin (1924–1990), Teamsters Union figure, D
- Tony Perkins (b. 1963), former state representative and president of the Family Research Council, R
- Ralph Perlman, Louisiana state budget director, 1967–1988
- Melvin Rambin, mayor of Monroe, 2000–2001; former banker in Baton Rouge, interred at Roselawn Memorial Park in Baton Rouge, R
- Buddy Roemer, former governor and Baton Rouge businessman (b. 1943), I
- Frank P. Simoneaux, member of the Louisiana House of Representatives for East Baton Rouge Parish, 1972–1982; lawyer in Baton Rouge, D
- Patricia Haynes Smith, state representative for District 67 in East Baton Rouge Parish since 2008
- Mason Spencer, state representative from Madison Parish, 1924–1936, born in Baton Rouge in 1892, D
- Raymond Strother, political consultant, lived in Baton Rouge, 1960–1980, D
- Zachary Taylor, military leader and the twelfth President of the United States(1784–1850), W
- David Treen, former Louisiana governor (1928–2009), born in Baton Rouge, R
- Lillian W. Walker, former state representative (1964–1972), D
- Gus Weill, public relations consultant, author, television host, D
- John C. White, Louisiana education superintendent since 2012, I
- Mack A. "Bodi" White Jr., state representative since 2004, R
- J. Robert Wooley, insurance commissioner, 2000–2006; attorney with Adams & Reese in Baton Rouge, D

== Military commanders ==
- Robert H. Barrow, 27th commandant of the Marine Corps, 1979–1983 (1922–2008)
- Paris Davis, U.S. Army special forces colonel and recipient of the Medal of Honor in the Vietnam War
- Stephen O. Fuqua, major general who served as U.S. Army Chief of Infantry
- Russel Honoré, general, U.S. Army, known for Hurricane Katrina relief
- John A. Lejeune, 13th commandant of the Marine Corps, 1920–1929 (1867–1942)
- Junius Wallace Jones, major general, U.S. Air Force, first inspector-general of the Air Force (1890–1977)
- Homer L. Wise, Medal of Honor recipient during World War II

== Intellectuals ==
- Louis Berry (1914–1998), civil rights attorney and dean of Southern University Law Center, 1972–1974
- David French Boyd (1834–1899), former president and professor at LSU
- Treva Brown, chemist and STEM advocate
- John R. Conniff, New Orleans and Baton Rouge educator who served as president of Louisiana Tech University, 1926–1928
- Edwin Adams Davis, Louisiana historian
- Alma Dawson, scholar of librarianship. Russell B. Long Professor, School of Library & Information Science, Louisiana State University
- Mike Dunne (1949–2007), environmental reporter for the Morning Advocate
- John Guckenheimer, mathematician, Cornell University
- Kaylee Hartung, CBS News correspondent (b. 1985)
- George Hilton Jones III (1924–2008), Rhodes scholar, author, historian, and professor of history
- Stephan Kinsella, intellectual property lawyer and libertarian legal theorist (b. 1965)
- Charles H. Loeb, journalist
- John L. Loos, historian
- Mary Elizabeth Moore, Methodist theologian, author, and Boston University School of Theology dean
- Arthur T. Prescott (1863–1942), LSU administrator, founding president of Louisiana Tech University
- Jesse N. Stone (1924–2001), president of the Southern University System, 1974–1985; civil rights attorney
- William Y. Thompson, historian
- Eric Voegelin (1901–1985), political theorist and professor at LSU
- Stephen Webre, historian
- Eugene Wigner, Nobel Prize-winning physicist and emeritus professor at Louisiana State University
- Mary Bushnell Williams (1826-1891), author, poet, translator
- T. Harry Williams, Pulitzer Prize-winning author and professor at LSU

== Criminals ==
- Larry S. Bankston (b. 1951), racketeer
- Sean Vincent Gillis (b. 1962), serial killer
- John Allen Muhammad (1960–2009), serial killer and one of the two D.C. Snipers
- Edward Partin, Teamsters union official turned government informant
- Gary Plauché (1945–2014), vigilante murderer
- Barry Seal (1939–1986), drug trafficker for the Medellín Cartel

== Other ==
- Julie Cantrell (b. 1973), bestselling novelist and editor
- Isiah Carey (b. 1970), radio and television broadcast journalist and reporter, known for the "Reporter Goes Ghetto" YouTube video
- Ralph Eggleston, animator at Pixar and director of the Academy Award-winning short film For the Birds
- Yaser Esam Hamdi (b. 1980), captured while fighting in Afghanistan with the Taliban in 2001; known for the Supreme Court case Hamdi v. Rumsfeld
- Todd Graves, entrepreneur and founder of Raising Cane's Chicken Fingers
- Don Lemon, news anchor and journalist
- Ryan Williams, entrepreneur and founder of Cadre
- Barry Seal, Medellín Cartel drug trafficker
- Jimmy Swaggart (b. 1935), Pentecostal televangelist, singer, pianist, pastor, author, and head of his eponymous named Bible college
- Matt Tullos (b. 1963), writer and minister
- Rani Whitfield, physician, broadcaster and author
