= 2027 Baseball Hall of Fame balloting =

Elections to the Baseball Hall of Fame

National Baseball

Hall of Fame and Museum
- Induction date: July 25, 2027 (scheduled)

Elections to the Baseball Hall of Fame for 2027 will be conducted according to the rules most recently amended in 2022. As in the past, the Baseball Writers' Association of America (BBWAA) will vote by mail to select from a ballot of recently retired players. The results will be announced in January. The Contemporary Baseball Era Committee will meet on December 6, 2026 at baseball's winter meetings to vote on a ballot of managers, executives or umpires who have made their greatest impact on the game since 1980, with the results to be announced that evening.

== BBWAA ballot ==
The list of players appearing on the BBWAA ballot was released on November 16, 2026. There were 13 players carried over from the 2025 ballot, who garnered at least 5% of the vote and are still eligible for election, as well as 14 players whose last major league appearance was in 2021, played at least 10 seasons in Major League Baseball, and were chosen by a screening committee. This will be the final ballot for Omar Vizquel.

Hall of Fame voting results for class of 2027
Player	Votes	Percent	Change	Year
Chase Utley				4th
Andy Pettitte				9th
Félix Hernández				3rd
Alex Rodriguez				6th
Bobby Abreu				8th
Jimmy Rollins				6th
Cole Hamels				2nd
Dustin Pedroia				3rd
Mark Buehrle				7th
Omar Vizquel				10th
David Wright				4th
Francisco Rodríguez				5th
Torii Hunter				7th
Jake Arrieta†			–	1st
Jay Bruce†			–	1st
Asdrúbal Cabrera†			–	1st
Starlin Castro†			–	1st
Wade Davis†			–	1st
Brett Gardner†			–	1st
Jon Lester†			–	1st
Andrew Miller†			–	1st
Buster Posey†			–	1st
Pablo Sandoval†			–	1st
Ervin Santana†			–	1st
Kyle Seager†			–	1st
Joakim Soria†			–	1st
Ryan Zimmerman†			–	1st

Key
	Elected to the Hall of Fame on this ballot (named in **bold italics**).
	Elected subsequently, as of 2026 (named in plain italics).
	Renominated for the 2028 BBWAA election by adequate performance on this ballot and has not subsequently been eliminated.
	Eliminated from annual BBWAA consideration by poor performance or expiration on subsequent ballots.
	Eliminated from annual BBWAA consideration by poor performance or expiration on this ballot.
†	First time on the BBWAA ballot.
*	Eliminated from annual BBWAA consideration by poor performance on this ballot (not expiration).

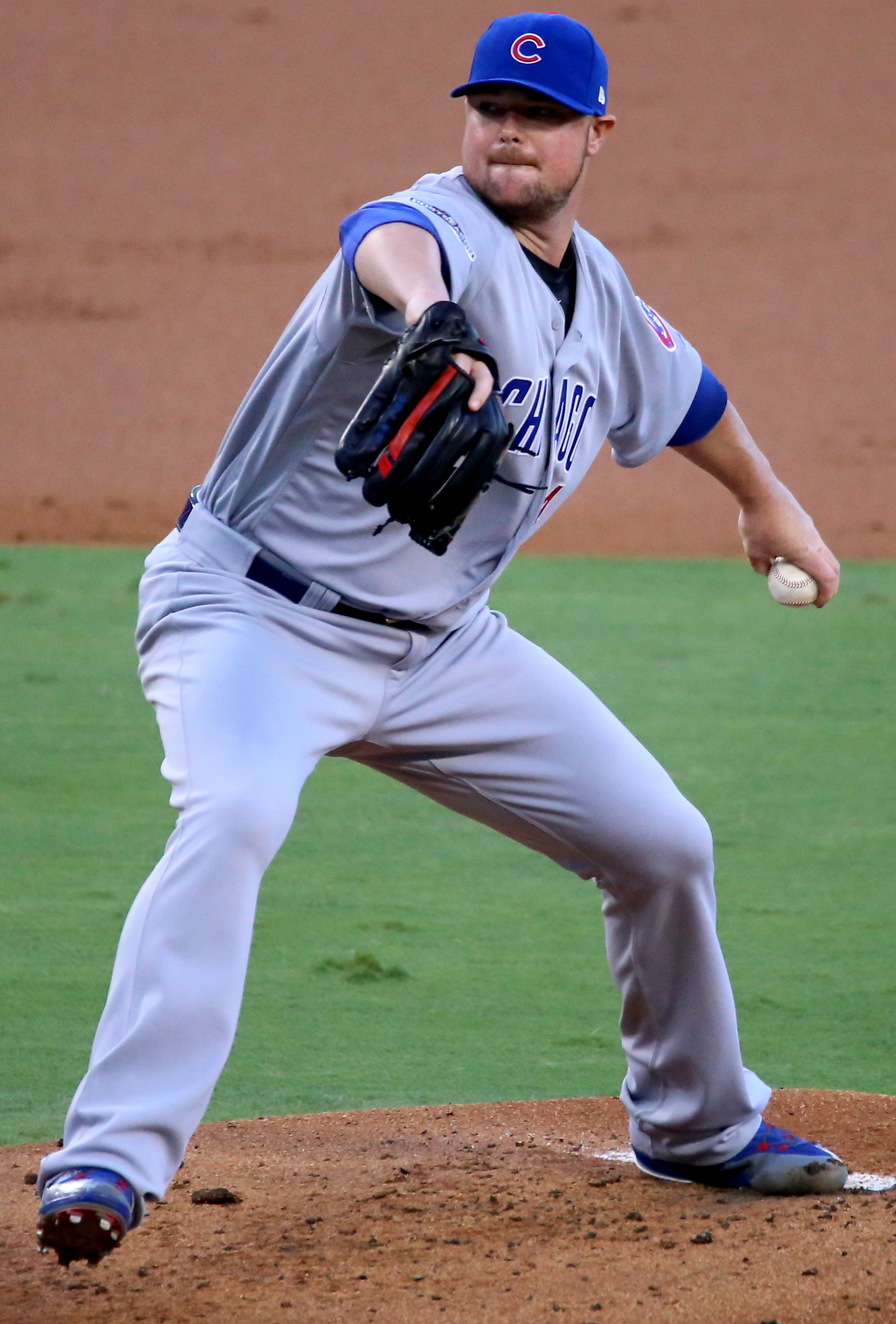
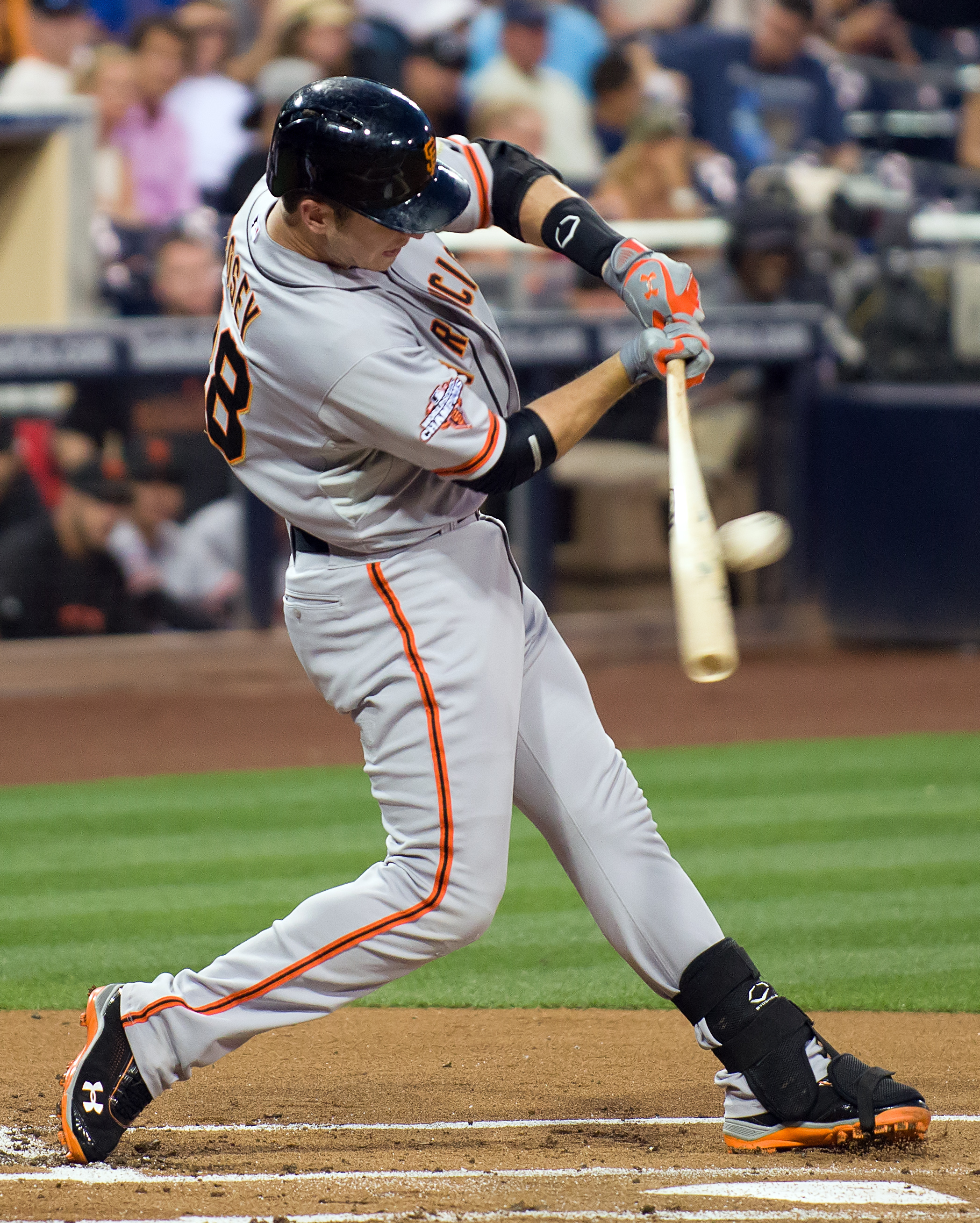
Jon Lester (left) and Buster Posey made their debut on the ballot this year

Players who met first-year eligibility requirements but were not selected by the screening committee for inclusion on the ballot were: Matt Adams, Brett Anderson, Alex Avila, Luis Avilán, John Axford, Trevor Bauer, Dellin Betances, Brad Brach, Drew Butera, Trevor Cahill, Tyler Chatwood, Danny Duffy, Jarrod Dyson, Adam Eaton, Neftalí Feliz, Mike Fiers, Dexter Fowler, Todd Frazier, Freddy Galvis, Javy Guerra, J. A. Happ, Will Harris, Bryan Holaday, Derek Holland, Brock Holt, Jon Jay, Nate Jones, Matt Joyce, Scott Kazmir, Brandon Kintzler, Ryan Lavarnway, Wade LeBlanc, José Lobatón, Jonathan Lucroy, Jeff Mathis, Cameron Maybin, Jordy Mercer, Mitch Moreland, Gerardo Parra, Brad Peacock, Hernán Pérez, Yusmeiro Petit, Wilson Ramos, Josh Reddick, René Rivera, Andrew Romine, Héctor Santiago, Eric Sogard, Pedro Strop, Anthony Swarzak, Josh Tomlin, Nick Vincent, Tony Watson, and Jordan Zimmermann.

== Contemporary Baseball Era Committee ==
The Contemporary Baseball Era Committee will meet on December 6, 2026 at baseball's winter meetings to consider the election of managers, executives or umpires who have made their greatest impact on the game since 1980; this is the first election for non-players since voting for 2024 inductees. Any candidate not receiving at least five votes will be ineligible for consideration in the committee's next ballot, and any candidate who does not receive at least five votes in multiple ballots will be permanently ineligible for all of the committee's future ballots.

Candidate	Role	Votes	Percent
Sandy Alderson	Executive		
Dusty Baker	Manager		
Bruce Bochy	Manager		
Joe Maddon	Manager		
Lou Piniella	Manager		
Brian Sabean	Executive		
Ted Turner	Executive		
Bill White	Executive		

Key
Elected to the Hall of Fame on this ballot (named in **bold italics**).
Elected subsequently, as of 2026 (named in plain italics).
Ineligible for the 2030 Veterans Committee election by poor performance on this ballot and has not subsequently been eliminated.
Eliminated from triennial Veterans Committee consideration by poor performance on subsequent ballots.
Eliminated from triennial Veterans Committee consideration by poor performance on this ballot.
