= Thomas Clausen (educator) =

American educator

Thomas Greenwood Clausen
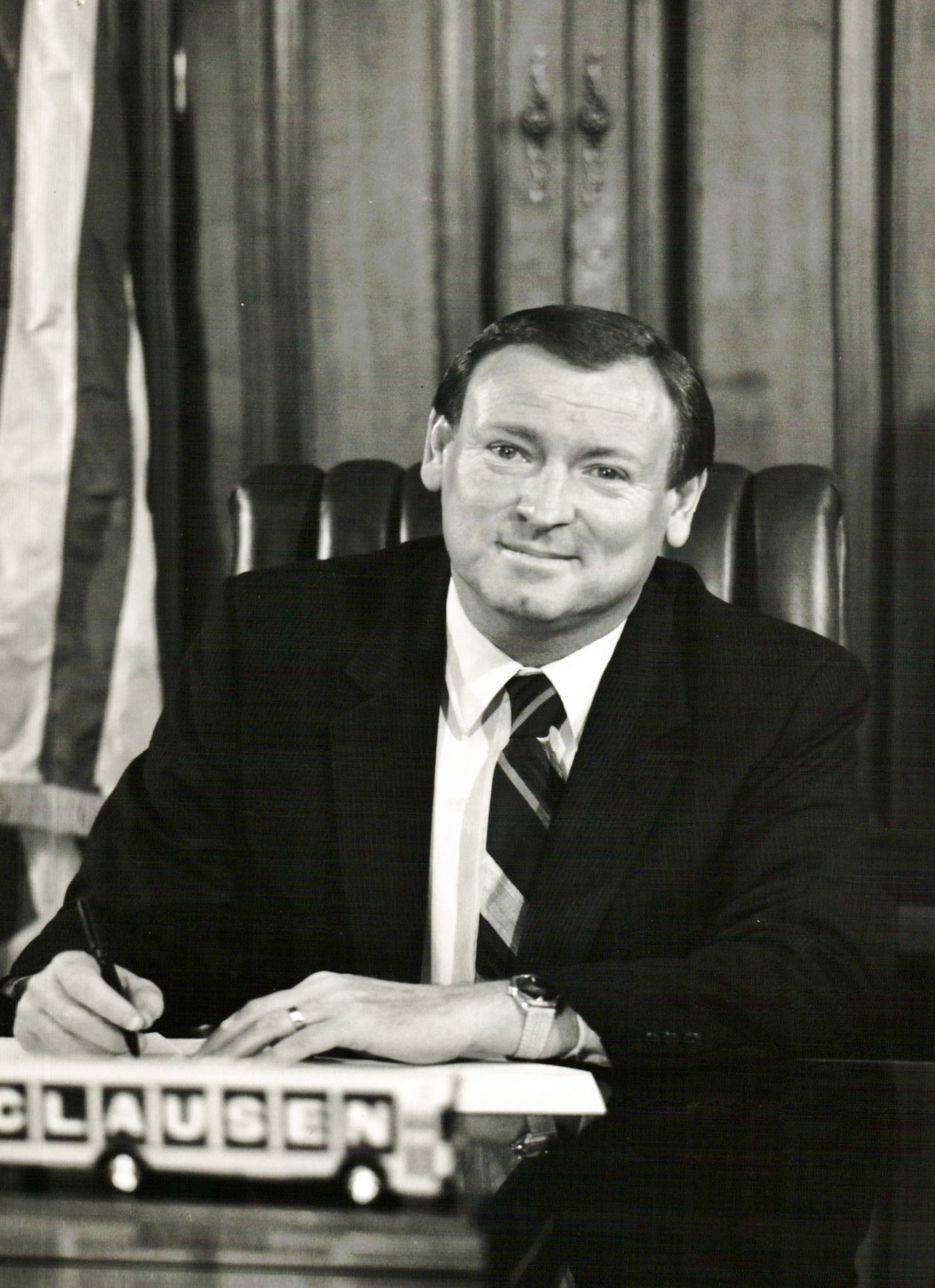

Louisiana State Superintendent of Education
- In office 1984–1988
- Preceded by: J. Kelly Nix
- Succeeded by: Wilmer St. Clair Cody, Jr.

Personal details
- Born: December 22, 1939 Verdunville, Louisiana, US
- Died: February 20, 2002 (aged 62) Baton Rouge, Louisiana, US
- Party: Democratic
- Spouse: Gale Bell Clausen (married c. 1972)
- Relations: Sally Clausen (sister)
- Children: 2
- Education: University of Louisiana at Lafayette Louisiana State University University of Southern Mississippi
- Occupation: Educator

Military service
- Branch/service: United States Army

Thomas Greenwood Clausen (December 22, 1939 – February 20, 2002) was an educator from Baton Rouge, Louisiana, who was the last elected state superintendent of education, a position which he filled as a Democrat from 1984 to 1988 during the third administration of Governor Edwin Edwards.

== Background ==
Clausen's mother, Leonell Wilkes Clausen, who died in 1999 was a native of Centerville in St. Mary Parish. She lived in Verdunville, also in St. Mary Parish, where Clausen was born, but she spent her later years in Baton Rouge. "Mama Nell" Clausen, as she was known, drove a school bus, delivered food to shut-ins, worked in a school for the handicapped, and was a justice of the peace in St. Mary Parish. Clausen's sister, Sally Clausen, is a retired educational administrator who was from 1995 to 2001 the president of Southeastern Louisiana University in Hammond and from 2008 to 2010 the Louisiana commissioner of higher education under the supervision of the Louisiana Board of Regents. Clausen's stepbrother, Kenneth Gray, was originally a foster child reared by their mother. Clausen was married for twenty-nine years to the former Gale Bell, later Gale Anderson, the wife of Jim Anderson. The Clausens had two sons, Kyle Thomas Clausen and Kouri Lorin Clausen.

Clausen graduated from Centerville High School in St. Mary Parish. He received his bachelor's, master's, and Ph.D. degrees, respectively, from the University of Louisiana at Lafayette, Louisiana State University in Baton Rouge, and the University of Southern Mississippi in Hattiesburg, Mississippi. Clausen served in the United States Army from 1960 to 1961.

== Educational career ==
Clausen taught in public school for five years and was from 1967 to 1972 an assistant professor at Nicholls State University in Thibodaux in Lafourche Parish, Louisiana. From 1972 to 1976, Clausen was an assistant superintendent, with duties in special education, under superintendent Louis J. Michot.

Clausen first ran for superintendent in the 1979 nonpartisan blanket primary but lost in the general election to the Democratic incumbent J. Kelly Nix, a native of West Carroll Parish in northeastern Louisiana. Clausen used a picture of a school bus on his campaign posters. He promised when elected to reform the educational system and vowed not to place blame unduly on classroom teachers. Hed stressed a "common-sense" approach to education, with emphasis on basic knowledge, classroom discipline, vocational programs, and teacher training.

In the primary election held on October 22, 1983, Clausen handily unseated former opponent Nix in a two-candidate field. The Louisiana Secretary of State's office does not give the statewide results of this race on its website, but the outcome is provided in the returns for the individual parishes, most of which supported Clausen. In this same election, Edwin Edwards won his third nonconsecutive term as governor by handily unseating the Republican incumbent David C. Treen. Superintendent Clausen worked to implement more rigorous graduation requirements and expanded the elective subjects offered to include computer literacy, the arts, and foreign languages. He advocated for the expansion of professional opportunities for educators. He coordinated the movement of the education department into the Louisiana Civil Service system. Clausen worked to enhance the process of school accreditation. He also provided the transition to an appointed superintendency beginning in 1988 under the administration of Edward's second successor, Governor Buddy Roemer.

Clausen was a member of the Louisiana Board of Commerce and Industry during the administration of Republican governor Murphy J. "Mike" Foster, Jr., like Clausen a native of St. Mary Parish. For the last two years of his life, Clausen was a special education teacher at Valley Park Alternative School in Baton Rouge. Upon his death of cancer in Baton Rouge at the age of sixty-two, the Louisiana State Senate read a concurrent resolution in his honor.

Eleven scholarships in the amount of $500 each were issued in 2004 in Clausen's name by the University of Louisiana System.

Preceded by J. Kelly Nix	Louisiana State Superintendent of Education; 1984–1988	Succeeded by First appointed superintendent
