= 2024 Baseball Hall of Fame balloting =

Elections to the Baseball Hall of Fame

National Baseball

Hall of Fame and Museum
- New inductees: 4
- via BBWAA: 3
- via Contemporary Baseball Era Committee: 1
- Total inductees: 346
- Induction date: July 21, 2024

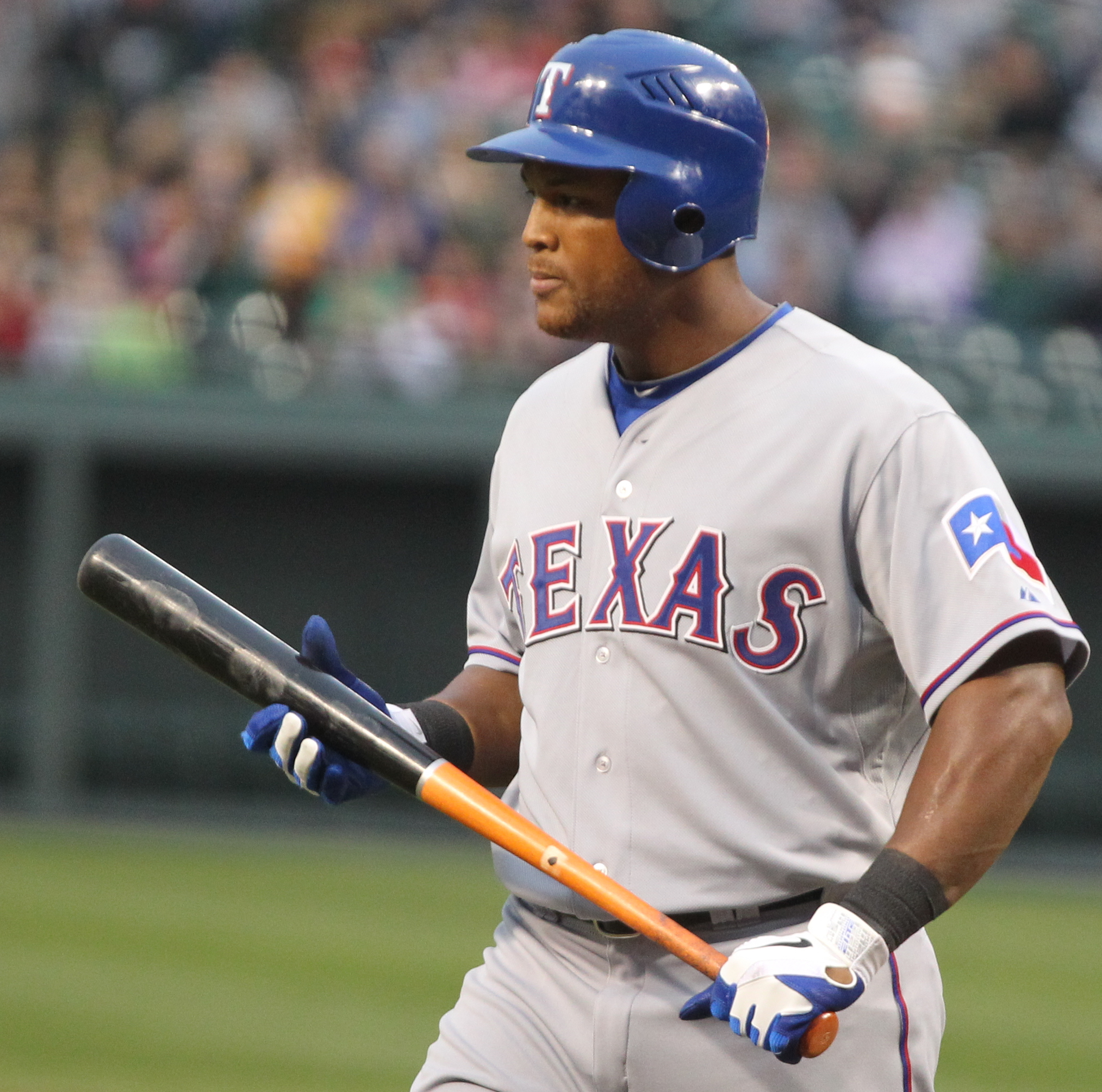
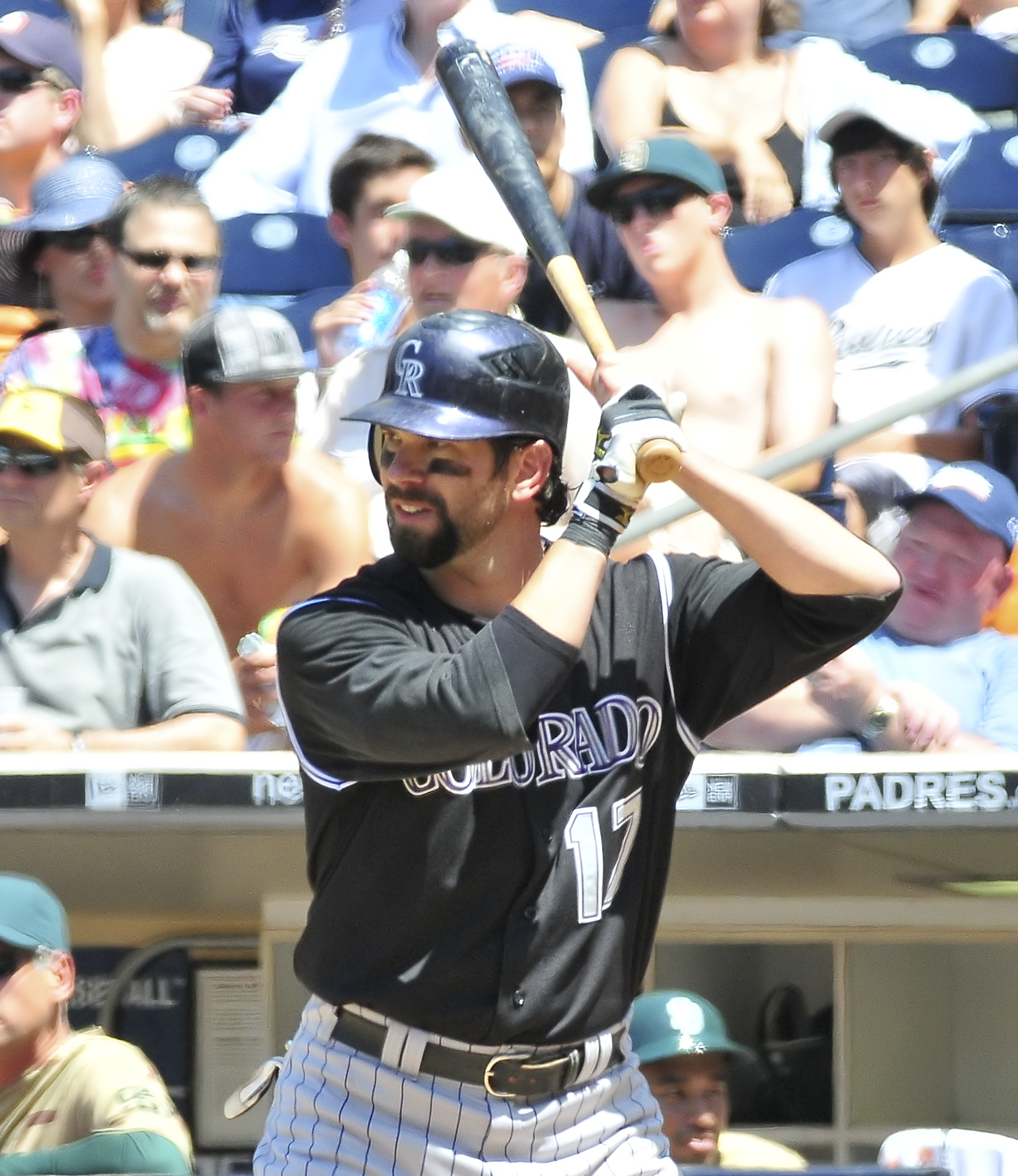
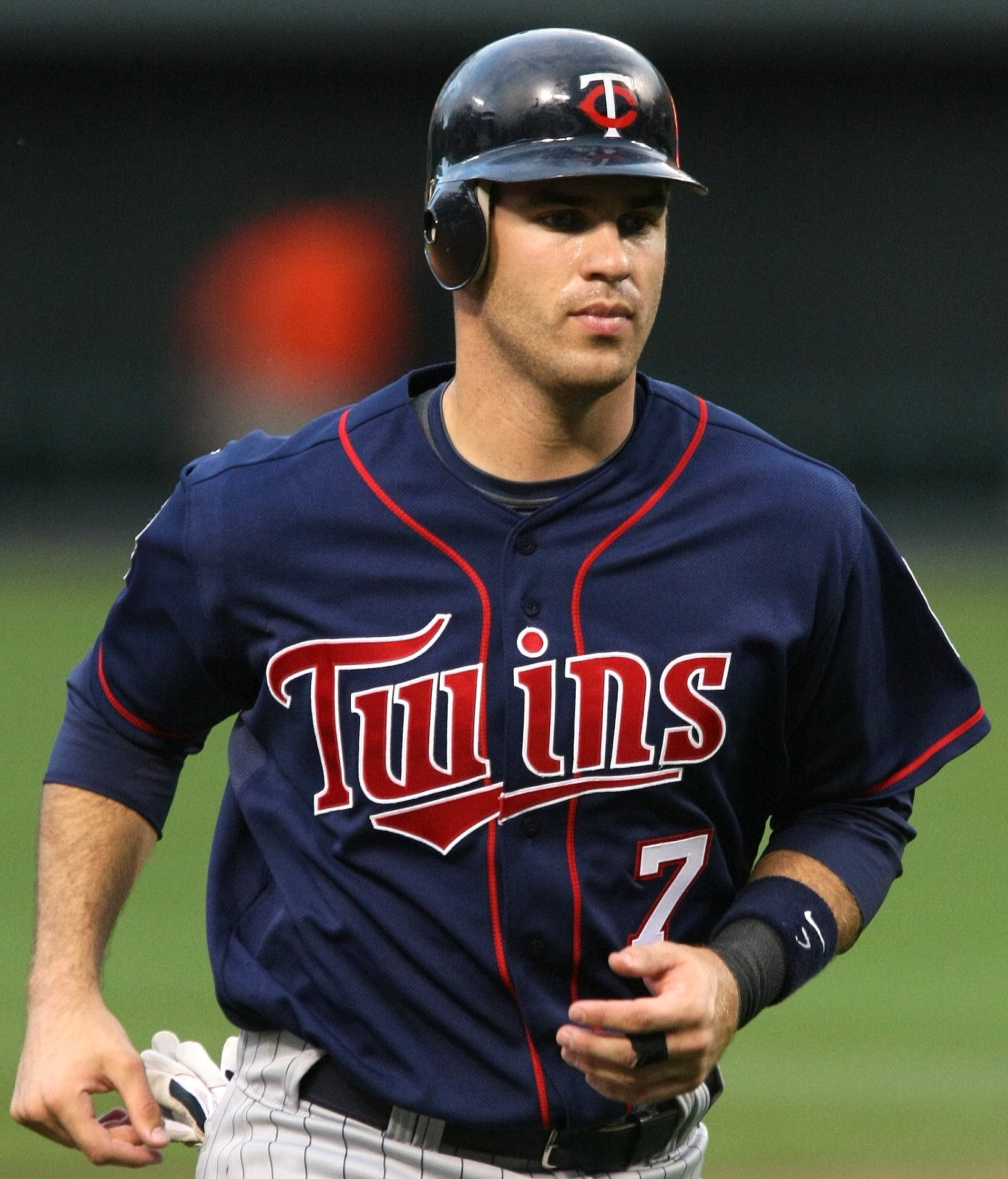
2024 BBWAA inductees (L-R): Adrián Beltré, Todd Helton, and Joe Mauer

Elections to the Baseball Hall of Fame for 2024 were conducted according to the rules most recently amended in 2022. As in the past, the Baseball Writers' Association of America (BBWAA) voted by mail to select from a ballot of recently retired players, with the results announced on January 23.

Three candidates were inducted by BBWAA: Adrián Beltré, Todd Helton, and Joe Mauer. Beltré and Mauer were inducted in their first year of eligibility; Helton was in his sixth year of eligibility.

The Contemporary Baseball Era Committee met on December 3, 2023 at the Winter Meetings to consider the election of eight managers, executives or umpires who made their greatest impact on the game since 1980. Manager Jim Leyland was elected by the committee.

Inductees were honored in a ceremony at the Clark Sports Center on Sunday, July 21, 2024.

== BBWAA election ==
The list of players appearing on the BBWAA ballot was released on November 20, 2023. There were 14 players carried over from the 2023 ballot, who garnered at least 5% of the vote and were still eligible for election, as well as 12 players whose last major league appearance was in 2018, played at least 10 seasons of Major League Baseball, and were chosen by a screening committee. This was the final ballot for Gary Sheffield. A total of 385 ballots were cast, with 289 votes needed to reach the 75% threshold for election. A total of 2,696 votes were cast for individual players, an average of 7 votes per ballot.

Hall of Fame voting results for class of 2024
Player	Votes	Percent	Change	Year
**Adrián Beltré**†	366	95.1%	–	1st
**Todd Helton**	307	79.7%	▲7.5%	6th
**Joe Mauer**†	293	76.1%	–	1st
Billy Wagner	284	73.8%	▲5.7%	9th
Gary Sheffield	246	63.9%	▲8.9%	10th
Andruw Jones	237	61.6%	▲3.5%	7th
Carlos Beltrán	220	57.1%	▲10.6%	2nd
Alex Rodriguez	134	34.8%	▼0.9%	3rd
Manny Ramirez	125	32.5%	▼0.7%	8th
Chase Utley†	111	28.8%	–	1st
Omar Vizquel	68	17.7%	▼1.8%	7th
Bobby Abreu	57	14.8%	▼0.6%	5th
Jimmy Rollins	57	14.8%	▲1.9%	3rd
Andy Pettitte	52	13.5%	▼3.5%	6th
Mark Buehrle	32	8.3%	▼2.5%	4th
Francisco Rodríguez	30	7.8%	▼2.0%	2nd
Torii Hunter	28	7.3%	▲0.4%	4th
David Wright†	24	6.2%	–	1st
José Bautista†*	6	1.6%	–	1st
Víctor Martínez†*	6	1.6%	–	1st
Bartolo Colón†*	5	1.3%	–	1st
Matt Holliday†*	4	1.0%	–	1st
Adrián González†*	3	0.8%	–	1st
Brandon Phillips†*	1	0.3%	–	1st
José Reyes†*	0	0.0%	–	1st
James Shields†*	0	0.0%	–	1st

Key
	Elected to the Hall of Fame on this ballot (named in **bold italics**).
	Elected subsequently, as of 2026 (named in plain italics).
	Renominated for the 2025 BBWAA election by adequate performance on this ballot and has not subsequently been eliminated.
	Eliminated from annual BBWAA consideration by poor performance or expiration on subsequent ballots.
	Eliminated from annual BBWAA consideration by poor performance or expiration on this ballot.
†	First time on the BBWAA ballot.
*	Eliminated from annual BBWAA consideration by poor performance on this ballot (not expiration).

Players who met first-year eligibility requirements but were not selected by the screening committee for inclusion on the ballot were: Matt Belisle, Gregor Blanco, Blaine Boyer, Santiago Casilla, Brett Cecil, Jorge de la Rosa, Brian Duensing, A. J. Ellis, Doug Fister, Yovani Gallardo, Jaime García, Craig Gentry, Chris Gimenez, Jason Hammel, Chase Headley, Phil Hughes, Kevin Jepsen, Jim Johnson, Boone Logan, Ryan Madson, Brandon McCarthy, Miguel Montero, Brandon Morrow, Peter Moylan, Bud Norris, Cliff Pennington, Colby Rasmus, Adam Rosales, Marc Rzepczynski, Jarrod Saltalamacchia, Denard Span, Chris Stewart, Chris Tillman, Chris Young, Eric Young Jr. and Brad Ziegler.

== Contemporary Baseball Era Committee ==
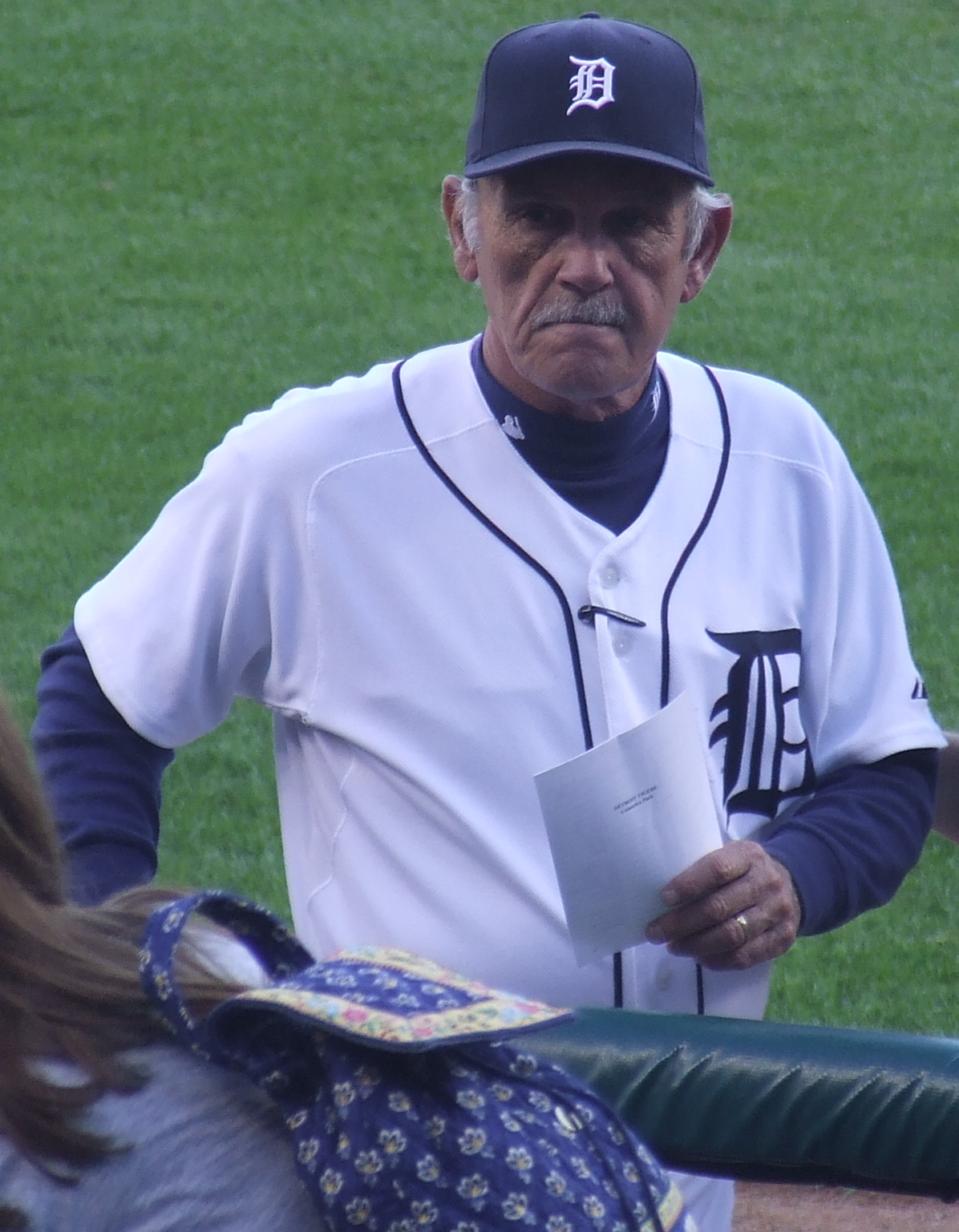
2024 Era Committee inductee Jim Leyland

The Contemporary Baseball Era Committee met on December 3 at the Winter Meetings to consider the election of eight managers, executives or umpires who have made their greatest impact on the game since 1980. The final ballot was announced on October 19, 2023.

The committee elected Jim Leyland.

Candidate	Role	Votes	Percent
**Jim Leyland**	Manager	15	93.75%
Lou Piniella	Manager	11	68.75%
Bill White	Executive	10	62.5%
Cito Gaston	Manager	<5	
Davey Johnson	Manager	<5	
Ed Montague	Umpire	<5	
Hank Peters	Executive	<5	
Joe West	Umpire	<5	

Key
Elected to the Hall of Fame on this ballot (named in **bold italics**).
Elected subsequently, as of 2026 (named in plain italics).
Ineligible for the 2027 Veterans Committee election by poor performance on this ballot and has not subsequently been eliminated.
Eliminated from triennial Veterans Committee consideration by poor performance on subsequent ballots.
Eliminated from triennial Veterans Committee consideration by poor performance on this ballot.

The eight Contemporary Baseball Era manager/executive/umpire finalists were selected by the BBWAA-appointed Historical Overview Committee from all eligible candidates whose most significant career impact was realized since 1980. Eligible candidates include managers and umpires with 10 or more major league seasons and retired for at least five years (candidates who are 65 years or older are eligible six months following retirement); and executives retired for at least five years (active executives 70 years or older are eligible for consideration regardless of the position they hold in an organization and regardless of whether their body of work has been completed). All candidates must not be on Baseball’s Ineligible List.

The committee consisted of the following individuals:

- Hall of Famers: Jeff Bagwell, Tom Glavine, Chipper Jones, Ted Simmons, Jim Thome, Joe Torre
- Executives: Bud Selig, Sandy Alderson, William DeWitt Jr., Michael Hill, Ken Kendrick, Andy MacPhail, Phyllis Merhige
- Media and historians: Sean Forman, Jack O'Connell, Jesus Ortiz

The Contemporary Baseball Era managers/executives/umpires ballot was determined this fall by the Historical Overview Committee, composed of 11 veteran historians: Adrian Burgos (University of Illinois); Bob Elliott (Canadian Baseball Network); Jim Henneman (formerly Baltimore Sun); Steve Hirdt (Stats Perform); David O’Brien (The Athletic); Jack O’Connell (BBWAA); Jim Reeves (formerly Fort Worth Star-Telegram); Tracy Ringolsby (InsideTheSeams.com); Glenn Schwarz (formerly San Francisco Chronicle); Susan Slusser (San Francisco Chronicle); and Mark Whicker (Los Angeles News Group).

== Ford C. Frick Award ==
The Ford C. Frick Award is presented annually to a broadcaster for "major contributions to baseball" and has been presented annually since 1978. The 2024 award will be a composite ballot of local and national voices. The ten nominees for the Frick Award are:

- Joe Buck (born 1969), former Fox Sports broadcaster, former St. Louis Cardinals broadcaster
- Joe Castiglione (born 1947), Boston Red Sox broadcaster
- Gary Cohen (born 1958), New York Mets broadcaster
- Jacques Doucet (born 1940), former Montreal Expos and Toronto Blue Jays broadcaster
- Tom Hamilton (born 1954), Cleveland Guardians broadcaster
- Ernie Johnson Sr. (1924–2011), Atlanta Braves broadcaster, MLB player 1950, 1952–1959
- Ken Korach (born 1952), Oakland Athletics broadcaster, former Chicago White Sox broadcaster
- Mike Krukow (born 1952), San Francisco Giants broadcaster, MLB player 1978–1989
- Duane Kuiper (born 1950), San Francisco Giants broadcaster, former Colorado Rockies broadcaster, MLB player 1974–1985
- Dan Shulman (born 1967), broadcaster for Sportsnet and ESPN, Toronto Blue Jays broadcaster

On December 6, 2023, the Hall of Fame announced that Joe Castiglione won the Frick Award.

== BBWAA Career Excellence Award ==
The BBWAA Career Excellence Award honors a baseball writer (or writers) "for meritorious contributions to baseball writing" and is presented during Hall of Fame Weekend by that year's President of the Baseball Writers' Association of America (BBWAA). The award is voted upon annually by the BBWAA.

On December 5, 2023, the Hall announced Gerry Fraley (1954–2019)—a sportswriter for several publications including The Dallas Morning News and The Sporting News—as the recipient of the 2024 BBWAA Career Excellence Award.
