= Gerry Fraley =

American sportswriter (1954–2019)

- Born: December 25, 1954
- Died: May 25, 2019 (aged 64)
- Education: Carnegie Mellon University
- Occupation: Sportswriter
- Years active: 1979–2019
- Known for: Baseball writing
- Spouse(s): Pam Maples (m. 1992, divorced) Stephanie Brownlee
- Children: 2
- Awards: BBWAA Career Excellence Award (2024)

Albert Gerard Fraley (December 25, 1954 – May 25, 2019) was an American sportswriter.

== Career ==
Fraley was from Clearwater, Florida, and attended Clearwater High School and Carnegie Mellon University. Fraley played college football as a nose tackle for the Carnegie Mellon Tartans while majoring in engineering. He switched his major to journalism during his senior year and quit playing football.

After graduating, Fraley returned to Clearwater and worked for The Clearwater Sun from 1979 to 1981 and The Atlanta Journal-Constitution from 1982 to 1989, where he began to focus on baseball. Fraley worked for The Dallas Morning News from 1989 to 2006, and for The Sporting News from 2007 to 2009, when he went back to The Dallas Morning News.

== Personal life ==
Fraley married Pam Maples on November 29, 1992. They had two sons, twins Sam and Tyson. After Fraley and his wife divorced, Pam moved with the children to California.

In 2017, Fraley was diagnosed with cancer. He died on May 25, 2019 at the age of 64. He was survived by his two sons.

In December 2023, Fraley was named the recipient of the 2024 BBWAA Career Excellence Award.
