= Andy Pettitte =

American baseball player (born 1972)

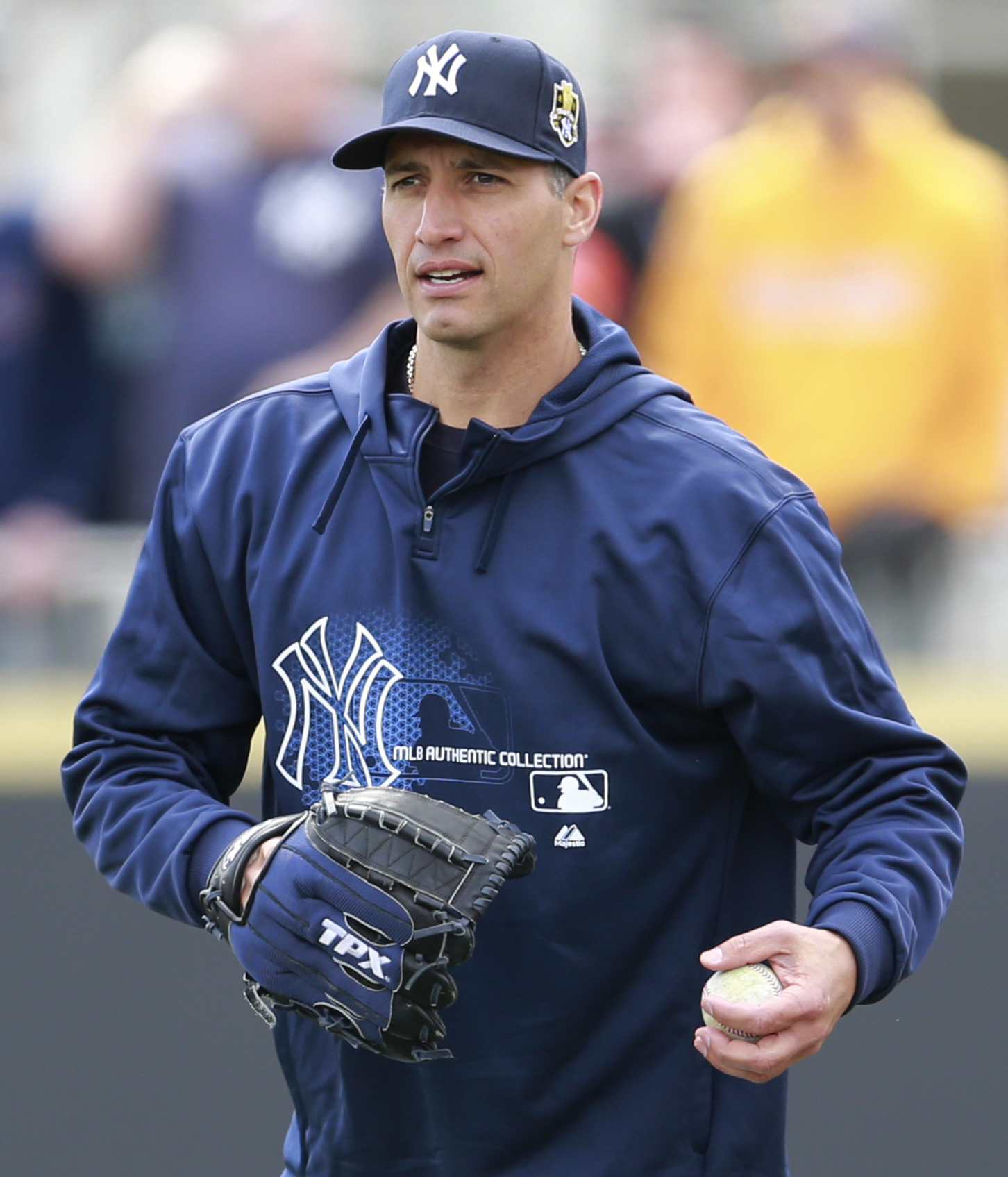
- Pettitte with the New York Yankees in 2013
- Pitcher
- Born: June 15, 1972 (age 54); Baton Rouge, Louisiana, U.S.
- Batted: Left Threw: Left

MLB debut
- April 29, 1995, for the New York Yankees

Last MLB appearance
- September 28, 2013, for the New York Yankees

MLB statistics
- Win–loss record: 256–153
- Earned run average: 3.85
- Strikeouts: 2,448
- Stats at Baseball Reference

Teams
- New York Yankees (1995–2003); Houston Astros (2004–2006); New York Yankees (2007–2010, 2012–2013)

Career highlights and awards
- 3× All-Star (1996, 2001, 2010); 5× World Series champion (1996, 1998–2000, 2009); ALCS MVP (2001); AL wins leader (1996); New York Yankees No. 46 retired; Monument Park honoree

Andrew Eugene Pettitte (/ˈpɛtɪt/; born June 15, 1972) is an American former professional baseball pitcher who played 18 seasons in Major League Baseball (MLB), for the New York Yankees and the Houston Astros. Pettitte won five World Series championships with the Yankees and was a three-time All-Star. He ranks as MLB's all-time postseason wins leader with 19.

Pettitte was drafted by the Yankees organization in 1990, and he signed with them roughly a year later. After debuting in the major leagues in 1995, Pettitte finished third in voting for the American League (AL) Rookie of the Year Award. In 1996, he led the AL with 21 wins and was runner-up for the AL Cy Young Award. Two years later, he was the Yankees' Opening Day starter. Pettitte established himself as one of the "Core Four" players who contributed to the Yankees' late-1990s dynasty that produced four championships. Pettitte won the 2001 AL Championship Series Most Valuable Player (MVP) Award in helping his team win the pennant. After spending nine seasons with the Yankees—a stint in which he won at least 12 games each season—Pettitte signed with the Astros in 2004. He rejoined the Yankees in 2007 and later that season admitted to using human growth hormone to recover from an elbow injury in 2002. Pettitte's second tenure with the team lasted six seasons, interrupted by a one-year retirement in 2011, and also produced a fifth World Series championship in 2009. He retired after the 2013 season.

Pettitte's pitching repertoire included a four-seam and cut fastball and several off-speed pitches such as a slider, curveball, and changeup. A left-handed pitcher, he had an exceptional pickoff move to first base, which allowed him to record 98 career pickoffs. Among Yankees pitchers, Pettitte ranks first in strikeouts (2,020), third in wins (219), and tied for first in games started (438). He won the most games of any pitcher in the 2000s (148). The Yankees retired his uniform number 46 and dedicated a plaque to him in Monument Park in 2015.

== Early life ==
Andrew Eugene Pettitte was born on June 15, 1972, in Baton Rouge, Louisiana. He is of Italian and Cajun descent, and the younger of two children born to Tommy and JoAnn Pettitte. He moved to Texas while in the third grade. Pettitte attended Deer Park High School in Deer Park, Texas, where he pitched for the school's baseball team. His fastball ranged from between 85–87 miles per hour (137–140 km/h). Pettitte also played center and nose guard for the school's football team.

== College career ==
Recruited by San Jacinto College North in Houston, Texas, he opted to play college baseball when coach Wayne Graham compared him to Roger Clemens.

== Professional career ==
=== Draft and minor leagues ===
The Yankees selected Pettitte in the 22nd round, with the 594th overall selection, of the 1990 Major League Baseball draft. As Pettitte enrolled in a junior college rather than a four-year school, the Yankees retained the right to sign him as a draft-and-follow prospect. On May 25, 1991, he signed with the Yankees, receiving an $80,000 signing bonus ($189,103 in current dollar terms), double the Yankees' initial offer. In 1991, Pettitte pitched for the Gulf Coast Yankees of the Rookie-level Gulf Coast League and Oneonta Yankees of the Class A-Short Season New York–Penn League, making six starts for each team. With Oneonta, Pettitte teamed up with catcher Jorge Posada, his longtime batterymate, for the first time. Pettitte threw a knuckleball at the time. Posada struggled to catch the knuckleball, prompting Pettitte to abandon the pitch.

In 1992, Pettitte pitched for the Greensboro Hornets of the Class A South Atlantic League. He pitched to a 10–4 win–loss record and a 2.20 earned run average (ERA), with 130 strikeouts and 55 walks, in 27 games started. That season, Pettitte and Posada first played with Derek Jeter. Pettitte pitched for the Prince William Cannons of the Class A-Advanced Carolina League in the 1993 season, finishing the year with an 11–9 record, a 3.04 ERA, 129 strikeouts, and 47 walks in 26 starts. He also made one start for the Albany-Colonie Yankees of the Class AA Eastern League during the season. Pettitte began the 1994 season with Albany-Colonie, where he had a 7–2 record and 2.71 ERA in 11 starts, before receiving a promotion to the Columbus Clippers of the Class AAA International League. With Columbus, Pettitte had a 7–2 record and a 2.98 ERA in 16 starts. The Yankees named him their minor league pitcher of the year.

=== New York Yankees (1995–2003) ===
Baseball America ranked Pettitte the 49th-best prospect in baseball prior to the 1995 season. In spring training, Pettitte competed for a spot in the starting rotation with Sterling Hitchcock. Hitchcock won the competition, and Pettitte opened the season in the bullpen, making his major league debut with the Yankees on April 29, 1995. The Yankees demoted him back to the minors on May 16 to allow him to continue starting. Eleven days later, he was recalled due to an injury to Jimmy Key. With Scott Kamieniecki and Mélido Pérez also suffering injuries, Pettitte became a member of the starting rotation. He recorded his first major league win on June 7. He continued to perform well through July, leading Yankees' starters in ERA. Pettitte won six of his last seven starts, finishing the season with a 12–9 record and a 4.17 ERA, and placed third in American League (AL) Rookie of the Year Award balloting, behind Marty Cordova and Garret Anderson. He started Game 2 of the 1995 American League Division Series (ALDS) against the Seattle Mariners, allowing four runs in seven innings. The Mariners won the series three games to two.

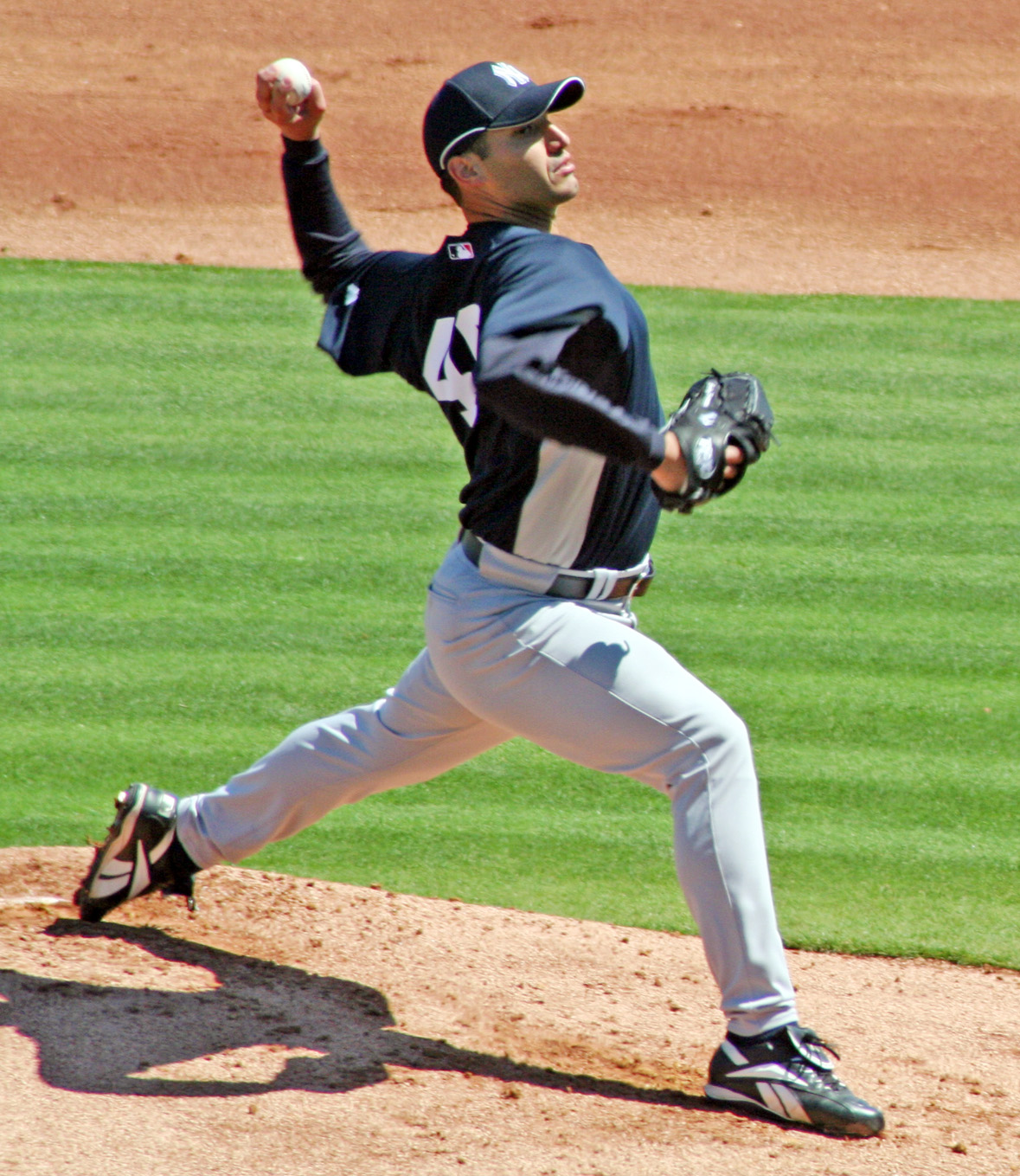
Pettitte pitching at Spring training in 2007

Believing Pettitte to be the superior pitcher, the Yankees traded Hitchcock prior to the 1996 season. Starting the season in the rotation, Pettitte had a 13–4 record at the end of the first half of the season, and made the AL All-Star team. He did not appear in the 1996 MLB All-Star Game, due to a sore arm. He led the AL with 21 wins and finished third in winning percentage (.724), and eighth in ERA (3.87). He finished second to Pat Hentgen for the AL Cy Young Award, with the smallest difference in voting since 1972. Hentgen won the award in part because he pitched more complete games than Pettitte. The Yankees defeated the Texas Rangers in the 1996 ALDS and the Baltimore Orioles in the 1996 American League Championship Series (ALCS). Pettitte won two games against the Orioles, and had his opportunity for a third start in the series cancelled by rain. Pettitte started Game 1 of the 1996 World Series against the Atlanta Braves. He allowed seven runs in 2 1/3 innings in the first game, but outdueled John Smoltz in Game 5, which the Yankees won 1–0. The Yankees defeated the Braves in Game 6 to win the series, four games to two.

In 1997, Pettitte tied for first in games started (35), and also led the league in pickoffs (14), and double plays induced (36). He was third in the league in innings pitched (IP) (240 1/3; a career high), fourth in ERA (2.88), wins (18), and winning percentage (.720), sixth in complete games (4), eighth in strikeouts (166), and tenth in walks per nine innings (2.43). Pettitte finished fifth in the AL Cy Young Award voting. In 1998, he was seventh in the league in complete games (5; a career high), and eighth in wins (16). In the 1998 ALCS, Pettitte allowed four home runs in Game 3 against the Cleveland Indians. The Yankees won the series, and defeated the San Diego Padres in the 1998 World Series. Pettitte started in Game 4, defeating Kevin Brown in the deciding game of the series.

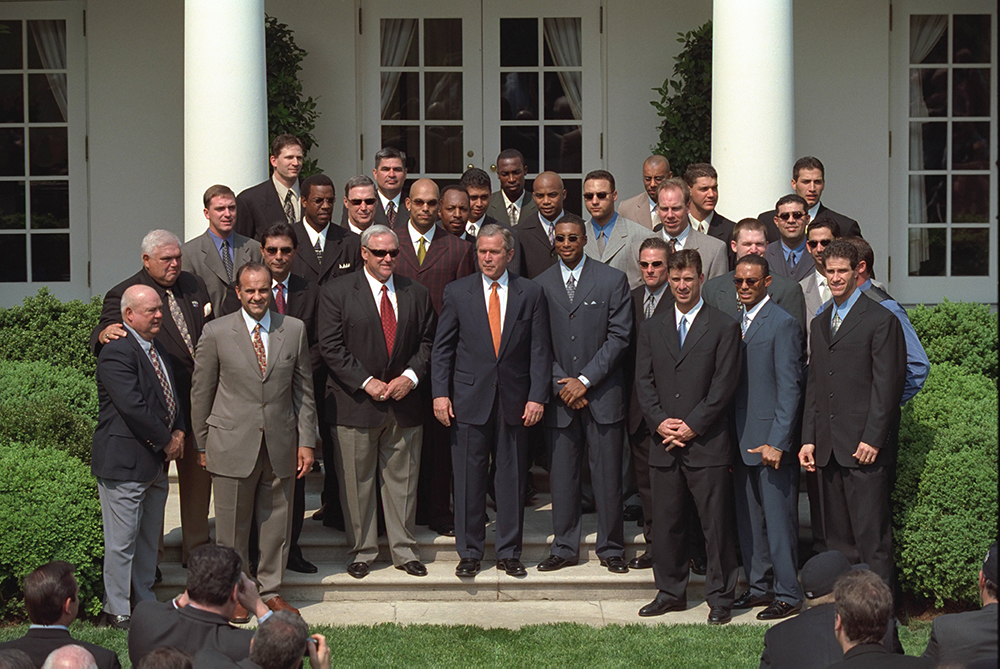
Pettitte (back right) and teammates from the 2000 World Series champion Yankees team pose with US President George W. Bush during a White House visit

The Yankees won the 1999 World Series. They continued their success in the 2000 season. Pettitte finished third in the AL in wins (19), sixth in winning percentage (.679), and seventh in complete games (3). He finished off the season with his fourth World Series Title.

In 2001, he made the All-Star team for the second time and was named the ALCS Most Valuable Player, after winning Games 1 and 5 against the Seattle Mariners in the 2001 ALCS. His performance in the 2001 World Series was less than stellar though, where he posted an 0-2 record and a 10.00 ERA in two starts amid suspicions that he was tipping his pitches. For the season, he was third in the AL in walks per nine innings (1.84), eighth in strikeouts (164), and eight in strikeouts per nine innings (7.36).

In 2002, he was ninth in the AL in winning percentage (.722) and complete games (3). Pettitte continued his success through 2003. Pettitte was second in the league in wins (21), fifth in winning percentage (.724), sixth in strikeouts (180; a career high) and strikeouts per nine innings (7.78; a career-best), eighth in games started (33), and ninth in walks per nine innings (2.16). He won the Warren Spahn Award, given annually to the best left-handed pitcher in baseball.

=== Houston Astros (2004–2006) ===
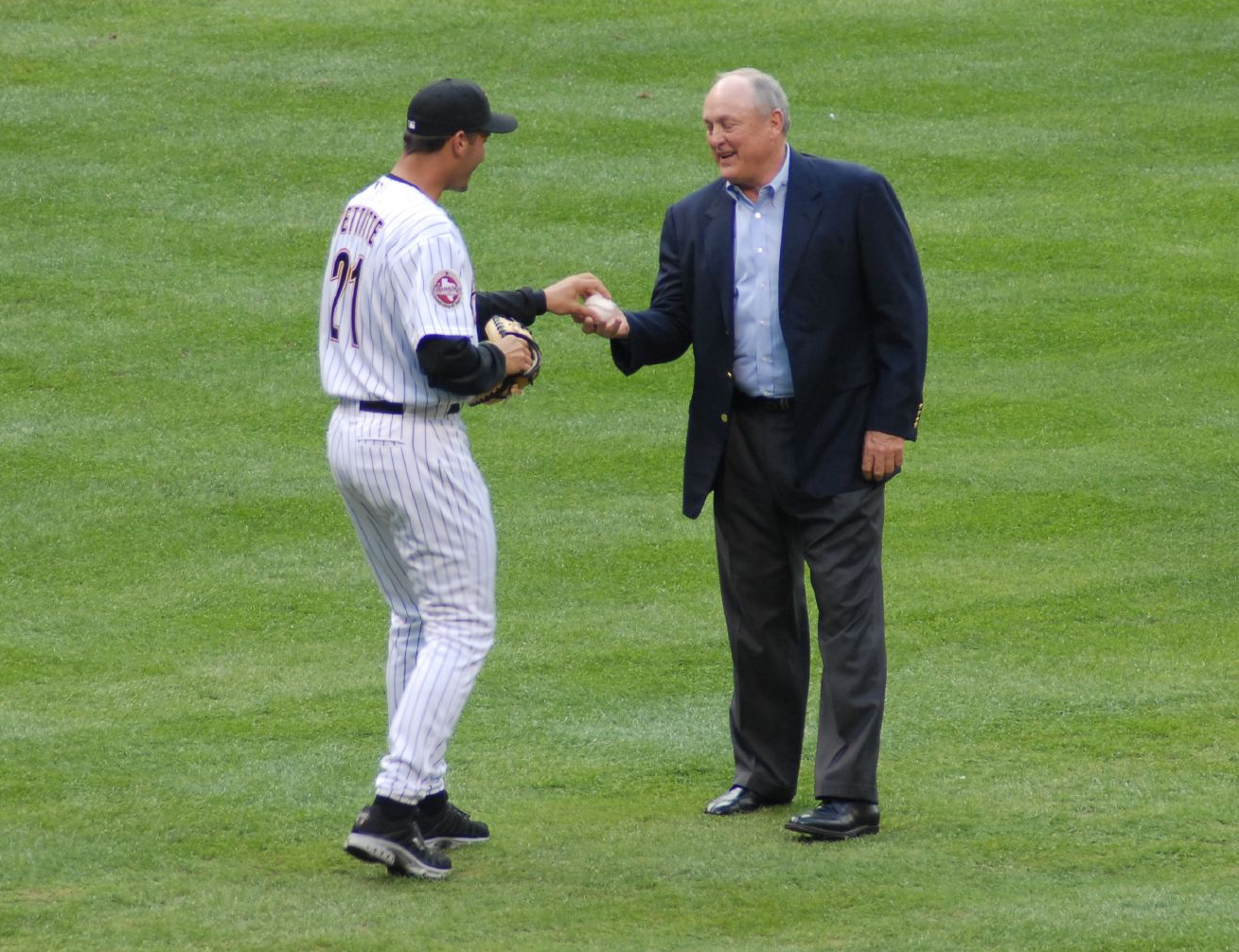
Pettitte (left) with Nolan Ryan

Pettitte became a free agent after the 2003 season. Interested in playing closer to his Deer Park home, and feeling that the Yankees were not interested in re-signing him, Pettitte signed a three-year, $31.5 million contract with the Houston Astros of the National League (NL). The best offer actually came from the Boston Red Sox, the historic rivals of the Yankees, at four years for $52 million, yet Pettitte never seriously considered signing with them. In Houston, Pettitte switched his uniform number to No. 21, in honor of Roger Clemens, who previously wore that number in Boston and Toronto. His 2004 season, in which he held batters to a .226 batting average, was shortened by elbow surgery to repair a torn flexor tendon.

Pettitte returned to form in the 2005 season to help the Astros reach their first-ever World Series. His 2.39 ERA was a career-best, and second in the NL behind teammate Clemens. He was also second in the league walks/9 IP (1.66) and LOB percentage (79.7%; a career best), third in sacrifice hits (15), fifth in wins (17), and eighth in winning percentage. (.654). He held left-handed batters, who over his career have outhit righties when batting against him, to a .200 batting average, had a career-best 4.17 SO/BB ratio. Pettitte went 14–13 with a 4.20 ERA during the 2006 season as the Astros missed the playoffs. He tied for the National League lead in starts (35), tied for sixth in pickoffs (4), and was eighth in double plays induced (26), and tenth in strikeouts (178) and batters faced (929).

=== Second stint with the New York Yankees (2007–2010) ===
After the 2006 season, Pettitte signed a one-year, $16 million contract with the New York Yankees with a player option for 2008 worth $16 million. The Astros had offered Pettitte $12 million for a one-year contract. Pettitte won his 200th career game on September 19, 2007. In 2007, he led the American League in starts (34), was seventh in batters faced (916), and was ninth in innings pitched (215 1/3), finishing the regular season with a 15–9 win–loss record. He also had the 5th-lowest HR/9 innings pitched ratio in the AL (0.67). After the season, Pettitte declined his 2008 option, becoming a free agent. The Yankees offered Pettitte salary arbitration, and Pettite accepted the Yankees offer. He signed a one-year, $16 million contract with the Yankees on December 12.

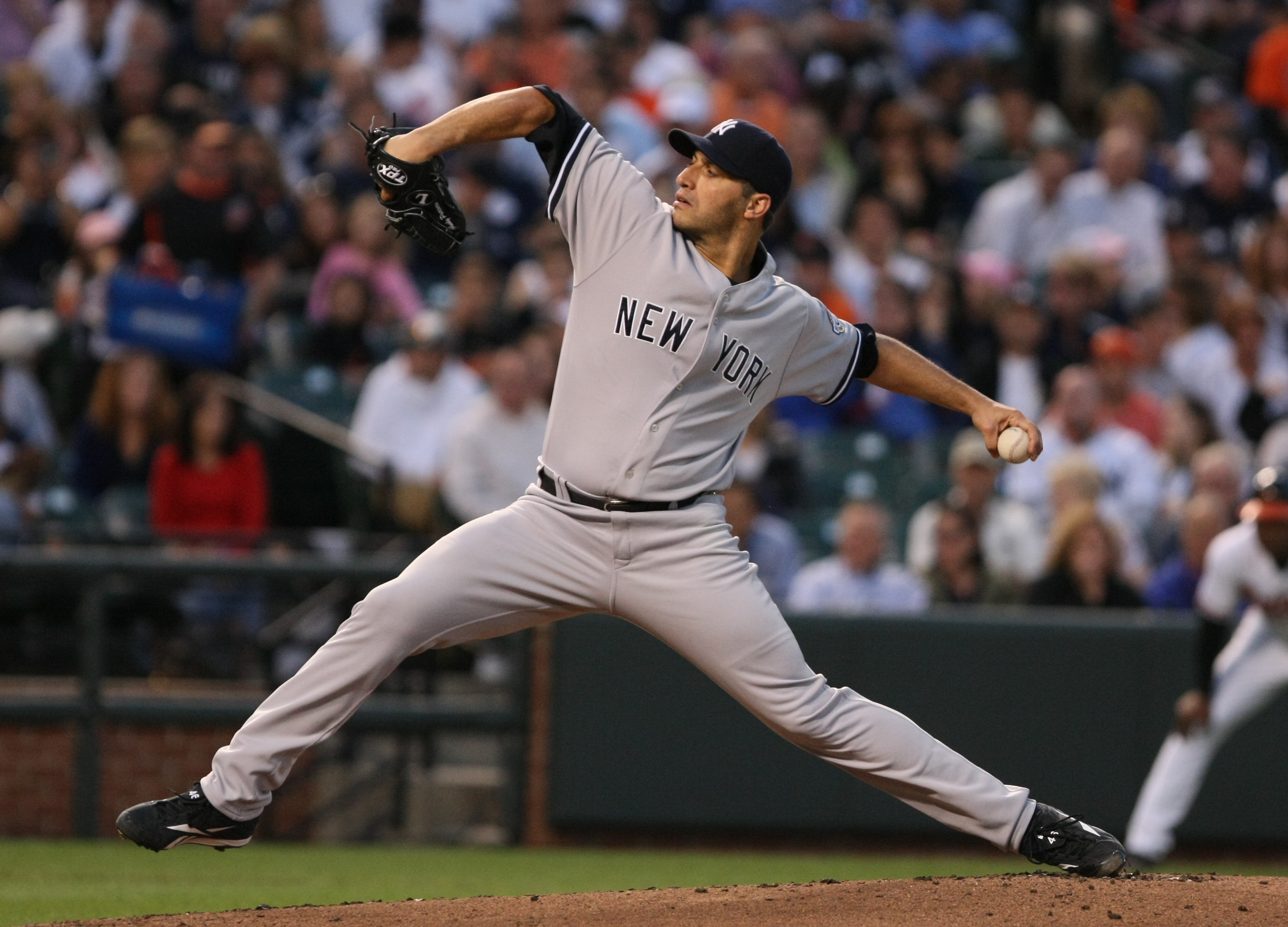
Pettitte in 2009

On September 21, 2008, Pettitte was the last starting pitcher for the Yankees at Yankee Stadium. He recorded his 2,000th career strikeout in the second inning, striking out Baltimore Orioles catcher Ramón Hernández. Pettitte led the Yankees in innings pitched in 2008 with 204. Over 14 seasons, Pettitte has averaged 158 strikeouts a season, the same number as he accumulated in 2008.

Pettitte agreed to a one-year, $5.5 million contract with incentives on January 26, 2009. Based on incentives such as innings pitched and days on the active roster, Pettitte eventually earned $10.5 million for 2009. Pettitte began the 2009 season as the Yankees' fourth starter, behind CC Sabathia, A. J. Burnett, and Chien-Ming Wang, followed by Joba Chamberlain.

Pettitte was the winning pitcher as the Yankees beat the Los Angeles Angels of Anaheim in Game 6 of the ALCS on October 25, 2009, to clinch the series and advance to the World Series against the Philadelphia Phillies. This brought his career total of series-clinching wins to five, breaking the record he previously shared with Roger Clemens, Catfish Hunter and Dave Stewart.

Pettitte drove in his first postseason run during Game 3 of the World Series when he got a single to center field that scored Nick Swisher. He was the winning pitcher for that game. Pettitte pitched Game 6 of the 2009 World Series on three days of rest. Experts were critical of the decision to pitch the 37-year-old on short rest, but Pettitte again was the winning pitcher in Game 6, defeating the Philadelphia Phillies 7–3. He extended his record career total series-clinching wins to six, and extended his record for post-season career wins to 18. He became the first pitcher in Major League Baseball history to start and win three series-clinching playoff games in the same year. Derek Lowe also won three series in 2004, but with one of his wins coming in relief. Additionally, on September 27 against the Red Sox, Pettitte had been the winning pitcher in the division-clinching game.

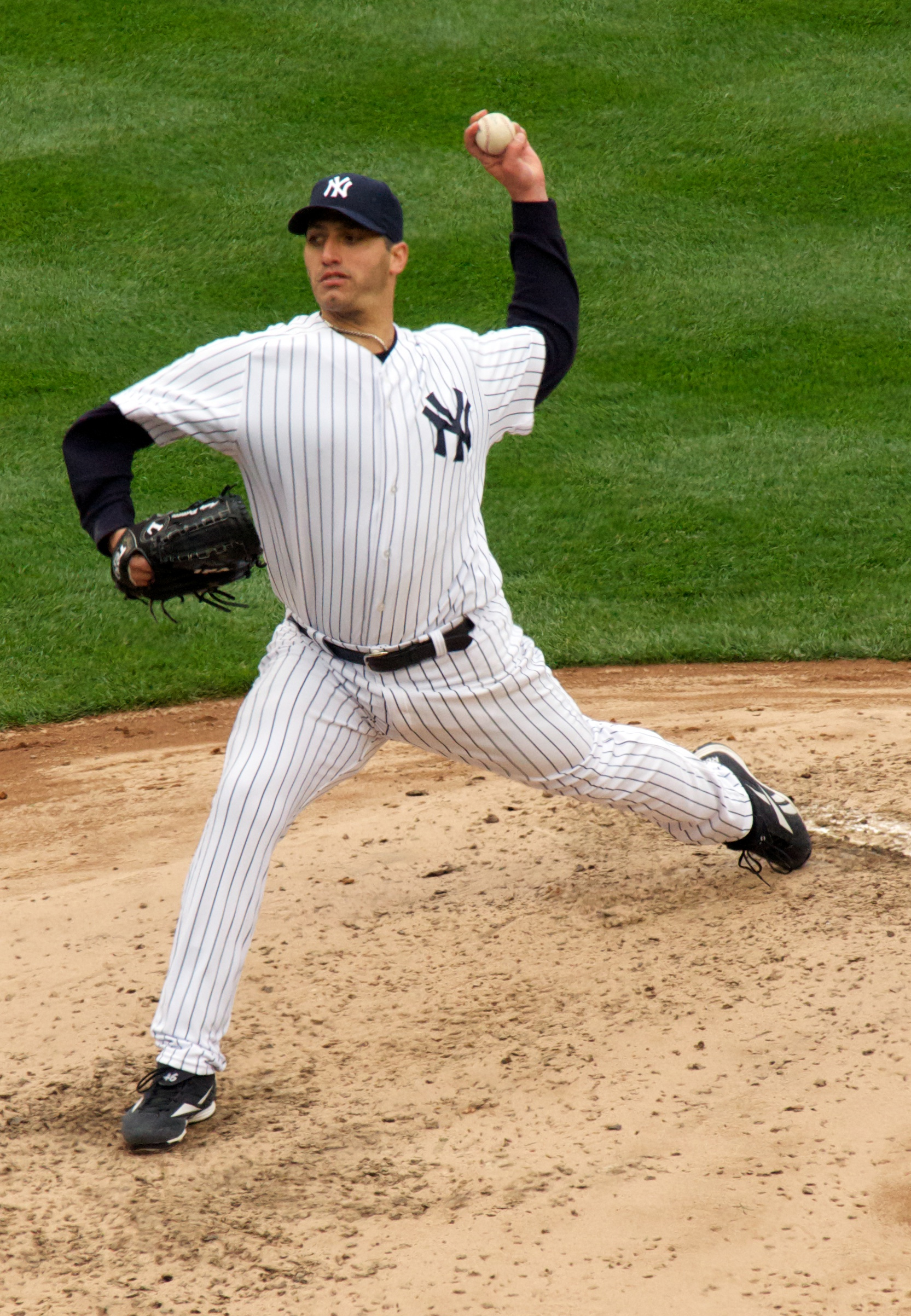
Pettitte pitching in 2010

Pettitte filed for free agency after the 2009 season. He re-signed with the Yankees, receiving a one-year contract worth $11.75 million. In the first half of the 2010 season, Pettitte went 11–2 with a 2.70 ERA, earning an appearance in the 2010 Major League Baseball All-Star Game. Pettitte finished the season with an 11–3 record and a 3.28 ERA, his lowest since 2005.

After months of speculation about his future, Pettitte announced his retirement on February 4, 2011. He spent the year away from professional baseball.

=== Comeback, third stint with the New York Yankees (2012–2013) ===
Pettitte agreed to join the Yankees in spring training in 2012 as a guest instructor. Stating that his return gave him "the itch", Pettitte signed a minor league contract with the Yankees worth $2.5 million on March 16, 2012. Pettitte began the season in the minor leagues pitching in games for different affiliates to build his endurance and pitch count. Pettitte returned on May 13, allowing four runs over 6 1/3 innings in a loss to the Seattle Mariners 6–2. During a game against the Cleveland Indians on June 27, 2012, Pettitte was hit hard on his ankle by a ground ball. Shortly thereafter, it was announced that Pettitte had a fractured left fibula and would be out for at least six weeks. Pettitte returned on September 19, 2012 against the Blue Jays, pitching five scoreless innings. He finished the season with a 5–4 record and a 2.87 ERA in 12 games started. He also made two postseason appearances.

Pettitte re-signed with the Yankees for the 2013 season, agreeing to a one-year, $12 million contract. On May 17, 2013, Pettitte was put on the 15-day disabled list due to a strained left trapezius muscle. He was activated on June 3. On June 8, Pettitte recorded his 250th career win against the Seattle Mariners, becoming the 47th pitcher in major league history to achieve as many wins. On July 1, in a game against the Minnesota Twins, Pettitte struck out Justin Morneau, thereby passing Whitey Ford as the Yankees all-time strikeout leader with 1,958. He struck out his 2,000th batter as a Yankee on September 6.

Pettitte announced on September 20 that he would retire at the end of the season. Teammate Mariano Rivera convinced him to announce it before the end of the season. Pettitte made his last regular season start at Yankee Stadium on September 22. Pettitte's last major league start, on September 28 against the Astros in Houston, tied Ford for the most games started in Yankees history (438). Pettitte pitched a complete game, allowing only one run on five hits and receiving the victory. The Astros honored his career during the game.

=== Career perspective ===
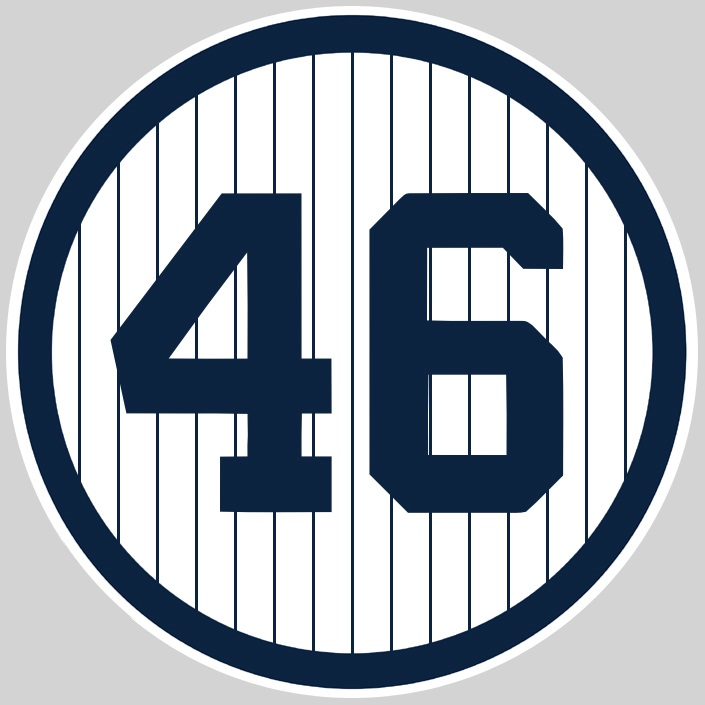
Andy Pettitte's number 46 was retired by the New York Yankees in 2015.

Pettitte won 20 games in a season twice, posting 21–8 records in 1996 and 2003. He was part of seven American League pennant-winning teams, one National League pennant-winning team and five World Series championship teams. He holds the record for most wins in postseason history with 19. He is the only MLB pitcher since 1930 to win at least 12 games in each of his first nine seasons. Pettitte recorded the second-most career pickoffs (98) behind Steve Carlton (144).

For his career, Pettitte had a 256–153 win–loss record with a 3.85 ERA and 2,448 strikeouts in 3,316 innings. He also never had a losing season in the major leagues. Among Yankees pitchers, Pettitte ranks first in strikeouts (2,020), tied-first in games started (438), and third in wins (219). Pettitte and Rivera have combined for a record 81 (11 in the playoffs) win-save combinations, the most in history. They, along with teammates Derek Jeter and Jorge Posada, have been noted as the "Core Four", as they were teammates for the five World Series won by the Yankees between 1996 and 2009. His 148 wins from 2000 to 2009 were the most of the decade.

Pettitte was 19–10 with a 3.81 ERA in the postseason. He holds the all-time postseason record for most wins, games started (44) and innings pitched (276 2/3). He retired with the postseason record for most home runs allowed with 31 until Justin Verlander and Clayton Kershaw each passed him. In 2009, he became the second pitcher in history to win three series-clinching games (ALDS, ALCS and World Series) in the same postseason (following Derek Lowe in 2004). When Pettitte started Game 3 of the 2009 World Series, he passed Christy Mathewson and Waite Hoyt, with the second most World Series starts. Whitey Ford is in front with 22 starts. Pettitte played in eight different World Series (seven with the Yankees, and one with the Astros), and been on the winning end of 19 postseason series—both of which were tops among active players. On February 16, 2015, the Yankees announced that they would be retiring Pettitte's number 46 on August 23, 2015.

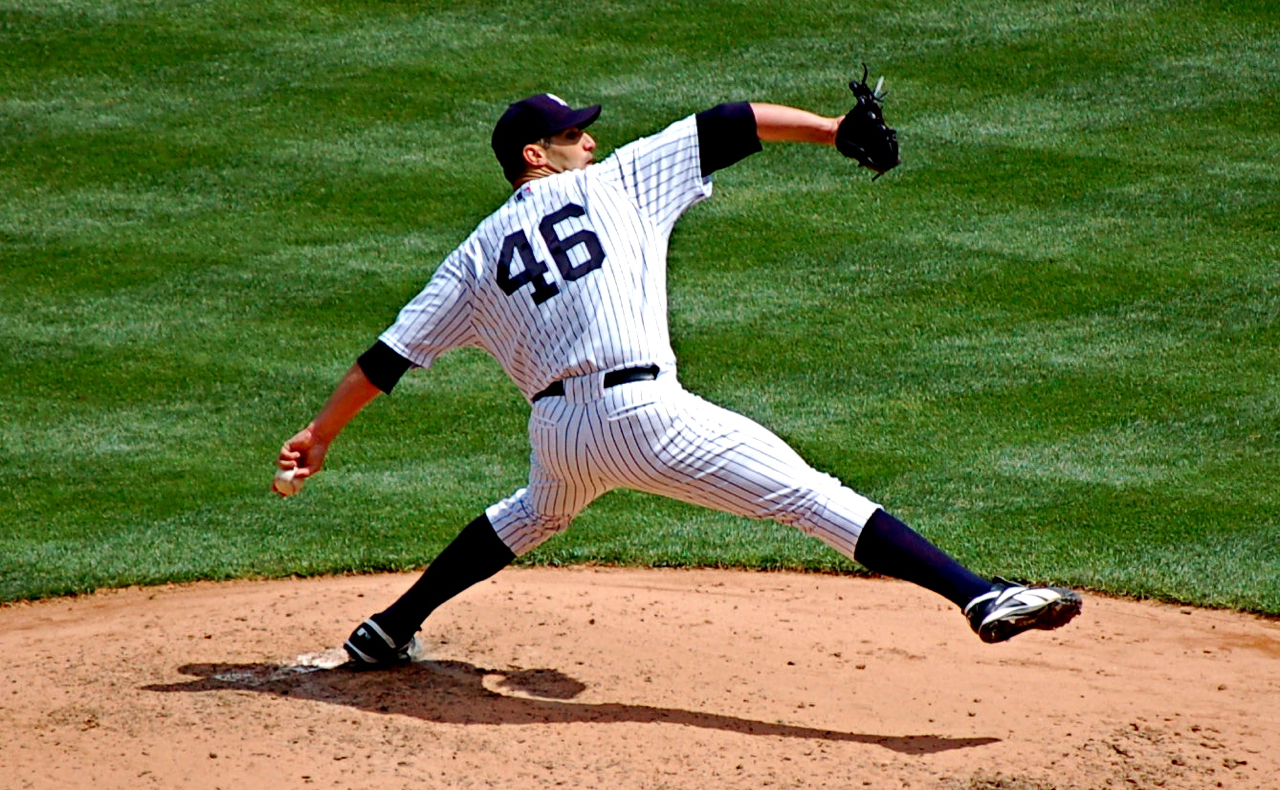
Pettitte pitching in 2008

When the National Baseball Hall of Fame ballot for 2019 was announced, Pettitte and former teammate Mariano Rivera were two of 20 players appearing on the ballot for the first time. Pettitte received 9.9% of the vote, which was above the 5% minimum required to remain on the ballot, but well short of the 75% required for election. He received 11.3% of the vote in the 2020 balloting, 13.7% of the vote in 2021 balloting, 10.7% of the vote in 2022 balloting, 17% of the vote in 2023 balloting, 13.5% in 2024 balloting, 27.9% in 2025 balloting, and 48.5% in 2026 balloting. A player may appear on the ballot a maximum of 10 times; Pettitte will be on his 9th appearance in 2027 balloting.

=== Performance-enhancing drugs ===
On September 30, 2006, the Los Angeles Times reported that former relief pitcher Jason Grimsley, during a raid by federal agents investigating steroids in baseball on June 6, 2006, named Pettitte as a user of performance-enhancing drugs. The Times reported that Pettitte was one of five names blacked out in an affidavit filed in federal court. Grimsley had told investigators that he got amphetamines, anabolic steroids, and human growth hormone (HGH) from someone (later named as Kirk Radomski) recommended to him by former Yankees trainer Brian McNamee, who is a personal strength coach for Roger Clemens and Pettitte. However, on October 3, 2006, The Washington Post reported that San Francisco United States attorney Kevin Ryan said that the Los Angeles Times report contained "significant inaccuracies." Contrary to the initial Los Angeles Times report, neither the name of Clemens nor Pettitte appeared in the affidavit submitted by Grimsley.

Pettitte was one of several Yankees named in the Mitchell Report, released on December 13, 2007. Mitchell and his staff received the information on Pettitte from McNamee, who told them he injected Pettitte with HGH on 2–4 occasions in 2002 so that he would heal from an elbow injury more quickly. Pettitte verified McNamee's claim, admitting to using the HGH on two occasions in 2002, as it was meant to help heal an injury, and not to enhance his performance. Pettitte said he felt an obligation to return to the team as quickly as possible. He denied any further usage of HGH during his career; he also denied use of steroids or any other performance-enhancing drug.

On February 13, 2008, in an affidavit made public as part of a hearing before the U.S. House of Representatives' Committee on Oversight and Governmental Reform, Pettitte admitted to additional injections of HGH twice in one day in 2004, using HGH obtained via prescription for his seriously ill father. Also in this affidavit, Pettitte recalled being told by former Yankees teammate Clemens in 1999 or 2000 that Clemens had recently received injections of HGH. Clemens claimed during the noted hearing that Pettitte "misremembered" Clemens's 1999 or 2000 HGH remark, alleging that what Pettitte really heard was Clemens's reporting of his wife's use of HGH at that time, though earlier during this same hearing Clemens denied knowing of any use of HGH by his wife. McNamee corroborated Pettitte's recollection of events.

On February 18, 2008, Pettitte reported to Yankees spring training and apologized to both Yankees and Astros fans for his past drug use. In the press conference, he said the performance-enhancing-drug scandal had put a "strain" on his relationship with Clemens, his close friend and former teammate.

== Pitching style ==
Pettitte threw a four-seam fastball, a cutter, a curveball, a sinker, a changeup to right-handed batters, and a slider. His out pitch was a cutter at 84–88 mph with good inside break on right-handed batters, resulting in a lot of ground ball outs and double plays. Before his original 2011 retirement, his fastball was measured in the lower 90s and his curveball was about 74–76 mph. As a left-handed pitcher, Pettitte had an exceptional pickoff move to first base, allowing him to record 98 career pickoffs.

== Personal life ==
Pettitte met his wife, Laura, in high school. They have four children: Josh, Jared, Lexy, and Luke. Pettitte and his wife are devout Christians. The family resides in Houston, although Pettitte also owned a home in Westchester County, New York before putting it up for sale in 2020.

All three of Pettitte's sons have played baseball. Josh was selected by the Yankees in the 37th round of the 2013 MLB draft, but enrolled at Baylor University rather than sign a professional contract. He played at Rice University after transferring from Baylor in April 2014, before announcing his retirement on Instagram after a series of injuries in February 2018. His son, Jared, played for the University of Houston before transferring to Dallas Baptist University in 2020. He signed a professional contract with the Miami Marlins. His third son, Luke, played for the baseball team at Dallas Baptist for three years, starting in 2024. He pitched two years for Dallas Baptist before receiving Tommy John surgery, where, in 2026, he shifted to hitting as he recovered. He was drafted in the 8th round (248th overall) by the New York Yankees as a two-way player (a hitter and pitcher) in the 2026 Major League Baseball draft. Pettitte's daughter plays volleyball at Dallas Baptist University.

On July 23, 2023, Pettitte returned to the New York Yankees as an advisor coach.

== See also ==
- Houston Astros award winners and league leaders
- List of athletes who came out of retirement
- List of Major League Baseball annual wins leaders
- List of Major League Baseball career batters faced leaders
- List of Major League Baseball career games started leaders
- List of Major League Baseball career strikeout leaders
- List of Major League Baseball career wins leaders
- List of Major League Baseball players named in the Mitchell Report
- List of New York Yankees team records
- List of people from Baton Rouge, Louisiana
- List of World Series starting pitchers
- New York Yankees award winners and league leaders

Awards and achievements
Preceded by David Cone	New York Yankees Opening Day starting pitcher 1998	Succeeded by Roger Clemens
