= Rani Whitfield =

Rani G. Whitfield (born March 8, 1969) is an American family physician and an author best known for his appearances on BET's series 106 & Park and iVillage. He is also the medical correspondent for the nationally syndicated Chuck D radio show on the Air America radio network. He resides in his native Baton Rouge, LA, USA.

== Education ==
Whitfield received a Bachelor of Science in Microbiology from Southern University in 1992. He completed his Medical Degree in 1996 at Meharry Medical College, and performed his internship and residency at St. Elizabeth Medical Center in Dayton, OH. He received his Sports Medicine Fellowship from the Ohio State University in 2000.

== Career ==
A contributor to the book, Not In My Family: AIDS in the African American Community, Whitfield was a featured speaker on talk show host Tavis Smiley's 2007 Road to Health Tour. He also writes a bi-weekly health column for the Electronic Urban Report and is a medical contributor to AOL Black Voices. In June 2007, Whitfield was featured in I Am A Father, a book edited by David Manuel about African American fatherhood. Also featured in the book included rapper Big Boi, Morgan Freeman, Ossie Davis, Kevin Lyles, Sidney Poitier, and Bishop Eddie Long to name a few.

Creator of the Tha Hip Hop Doc, Whitfield is an spokesperson for the American Heart Association and a Board Member for the organization's Southern Affiliates. He is also a member of the American Academy for Family Practice; American College of Sports Medicine; American Medical Society for Sports Medicine; Louisiana State Medical Association; and East Rouge Parish Medical Society.
