= Matt Tullos =

American writer

Matt Tullos (born 1963) is a writer and minister who has written over 700 dramatic sketches for worship, 10 books and numerous video projects. He has served in various roles at LifeWay Christian Resources. Tullos' dramatic collections, Aha Moments for Worship and Actors Not Included compile his works from 1983–2002. He was the vanguard editor of Let's Worship magazine produced by Lifeway Church Resources.

Tullos was born in Baton Rouge, Louisiana in 1963 where his father served as a minister of music at Florida Boulevard Baptist Church. His family later moved to the Los Angeles area. Later they returned to Louisiana. After serving at First Baptist Church in Mandeville, Louisiana and Coulter Road Baptist Church in Amarillo Texas, he was invited to join the editorial division of LifeWay. He worked with Lifeway in various capacities for 15 years. He and his wife, Darlene wrote and performed dramatic vignettes throughout the country for the years he served at Lifeway. Some of their best sketches were written on the subject of marriage and performed all over the nation at Lifeway's "Fall Festival of Marriage" conferences.

In 2006, he began serving as transitional pastor at Bluegrass Baptist Church in Hendersonville, Tennessee. In January, 2008, Tullos resigned his position at Lifeway to pastor at Bluegrass Baptist, which has now been renamed Indian Lake Peninsula Church. Matt is currently serving the Tennessee Baptist Mission Board. He is married to Darlene and together they have four grown sons.

Tullos is known for strongly evangelical sketches. He writes a monthly humor column for Homelife Magazine.

== Books ==
- Tullos, M., & Howell, G. B., Jr., et al. Lordship Generosity: Giving All to the One Who Gave All. March 13, 2024.
- Tullos, M. 39 Words: A Contemplative Journey to the Cross. January 29, 2015.
- Tullos, M., & Craig, R. He Came for the Rest of Us: 20 Readings for Worship and Devotionals. November 20, 2014.
- Tullos, M. The Movements of the Divine: 400 Blessings and Meditations. May 27, 2014.
- Tullos, M. Holy Hears a Who. January 26, 2011.
- Tullos, M. Romans: A New Paraphrase of Paul's Letter to the Romans (The Conversational Bible). January 1, 2010.
- Kendrick, S., Kendrick, A., et al. The Love Dare Bible Study (Updated Edition) - Member Book. June 1, 2015.
- Tullos, M. Bananas Not Included. January 1, 1994.
