= Sally Clausen =

American educational administrator

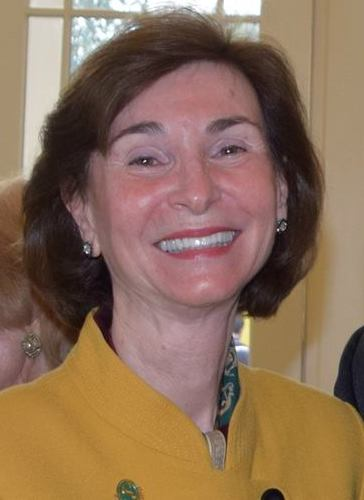
- Born: July 4, 1945 (age 81)
- Education: Louisiana State University
- Occupation: Educational administrator
- Political party: Democrat
- Spouse: Robert Brumberger
- Children: 2
- Relatives: Thomas G. Clausen

Sally Clausen (born July 4, 1945) is an American administrator who is executive director of the Ingram Center for Public Trusteeship and Governance, an affiliate of the American Association of Governing Boards of Universities and Colleges. She earlier, in 2010, retired as Louisiana's commissioner of public higher education, a post she had held for one year relinquishing the presidency of the University of Louisiana System. Previously she served as the first female president of Southeastern Louisiana University in Hammond.

== Background ==
Clausen's mother, Leonell Wilkes Clausen, was a native of Centerville who formerly lived in Verdunville, both communities in St. Mary Parish in South Louisiana. She died in 1999 while living in Baton Rouge. "Mama Nell" Clausen, as she was known, drove a school bus, delivered food to shut-ins, worked in a school for the handicapped, and was a justice of the peace in St. Mary Parish. Clausen's late brother, Thomas Greenwood Clausen, was the last elected Louisiana superintendent of education, a position which he held from 1984 to 1988.

== Education ==
In 1967, 1971, and 1980, Clausen received bachelor's, master's, and doctorate in education, respectively, from Louisiana State University in Baton Rouge.

== Career ==
Her classroom experience was from 1968 to 1971 with the East Baton Rouge Parish system. From 1984 to 1988, Clausen was the assistant Commissioner of Administration during the third term of Governor Edwin Edwards. From 1988 to 1990, she was the commissioner of higher education under the Louisiana Board of Regents, a body created by the Louisiana Constitution of 1974. From 1991 to 1992, she was assistant dean of students at Southeastern Louisiana University in Hammond. From 1992 to 1995, she was secretary of education in the fourth and final Edwards administration. Clausen returned to Southeastern Louisiana University in the summer of 1995, where she was the president until July 2001, when she was elevated to president of the University of Louisiana System.

At Southeastern, Clausen listed her accomplishments as president as having obtained $80 million in capital improvements, a 23 percent increase in faculty salaries, a 51 percent increase in state appropriations, a large increase in private funding, and a 68 percent boost in African-American enrollment.

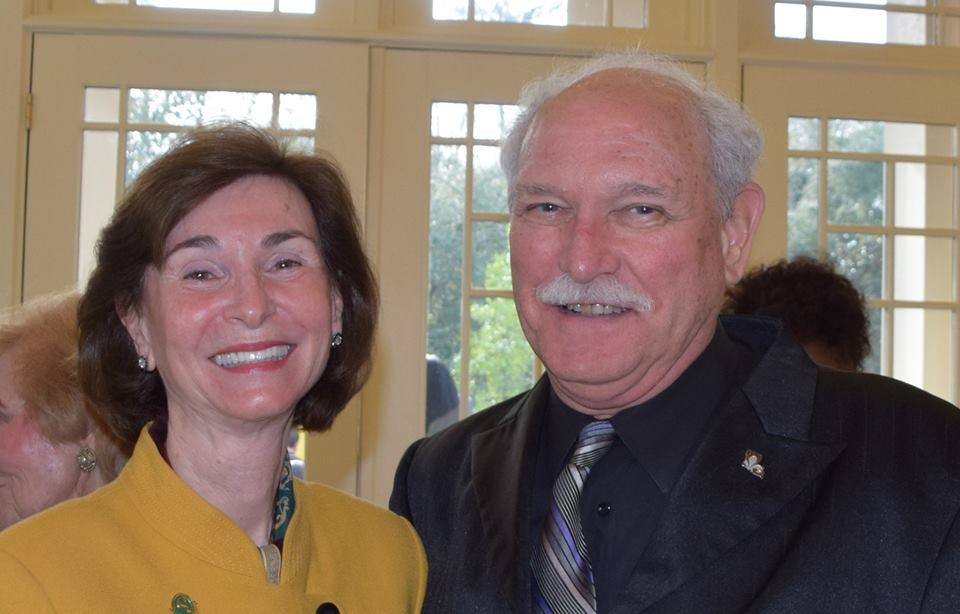
Dr Sally Clausen at Southeastern Louisiana University's 2015 Chefs Evening fundraising event (retired professor Dr David Ramsey, right)

In 2009, Clausen retired as the sixth commissioner of higher education, a year after she had assumed the position in July 2008, at an annual salary of $425,000. She did not inform the regents that she was retiring. Instead, a day later she was rehired as the commissioner. This maneuver boosted her pay to $515,625. She received a lump-sum payment in mid-August 2009 for three hundred hours of unused vacation time and two hundred hours of remaining sick leave. When news of this situation leaked, Clausen said that she had considered retiring to help care for a special-needs grandchild in Houston. But she decided to remain commissioner. Amid controversy over her action, Clausen said that she would reduce her salary in 2010 to $199,000 as a gesture to show solidarity with employees placed under wage restraints and a proposed 30 percent cut in state higher education spending announced by the administration of Governor Bobby Jindal. The controversy caused her to retire from the State of Louisiana in June 2010.

== Legacy ==
In 1998, Clausen was inducted into the Louisiana Center for Women and Government Hall of Fame. In 2000, she received the "Thinking Outside the Box" Award from U.S. Senator Mary Landrieu of Louisiana. In 2004, she was inducted into the LSU Alumni Hall of Distinction. In 2007, Clausen was inducted into the Louisiana Political Museum and Hall of Fame in Winnfield.

The Livingston Parish Literacy and Technology Center building in Walker, a joint venture with Southeastern Louisiana University, is named for the Clausen family.
