= Louisiana Board of Regents =

Education board in Louisiana, USA

Agency overview
- Formed: January 1, 1975
- Jurisdiction: Louisiana, United States
- Headquarters: Baton Rouge, Louisiana
- Agency executives: Misti S. Cordell, Chair; Terrie P. Sterling, Vice Chair
- Website: laregents.edu

The Louisiana Board of Regents is a government agency in the U.S. state of Louisiana that is responsible for coordination of all public higher education in the state. The Board was created under the terms of the 1974 Louisiana Constitution, and began operations effective January 1, 1975.

It consists of 15 members, 14 of whom are appointed by the Governor to six-year, overlapping terms. Each of Louisiana's six congressional districts is represented by at least one regent but no more than two. The Louisiana Constitution also entitles the Louisiana Legislature to appoint a student member to the Board as the Regents' 15th member. Commissioner Sally Clausen resigned in 2010 after a controversy centered on her one-day retirement in 2009 in order to collect vacation and sick leave pay and to draw both retirement and salary in excess of $500,000 annually.

The Board funds various education programs across the state, including the Center for Adult Learning in Louisiana.

== See also ==
- Edith Killgore Kirkpatrick
- Dale Thorn
- Edwards Barham
