= 1974 in baseball =

The following are the baseball events of the year 1974 throughout the world.

== Champions ==
=== Major League Baseball ===
- 1974 World Series: Oakland Athletics over Los Angeles Dodgers (4–1); Rollie Fingers, MVP

League Championship Series (ALCS, NLCS)
East | Baltimore | 1
West | Oakland | 3
East | Pittsburgh | 1
West | Los Angeles | 3

World Series
AL | Oakland | 4
NL | Los Angeles | 1

- All-Star Game, July 23 at Three Rivers Stadium: National League, 7–2; Steve Garvey, MVP

=== Other champions ===
- College World Series: USC
- Japan Series: Lotte Orions over Chunichi Dragons (4–1)
- Big League World Series: Taipei, Taiwan
- Little League World Series: Kaohsiung, Taiwan
- Senior League World Series: Pingtung, Taiwan

Winter Leagues

- 1974 Caribbean Series: Criollos de Caguas
- Dominican Republic League: Tigres del Licey
- Mexican Pacific League: Venados de Mazatlán
- Puerto Rican League: Criollos de Caguas
- Venezuelan League: *

* The season was canceled due to a player's strike and the Mexican Pacific League's second place, Yaquis de Obregón, played as a replacement in the Caribbean Series.

== Awards and honors ==
- Baseball Hall of Fame
  - Cool Papa Bell
  - Jim Bottomley
  - Whitey Ford
  - Mickey Mantle
  - Sam Thompson
  - Jocko Conlan (umpire)

Baseball Writers' Association of America Awards
| BBWAA Award | National League | American League |
|---|---|---|
| Rookie of the Year | Bake McBride (STL) | Mike Hargrove (TEX) |
| Cy Young Award | Mike Marshall (LAD) | Catfish Hunter (OAK) |
| Most Valuable Player | Steve Garvey (LAD) | Jeff Burroughs (TEX) |
| Babe Ruth Award (World Series MVP) | — | Dick Green (OAK) |
Gold Glove Awards
| Position | National League | American League |
| Pitcher | Andy Messersmith (LAD) | Jim Kaat (CWS) |
| Catcher | Johnny Bench (CIN) | Thurman Munson (NYY) |
| 1st Base | Steve Garvey (LAD) | George Scott (MIL) |
| 2nd Base | Joe Morgan (CIN) | Bobby Grich (BAL) |
| 3rd Base | Doug Rader (HOU) | Brooks Robinson (BAL) |
| Shortstop | Dave Concepción (CIN) | Mark Belanger (BAL) |
| Outfield | Bobby Bonds (SF) | Paul Blair (BAL) |
| Outfield | César Cedeño (HOU) | Amos Otis (KC) |
| Outfield | César Gerónimo (CIN) | Joe Rudi (OAK) |

== Statistical leaders ==
| | American League | | National League | |
| Stat | Player | Total | Player | Total |
|---|---|---|---|---|
| AVG | Rod Carew (MIN) | .364 | Ralph Garr (ATL) | .353 |
| HR | Dick Allen (CWS) | 32 | Mike Schmidt (PHI) | 36 |
| RBI | Jeff Burroughs (TEX) | 118 | Johnny Bench (CIN) | 129 |
| W | Catfish Hunter (OAK); Ferguson Jenkins (TEX) | 25 | Andy Messersmith (LAD); Phil Niekro (ATL) | 20 |
| ERA | Catfish Hunter (OAK) | 2.49 | Buzz Capra (ATL) | 2.28 |
| K | Nolan Ryan (CAL) | 367 | Steve Carlton (PHI) | 240 |

== Major league baseball final standings ==
=== American League final standings ===
AL East
| Team | W | L | Pct. | GB | Home | Road |
|---|---|---|---|---|---|---|
| ^{(1)} Baltimore Orioles | 91 | 71 | .562 | — | 46‍–‍35 | 45‍–‍36 |
| New York Yankees | 89 | 73 | .549 | 2 | 47‍–‍34 | 42‍–‍39 |
| Boston Red Sox | 84 | 78 | .519 | 7 | 46‍–‍35 | 38‍–‍43 |
| Cleveland Indians | 77 | 85 | .475 | 14 | 40‍–‍41 | 37‍–‍44 |
| Milwaukee Brewers | 76 | 86 | .469 | 15 | 40‍–‍41 | 36‍–‍45 |
| Detroit Tigers | 72 | 90 | .444 | 19 | 36‍–‍45 | 36‍–‍45 |

AL West
| Team | W | L | Pct. | GB | Home | Road |
|---|---|---|---|---|---|---|
| ^{(2)} Oakland Athletics | 90 | 72 | .556 | — | 49‍–‍32 | 41‍–‍40 |
| Texas Rangers | 84 | 76 | .525 | 5 | 42‍–‍38 | 42‍–‍38 |
| Minnesota Twins | 82 | 80 | .506 | 8 | 48‍–‍33 | 34‍–‍47 |
| Chicago White Sox | 80 | 80 | .500 | 9 | 46‍–‍34 | 34‍–‍46 |
| Kansas City Royals | 77 | 85 | .475 | 13 | 40‍–‍41 | 37‍–‍44 |
| California Angels | 68 | 94 | .420 | 22 | 36‍–‍45 | 32‍–‍49 |

Locations of teams for the 1974–1975 American League seasons
West East

=== National League final standings ===
NL East
| Team | W | L | Pct. | GB | Home | Road |
|---|---|---|---|---|---|---|
| ^{(2)} Pittsburgh Pirates | 88 | 74 | .543 | — | 52‍–‍29 | 36‍–‍45 |
| St. Louis Cardinals | 86 | 75 | .534 | 1½ | 44‍–‍37 | 42‍–‍38 |
| Philadelphia Phillies | 80 | 82 | .494 | 8 | 46‍–‍35 | 34‍–‍47 |
| Montreal Expos | 79 | 82 | .491 | 8½ | 42‍–‍38 | 37‍–‍44 |
| New York Mets | 71 | 91 | .438 | 17 | 36‍–‍45 | 35‍–‍46 |
| Chicago Cubs | 66 | 96 | .407 | 22 | 32‍–‍49 | 34‍–‍47 |

NL West
| Team | W | L | Pct. | GB | Home | Road |
|---|---|---|---|---|---|---|
| ^{(1)} Los Angeles Dodgers | 102 | 60 | .630 | — | 52‍–‍29 | 50‍–‍31 |
| Cincinnati Reds | 98 | 64 | .605 | 4 | 50‍–‍31 | 48‍–‍33 |
| Atlanta Braves | 88 | 74 | .543 | 14 | 46‍–‍35 | 42‍–‍39 |
| Houston Astros | 81 | 81 | .500 | 21 | 46‍–‍35 | 35‍–‍46 |
| San Francisco Giants | 72 | 90 | .444 | 30 | 37‍–‍44 | 35‍–‍46 |
| San Diego Padres | 60 | 102 | .370 | 42 | 36‍–‍45 | 24‍–‍57 |

Locations of teams for the 1971–1976 National League seasons
West East

== Nippon Professional Baseball final standings ==
=== Central League final standings ===
Central League
| Team | G | W | L | T | Pct. | GB |
|---|---|---|---|---|---|---|
| Chunichi Dragons | 130 | 70 | 49 | 11 | .588 | – |
| Yomiuri Giants | 130 | 71 | 50 | 9 | .587 | 0.0 |
| Yakult Swallows | 130 | 60 | 63 | 7 | .488 | 12.0 |
| Hanshin Tigers | 130 | 57 | 64 | 9 | .471 | 14.0 |
| Taiyo Whales | 130 | 55 | 69 | 6 | .444 | 17.5 |
| Hiroshima Toyo Carp | 130 | 54 | 72 | 4 | .429 | 19.5 |

=== Pacific League final standings ===
Pacific League
| Team | G | W | L | T | Pct. | 1st half ranking | 2nd half ranking |
|---|---|---|---|---|---|---|---|
| Lotte Orions | 130 | 69 | 50 | 11 | .580 | 2 | 1 |
| Hankyu Braves | 130 | 69 | 51 | 10 | .575 | 1 | 3 |
| Nankai Hawks | 130 | 59 | 55 | 16 | .518 | 4 | 2 |
| Taiheiyo Club Lions | 130 | 59 | 64 | 7 | .480 | 3 | 4 |
| Kintetsu Buffaloes | 130 | 56 | 66 | 8 | .459 | 5 | 4 |
| Nippon-Ham Fighters | 130 | 49 | 75 | 6 | .395 | 6 | 6 |

== Events ==
=== January ===
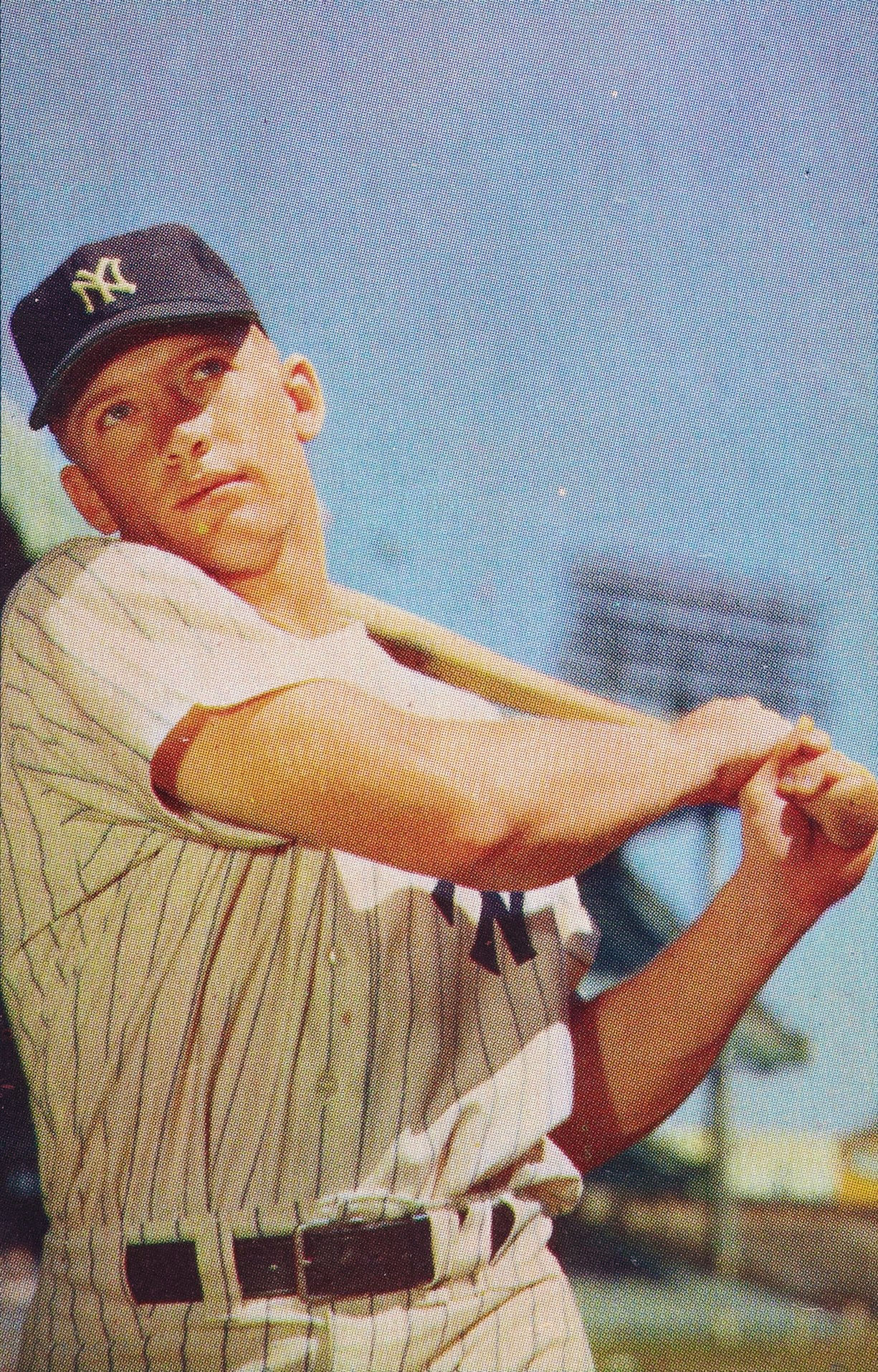
Mickey Mantle

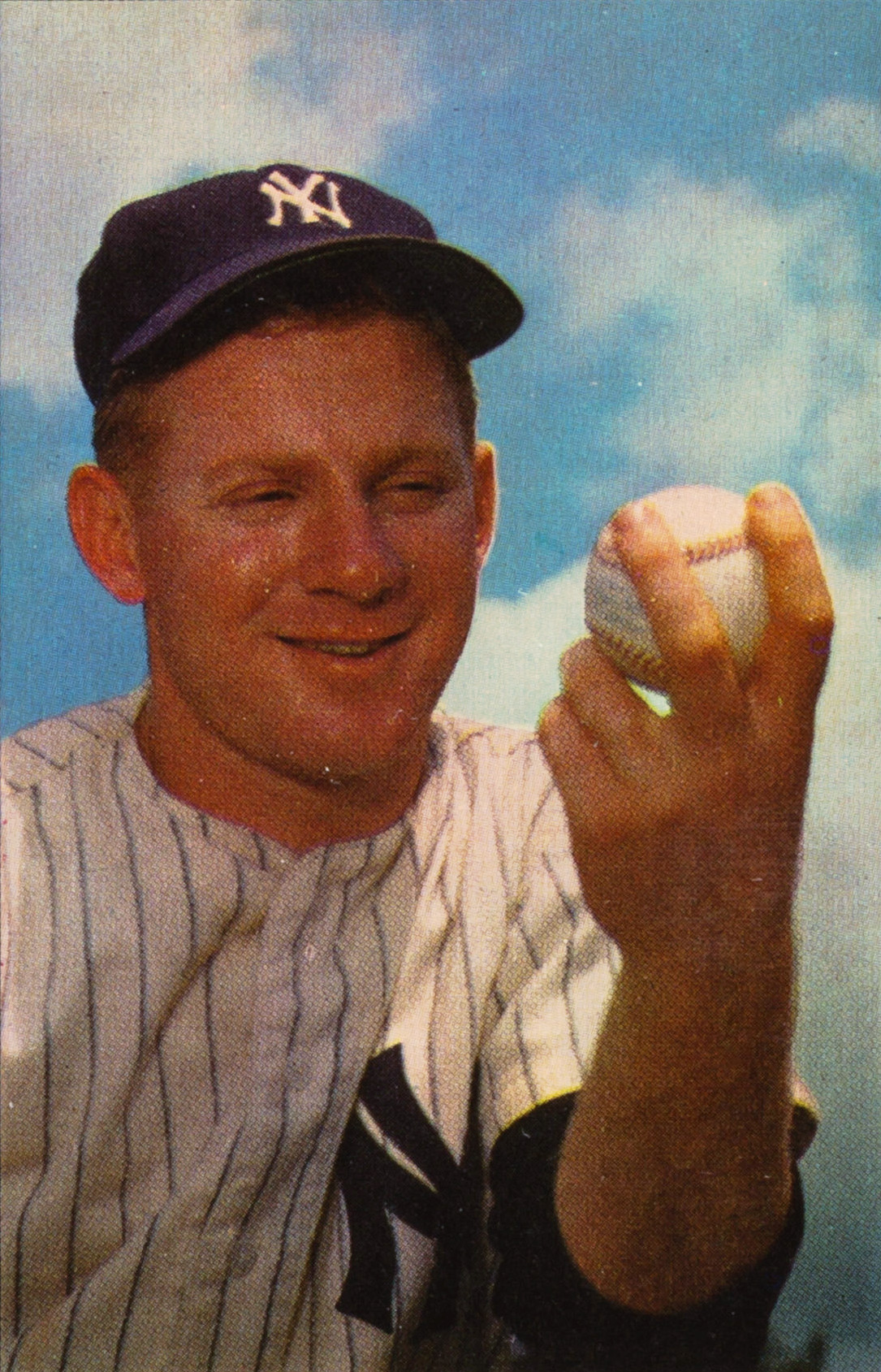
Whitey Ford

- January 1 – Lee MacPhail, 56, becomes the fifth president of the American League.
- January 3 – Thwarted in their attempt to sign Dick Williams as their manager for 1974—and unwilling to negotiate with Oakland Athletics' owner Charles O. Finley to obtain Williams' release—the New York Yankees hire Bill Virdon as their pilot. Virdon, 42, managed the Pittsburgh Pirates to a 163–128 record and a National League East Division title from Opening Day 1972 until his unexpected firing on September 6, 1973. Although not the Yankees' first choice, Virdon will win the 1974 The Sporting News Manager of the Year Award.
- January 9:
  - National League owners reject the proposed sale of the San Diego Padres to the owner of the Hollywood Park Racetrack, Marje Lindheimer Everett, leaving the team's future in Southern California in limbo.
  - The St. Louis Cardinals purchase the contract of outfielder Jay Johnstone from the Oakland Athletics.
- January 16 – The Baseball Writers' Association of America elects former New York Yankees teammates Mickey Mantle and Whitey Ford to the Hall of Fame. Mantle becomes only the seventh player to make it in his first try.
- January 23 – Franchise-restaurant tycoon Ray Kroc, 71, the owner of McDonald's Corporation, steps forward to buy the Padres from embattled founding owner C. Arnholt Smith for $12 million and vows to keep the five-year-old team in San Diego. Kroc will own the Padres until his death, almost ten full years later, and firmly establish their presence in that city. Kroc retains club president Buzzie Bavasi and its general manager, Bavasi's son Peter.

=== February ===
- February 4 – With spring training just days away, the newly sold San Diego Padres hire John McNamara as the third manager in team history. McNamara, 41, managed the Oakland Athletics to a 97–78 record from September 19, 1969, through 1970, and has been the San Francisco Giants' third-base coach since 1971. He replaces Don Zimmer, fired by San Diego at the close of the 1973 season.
- February 11 – Dick Woodson becomes the first player to invoke the new free agency clause, seeking a $30,000 salary while the Minnesota Twins offer $23,000. The arbitrator sides with Woodson. On May 4, the Twins trade Woodson to the New York Yankees for Mike Pazik and cash.
- February 13 – Cool Papa Bell is named for Hall of Fame honors by the Special Committee on the Negro Leagues.
- February 18 – The Cincinnati Reds obtain 23-year-old right-hander Pat Darcy and cash from the Houston Astros in exchange for veteran infielder Denis Menke. As a rookie in 1975, Darcy will win 11 games for the Reds and earn a World Series ring, and also become known for surrendering Carlton Fisk's famous game-winning home run in Game 6.
- February 20 – The defending 1973 World Series champion Oakland Athletics fill their managerial vacancy just three days before spring training, hiring Alvin Dark, 52, who managed the Kansas City Athletics from 1966 through August 19, 1967, when he was fired amidst a player uprising against owner Charles O. Finley. In Oakland, Dark succeeds Dick Williams, who quit immediately after winning his second straight world title on October 21, 1973.
- February 23 – The California Angels send veteran outfielder Vada Pinson to the Kansas City Royals for pitcher Barry Raziano and cash considerations. Pinson will call it quits at the end of the 1975 season, having rung up 2,757 hits.

=== March ===
- March 19 – The Detroit Tigers, New York Yankees and Cleveland Indians make a three-team trade. The deal sees the Yankees trade catcher Jerry Moses to Detroit for pitcher Ed Farmer, the Tigers send veteran pitcher Jim Perry to Cleveland, and the Indians move outfielder Walt Williams and pitcher Rick Sawyer to New York. Two days later, the Yankees sell Farmer's contract to the Philadelphia Phillies.
- March 26 – The Boston Red Sox release two future Hall of Famers: shortstop Luis Aparicio, who retires, and designated hitter Orlando Cepeda, who will sign with the Kansas City Royals.
- March 30 – With 18-year-old future Hall of Famer Robin Yount about to break into their lineup as their regular shortstop, the Milwaukee Brewers acquire Yount's elder brother Larry, a pitcher, from the Houston Astros for outfielder Wilbur Howard.

=== April ===
- April 1 – The Chicago Cubs release pitcher and three time All-Star Milt Pappas. A 17-year veteran, Pappas went 209–164 (3.40 ERA) in 520 games almost evenly split between American and National League service. He never again pitches in the majors.
- April 3:
  - The Cleveland Indians trade 17-year-old minor-leaguer Pedro Guerrero to the Los Angeles Dodgers for pitcher Bruce Ellingsen. Infielder-outfielder Guerrero will compile a .309 lifetime batting average and be named to the NL All-Star team five times during his 11 seasons (1978–1988) with Los Angeles.
  - The Philadelphia Phillies sign veteran free agent outfielder/pinch hitter Jay Johnstone, released by the St. Louis Cardinals on March 26. Johnstone, 28, will bat .303 in 462 games for the 1974–1978 Phillies, and in the 1976 NLCS, he'll be a bright spot in a losing cause when he goes seven-for-nine (.778) in "The Big Red Machine's" three-game sweep.

Hank Aaron (third from left) in 2010 with fellow Hall of Famers Bruce Sutter, Reggie Jackson and Rickey Henderson

- April 4 – In his first at bat of the 1974 National League season, on Opening Day at Riverfront Stadium, Hank Aaron smashes the 714th home run of his career, tying Babe Ruth's lifetime record. Jack Billingham surrenders #714, but his homestanding Cincinnati Reds defeat Aaron's Atlanta Braves, 7–6.
- April 6:
  - Commissioner of Baseball Bowie Kuhn orders Atlanta Braves manager Eddie Mathews to insert Hank Aaron into his club's lineup for tomorrow's game in Cincinnati against the Reds—unless there is a "very strong reason not to." After tying Ruth's record April 4, and an off-day April 5, Aaron was "benched" today. Kuhn is concerned that the Braves are holding Aaron out of the lineup to ensure that he breaks Babe Ruth's record in his home ballpark. Aaron will go hitless in three at bats tomorrow, April 7, in a 5–3 Braves' victory, setting up a potential record-shattering home run in the Braves' home opener at Atlanta–Fulton County Stadium on Monday, April 8.
  - The New York Yankees defeat the Cleveland Indians 6–1 in their "home opener" at Shea Stadium. The Yankees will share this ballpark with the Mets for the 1974 and 1975 seasons, while Yankee Stadium is being re-furbished.
- April 8 – Before a national television audience, Atlanta's Hank Aaron hits home run #715, breaking Babe Ruth's lifetime home run record. The blow, off Los Angeles Dodgers southpaw Al Downing, comes in the fourth inning of the Braves' home opener and before 53,775 exuberant fans. Two young men run onto the field and congratulate Aaron on his record-breaking achievement as Hank moves past second base.
- April 9 – In the eighth inning of their home opener, with the San Diego Padres trailing the Houston Astros 9–2 and about to lose their fourth straight game of 1974, the Padres' new owner, hamburger chain millionaire Ray Kroc, commandeers the public-address microphone at San Diego Stadium. "Fans, I suffer with you," a disgusted Kroc booms over the loudspeakers. "I have never seen such stupid ball-playing in my life!" The fans cheer, but players on both sides are furious, resenting what Houston third baseman Doug Rader calls being treated "like a bunch of short-order cooks." Kroc later apologizes for his outburst; then, when Rader's remarks cause offense, he apologizes to short-order cooks.
- April 10 – The 1973 National League pennant is raised before the home opener in which the New York Mets defeat the St. Louis Cardinals, 3–2, before only 17,154 fans at Shea Stadium. Jerry Grote of the Mets homers in that game.
- April 14 – Graig Nettles of the New York Yankees hits four home runs during a doubleheader split against his former team, the Cleveland Indians. The Yankees win 9–5, then lose 9–6. Nettles will go on to tie a major league record with 11 home runs in the month of April.
- April 17:
  - At County Stadium, Cooperstown-bound pitcher Gaylord Perry of the Cleveland Indians strikes out 14 and goes 15 full innings against the Milwaukee Brewers, then exits the game with the teams tied, four all. In the home half of the 16th, Cleveland reliever Ken Sanders replaces Perry and is greeted by a walk-off home run from the lead-off hitter, Brewer centerfielder Bob Coluccio.
  - New Chicago Cubs catcher George Mitterwald hits three home runs and drives in eight runs as the Cubs defeat the Pittsburgh Pirates 16–9 at Wrigley Field. As an added oddity, Burt Hooton goes the distance for the Cubs despite giving up 16 hits.
- April 18 – The Montreal Expos' Jim Cox belts a three-run home run off the New York Mets' Ray Sadecki in the third inning, part of the Expos' 8–5 win over the fading Mets, who have dropped five in a row. The Mets will fail to defend their 1973 National League pennant en route to their first losing season since 1968.
- April 24 – All 21 hits by both teams in the Chicago White Sox 7–2 victory over the Milwaukee Brewers are singles.
- April 26:
  - The record breaking is not over for Hank Aaron. Today he hits his 15th career grand slam home run, passing Gil Hodges and Willie McCovey for the NL mark. The Braves go on to beat the Cubs, 9–3.
  - The New York Yankees trade pitcher Fritz Peterson, who had in 1973 attracted unwelcomed attention when he announced that he and a teammate had swapped wives and families. Peterson goes to the Cleveland Indians, along with pitchers Fred Beene, Tom Buskey and Steve Kline for pitchers Cecil Upshaw and Dick Tidrow and first baseman Chris Chambliss. Chambliss will become part of Yankees' lore when his home run decides the 1976 American League Championship Series and enables the Bombers to capture their first pennant since 1964.
- April 29 – Lee May goes five-for-five with two homers and four runs batted in, leading his Houston Astros to an 18–2 shellacking of the Chicago Cubs at the Astrodome.
- April 30 – At Fenway Park, Nolan Ryan of the California Angels strikes out 19 Boston Red Sox batters in a 4–2 victory. In a frightening moment, he hits second baseman Doug Griffin in the head with a fastball. Griffin will be sidelined for two months.

=== May ===
Sadaharu Oh (2023)

- May 1 – Dock Ellis of the Pittsburgh Pirates hits three consecutive batters with pitches in the first inning, setting an ML record, and walks another in the frame before being lifted. Pittsburgh loses 5–3 to the Cincinnati Reds.
- May 4 – Boston Red Sox shortstop Rick Burleson, a future four-time AL All-Star and winner of a Gold Glove Award, ties a major league record by committing three errors in his major league debut.
- May 15 – The Los Angeles Dodgers sweep a doubleheader against the visiting Houston Astros, 11–7 and 10–2, to stretch their winning streak to nine games. At 27–9 overall, Los Angeles has built a 7½-game lead in the National League West.
- May 22:
  - The Baltimore Orioles' Ross Grimsley throws a 12-inning, complete game shutout to defeat the Cleveland Indians 1–0 at Baltimore Memorial Stadium. Paul Blair singles home Enos Cabell for the game's only run.
  - The New York Mets purchase the contract of catcher Alex Trevino from Ciudad Victoria from the Class-A Mexican Center League.
- May 29 – Bob Short, who bought the Washington Senators in December 1968, then moved them to Dallas–Fort Worth as the Texas Rangers three years later, sells the team to Fort Worth entrepreneur Brad Corbett.
- May 30 – Sadaharu Oh becomes the first player in Nippon Professional Baseball to hit 600 home runs. Only Babe Ruth, Hank Aaron and Willie Mays are ahead of Oh among U.S. players at this time, but he will surpass them all.

=== June ===
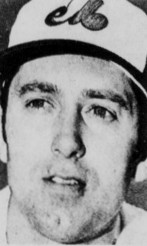
Mike Marshall (1973)

- June 4 – The Cleveland Indians attempt an ill-advised ten cent beer promotion for a game against the Texas Rangers at Cleveland Municipal Stadium. Cleveland forfeits 9–0 after alcohol-fueled mayhem and violence spreads from the stands onto the field.
- June 5 – Hank Aaron hits his 16th career grand slam homer as the Braves top the Phillies, 7–3, in Philadelphia.
- June 10 – The Philadelphia Phillies' Mike Schmidt hits the ball off the speaker at the Houston Astrodome, turning a sure homer into one of the longest singles hit in a 12–0 Phillies victory over the Houston Astros.
- June 11:
  - Mel Stottlemyre of the New York Yankees makes his 272nd consecutive start, with no relief appearances, to set an American League record.
  - The Kansas City Royals shake up their front office, replacing Cedric Tallis, the only general manager the team has had since its founding in 1968, with Joe Burke. Previously general manager of the Texas Rangers, the 50-year-old Burke joined the Royals' front office after the 1973 season.
- June 14:
  - At Anaheim Stadium, California Angels pitcher Nolan Ryan pitches 13 innings, and strikes out 19 batters, including Boston Red Sox first baseman Cecil Cooper, who alone fans six straight times. The Angels defeat Boston 4–3 in 15 innings. Boston starter Luis Tiant goes 141/3 and absorbs the loss when Denny Doyle doubles home speedy Mickey Rivers.
  - The New York Yankees purchase the contract of Angels' pitcher Rudy May. The 29-year-old left-hander will go 8–4 (2.28 ERA) in 15 starts with eight complete games and two shutouts to help the Yankees finish a strong second in the American League East.
- June 18 – Bobby Grich homers three times and knocks in six runs, leading his Baltimore Orioles to a 10–1 triumph over the Minnesota Twins at Memorial Stadium.
- June 19 – George Scott, who walks to lead off the second inning, is the Milwaukee Brewers' only base runner as Steve Busby of the Kansas City Royals hurls a 2–0 no-hitter. Busby is the first major league pitcher to throw no-hitters in his first two seasons.
- June 23 – The Los Angeles Dodgers defeat the visiting San Francisco Giants 4–3 to sweep a three-game series. Relief ace Mike Marshall is the winning pitcher in all three games, improving his record to 7–3 (2.25 ERA) with nine saves; he has appeared in 46 of the Dodgers' 70 games, en route to the MLB all-time record for games pitched in a season (106).
- June 24 – Steve Busby of the Kansas City Royals retires the first nine batters he faces to set an American League record with 33 consecutive batsmen retired. The Royals lose, however, 3–1 to the Chicago White Sox.
- June 25 – At Jarry Park Stadium, Steve Renko of the Montreal Expos fires a one-hitter to defeat the Philadelphia Phillies 5–0 behind Bob Bailey's grand slam home run. Dave Cash's sixth-inning single is the Phils' lone hit.
- June 27:
  - Two-time (1972, 1973) World Series-winning manager Dick Williams returns to baseball, signing a three-year contract as field leader of the California Angels. Six months earlier, Williams had been blocked by Oakland Athletics owner Charles O. Finley and former American League president Joe Cronin from managing the New York Yankees, because he was still considered under contract with Oakland when he quit the Athletics after leading them to the 1973 world championship. In a surprise, Finley does not demand compensation from Angel owner Gene Autry, a division rival, freeing Williams to sign with the Halos. Williams will replace Bobby Winkles, fired earlier today with the Angels 30–44, sixth (and last) in the AL West and 11 games behind Finley's first-place Athletics.
  - Three years after being named 1971 Manager of the Year, Charlie Fox is fired as pilot of the San Francisco Giants, who are 34–42, fifth in the National League West and 16½ games behind the Los Angeles Dodgers. Coach Wes Westrum, 51, stalwart catcher of the 1950s New York Giants, replaces Fox.
- June 28:
  - Off to a strong start to 1974 (.299, 11 homers, .934 OPS in 52 games), catcher Carlton Fisk of the Boston Red Sox sustains a season-ending knee injury when he violently collides with baserunner Leron Lee of the Indians at home plate in the ninth inning of a game at Cleveland Stadium. To rub salt into the Red Sox's wounds, Lee's run is the winning tally in a 2–1 Tribe triumph. The Red Sox are 40–31, in first place in the American League East when Fisk goes down; they finish 1974 at 84–78, a distant third behind the Baltimore Orioles and New York Yankees.
  - In the first game of a twi-night doubleheader, the Chicago Cubs and Montreal Expos go 18 innings and 4:55 at Jarry Park Stadium before the Cubs emerge victorious 8–7 behind Jerry Morales' RBI triple. The late-night second game sees Montreal rout the Cubs 15–0 behind Dennis Blair's two-hitter.

=== July ===
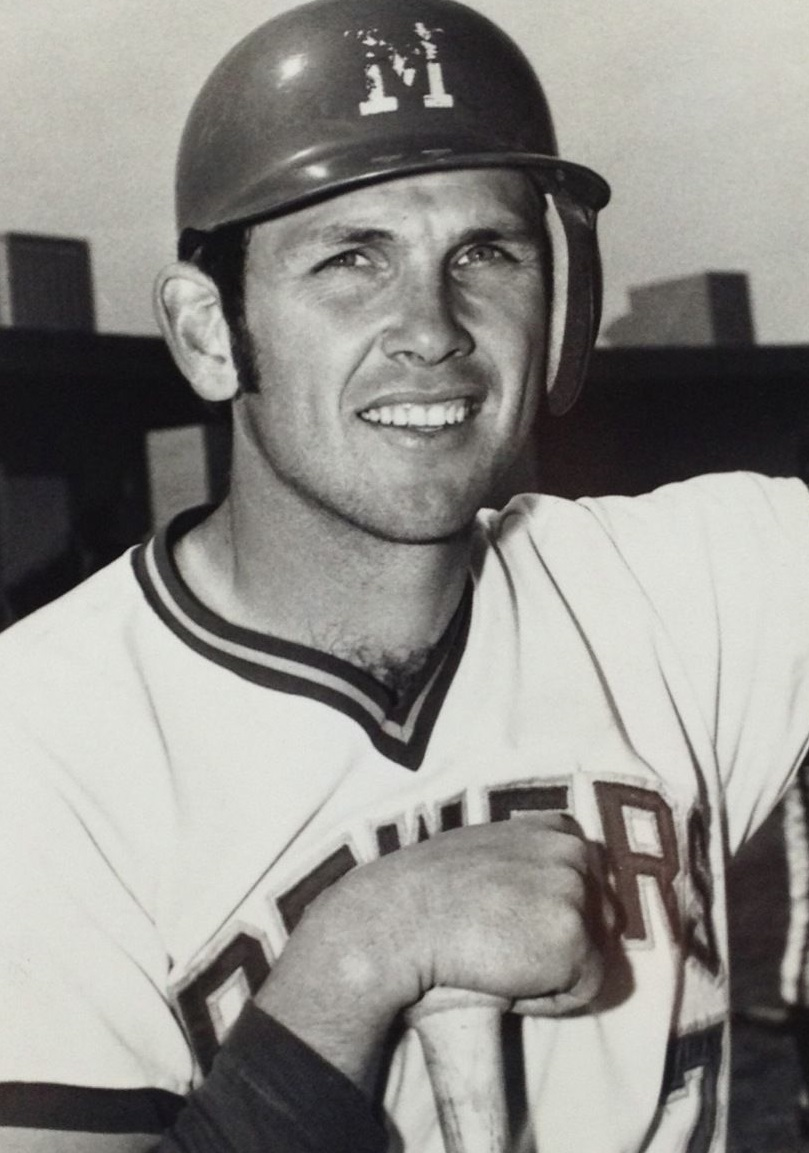
Don Money

- July 4 – At the traditional half-way point of the MLB season, the Los Angeles Dodgers (55–25, with a run differential of +144) hold a commanding 9½-game advantage over the runner-up Cincinnati Reds in the National League West. But the other three division races are tighter: in the NL East, the St. Louis Cardinals (41–36) lead the Montreal Expos by 2½ games; in the American League West, the defending world champion Oakland Athletics (45–35) hold a 4½-game advantage over the Kansas City Royals and Texas Rangers; and in the AL East, all six teams are within striking distance of first place, with the Boston Red Sox (43–35) a half-game in front of the Cleveland Indians (42–35).
- July 9 – During the first three innings at Wrigley Field, the Cincinnati Reds build a 5–0 lead over the Chicago Cubs on the strength of five solo home runs. Finally, in the sixth inning, George Foster connects with two men on base to build the Reds' lead to 8–1. Cincinnati holds on to win, 8–5.
- July 11 – The San Diego Padres release outfielder Matty Alou. Alou's brother Felipe was released by the Milwaukee Brewers on April 29. Younger brother Jesús keeps the Alou name alive in the majors, playing for the Oakland Athletics.
- July 14 – In a doubleheader with the Brewers, the Rangers' Billy Martin is the first American League manager to be removed by umpires from two games in one day.
- July 17:
  - Bob Gibson of the St. Louis Cardinals strikes out César Gerónimo of the Cincinnati Reds to become the second pitcher to strike out 3,000 batters in the majors. Gerónimo will become Nolan Ryan's 3,000th strikeout victim six years later.
  - Milwaukee third baseman Don Money commits a first-inning error in a 10–5 loss to Minnesota, ending his perfect defensive season after 86 games and 257 chances. He will end the season with just five errors, breaking George Kell's record set in 1950. Money also holds the National League record with just 10 errors, set with the Phillies in 1972, and holds both the National League and American League records for most consecutive chances without an error in a season.
  - Los Angeles Dodgers pitcher Tommy John, who started the season 13–3, has his season come to an abrupt end when he tears a ligament in his pitching elbow in a 5–4 loss to the Montreal Expos.
  - Baseball mourns Dizzy Dean, 64, Hall of Fame pitching star of the 1930s St. Louis Cardinals, and, since the 1940s, a legendary broadcaster who was even the subject of a 1951 biopic. (See Deaths entry for this date below.)
- July 19 – Dick Bosman of the Cleveland Indians no-hits the Oakland Athletics 4–0. Bosman has no one but himself to blame for not picking up a rare perfect game. His throwing error in the fourth inning puts the only A's runner (Sal Bando) on base. The two clubs combine to set an American League record with two runners left on base.
- July 21 – The Atlanta Braves fire manager Eddie Mathews, a Hall of Fame third baseman and the only man to have played for the Braves in Boston (1952), Milwaukee (1953–1965) and Atlanta (1966). Mathews has managed the Braves to a 149–161–1 record since August 7, 1972. Assistant general manager Clyde King moves from the front office to Atlanta's managerial chair after the All-Star break on July 25.
- July 23 – The National League triumphs in the All-Star Game at Pittsburgh, winning 7–2 over the American League. Steve Garvey is named the MVP.
- July 24 – Whitey Lockman, manager of the Chicago Cubs since July 27, 1972, steps down to resume his former job as director of player development. Coach Jim Marshall replaces him. Lockman went 157–162 (.492) at the Cubs' helm.
- July 25 – Carl Yastrzemski hits his 300th career home run helping the Boston Red Sox beat the Detroit Tigers 12–4.

=== August ===
Davey Lopes sliding home in 1976

- August 1 – The resurgent Philadelphia Phillies (54–50) begin the month tied for first place in the National League East with the St. Louis Cardinals. The Phillies have not enjoyed a winning season since 1967, and have lost 90 or more games in four of the past six campaigns.
- August 4 – Dave Freisleben of the San Diego Padres throws 13 shutout innings—and 230 pitches—against the visiting Cincinnati Reds in the second game of a doubleheader. But he leaves the game while it's still a scoreless tie, and doesn't earn the victory when San Diego pushes across a run in the home half of the 14th.
- August 6:
  - Johnny Bench hits his 200th career home run helping the Cincinnati Reds beat the Los Angeles Dodgers 6–3. With 50 games left in the regular season, the Reds now trail the Dodgers by 6½ games in the National League West.
  - Juan Marichal, wearing the unfamiliar uniform of the Boston Red Sox, improves his record to 4–1 by allowing only two hits over seven scoreless innings and defeating the Milwaukee Brewers, 6–0, at Milwaukee County Stadium. Hall-of-Famer Marichal, 36, will go 5–1 for the 1974 Red Sox, but appear in only 11 games all season and post a poor 4.87 ERA. Boston will release him on October 24.
- August 7 – The Detroit Tigers continue to shed veteran stars. They release Norm Cash, 40, the Tigers' regular first baseman since 1960. Then they sell the contract of outfielder Jim Northrup, 34, to the Montreal Expos.
- August 12 – Nolan Ryan of the California Angels strikes out 19 in a 4–2 victory over the Boston Red Sox.
- August 15 – The St. Louis Cardinals, who lead their division by 1½ games, bolster their pitching staff by acquiring veteran southpaw Claude Osteen from the Houston Astros.
- August 20 – Davey Lopes sets a Dodgers record when he totals 15 bases against the Cubs in an 18–8 drubbing at Wrigley Field. Lopes has three home runs, a double and a single in his team's 24-hit attack. The Dodgers totaled 48 bases in the game, a team record.
- August 21 – Fanning 12 hitters, slender southpaw Rogelio Moret of the Boston Red Sox one-hits the Chicago White Sox at Fenway Park, 4–0. Dick Allen's seventh-inning infield single is the White Sox's lone safety. After the game, Boston owner Tom Yawkey gives Moret a $1,000 raise.
- August 25 – The Pittsburgh Pirates recover from their terrible start to 1974 (they were 39–49 as late as July 15) to gain first place in the NL East by sweeping a doubleheader at San Diego Stadium, 4–1 (12 innings) and 10–2.
- August 27 – Hal McRae of the Kansas City Royals ties a Major League record with six extra base hits (five doubles and a home run).
- August 30:
  - In his major debut, Keith Hernandez of the St. Louis Cardinals goes 1 for 2 in four plate appearances. He drives in Bake McBride in the top of the 9th in St. Louis' 8–2 loss to the San Francisco Giants.
  - Texas Rangers player Dave Nelson steals three bases – 2nd, 3rd and home in the first inning against the Cleveland Indians.

=== September ===
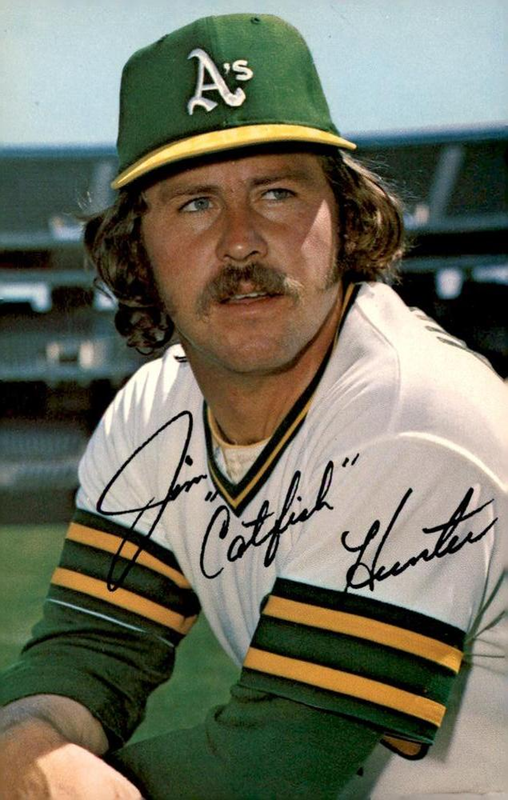
Catfish Hunter

- September 1 – The St. Louis Cardinals sell the contact of catcher Tim McCarver to the Boston Red Sox.
- September 2:
  - At Memorial Stadium, the third-place Baltimore Orioles sweep a Labor Day doubleheader against the division-leading Boston Red Sox with twin 1–0 shutouts authored by left-handers Ross Grimsley and Mike Cuellar. The Birds' pitchers allow only five hits, all singles, and send the reeling Red Sox to their fifth and sixth straight defeats.
  - By the day's end, three of the four MLB pennant races are tight. Only the American League West is the exception, with the two-time defending World Series champion Oakland Athletics (78–57) holding an 81/2-game advantage over the Kansas City Royals (69–65) and Texas Rangers (70–66). In the National League, the second-place Cincinnati Reds (81–54) have narrowed the 84–50 Los Angeles Dodgers' lead in the West to 31/2 games, while the surging Pittsburgh Pirates (72–63) hold a 21/2-game advantage over the St. Louis Cardinals (69–65) in the NL East. In the American League East, the 72–62 Red Sox' struggles have shrunk their margin to one game over the New York Yankees (71–63) and three over the Orioles (69–65).
- September 3 – In a memorable performance, the San Francisco Giants' John Montefusco makes his major league debut, hits a home run in his first official at bat (off Charlie Hough), and pitches nine innings of relief to earn a 9–5 victory over the Los Angeles Dodgers.
- September 4:
  - Pitcher Don Wilson has a no-hitter through eight innings, but is pulled from the game by Houston Astros manager Preston Gómez. Reliever Mike Cosgrove gives up a leadoff single to Tony Pérez, and the Astros lose to the Cincinnati Reds, 2–1. Gómez had made the same mistake in San Diego on July 21, 1970. Then, the Padres' Clay Kirby had a no-hitter going for eight innings, but with two outs in the eighth and trailing 1–0, Gómez lifted him for pinch hitter Cito Gaston. Gaston failed to get a hit, reliever Jack Baldschun gave up two runs in the ninth, and the Padres lost 3–0.
  - After rain washes out their Tuesday game, the Baltimore Orioles and Boston Red Sox resume their three-game series. But it's the same old story for Boston. The Orioles' Jim Palmer tosses a three-hitter and shuts out the Red Sox 6–0. The Red Sox are blanked for the third straight time and extend their losing streak to seven games.
- September 7 – During a 3–1 win over the Chicago White Sox, Nolan Ryan of the California Angels has a fastball clocked at 100.8 miles (162.2 km) per hour — the fastest pitch recorded to that point.
- September 8 – Pat Pieper ends his 59-year career as public address announcer for the Chicago Cubs.
- September 10 – The St. Louis Cardinals' Lou Brock ties and breaks Maury Wills' MLB record by stealing his 104th and 105th bases of the season. The thefts also give Brock 740 career stolen bases, breaking Max Carey's National League record of 738.
- September 11 – The St. Louis Cardinals win a marathon night game against the New York Mets at Shea Stadium, after seven hours four minutes, and 25 innings, the longest game to a decision in major league history. The Cardinals, trailing 3–1 with two out in the ninth, tie the score on Ken Reitz' two-run home run off Jerry Koosman, sending the game into extra innings. Two Mets errors lead to the Cardinals' winning run, starting with an errant pickoff throw that allows Bake McBride to scamper all the way around from first. St. Louis wins, 4–3. The Mets go to the plate 103 times, the only time the century mark has been reached in a major league game; the Cards are not far behind with 99 plate appearances. All told, a record 175 official at-bats are recorded, with a major-league record 45 runners stranded. Only a thousand fans are on hand when the game ends at 3:13 a.m.
- September 12:
  - The Cleveland Indians (71–71 and fourth in the American League East) acquire future Hall-of-Fame slugger Frank Robinson, 39, from the California Angels for catcher Ken Suarez, outfielder Rusty Torres ("PTBNL") and cash. Speculation immediately begins that Cleveland plans to appoint Robinson as the first Black manager in MLB history.
  - Tigers pitcher John Hiller picks up his 17th victory in relief, an American League record, as he beats the Brewers, 9–7.
- September 15 – Rico Petrocelli, veteran third baseman of the Boston Red Sox, is struck in the head by a pitch from Jim Slaton of the Milwaukee Brewers, ending Petrocelli's season. The Red Sox, meanwhile, continue their skid out of contention in the American League East, and fall 31/2 games behind the New York Yankees. The beaning leads to inner-ear problems that shorten Petrocelli's career.
- September 19 – At Shea Stadium, the Baltimore Orioles complete a three-game sweep of the New York Yankees, 3–0, behind Dave McNally's three-hitter and a homer from Don Baylor, and take over first place in the American League East. The Orioles are in the midst of a 25–6 closing kick that will see them win their fifth division title in six seasons.
- September 24:
  - Future Hall-of-Famer Al Kaline of the Detroit Tigers doubles for his 3,000th career hit, but his Tigers lose to the Orioles, 5–4. Kaline, 39, is in his 22nd and final season with the Tigers; the 18-time All-Star and 10x Gold Glove Award-winner will retire with 3,007 career safeties.
  - Clarence Jones of the Kintetsu Buffaloes hits his 38th home run to become the first foreign player to win a home run title in Nippon Professional Baseball, topping the Pacific League. Sadaharu Oh will lead the Central League with 49 homers. Jones will lead the Pacific League again with 36 HR in 1976.
- September 25 – Dodgers left-hander Tommy John undergoes surgery to repair the ulnar collateral ligament in his pitching elbow. The surgery, performed by Frank Jobe, will be named after the pitcher.
- September 26 – The American League West division race is settled when the first-place Oakland Athletics defeat the Minnesota Twins 2–1 behind Catfish Hunter's 25th win of the season, and the runner-up Texas Rangers drop a doubleheader to the Chicago White Sox. It's Oakland's fourth straight division title.
- September 27 – The Baltimore Orioles maintain their half-game division lead over the New York Yankees with a 17-inning, 1–0 triumph over the visiting Milwaukee Brewers. Jim Palmer throws 12 scoreless innings.
- September 28:
  - In his last start of the year, Nolan Ryan of the California Angels pitches his third career no-hitter, victimizing the Minnesota Twins, 4–0. In the process, Ryan strikes out 15 batters for the sixth time this season. He also walks eight to run his season total to 202 bases on balls, joining Bob Feller in 1938 as the only pitcher to walk more than 200 in a season. Ryan will set a personal high issuing 204 walks in 1977.
  - Don Wilson of the Houston Astros throws a 5–0, two-hit shutout against the Braves. It will be Wilson's last major league game, followed by his accidental death on January 5, 1975.

=== October ===
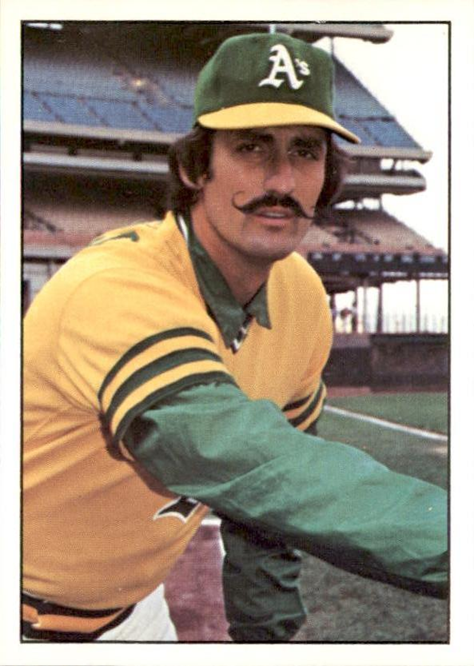
Rollie Fingers

- October 1:
  - The Los Angeles Dodgers clinch the National League West championship after learning that the Atlanta Braves had downed the Cincinnati Reds, 7–1, eliminating the Reds from the postseason.
  - The Baltimore Orioles clinch the American League East when they defeat the Detroit Tigers 7–6 and the Milwaukee Brewers end the New York Yankees' Cinderella season with a 3–2 win. The Yankees fall short of the title after going 20–11 since September 1.
  - Bob Scheffing, 61, retires as general manager of the New York Mets after five seasons in the job. His successor is Joe McDonald, 45, a member of the club's front-office staff since its 1962 debut season and most recently director of minor league operations.
- October 2:
  - The Pittsburgh Pirates claim the National League East championship on the 1974 season's final day with a 5–4, ten-inning victory over the Chicago Cubs at Three Rivers Stadium. Manny Sanguillen's game-winning hit enables the Bucs to edge the St. Louis Cardinals by 11/2 games.
  - Hank Aaron hits his 733rd, and final, home run in a Milwaukee/Atlanta Braves' uniform. The blow comes off Rawly Eastwick of the Cincinnati Reds in the seventh inning of a 13–0 season-ending triumph at Atlanta–Fulton County Stadium. The 40-year-old Aaron will belt a total of 22 homers in 1975–1976, principally spent as the DH of the Milwaukee Brewers.
- October 3 – Frank Robinson becomes the first black manager in major league history, as the Cleveland Indians name him to replace Ken Aspromonte for the 1975 season. Robinson, with 574 career homers to his credit, will be Cleveland's DH as well as manager.
- October 9 – The American and National League pennants are decided on the same day, when each League Championship Series ends in four games. At Baltimore Memorial Stadium, the Oakland Athletics win their third straight AL pennant by defeating the Baltimore Orioles, 2–1, behind Catfish Hunter. Reggie Jackson doubles home the decisive run. In Los Angeles, the Dodgers win the franchise's first NL flag since 1966, drubbing the Pittsburgh Pirates 12–1, riding Steve Garvey's two homers and four RBI to victory. Don Sutton breezes through eight innings to gain the win.
- October 13 – The New York Mets acquire veteran first baseman Joe Torre, 34, from the St. Louis Cardinals for two pitchers, ex-Redbird Ray Sadecki and Tommy Moore. Torre will become the Mets' player-manager on May 31, 1977.
- October 14 – The Cardinals remain active on the trading front, obtaining relief pitcher Elias Sosa and backup catcher Ken Rudolph from the San Francisco Giants for young receiver Marc Hill. In a separate deal, they also send infielder Tom Heintzelman to the Giants for hurler Jim Willoughby.
- October 17 – At the Oakland Coliseum, the Athletics win the World Series over the Los Angeles Dodgers in Game 5, clinching a third straight world championship and the eighth in their 74-year history. Reliever Rollie Fingers is named the Series MVP.
- October 22 – In a blockbuster, one-for-one deal, the New York Yankees trade outfielder Bobby Murcer to the San Francisco Giants for outfielder Bobby Bonds.
- October 23:
  - Wally Yonamine, an American of Japanese descent, becomes the only non-Japanese manager to win the Japan Series when his Chunichi Dragons beat the Lotte Orions.
  - The Chicago Cubs continue to dismantle their late-1960s contenders, trading future Hall-of-Famer and eight-time All-Star outfielder Billy Williams, 36, to the world-champion Oakland Athletics for pitchers Darold Knowles and Bob Locker and young second baseman Manny Trillo.
  - The Athletics also trade outfield prospect Dan Ford and a minor-league pitcher to the Minnesota Twins for backup first baseman Pat Bourque.
- October 24 – Billy Martin is named the Associated Press American League Manager of the Year after leading his Texas Rangers to a second-place finish in the AL West.
- October 30 – Catfish Hunter of the World Series champion Oakland Athletics (41 games started, 3181/3 innings pitched, 25–12 win–loss record, 2.49 earned run average, 23 complete games, six shutouts) wins his only American League Cy Young Award.

=== November ===
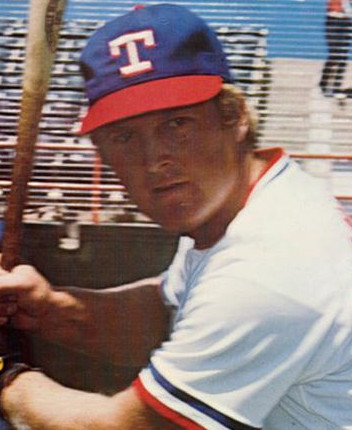
Jeff Burroughs

- November 2 – The Atlanta Braves trade Hank Aaron to the Milwaukee Brewers for outfielder Dave May and a minor league pitcher. Aaron will finish his major league career in Milwaukee, where he started it in 1954. Meanwhile, Aaron, the home run king of American baseball, and Sadaharu Oh, his Japanese counterpart, square off for a home run contest at Korakuen Stadium. Aaron wins 10–9.
- November 6 – Mike Marshall of the Los Angeles Dodgers wins the National League Cy Young Award—the first relief pitcher to do so. Marshall has just shattered his own MLB record for games pitched in a season, with 106. He went 15–12 (2.66) and led NL hurlers in games finished (83, a new MLB record) and saves (21).
- November 8 – The San Diego Padres trade outfielder Cito Gaston to the Braves for pitcher Danny Frisella. Gaston is an "original Padre," selected by San Diego (from Atlanta) in the 1968 NL expansion draft.
- November 13 – Los Angeles Dodgers first baseman Steve Garvey wins the National League Most Valuable Player Award. Garvey, 25, collected 200 hits, 111 runs batted in, his first All-Star nod, and the first of his four straight Gold Glove Awards during 1974.
- November 18 – San Diego makes two more headline deals. In the first, it trades another original Padre, slugger and three-time former All-Star Nate Colbert, to the Detroit Tigers for veteran shortstop Ed Brinkman and two other players. The Padres then ship Brinkman to the St. Louis Cardinals for three pitchers, Rich Folkers, Alan Foster and Sonny Siebert, and reserve catcher Danny Breeden ("PTBNL").
- November 20 – Texas Rangers right fielder Jeff Burroughs, who batted .301 with 25 home runs and a league-leading 118 RBI, wins the American League MVP Award. Oakland teammates Joe Rudi, Sal Bando and Reggie Jackson are the runners-up.
- November 25 – Rangers first baseman Mike Hargrove, who hit .323 with 66 RBI and a .395 OBP, is voted American League Rookie of the Year with 16 of 23 first place votes, with the others going to Bucky Dent (3), George Brett (2), Rick Burleson (1) and Jim Sundberg (1).
- November 27:
  - St. Louis Cardinals center fielder Bake McBride, who hit .309 with six home runs and 56 RBI, wins the National League Rookie of the Year Award over Greg Gross (.314, 21 2B, 36 RBI) and Bill Madlock (.313, 9 HR, 54 RBI).
  - Commissioner Bowie Kuhn suspends New York Yankees owner George Steinbrenner for two years as a result of Steinbrenner's conviction for illegal campaign contributions to Richard Nixon and other politicians.

=== December ===
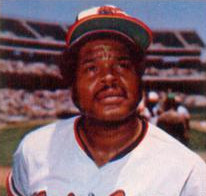
Lee May

- December 2 – The Boston Red Sox trade speedy outfielder Tommy Harper to the California Angels for infielder Bob Heise. With the Red Sox' surplus of outfielders, the trade helps pave the way for the 1975 debuts of rookies Jim Rice and Fred Lynn.
- December 3:
  - The New York Mets trade ace reliever and Shea Stadium favorite Tug McGraw to the Philadelphia Phillies along with outfielders Don Hahn and Dave Schneck. New York receives outfielder Del Unser, pitcher Mac Scarce and catcher John Stearns, whom the Phillies had drafted #2 overall in the 1973 Major League Baseball draft.
  - The Chicago White Sox deal veteran slugger Dick Allen to the Atlanta Braves for cash and a "player to be named later," who becomes catcher Jim Essian.
  - The Baltimore Orioles acquire first baseman Lee May and outfielder Jay Schlueter from the Houston Astros for infielders Enos Cabell and Rob Andrews.
- December 4:
  - The Orioles pull off another major interleague trade, sending veteran southpaw Dave McNally, outfielder Rich Coggins and a minor-leaguer to the Montreal Expos for pitcher Mike Torrez and outfielder Ken Singleton. McNally, who went 181–113 in 14 years as an Oriole, including four straight 20+-win seasons, will struggle in Montreal in 1975. But he will gain added fame when he joins Dodger pitcher Andy Messersmith in challenging baseball's reserve clause in a case that, ultimately, overturns it in December 1975.
  - The Expos also add another veteran lefty, when they acquire Woodie Fryman from the Detroit Tigers for pitcher Tom Walker and catcher Terry Humphrey.
- December 5 – Making their third significant interleague trade in two days, the Expos send starting centerfielder Willie Davis, 34, to the Texas Rangers for pitcher Don Stanhouse and infielder Pete Mackanin, both 23. Davis, former NL All-Star and three-time Gold Glove Award-winner as a Dodger, had a strong year offensively (180 hits, 89 runs batted in, .295 average, in 153 games played) in 1974, his lone season with Montreal.
- December 26 – The Little League is officially opened to girls as President Gerald Ford signs legislation amending the charter of the organization. Little League had sought changes in their charter after a series of lawsuits challenged its boys-only rule.
- December 31 – After earning his freedom through arbitration over missed insurance payments by the Oakland Athletics, Jim "Catfish" Hunter is signed by the New York Yankees to a $3.75 million contract—which is slightly more than triple the next-highest salary in the game.

== Births ==
=== January ===
- January 1 – Kevin Beirne
- January 5:
  - Damon Minor
  - Ryan Minor
  - Mark Redman
- January 6 – Marlon Anderson
- January 7 – Rob Radlosky
- January 11:
  - Cody McKay
  - Warren Morris
- January 14 – Mike Frank
- January 15 – Ray King
- January 19 – Amaury Telemaco
- January 23:
  - Erubiel Durazo
  - Mark Watson
- January 25 – Dan Serafini
- January 27 – Bryant Nelson
- January 28:
  - Jermaine Dye
  - Oscar Henríquez
  - Magglio Ordóñez

=== February ===
- February 7 – Adrian Brown
- February 11 – Trey Beamon
- February 13 – Howie Clark
- February 15 – Ugueth Urbina
- February 16 – Luis Figueroa
- February 18 – Jamey Carroll
- February 19 – Juan Díaz
- February 20 – Tom Fordham
- February 24 – Mike Lowell
- February 25 – Shannon Stewart
- February 27 – Cliff Politte

=== March ===
- March 2 – Anthony Sanders
- March 4 – Tommy Phelps
- March 6:
  - Gabe Alvarez
  - James Lofton
- March 8 – Mike Moriarty
- March 9:
  - Adán Amezcua
  - Wayne Franklin
  - Francisco Santos
  - Brodie Van Wagenen
- March 11 – Bobby Abreu
- March 12 – Craig Dingman
- March 15 – Robert Fick
- March 19:
  - Rocky Coppinger
  - Jason LaRue
- March 22 – Jason Phillips
- March 24:
  - Jamie Arnoldd
  - Jim Rushford
- March 28 – Ryan Christenson

=== April ===
- April 3 – Jim Pittsley
- April 6 – Danny Clyburn
- April 8 – Eddie Priest
- April 11 – Trot Nixon
- April 15 – Reynaldo Garcia
- April 19 – José Cruz Jr.
- April 21 – Cliff Brumbaugh
- April 24 – Will Cunnane
- April 27:
  - Frank Catalanotto
  - Steve Connelly
- April 29:
  - Héctor Mercado
  - Tony Saunders

=== May ===
- May 1 – Stephen Randolph
- May 4 – Miguel Cairo
- May 10 – Bob Smith
- May 13 – Shigeki Noguchi
- May 14 – Jim Crowell
- May 15 – A. J. Hinch
- May 16 – Jerrod Riggan
- May 17 – Wiki González
- May 18:
  - Nelson Figueroa
  - Félix Martínez Mata
- May 20 – Brian McNichol
- May 21 – Mark Quinn
- May 22 – John Bale
- May 24 – Masahide Kobayashi
- May 25 – Miguel Tejada

=== June ===
- June 4:
  - Trace Coquillette
  - Darin Erstad
- June 5 – Russ Ortiz
- June 7 – Chris Richard
- June 9:
  - Scarborough Green
  - Randy Winn
- June 12:
  - Damon Hollins
  - Hideki Matsui
- June 13 – Brian Sweeney
- June 15 – Chris Wakeland
- June 18 – Carlos Méndez
- June 19 – Doug Mientkiewicz
- June 21 – Sean Runyan
- June 23 – Mark Hendrickson
- June 24 – Chris Guccione
- June 26:
  - Derek Jeter
  - Jason Kendall
- June 27 – Andy Larkin

=== July ===
- July 2 – Sean Casey
- July 4 – Jeff Harris
- July 8 – Danny Ardoin
- July 9 – Tom Evans
- July 16 – Jonathan Johnson
- July 19 – Preston Wilson
- July 20 – Bengie Molina
- July 21:
  - Brett Hinchliffe
  - Geoff Jenkins
- July 23 – Larry Barnes
- July 27 – Brian Sikorski

=== August ===
- August 1 – Justin Baughman
- August 2 – Matt Miller
- August 6:
  - Chris Heintz
  - Luis Vizcaíno
- August 9 – Matt Morris
- August 12:
  - Matt Clement
  - Shane Monahan
- August 13:
  - Scott MacRae
  - Jarrod Washburn
- August 15 – Ramón Morel
- August 16:
  - Roger Cedeño
  - John Snyder
- August 17 – Jeff Liefer
- August 18:
  - Jayson Durocher
  - Chris Stowers
- August 19 – Brian Cooper
- August 23:
  - Mark Bellhorn
  - Bobby Estalella
  - Alejandro Freire
- August 24:
  - Bartolomé Fortunato
  - Jeff Kubenka
- August 25:
  - Gary Matthews Jr.
  - Pablo Ozuna
- August 27 – José Vidro
- August 30 – Kris Foster

=== September ===
- September 5 – Calvin Maduro
- September 14 – Chad Bradford
- September 21 – Manuel Barrios
- September 23 – Eric Knott
- September 24 – John McDonald
- September 25 – Rich Hunter
- September 27 – Radhames Dykhoff
- September 30 – Jeremy Giambi

=== October ===
- October 2:
  - Brian Knight
  - Doug Nickle
- October 3 – Alex Ramírez
- October 6 – Matt Duff
- October 9 – Courtney Duncan
- October 10 – Luther Hackman
- October 11:
  - Mike Duvall
  - Jesús Sánchez
- October 14 – Erik Sabel
- October 17:
  - Curt Lyons
  - Luis Pineda
  - John Rocker
- October 24 – Wilton Guerrero
- October 25 – Joe Nelson
- October 26 – Marty McLeary
- October 27 – Denny Stark
- October 28 – Braden Looper
- October 29 – R. A. Dickey
- October 31 – Steve Cox

=== November ===
- November 1 – Ryan Glynn
- November 2:
  - Orlando Cabrera
- José Fernández
- November 4 – Carlos Mendoza
- November 5 – José Santiago
- November 7:
  - Kris Benson
  - Glendon Rusch
- November 9:
  - Jeff D'Amico
  - Beiker Graterol
  - José Rosado
- November 10 – Micah Bowie
- November 16 – Mark Corey
- November 17 – Jim Mann
- November 19:
  - John Roskos
  - Mario Valdez
- November 22 – Joe Nathan
- November 27 – Ken Ray

=== December ===
- December 4 – Tadahito Iguchi
- December 5 – Ken Vining
- December 7 – Mike Bell
- December 12 – Julius Matos
- December 14 – Billy Koch
- December 18:
  - Lance Carter
  - José Rodríguez
- December 20 – Augie Ojeda
- December 22 – Trevor Enders
- December 23 – Pascual Matos
- December 24:
  - Keith Luuloa
  - Kevin Millwood
  - Jamey Wright
- December 26:
  - Brian Fitzgerald
  - Corey Lee
- December 27 – Nate Bland
- December 29:
  - Emil Brown
  - Richie Sexson

== Deaths ==
=== January ===
- January 1 – Jimmy Smith, 78, switch-hitting utility infielder who began his career with the Chicago Whales and Baltimore Terrapins of the "outlaw" Federal League, then bounced among five National League clubs: the Pittsburgh Pirates, New York Giants, Boston Braves, Cincinnati Reds (where he was a member of the 1919 World Series champions) and Philadelphia Phillies; appeared in 360 games over eight seasons (1914–1919, 1921–1922).
- January 2 – Gordon Slade, 69, infielder who appeared in 437 career games for the Brooklyn Robins/Dodgers, St. Louis Cardinals and Cincinnati Reds between 1930 and 1935.
- January 12:
  - Frank E. McKinney, 69, Indiana banker and political figure who was principal owner of the Pittsburgh Pirates from August 8, 1946, to July 18, 1950; longtime owner of his hometown team, the Triple-A Indianapolis Indians.
  - Jim Middleton, 84, pitcher who worked in 51 MLB games for the 1917 New York Giants and 1921 Detroit Tigers.
  - Joe Smith, 80, catcher who appeared in 14 games for the 1913 New York Yankees.
- January 14:
  - Lloyd Brown, 69, left-handed pitcher who won 46 games for the 1930–1932 Washington Senators and also played with the Brooklyn Robins, St. Louis Browns, Boston Red Sox, Cleveland Indians and Philadelphia Phillies over 12 seasons between 1925 and 1940; later, a scout.
  - Jay Partridge, 71, second baseman for the 1927–1928 Brooklyn Robins who appeared in 183 games.
- January 17 – Archie Hinton, 47, pitcher, third baseman and shortstop who played 25 games for the Baltimore Elite Giants of the Negro National League in 1944 and 1945.
- January 18:
  - Pete Appleton, 69, relief pitcher for seven teams over 14 seasons between 1927 and 1945, who won 14 games for the 1936 Washington Senators; longtime scout for the Washington/Minnesota Twins franchise; known by his birth name, Jablonowski, until 1934, when he legally changed it.
  - Thomas Healy, 78, third baseman who appeared in 29 total games for the hapless 1915–1916 Philadelphia Athletics.
- January 20:
  - Homer Hillebrand, 94, first baseman and left-handed pitcher for the Pittsburgh Pirates (1905–1906, 1908); Princeton grad compiled a won–lost mark of 8–4 and a 2.51 ERA in 18 games and 1141/3 innings pitched and batted .237 in 131 at bats at the plate over 47 total MLB games.
  - George Hockette, 72, pitcher for the Boston Red Sox in the mid-1930s.
- January 21 – Claude Cooper, 81, outfielder who appeared in 373 career games for the 1913 New York Giants, 1914–1915 Brooklyn Tip-Tops of the "outlaw" Federal League, and 1916–1917 Philadelphia Phillies.
- January 23 – Spoon Carter, 71, two-time Negro American League All-Star pitcher (1947 and 1948) and member of 1943–1944 Negro World Series champion Homestead Grays.
- January 28 – Paul Fittery, 86, left-handed pitcher who took the mound in 25 games for the 1914 Cincinnati Reds and 1917 Philadelphia Phillies; also appeared in five games as an outfielder or pinch hitter.

=== February ===
- February 1 – Claude Berry, 93, catcher who played sparingly for the 1904 Chicago White Sox and 1906–1907 Philadelphia Athletics, then, a decade later, appeared in 224 contests for the 1914–1915 Pittsburgh Rebels of the Federal League.
- February 4 – Hank Winston, 69, relief pitcher who worked in 15 career MLB games for 1933 Philadelphia Athletics and 1936 Brooklyn Dodgers.
- February 6 – Benny Meyer, 89, outfielder in 39 games for Brooklyn and Philadelphia of the National League (1913, 1925) and 271 games with Baltimore and Buffalo of the Federal League (1914–1915); MLB coach and longtime scout.
- February 13 – Script Lee, 75, Negro league baseball pitcher from 1921 to 1934.
- February 16:
  - Gus Brittain, 64, catcher and pinch hitter who appeared in three games for the 1937 Cincinnati Reds.
  - Bill Stellbauer, 79, outfielder who played in 25 games for the 1916 Philadelphia Athletics.
- February 19 – Frank Miller, 87, pitcher who appeared in 163 games over seven seasons spanning 1913 to 1923 for three clubs, primarily the Pittsburgh Pirates and Boston Braves.
- February 20 – Bob Christian, 28, outfielder who appeared in 54 career games for the Detroit Tigers (1968) and Chicago White Sox (1969–1970); also played for Japan's Toei Flyers (1971–1972).

=== March ===
- March 1 – Larry Doyle, 87, second baseman, primarily for the New York Giants whom he captained, who batted .300 five times and won the NL's 1912 MVP award; led NL in hits twice and stole home 17 times.
- March 4 – Les Sweetland, 74, left-handed hurler for the 1927–1930 Philadelphia Phillies and 1931 Chicago Cubs who appeared in 161 career contests.
- March 9 – Hal Quick, 56, shortstop/pinch hitter in 12 games for the 1939 Washington Senators.
- March 12 – Medric Boucher, 88, catcher who played in 17 total games for Baltimore and Pittsburgh of the Federal League in 1914.
- March 14 – Alex Pompez, 83, owner of the Negro Leagues' Cuban Stars and New York Cubans between 1916 and 1950, who later became a scouting supervisor for the New York Giants.
- March 19 – Julius "June" Greene, 74, pinch-hitter and pitcher in 32 games for 1928–1929 Philadelphia Phillies; went 7-for-25 with five walks as a batter, and 0–0 (18.38 ERA) in 152/3 innings pitched over six mound appearances.
- March 16:
  - Joe Kohlman, 61, pitcher who appeared in nine career games for the 1937–1938 Washington Senators.
  - Felton Snow, 68, All-Star third baseman and manager whose Negro leagues career extended from 1931 to 1947, notably as a member of the Baltimore Elite Giants.
- March 26 – Art Kores, 87, third baseman who played 60 games for the 1914 St. Louis Terriers of the Federal League.
- March 30 – Goose Curry, 68, outfielder, pitcher and manager whose career in Negro leagues spanned 1928 to 1948.
- March 31 – Bunny Hearn, 70, left-handed pitcher who worked in 59 games for the Boston Braves from 1926 through 1929.

=== April ===
- April 5 – Fred Snodgrass, 86, center fielder for the New York Giants (1908–1915) who made a critical drop of an easy fly ball—"Snodgrass's Muff"—in the tenth inning of the deciding game in the 1912 World Series, which was won by the Boston Red Sox.
- April 6 – Roy Wood, 81, outfielder/first baseman who played from 1913 to 1915 for the Pittsburgh Pirates and Cleveland Naps/Indians.
- April 11 – Bob Baird, 34, southpaw pitcher who posted an 0–4 record (7.25 ERA) in eight total games for the 1962–1963 Washington Senators.
- April 15 – Buddy Armour, 58, outfielder/shortstop who played in the Negro leagues from 1933 to 1947; member of 1945 Negro World Series champion Cleveland Buckeyes.
- April 20:
  - Al Eckert, 67, left-handed pitcher who went 0–2 in 18 career appearances for the 1930–1931 Cincinnati Reds and 1935 St. Louis Cardinals.
  - Elmer Ponder, 80, pitcher for the Pittsburgh Pirates (1917, 1919–1921) and Chicago Cubs (1921) who worked in 69 career games.
- April 22:
  - Chance Cummings, 81, first baseman for the Atlantic City Bacharach Giants and New York Lincoln Giants of the Eastern Colored League between 1923 and 1928.
  - Steve Swetonic, 70, pitcher for the Pittsburgh Pirates in the early 1930s, who tied for the National League lead in shutouts in the 1932 season.
- April 23 – Cy Williams, 86, center fielder for the Chicago Cubs (1912–1917) and Philadelphia Phillies (1918–1930) who became the first National League player to hit 200 home runs, leading the league four times.

=== May ===
- May 1 – Hal Anderson, 70, outfielder who played in nine games for 1932 Chicago White Sox and had a long career as minor league player and manager.
- May 5:
  - Tom McNamara, 78, pinch-hitter for the 1922 Pittsburgh Pirates.
  - Vito Tamulis, 62, left-handed pitcher who posted a 40–28 record with a 3.97 ERA in six seasons between 1934 and 1941 for the New York Yankees, St. Louis Browns, Brooklyn Dodgers and Philadelphia Phillies.
- May 13 – Vet Barnes, 62, pitcher who won 14 of 19 decisions (2.94 ERA) for the 1937–1938 Kansas City Monarchs of the Negro American League.
- May 15 – Lou North, 82, pitcher for Detroit Tigers (1913), St. Louis Cardinals (1917 and 1920–1924) and Boston Braves (1924); essentially a reliever, he appeared in 191 career games and led National League in saves (not then an official statistic) in both 1921 and 1922.
- May 18 – Dan Topping, 61, co-owner (1945 to 1964) and president (from October 1947 to 1964) of the New York Yankees, during which time the team won ten World Series and fifteen AL pennants.
- May 22 – Ernie White, 57, left-handed pitcher for St. Louis Cardinals (1940–1943) and Boston Braves (1946–1948) who posted a 17–7 mark (with an ERA of 2.40) for the 1941 Redbirds; later a minor-league manager and MLB coach.
- May 23 – Rolla Daringer, 85, Cardinals' shortstop who played 12 total games during two short trials (1914 and 1915).
- May 24 – Cliff Markle, 80, pitched in 56 games for the New York Yankees and Cincinnati Reds over five seasons spanning 1915 to 1924.

=== June ===
- June 9 – Pat Caraway, 68, southpaw hurler who appeared in 108 career games for 1930–1932 Chicago White Sox; led American League in games lost (24) in 1931.
- June 21:
  - Homer Blankenship, 71, pitcher in 13 games for the 1922–1923 Chicago White Sox and 1928 Pittsburgh Pirates.
  - Joe Jenkins, 83, reserve catcher/pinch hitter in 40 total MLB games, notably with 1917 and 1919 White Sox; did not appear in 1917 World Series, a Chicago triumph, or the infamous 1919 Fall Classic.
- June 23 – Al Boucher, 92, shortstop who played 147 games for the 1914 St. Louis Terriers of the Federal League.
- June 24 – Joe Burns, 58, third baseman/outfielder who played in 111 career games for the wartime Boston Braves (1943) and Philadelphia Athletics (1944–1945).
- June 30:
  - Mule Haas, 70, center fielder for the Pittsburgh Pirates (1925), Philadelphia Athletics (1928–1932 and 1938) and Chicago White Sox (1933–1937), who hit two home runs in the 1929 World Series; member of 1929 and 1930 world champion Athletics.
  - Red Jones, 62, outfielder/pinch hitter who was granted a 12-game trial with the St. Louis Cardinals during April and May 1940.
  - Bill Perrin, 64, left-hander who started one game on the mound for the Cleveland Indians on September 30, 1934.

=== July ===
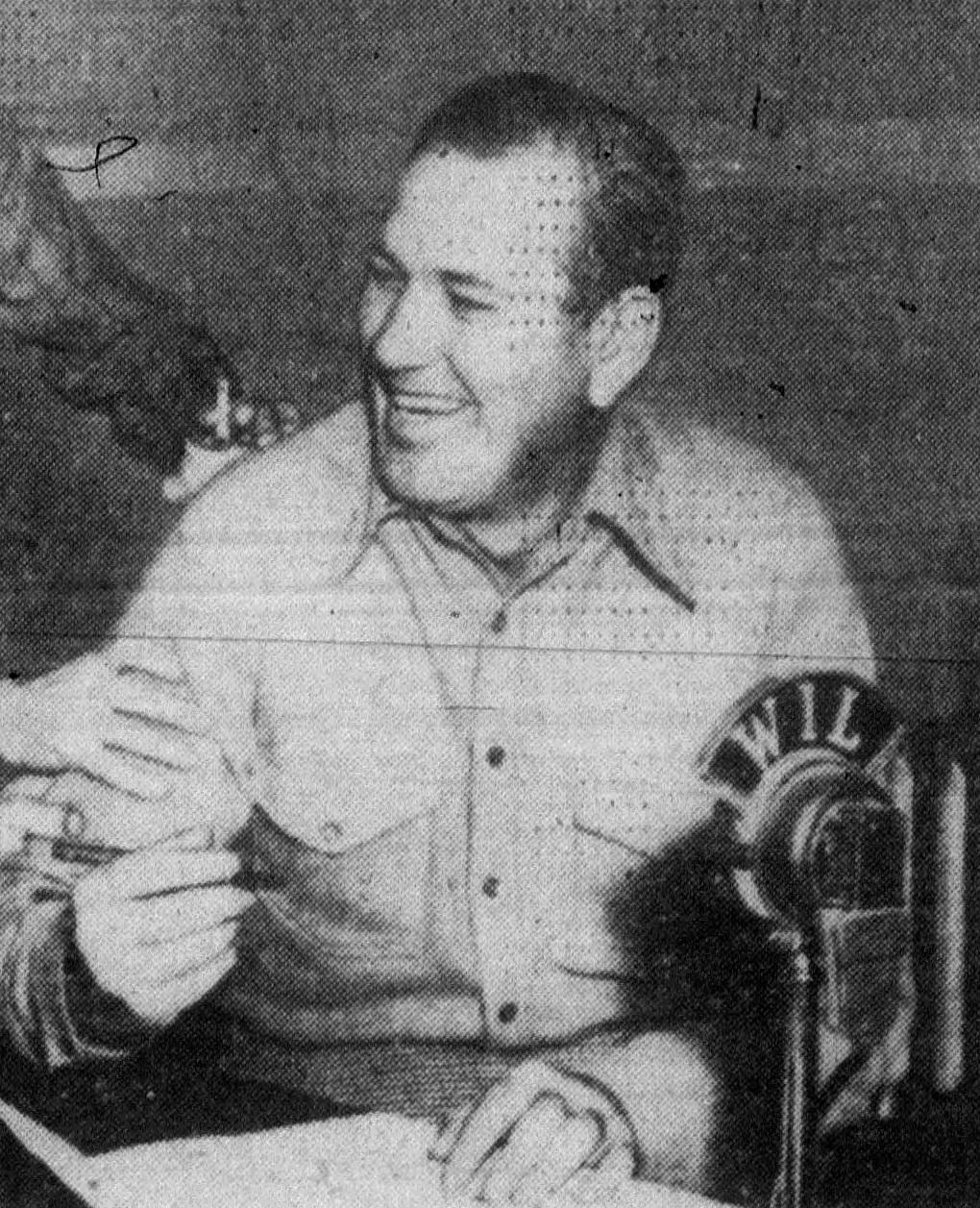
Dizzy Dean (1947)

- July 2 – Paul Strand, 80, pitcher/outfielder who appeared in 96 games (29 on the mound) for the 1913–1915 Boston Braves and 1924 Philadelphia Athletics; went 6–2 with a 2.44 ERA for 1914 "Miracle Braves".
- July 4 – Del Webb, 75, co-owner and chairman of the Yankees from 1945 to 1964; co-owner Dan Topping had died just weeks earlier.
- July 5 – Duster Mails, 79, left-handed pitcher who won 32 games for three MLB teams, principally the Cleveland Indians, between 1915 and 1926, but 226 contests in a 602-game, 18-year minor league career.
- July 9 – Leo Mangum, 78, pitcher who worked in 85 games for three teams, principally the Boston Braves, over seven seasons between 1924 and 1935.
- July 15 – Claud Derrick, 88, infielder in 113 games over all or part of five seasons (1910–1914) for the Philadelphia Athletics, New York Yankees, Cincinnati Reds and Chicago Cubs.
- July 17 – Dizzy Dean, 64, Hall of Fame pitcher who won MVP award in 1934 for the world-champion "Gas House Gang" St. Louis Cardinals with 30–7 campaign, the last 30-win season by an NL pitcher; was MVP runnerup the next two years, but a broken toe suffered in 1937 All-Star game led to a career-ending arm injury; he became a broadcaster for St. Louis Browns and national telecasts of the Game of the Week known for folksy mangling of the English language.
- July 23 – Walter Signer, 63, pitcher in ten games for World War II-era Chicago Cubs (1943, 1945).
- July 26:
  - George Barr, 82, National League umpire from 1931 to 1949 who worked four World Series and two All-Star games.
  - Vernon Stouffer, 72, Cleveland food industry and restaurant magnate who was principal owner of the Indians from 1966 to 1972.

=== August ===
- August 2 – Ty Pickup, 76, Philadelphia Phillies' outfielder who singled in his only MLB at-bat on April 30, 1918.
- August 8 – Howie Pollet, 53, left-handed pitcher and three-time National League All-Star who twice won 20 games (1946 and 1949) for the St. Louis Cardinals and twice led NL in earned run average (1943 and 1946); won 131 career games for four MLB clubs over 14-year career, and served as pitching coach of 1959–1964 Cardinals and 1965 Houston Astros; three-time World Series champion as player and coach.
- August 13 – Alto Lane, 66, pitcher who took the mound for the Memphis Red Sox, Indianapolis ABCs, Kansas City Monarchs and Cincinnati Tigers of the Negro leagues between 1929 and 1934.
- August 14 – Lefty Robinson, 83, pitcher for the St. Louis Stars, Birmingham Black Barons and Atlanta Black Crackers of the Negro leagues between 1923 and 1932.
- August 17 – Johnny Barrett, 58, outfielder in 588 career games for Pittsburgh Pirates and Boston Braves from 1942 to 1946; led NL in triples (19) and stolen bases (28) in 1944.
- August 19 – Augie Bergamo, 57, reserve outfielder for wartime 1943–1944 St. Louis Cardinals; appeared in 174 MLB games and a member of 1944 World Series champions.
- August 22 – Alfredo Edmead Jr., 17, brilliant Dominican teenaged outfielder prospect for the Pittsburgh Pirates; while playing for Salem of the Class–A Carolina League, died from a head injury inflicted during a game when, chasing a pop fly, he collided with a teammate; believed to be the youngest player ever killed in a professional baseball game.

=== September ===
- September 6 – Sammy Hale, 77, third baseman who played 883 career games for 1920–1921 Detroit Tigers, 1923–1929 Philadelphia Athletics and 1930 St. Louis Browns; batted .302 lifetime.
- September 8 – Bert Niehoff, 90, second baseman for four National League clubs from 1913 to 1918, and one of the first managers selected by the All-American Girls Professional Baseball League.
- September 16 – Frank Walker, 79, outfielder who appeared in 139 games over five seasons for the Detroit Tigers, Philadelphia Athletics and New York Giants between 1917 and 1925.
- September 19 – James "Zack" Taylor, 76, NL catcher for 15 seasons, later a coach, manager and scout for 35 years; best known as pilot of the St. Louis Browns (part of 1946 and 1948 through 1951) who was at the helm for Bill Veeck's celebrated Eddie Gaedel and "Grandstand Managers Night" stunts during the 1951 campaign.
- September 24 – Dick Porter, 72, outfielder in 675 games for Cleveland Indians (1929–1934) and Boston Red Sox (1934), batting .308 lifetime with 774 hits; longtime minor-league manager.
- September 25 – Cliff Brady, 77, a second baseman for the Boston Red Sox and minor league manager, who also was a member of the Scullin Steel soccer team which won the National Challenge Cup in 1922.
- September 26 – Lefty Stewart, 74, pitcher who won 20 games for the 1930 St. Louis Browns; also hurled for the Detroit Tigers, Washington Senators and Cleveland Indians, and went 101–98 (4.19) over his ten-year career.
- September 28 – Willie Hogan, 90, outfielder who appeared in 238 career games as a member of the Philadelphia Athletics (1911) and St. Louis Browns (1911–1912).
- September 29:
  - Van Patrick, 58, sportscaster noted for football and boxing coverage, whose baseball work included play-by-play assignments for the Cleveland Indians (1948) and Detroit Tigers (1949 and 1952–1959)
  - By Speece, 77, pitcher in 62 career games for the Washington Senators (1924), Cleveland Indians (1925–1926) and Philadelphia Phillies (1930); member of 1924 World Series champion Senators.

=== October ===
- October 5 – Ed Grimes, 69, infielder who got into 74 career games for the St. Louis Browns in 1931 and 1932.
- October 13 – Sam Rice, 84, Hall of Fame right fielder for 1915–1933 Washington Senators and 1934 Cleveland Indians; batted .322 lifetime and led AL in steals and triples once each; remembered for disputed catch in 1925 World Series; finished career with 2,987 hits, at a time when little attention was paid to career totals.
- October 20 – Leonardo Chapman, 52, first- and third-baseman for 1944 Baltimore Elite Giants of the Negro National League.
- October 22 – Pat Pieper, 88, the Chicago Cubs field (public address) announcer from 1916 to 1974, a span of 59 years.
- October 28 – George "Teddy" Wilson, 50, pinch hitter and outfielder in 145 games for three clubs, principally the New York Giants, over all or parts of three seasons (1952, 1953 and 1956).
- October 29 – Charlie Mason, 79, outfielder/first baseman for numerous Negro leagues clubs, including the New York Lincoln Giants, Atlantic City Bacharach Giants and Homestead Grays, between 1922 and 1932.
- October 30 – Jimmy Shevlin, 65, first baseman who played 53 total games for 1930 Detroit Tigers and 1932 and 1934 Cincinnati Reds.
- October 31 – Buddy Myer, 70, second baseman for the Washington Senators (1925–1927 and 1929–1941) and Boston Red Sox (1927–1928) who batted .303 lifetime with 2,131 hits; won 1935 American League batting title (.349) and led league in stolen bases (30) in 1928; two-time AL All-Star.

=== November ===
- November 1:
  - Bullet Joe Bush, 81, pitcher who won 195 games between 1912 and 1928, including a no-hitter; won 26 contests for the 1922 New York Yankees; three-time World Series champion (1913 Philadelphia Athletics, 1918 Boston Red Sox, and 1923 Yankees).
  - Red Hadley, 65, outfielder who appeared in 27 games for Atlanta and Indianapolis of the Negro American League in 1938 and 1939.
- November 4:
  - Harry Fritz, 84, third baseman who, after a brief stint with the 1913 Philadelphia Athletics, jumped to Chicago of the Federal League, playing in 144 games during the 1914 and 1915 seasons.
  - Charley Justice, 61, outfielder who played for the Akron Grays and Detroit Stars of the Negro leagues during the 1930s.
- November 10:
  - Mel Simons, 74, outfielder who appeared in 75 games for 1931–1932 Chicago White Sox.
  - Ben Paschal, 79, valuable reserve outfielder from 1924 to 1929 for the New York Yankees; member of 1927 and 1928 world champions.
- November 21 – Leon Pettit, 72, left-handed pitcher who worked in 44 MLB games for the 1935 Washington Senators and 1937 Philadelphia Phillies.
- November 23:
  - Jerry Benjamin, 65, standout centerfielder between 1932 and 1948 who three times led the Negro National League in stolen bases and was a three-time All-Star; as a member of the Homestead Grays, he played on eight NNL pennant-winners and two Negro World Series champions (1943, 1944).
  - Babe Twombly, 78, outfielder for the 1920–1921 Chicago Cubs; batted .304 lifetime with 109 hits in 165 big-league games.
- November 24 – Johnny Weekly, 37, outfielder who played in 53 games for the Houston Colt .45s from 1962 to 1964.
- November 25:
  - Herb "Duke" Brett, 74, pitcher who worked in 11 games for 1924–1925 Chicago Cubs; longtime manager in Piedmont and Carolina leagues.
- Eddie Dent, 86, starting pitcher for the Brooklyn Superbas from 1909 to 1912.
  - Frank Wilson, 73, outfielder who appeared in 168 games between 1924 and 1928 for three MLB teams, principally the Boston Braves.
- November 29 – Al Moore, 72, centerfielder who appeared in 30 games over parts of two seasons with the 1925–1926 New York Giants.

=== December ===
- December 4 – Dick Luebke, 39, left-handed pitcher who appeared in ten games for the 1962 Baltimore Orioles.
- December 5 – Jim Beckman, 69, pitcher and Cincinnati native who worked in ten games for his hometown Reds in 1927–1928.
- December 7 – Red Dorman, 74, outfielder who batted .364 in 25 games and 89 plate appearances for the Cleveland Indians in August and September 1928, his only year in the big leagues.
- December 11 – Gordon Maltzberger, 62, relief pitcher who put up a 20–13 (2.70) record with 33 saves in 135 games for the Chicago White Sox (1943–1944 and 1946–1947); later, a pitching coach.
- December 12 – Booker McDaniel, 61, All-Star pitcher for the 1941–1945 Kansas City Monarchs; led 1945 Negro American League in victories, strikeouts, games pitched, games started, complete games, shutouts and saves—among other categories.
- December 18 – Harry Hooper, 87, Hall of Fame right fielder for the Boston Red Sox and Chicago White Sox, who was an outstanding defensive player and solid leadoff hitter, helping the Red Sox to four champion titles, while retiring with the fifth-most walks in history.
- December 22 – Allyn Stout, 70, pitcher who appeared in 180 games (151 in relief) for the St. Louis Cardinals (1931–1933), Cincinnati Reds (1933–1934), New York Giants (1935) and Boston Braves (1943).
- December 25 – Felton Stratton, 79, infielder/outfielder who played for teams in the Eastern Colored League and Negro National League between 1923 and 1933.
- December 28 – Jack Salveson, 60, pitcher in 87 games for four MLB clubs, principally the Cleveland Indians, in five seasons spanning 1933 to 1945; as a 19-year-old rookie, pitched sparingly for 1933 World Series champion New York Giants.
- December 30 – Al Shaw, 93, outfielder for the 1907–1909 St. Louis Cardinals; five years later, joined the upstart Federal League, batting .301 in 244 games for Brooklyn (1914) and Kansas City (1915).
