= 1974 New York Yankees season =

Season for the Major League Baseball team the New York Yankees

1974 New York Yankees
- League: American League
- Division: East
- Ballpark: Shea Stadium
- City: New York City
- Record: 89-73 (.549)
- Owners: George Steinbrenner
- General managers: Gabe Paul
- Managers: Bill Virdon
- Television: WPIX (Phil Rizzuto, Frank Messer, Bill White)
- Radio: WMCA (Frank Messer, Phil Rizzuto, Bill White)

The 1974 New York Yankees season was the 72nd season for the team. The team finished second in the American League East with a record of 89–73, two games behind the Baltimore Orioles in Bill Virdon's first season as manager. The Yankees played at Shea Stadium due to the ongoing renovation of Yankee Stadium. This was the first season in which the away uniforms featured white outlines on the numbers and the city name. This would stay with the team for the next 50 seasons until it was retired just before the 2024 season when the white outline was removed (at the suggestion of team captain Aaron Judge) from the away jerseys, keeping the navy blue numbers.

== Offseason ==
The off-season became controversial when George Steinbrenner and Gabe Paul sought to hire former Oakland Athletics manager Dick Williams, who had resigned immediately after leading the team to its second straight World Series title. However, because Williams was still under contract to Oakland, A's owner Charlie Finley sought to block the move, the subsequent legal wrangling prevented the Yankees from hiring him. On the first anniversary of the team's ownership change, the Yankees hired former Pittsburgh Pirates manager Bill Virdon to lead the team on the field.

=== Notable transactions ===
- December 6, 1973: Jim Mason was purchased by the Yankees from the Texas Rangers.
- December 7, 1973: Lindy McDaniel was traded by the Yankees to the Kansas City Royals for Lou Piniella and Ken Wright.
- December 10, 1973: Hal Lanier was released by the Yankees.
- December 11, 1973: Ron Swoboda was released by the Yankees.
- January 9, 1974: Ken Phelps was drafted by the Yankees in the 1st round (11th pick) of the 1974 Major League Baseball draft, but did not sign.
- March 19, 1974: Jerry Moses was traded by the Yankees to the Detroit Tigers as part of a 3-team trade. The Cleveland Indians sent Walt Williams and Rick Sawyer to the Yankees, and the Tigers sent Ed Farmer to the Yankees. The Tigers sent Jim Perry to the Indians.

== Regular season ==
- August 25, 1974: Nolan Ryan of the California Angels struck out Sandy Alomar Sr. of the Yankees for the 1500th strikeout of his career. Ryan and Alomar had been teammates at the beginning of the season, but Alomar had been sold to the Yankees on July 8.
- September 7, 1974: The Yankees' Graig Nettles hit a home run against the Detroit Tigers. The next time up, he hit a broken-bat single. Tigers catcher Bill Freehan scrambled for the six superballs that came bouncing out. Nettles was called out on the single, but his solo homer was allowed and that made all the difference as the Yankees won 1–0.

=== Hall of Fame ===
Whitey Ford's number 16 was retired by the New York Yankees in 1974.

Mickey Mantle and former teammate Whitey Ford were elected to the Baseball Hall of Fame together in 1974, Mantle in his first year of eligibility, Ford in his second. Ford's number 16 was retired as well. Although Ford wore number 19 in his rookie season, following his return from the army in 1953, he wore number 16 for the remainder of his career.

=== Season standings ===
AL East
Team	W	L	Pct.	GB	Home	Road
Baltimore Orioles	91	71	.562	—	46‍–‍35	45‍–‍36
New York Yankees	89	73	.549	2	47‍–‍34	42‍–‍39
Boston Red Sox	84	78	.519	7	46‍–‍35	38‍–‍43
Cleveland Indians	77	85	.475	14	40‍–‍41	37‍–‍44
Milwaukee Brewers	76	86	.469	15	40‍–‍41	36‍–‍45
Detroit Tigers	72	90	.444	19	36‍–‍45	36‍–‍45

=== Record vs. opponents ===
1974 American League record Sources:
Team	BAL	BOS	CAL	CWS	CLE	DET	KC	MIL	MIN	NYY	OAK	TEX
Baltimore	—	10–8	7–5	5–7	12–6	14–4	8–4	8–10	6–6	11–7	6–6	4–8
Boston	8–10	—	4–8	8–4	9–9	11–7	4–8	10–8	6–6	11–7	8–4	5–7
California	5–7	8–4	—	10–8–1	3–9	5–7	8–10	3–9	8–10	3–9	6–12	9–9
Chicago	7–5	4–8	8–10–1	—	8–4	7–5	11–7	8–4	7–11–1	4–8	7–11	9–7–1
Cleveland	6–12	9–9	9–3	4–8	—	9–9	8–4	10–8	6–6	7–11	5–7	4–8
Detroit	4–14	7–11	7–5	5–7	9–9	—	7–5	9–9	3–9	11–7	5–7	5–7
Kansas City	4–8	8–4	10–8	7–11	4–8	5–7	—	11–1	8–10	4–8	8–10	8–10
Milwaukee	10–8	8–10	9–3	4–8	8–10	9–9	1–11	—	6–6	9–9	5–7	7–5
Minnesota	6–6	6–6	10–8	11–7–1	6–6	9–3	10–8	6–6	—	4–8	5–13	9–9
New York	7–11	7–11	9–3	8–4	11–7	7–11	8–4	9–9	8–4	—	7–5	8–4
Oakland	6–6	4–8	12–6	11–7	7–5	7–5	10–8	7–5	13–5	5–7	—	8–10
Texas	8–4	7–5	9–9	7–9–1	8–4	7–5	10–8	5–7	9–9	4–8	10–8	—

=== Notable transactions ===
- April 26, 1974: Fritz Peterson, Steve Kline, Fred Beene, and Tom Buskey were traded by the Yankees to the Cleveland Indians for Chris Chambliss, Dick Tidrow and Cecil Upshaw.
- May 4, 1974: Mike Pazik and cash were traded by the Yankees to the Minnesota Twins for Dick Woodson.
- May 31, 1974: Horace Clarke and Lowell Palmer were purchased from the Yankees by the San Diego Padres.
- June 5, 1974: Dennis Sherrill was drafted by the Yankees in the 1st round (12th pick) of the 1974 Major League Baseball draft.
- June 15, 1974: Rudy May was purchased by the Yankees from the California Angels.
- July 8, 1974: Sandy Alomar Sr. was purchased by the Yankees from the California Angels.
- September 29, 1974: Jesús Figueroa was signed as an amateur free agent by the Yankees.

=== Roster ===
1974 New York Yankees
Roster
Pitchers: 47 Fred Beene; 29 Tom Buskey; 36 Pat Dobson; 39 Larry Gura; 38 Steve Kline; 28 Sparky Lyle; 40 Tippy Martinez; 43 Rudy May; 48 Sam McDowell; 42 Doc Medich; 53 Dave Pagan; 19 Fritz Peterson; 40 Rick Sawyer; 30 Mel Stottlemyre; 19 Dick Tidrow; 38 Cecil Upshaw; 41 Mike Wallace; 29 Dick Woodson; 42 Ken Wright	Catchers: 43 Jim Deidel; 46 Rick Dempsey; 15 Thurman Munson; 41 Duke Sims; Infielders: 2 Sandy Alomar Sr.; 10 Chris Chambliss; 20 Horace Clarke; 26 Fernando González; 18 Mike Hegan; 22 Jim Mason; 17 Gene Michael; 9 Graig Nettles; 11 Fred Stanley; 44 Bill Sudakis; 24 Otto Vélez	Outfielders: 12 Ron Blomberg; 23 Alex Johnson; 27 Elliott Maddox; 1 Bobby Murcer; 18,52 Larry Murray; 14 Lou Piniella; 6 Roy White; 51 Terry Whitfield; 13 Walt Williams; Other batters: 43 Jim Ray Hart	Manager: 21 Bill Virdon; Coaches: 16 Whitey Ford (Pitching); 32 Elston Howard (First Base); 34 Dick Howser (Third Base); 31 Mel Wright (Bullpen)

== Player stats ==
=== Batting ===
==== Starters by position ====
Note: Pos = Position; G = Games played; AB = At bats; H = Hits; Avg. = Batting average; HR = Home runs; RBI = Runs batted in

Pos	Player	G	AB	H	Avg.	HR	RBI
C	Thurman Munson	144	517	135	.261	13	60
1B	Chris Chambliss	110	400	97	.243	6	43
2B	Sandy Alomar Sr.	76	279	75	.269	1	27
3B	Graig Nettles	155	566	139	.246	22	75
SS	Jim Mason	152	440	110	.250	5	37
LF	Lou Piniella	140	518	158	.305	9	70
CF	Elliott Maddox	137	466	141	.303	3	45
RF	Bobby Murcer	156	606	166	.274	10	88
DH	Ron Blomberg	90	264	82	.311	10	48

==== Other batters ====
Note: G = Games played; AB = At bats; H = Hits; Avg. = Batting average; HR = Home runs; RBI = Runs batted in

Player	G	AB	H	Avg.	HR	RBI
Roy White	136	473	130	.275	7	43
Bill Sudakis	89	259	60	.232	7	39
Gene Michael	81	177	46	.260	0	13
Fernando González	51	121	26	.215	1	7
Rick Dempsey	43	109	26	.239	2	12
Otto Vélez	27	67	14	.209	2	10
Mike Hegan	18	53	12	.226	2	9
Walt Williams	43	53	6	.113	0	3
Horace Clarke	24	47	11	.234	0	1
Fred Stanley	33	38	7	.184	0	3
Alex Johnson	10	28	6	.214	1	2
Jim Ray Hart	10	19	1	.053	0	0
Duke Sims	5	15	2	.133	0	2
Terry Whitfield	2	5	1	.200	0	0
Jim Deidel	2	2	0	.000	0	0
Larry Murray	6	1	0	.000	0	0

=== Pitching ===
==== Starting pitchers ====
Note: G = Games pitched; IP = Innings pitched; W = Wins; L = Losses; ERA = Earned run average; SO = Strikeouts

Player	G	IP	W	L	ERA	SO
Pat Dobson	39	281.0	19	15	3.07	157
Doc Medich	38	279.2	19	15	3.60	154
Dick Tidrow	33	190.2	11	9	3.87	100
Rudy May	17	114.1	8	4	2.28	90
Mel Stottlemyre	16	113.0	6	7	3.58	40
Larry Gura	8	56.0	5	1	2.41	17
Steve Kline	4	26.0	2	2	3.46	6

==== Other pitchers ====
Note: G = Games pitched; IP = Innings pitched; W = Wins; L = Losses; ERA = Earned run average; SO = Strikeouts

Player	G	IP	W	L	ERA	SO
Dave Pagan	16	49.1	1	3	5.11	39
Sam McDowell	13	48.0	1	6	4.69	33
Dick Woodson	8	28.0	1	2	5.79	12
Fritz Peterson	3	7.2	0	0	4.70	5

==== Relief pitchers ====
Note: G = Games pitched; W = Wins; L = Losses; SV = Saves; ERA = Earned run average; SO = Strikeouts

Player	G	W	L	SV	ERA	SO
Sparky Lyle	66	9	3	15	1.66	89
Cecil Upshaw	36	1	5	6	3.02	27
Mike Wallace	23	6	0	0	2.41	34
Tippy Martinez	10	0	0	0	4.26	10
Fred Beene	6	0	0	1	2.70	10
Tom Buskey	4	0	1	1	6.35	3
Ken Wright	3	0	0	0	3.18	2
Rick Sawyer	1	0	0	0	16.20	0

== Awards and honors ==
- Bill Virdon, The Sporting News Manager of the Year Award

== Farm system ==
Level	Team	League	Manager
AAA	Syracuse Chiefs	International League	Bobby Cox
AA	West Haven Yankees	Eastern League	Doc Edwards
A	Fort Lauderdale Yankees	Florida State League	Pete Ward
A-Short Season	Oneonta Yankees	New York–Penn League	Mike Ferraro
Rookie	Johnson City Yankees	Appalachian League	Gene Hassell

LEAGUE CHAMPIONS: Oneonta
