= Charles Justice =

Charles, Charlie, or Charley Justice may refer to:

- Charles M. Justice (1909–1981), head coach of the University of New Hampshire's football team
- Charley Justice (1913–1974), American baseball player
- Charlie Justice (halfback) (1924–2003), American football halfback
- Charlie Justice (politician) (born 1968), American politician
