= Chris Chambliss =

American baseball player (born 1948)

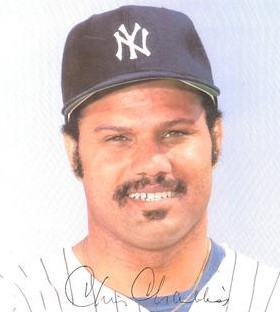
- Chambliss with the Yankees in 1979
- First baseman
- Born: December 26, 1948 (age 77); Dayton, Ohio, U.S.
- Batted: Left Threw: Right

MLB debut
- May 28, 1971, for the Cleveland Indians

Last MLB appearance
- May 8, 1988, for the New York Yankees

MLB statistics
- Batting average: .279
- Hits: 2,109
- Home runs: 185
- Runs batted in: 972
- Stats at Baseball Reference

Teams
- As player: Cleveland Indians (1971–1974); New York Yankees (1974–1979); Atlanta Braves (1980–1986); New York Yankees (1988); As coach: New York Yankees (1988); St. Louis Cardinals (1993–1995); New York Yankees (1996–2000); New York Mets (2002); Cincinnati Reds (2004–2006); Seattle Mariners (2011–2012)

Career highlights and awards
- All-Star (1976); 6× World Series champion (1977, 1978, 1996, 1998–2000); AL Rookie of the Year (1971); Gold Glove Award (1978)

Carroll Christopher Chambliss (born December 26, 1948) is an American former professional baseball player and coach. He played in Major League Baseball from 1971 to 1988 for the Cleveland Indians, New York Yankees and Atlanta Braves. He served as a coach for the Yankees, St. Louis Cardinals, New York Mets, Cincinnati Reds, and Seattle Mariners.

Chambliss won the American League Rookie of the Year Award with the Indians in 1971. He was an All-Star with the Yankees in 1976, the same year he hit the series-winning home run in the 1976 American League Championship Series. He was a member of the Yankees' 1977 and 1978 World Series championship teams, both against the Los Angeles Dodgers, and won the Gold Glove Award in 1978. Chambliss went on to win four more World Series championships as the hitting coach for the Yankees in 1996, 1998, 1999, and 2000.

== Early life ==
Chambliss was born in Dayton, Ohio, on December 26, 1948. He was the third of four sons born to Carroll and Christene Chambliss. His father was a chaplain in the United States Navy, leading the family to relocate many times during Chris' childhood. They settled in Oceanside, California, where Chris attended high school. Chris and his brothers all played baseball on the Oceanside High School baseball team.

== Playing career ==
=== College ===
Chambliss enrolled at MiraCosta College, a junior college in Oceanside, where he played college baseball. Despite being selected in the Major League Baseball (MLB) drafts of 1967 and 1968 by the Cincinnati Reds, he opted not to sign with the Reds on either occasion. He transferred to the University of California, Los Angeles (UCLA), where he continued his college baseball career in 1969. That season, he led the Bruins with 15 home runs and 45 runs batted in. During the summer, he played collegiate summer baseball for the Anchorage Glacier Pilots of the Alaska Baseball League, which won the National Baseball Congress (NBC) championship. Chambliss had a .583 batting average in the NBC tournament and was named the tournament's Most Valuable Player.

=== Cleveland Indians ===
The Cleveland Indians selected Chambliss with the first overall pick in the January 1970 Major League Baseball draft, and assigned him to the Wichita Aeros of the Class AAA American Association, their most advanced minor league baseball affiliate. With the Aeros, Chambliss batted .342, which led the league.

With Ken Harrelson serving as the Indians' first baseman, the Indians had Chambliss play in the outfield for Wichita in 1971, in order to have both players in their lineup at the same time. He debuted in the majors in 1971, and was named AL Rookie of the Year. Chambliss played first base and was known as a great clutch hitter throughout his career.

=== New York Yankees ===
Chambliss was traded along with Dick Tidrow and Cecil Upshaw from the Indians to the New York Yankees for Fritz Peterson, Steve Kline, Fred Beene, and Tom Buskey on April 26, 1974. The Yankees were criticized for giving away four pitchers as opposed to the two it got in return and a failure to land a starting second baseman.

Chris Chambliss was once quoted as saying, "If you're not having fun [in baseball], you miss the point of everything."

During the 1976 season, Chambliss appeared in the All-Star Game.

In the deciding Game 5 of the American League Championship Series against the Kansas City Royals, Chambliss hit Mark Littell's first pitch in the bottom of the ninth inning over the right field wall for a game-winning home run, giving the Yankees their first pennant since 1964.

Chambliss was the hitting star of the 1976 American League Championship Series (ALCS), as he also hit a two-run homer in Game 3 to help the Yankees win that game 5–3. He hit an ALCS record .524 (11-for-21) with 2 home runs and eight runs batted in . In the four-game World Series against the Cincinnati Reds, Chambliss hit .313 (5-for-16) with one runs batted in.

Chambliss played three more seasons with the Yankees, helping lead them to the World Series title in 1977–their first in fifteen years–and winning a Gold Glove for his fielding prowess in 1978.

==== The "Chris Chambliss Rule" ====
Immediately after that 1976 walk-off home run, thousands of fans stormed the Yankee Stadium field to celebrate. Chambliss was mobbed on the basepaths and did not make an attempt to touch home plate. Instead, he ran straight toward the dugout and the safety of the Yankee clubhouse. Chambliss was then asked by Graig Nettles if he had touched home, and responded that he had not because too many people were in the way. Nettles then told him that home plate umpire Art Frantz was waiting for him to touch home so that the home run could be ruled official. He was then escorted back out onto the field to touch home, but the plate had been stolen, so he touched the area where the plate had been.

Said Chambliss:

"I just kind of reacted like I always did. I wasn't trying to hit a home run. Sometimes when you react to a high fastball it works out that way. Then, when I was running around the bases, fans were coming at me from everywhere, grabbing me, pounding me on the back. I was just trying to get around the bases and into the dugout---I ran at least one guy over---but I never made it to home plate. Later, after I got to the clubhouse, [Graig] Nettles said I should return to the field and touch home plate, just to make it official. But when we got back out there, home plate and all the other bases were gone, stripped from their moorings and confiscated by the delirious Yankee fans."

Kansas City manager Whitey Herzog could have appealed the play, as Major League Baseball rules state that a player must touch all bases on any hit or when running the bases. However, the mayhem on the field made this task impossible, and given the magnitude of the game, Herzog would have never tried to have it restarted or protested due to a technicality. In any event, the umpires had already decided to let the run count given the circumstances of the situation.

As a result of this incident, Major League Baseball changed the rules to allow the umpire to award any base runner or batter a run when he cannot reach the plate due to fans rushing the field. This had the effect of codifying the decision made by the umpires in Game 5.

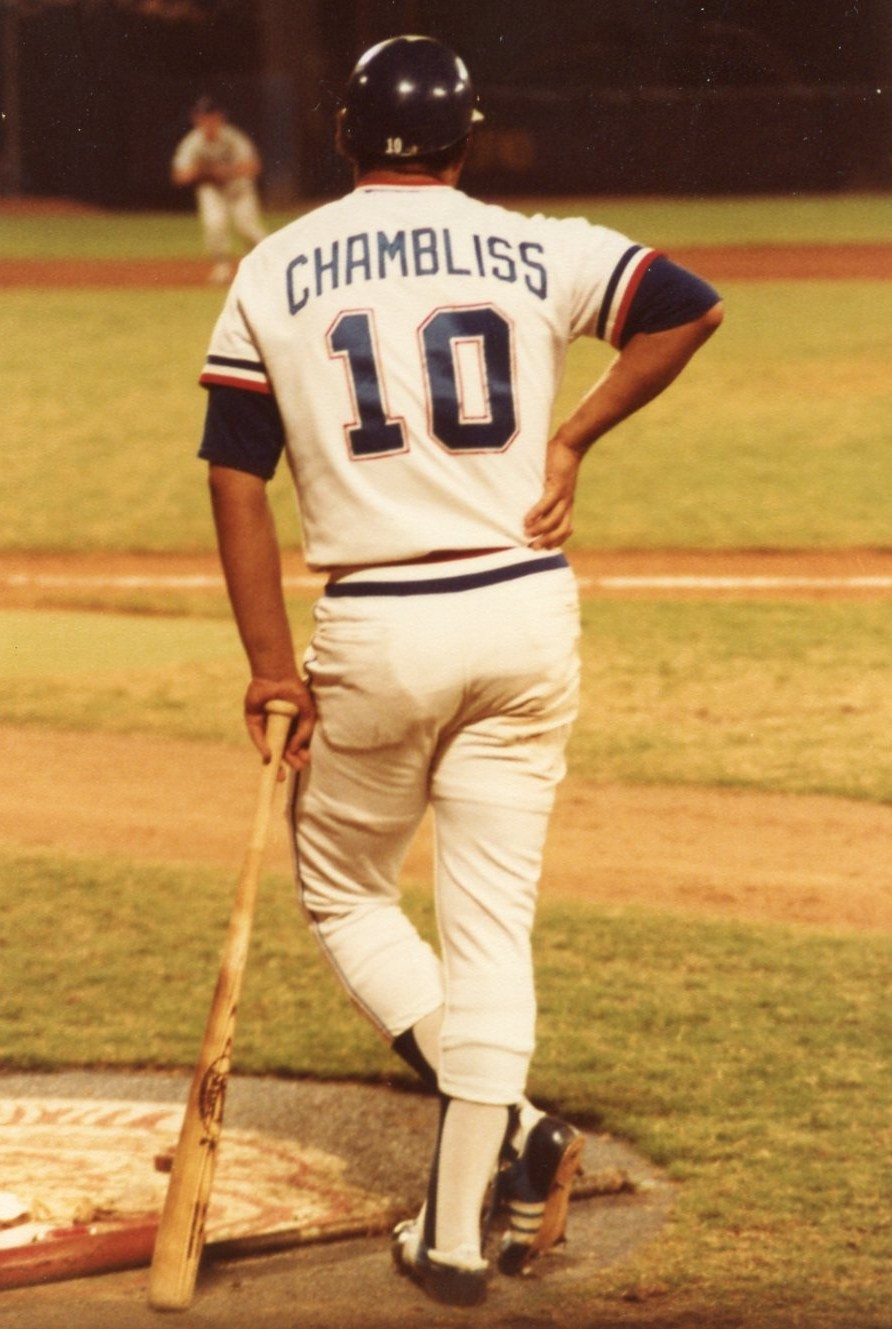
Chambliss as a member of the Atlanta Braves in the 1980s.

=== Later career ===
After the 1979 season, the Yankees traded Chambliss to the Toronto Blue Jays with Damaso Garcia and Paul Mirabella for Rick Cerone, Tom Underwood, and Ted Wilborn. The Yankees hoped that Cerone would replace the late Thurman Munson as their starting catcher. Later that offseason, the Blue Jays traded Chambliss with Luis Gómez to the Atlanta Braves for prospects Barry Bonnell, Joey McLaughlin, and Pat Rockett.

Chambliss played for the Atlanta Braves from 1980 through 1986. He had one at-bat with the Yankees in 1988 and struck out. Lou Piniella claimed this at-bat earned Chambliss about $20,000, since he had to be paid the minimum player salary for the season once he was activated for that at-bat. He retired with a career .279 batting average and 185 home runs.

After his playing days, Chambliss was a hitting instructor for several teams and was talked about as a possible managerial candidate.

== Coaching and managerial career ==
In 1989, Chambliss became the manager for the Double-A London Tigers of the Eastern League, an affiliate of the Detroit Tigers. The London Tigers won the Eastern League title in 1990, playing out of Labatt Park. That same year Chambliss was named Minor League Manager of the Year by The Sporting News.

Chambliss was also a hitting coach with the Yankees, and has the distinction of being one of two men who wore a Yankees uniform (player or coach) during each of the Yankees' last six World Series Championship seasons prior to 2009 (1977, 1978, 1996, 1998, 1999, and 2000)—the other is former New York Mets manager Willie Randolph. Chambliss was also the hitting coach for the St. Louis Cardinals, New York Mets and Cincinnati Reds.

For many years, Chambliss was a leading candidate to manage a major league team. He was considered for manager of the Chicago White Sox in 1991, the Los Angeles Dodgers in 1996, the Mets in 1999, the Dodgers and Arizona Diamondbacks in 2000, and the Mets again in 2002.

Chambliss was the manager of the Triple A Charlotte Knights prior to joining the Seattle Mariners in November 2010 as hitting coach. At the conclusion of the 2012 season, the Mariners announced that Chambliss would not be returning as their hitting coach in 2013.

== Personal ==
Chambliss' cousin is former NBA player Jo Jo White.

His son Russell is a graduate of Washington University in St. Louis, and currently hitting coach with the Peoria Chiefs.

== See also ==
- List of Major League Baseball career hits leaders
- List of St. Louis Cardinals coaches

Sporting positions
Preceded by Jay Ward	New York Yankees hitting coach 1988	Succeeded by Champ Summers
Preceded by first manager	London Tigers Manager; 1989–1990	Succeeded by Gene Roof
Preceded by Buddy Bailey	Greenville Braves Manager; 1991	Succeeded by Grady Little
Preceded by Phil Niekro	Richmond Braves Manager; 1992	Succeeded by Grady Little
Preceded by Don Baylor	St. Louis Cardinals hitting coach 1993–1995	Succeeded by George Hendrick
Preceded by Rick Down	New York Yankees hitting coach 1996–2000	Succeeded by Gary Denbo
Preceded by Lynn Jones	Calgary Cannons Manager; 2001	Succeeded by Dean Treanor
Preceded by Dave Engle	New York Mets hitting coach 2002	Succeeded by Denny Walling
Preceded by Ray Knight	Cincinnati Reds hitting coach 2004–2006	Succeeded by Brook Jacoby
Preceded by Marc Bombard	Charlotte Knights Manager; 2009–2010	Succeeded by Joe McEwing
