= Steve Kline (right-handed pitcher) =

American baseball player (1947–2018)

- Pitcher
- Born: October 6, 1947; Wenatchee, Washington, U.S.
- Died: June 4, 2018 (aged 70); Chelan, Washington, U.S.
- Batted: Right Threw: Right

MLB debut
- July 10, 1970, for the New York Yankees

Last MLB appearance
- July 24, 1977, for the Atlanta Braves

MLB statistics
- Win–loss record: 43–45
- Earned run average: 3.26
- Strikeouts: 240
- Stats at Baseball Reference

Teams
- New York Yankees (1970–1974); Cleveland Indians (1974); Atlanta Braves (1977)

Steven Jack Kline (October 6, 1947 – June 4, 2018) was an American professional baseball player, a former starting pitcher who appeared in Major League Baseball from 1970 through 1974 and in 1977. Listed at 6 feet 3 inches (1.91 m) tall and 200 pounds (91 kg), Kline batted and threw right-handed.

Kline was originally drafted by the New York Yankees in the seventh round of the 1966 MLB Draft. He was 22 years old when he reached the majors in 1970 with the Yankees, spending four and a half years with them before moving to the Cleveland Indians (1974) and Atlanta Braves (1977). In his rookie season for the Yankees, he went 6–6 with a 3.41 ERA in 15 starts, and won 12 games a year later, including career-numbers with 81 strikeouts and 15 complete games.

His most productive season came in 1972, when he recorded career-highs in wins (16), ERA (2.40), starts (32), shutouts (4), and innings pitched (236⅓). He was traded along with Fritz Peterson, Fred Beene and Tom Buskey from the Yankees to the Indians for Chris Chambliss, Dick Tidrow and Cecil Upshaw on April 26, 1974. Kline missed the 1975 season with arm problems, and spent 1976 back in minor league baseball before making 16 relief appearances for Atlanta in 1977, his last Major League season.

In a six-season MLB career, Kline posted a 43–45 record with 240 strikeouts and a 3.26 ERA in 750 1/3 innings and 129 games pitched, 105 as a starter. He allowed 708 hits and 184 bases on balls.

He was a pitching coach at Wenatchee High School in Washington. Kline died June 4, 2018.

== See also ==
- Steve Kline (left-handed pitcher)
- Steven Klein (disambiguation)
