= Cecil Upshaw =

American baseball player (1942–1995)

- Pitcher
- Born: October 22, 1942; Spearsville, Louisiana, U.S.
- Died: February 7, 1995 (aged 52); Lawrenceville, Georgia, U.S.
- Batted: Right Threw: Right

MLB debut
- October 1, 1966, for the Atlanta Braves

Last MLB appearance
- September 28, 1975, for the Chicago White Sox

MLB statistics
- Win–loss record: 34–36
- Earned run average: 3.13
- Strikeouts: 323
- Saves: 86
- Stats at Baseball Reference

Teams
- Atlanta Braves (1966–1969, 1971–1973); Houston Astros (1973); Cleveland Indians (1974); New York Yankees (1974); Chicago White Sox (1975)

Cecil Lee Upshaw Jr. (October 22, 1942 – February 7, 1995) was an American professional baseball right-handed relief pitcher, who had a nine- year career in Major League Baseball (MLB) (1966–1969, 1971–1975), for the Atlanta Braves and Houston Astros of the National League (NL), and the Cleveland Indians, New York Yankees, and Chicago White Sox of the American League (AL).

Born in Spearsville, Louisiana, Upshaw attended Bossier High School (Louisiana) and played college baseball at Centenary College of Louisiana, in Shreveport. He is a member of the Centenary Athletics Hall of Fame. While at Centenary, Upshaw was a member of Kappa Sigma fraternity.

Upshaw was among the top ten in saves four times in the National League between 1968 and 1972. He was primarily a sidearm pitcher.

In the Braves’ division-winning 1969 campaign, Upshaw had a 6–4 win–loss record, with a 2.91 earned run average (ERA), and a career-high 27 saves (to finish second in the league).

Upshaw‘s career was cut short due to an unfortunate incident in 1970. He and two other Braves players were walking down a San Diego sidewalk and one of the other players bet him he could not jump up and touch an overhead awning. Upshaw did reach the awning, but a ring on his pitching hand became caught on a projection sticking out from the awning which tore ligaments in his hand. He never fully recovered, but was considered one of the better relief pitchers in major league baseball up to that time.

Upshaw was traded four times within a span of two years, including at two consecutive Winter Meetings. First, from the Braves to the Astros for Norm Miller on April 22, 1973. Then, from the Astros to the Indians for Jerry Johnson on December 3, 1973. He was acquired along with Chris Chambliss and Dick Tidrow by the Yankees from the Indians for Fritz Peterson, Steve Kline, Fred Beene and Tom Buskey on April 26, 1974. The Yankees were criticized for giving away four pitchers as opposed to the two it got in return and a failure to land a starting second baseman. Finally, from the Yankees to the White Sox for Eddie Leon on December 5, 1974.

Upshaw finished his career with 87 saves. He had a career ERA of 3.13. Upshaw pitched 563 career innings, in 348 games.

On February 7, 1995, Upshaw died at age 52 as the result of a heart attack in Lawrenceville, Georgia.
