= Fritz Peterson =

American baseball player (1942–2023)

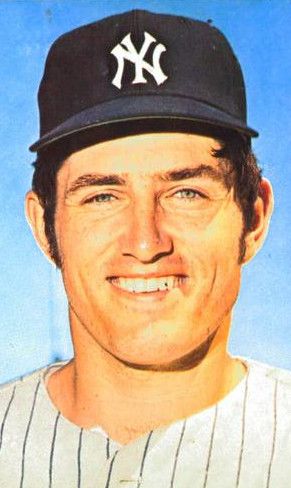
- Peterson in 1970
- Pitcher
- Born: February 8, 1942; Chicago, Illinois, U.S.
- Died: October 19, 2023 (aged 81); Winona, Minnesota, U.S.
- Batted: Switch Threw: Left

MLB debut
- April 15, 1966, for the New York Yankees

Last MLB appearance
- June 19, 1976, for the Texas Rangers

MLB statistics
- Win–loss record: 133–131
- Earned run average: 3.30
- Strikeouts: 1,015
- Stats at Baseball Reference

Teams
- New York Yankees (1966–1974); Cleveland Indians (1974–1976); Texas Rangers (1976)

Career highlights and awards
- All-Star (1970)

Fred Ingels Peterson (February 8, 1942 – October 19, 2023) was an American professional baseball pitcher who played in Major League Baseball (MLB) for the New York Yankees, Cleveland Indians, and Texas Rangers from 1966 to 1976.

Peterson was a left handed starting pitcher who enjoyed his best success in 1970 with the Yankees when he went 20–11 and pitched in the All-Star game. He was widely known for trading families with teammate Mike Kekich in the early 1970s. He had a career record of 133–131. Peterson had the lowest ratio of base on balls per innings pitched for any left-handed pitcher to pitch in the major leagues since the 1920s.

== Early life and career ==
Peterson attended Arlington High School in Arlington Heights, Illinois. He and Gene Dahlquist anchored the baseball team's starting rotation.

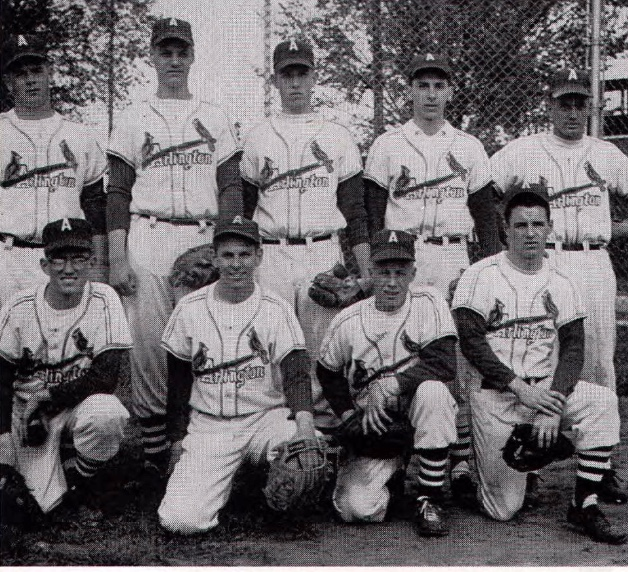
Fritz Peterson (first row, far left, with glasses) on the Arlington High School baseball team during his senior year

Peterson attended Northern Illinois University. He was viewed as a promising ice hockey player and gave up playing hockey to concentrate on baseball. He played college baseball for the Northern Illinois Huskies. The New York Yankees signed Peterson in 1963 as an amateur free agent by Yankee scout Lou Maguolo.

== Professional career ==
=== Minor leagues ===
After signing with the Yankees, Peterson was assigned to the Harlan Yankees of the Rookie-level Appalachian League. In twelve games (ten starts), he had a 4–3 win–loss record with a 4.43 earned run average (ERA); he struck out 80 batters in 61 innings pitched. He also batted .273 with one home run. In 1964, Peterson played for the Shelby Yankees in the Class A Western Carolinas League. In 21 games started, Peterson amassed a 10–7 record, with a 2.73 ERA; he struck out a team-leading 194 batters in 155 innings. He also hit .345 with four home runs. He played winter ball in the 1964 Florida East Coast Instructional League; he had a 7–2 record with a 1.68 ERA, striking out 45 batters in 59 innings.

Assigned to the Greensboro Yankees of the Class A Carolina League in 1965, Peterson had an 11–1 record in fourteen starts, with a 1.50 ERA, and 83 strikeouts in 108 innings. He was later moved up to the Columbus Confederate Yankees in the Class AA Southern League. He went 5–5 with a 2.18 ERA in twelve starts with 62 strikeouts in 91 innings. Yankees minor league pitching coach Cloyd Boyer was credited with helping Peterson become a star pitcher.

=== Major leagues ===
==== MLB rookie season ====
Peterson was invited to spring training with the Yankees in 1966. Yankees manager Johnny Keane was high on Peterson, telling reporters that he averaged three strikeouts for every walk in the minors. At age 24, he became the number two starter on the Yankees pitching staff.

He made his major league debut on Friday, April 15, 1966, against the Baltimore Orioles. Before a crowd of 35,624 at Memorial Stadium in Baltimore, Peterson pitched a complete game, striking out three batters and walking none. The Yankees won 3–2, giving Peterson his first major league victory. Future Hall of Famer Frank Robinson hit a solo home run off of Peterson in the ninth inning, but he got Brooks Robinson to fly out to left and Boog Powell grounded out to first to give the Yankees the win. The losing pitcher was Wally Bunker. His first major league strikeouts were Paul Blair, Andy Etchebarren, and Bunker.

"Where the vintage pitchers like Whitey Ford, Pedro Ramos, and Bob Friend had failed, Frederick (Fritz) Peterson succeeded yesterday for the New York Yankees. In his first major league game, the 24-year-old left-hander beat the Baltimore Orioles, 3–2, and drew an accolade from his manager, Johnny Keane," The New York Times wrote of his debut. Keane said: "Not many young pitchers have his control. That's his strength, that and his fastball."

In his rookie season, Peterson went 12–11 in 32 starts for the Yankees. He had a 3.31 ERA with 96 strikeouts in 215 innings. He tied Mel Stottlemyre (12–20) as the team leader in wins.

==== Yankees starting pitcher ====
Peterson went 8–14 in 1967 (3.47 ERA, 102 strikeouts), 12–11 in 1968 (2.63 ERA, 115 strikeouts), and 17–16 in 1969 (2.55 ERA, 150 strikeouts). He had the best season of his career in 1970, with a 20–11 record (2.90 ERA, 127 strikeouts). He went 15–13 in 1971 (3.05 ERA, 130 strikeouts), 17–15 in 1972 (3.24 ERA, 100 strikeouts), and 8–15 in 1973 (3.95 ERA, 59 strikeouts). In 1969 and 1970, Peterson had the best strikeout-to-walk ratios in the AL. Peterson also led the league in fewest walks per 9 innings pitched 5 years in a row, 1968–1972. The last pitcher who did that 5 years in a row was Cy Young. In 1970 and 1975, he had the 10th-best win–loss percentages in the league.

In his nine years as a Yankees pitcher, Peterson had a 109–106 record, with a 3.10 ERA and 893 strikeouts. Between 1969 and 1972, Peterson was one of the most successful left handed pitchers in baseball; only Mike Cuellar, Mickey Lolich, and Dave McNally won more games in the American League than Peterson did during those four years. He is ninth on the Yankees All-Time Games Started list, and tenth on the All-Time Yankees Innings Pitched list.

Peterson never played in a post-season game with the Yankees. "Mediocre at best," Peterson said of the Yankee teams that followed the Mantle-Maris era of the mid to late 1960s. "Pathetic at worst."

==== American League All-Star ====
Peterson was named to the 1970 AL All-Star team. The American League team was leading 4–1 in the bottom of the ninth inning when Catfish Hunter gave up a home run and two singles. With runners at first and second, Peterson was called in by AL Manager Earl Weaver to replace Hunter. Future Hall of Famer Willie McCovey singled to right, driving in Bud Harrelson, with future HOF'er Joe Morgan moving to third. Fellow Yankee Stottlemyre then replaced Peterson.

==== Trade to Cleveland Indians ====
Peterson's pitching seemed to suffer in 1973 and 1974 after the swap, and he was roundly booed in nearly every American League ballpark afterwards. The Yankees traded Peterson, Steve Kline, Fred Beene, and Tom Buskey to the Cleveland Indians for Chris Chambliss, Dick Tidrow, and Cecil Upshaw on April 26, 1974. Peterson went 9–14 for the Indians in 1974, and 14–8 in 1975.

==== Later career ====
After a 0–3 start with a 5.55 ERA in nine games, the Indians traded Peterson to the Texas Rangers for Stan Perzanowski and cash on May 29, 1976. He started two games for the Rangers and had a 1–0 record when a shoulder injury ended his season. The Rangers released him on February 2, 1977. Two weeks later, he signed as a free agent with the Chicago White Sox. After his second shoulder surgery, Peterson announced his retirement from baseball on May 4, 1977.

== Trading families ==
Peterson and fellow Yankee pitcher Mike Kekich swapped wives and children, an arrangement the pair announced at spring training in March 1973. The Peterson and Kekich families had been friends since 1969. Peterson and the former Susanne Kekich remained married, but the relationship between Kekich and Marilyn Peterson only lasted a few months. By June, the Yankees traded Kekich.

"It's a love story. It wasn't anything dirty," Peterson told a reporter in 2013. "I could not be happier with anybody in the world. 'Mama' and I go out and party every night. We're still on the honeymoon and it has been a real blessing."

== Post-baseball career ==
Peterson provided color commentary for the New York Raiders of the World Hockey Association during the 1972–73 season. Later, Peterson and Susanne Kekich lived outside Chicago, where he worked as a blackjack dealer at the Grand Victoria Casino in Elgin, Illinois. Jim Bouton discussed Peterson in his bestselling 1970 non-fiction book Ball Four, but Peterson was unhappy to find out after the fact that Bouton had been keeping a diary of the season.

Peterson released his first book, Mickey Mantle Is Going to Heaven in July 2009. He authored The Art of De-Conditioning: Eating Your Way to Heaven, where he wrote about his decision to "accept his own eating habits and no longer worry about his weight affecting him on the field." His third book, When the Yankees Were on the Fritz: Revisiting the Horace Clarke Era, looks at a low-point in Yankee history when the team could not win a pennant despite the pitching combination of Peterson and Stottlemyre.

Peterson survived prostate cancer twice. He was an "intensively religious" man, an "evangelical Christian who used to work with Baseball Chapel."

A known practical joker, Peterson was reportedly popular with this teammates, entertaining them with his elaborate jokes. He once used fake Baseball Hall of Fame letterhead to ask Moose Skowron to donate his pacemaker after he died, and used fake Yankees letterhead to ask Clete Boyer to participate in an "official drinking contest" against Don Larsen and Graig Nettles.

Peterson was a regular attendee at the Yankees Fantasy Camp in Florida, and the Yankees Old-Timers' Day game at Yankee Stadium.

In April 2018, Peterson revealed in an interview with the New York Post that he had been diagnosed with Alzheimer's disease in September 2017. He died at the age of 81 from lung cancer at his home in Winona, Minnesota, on October 19, 2023. His death was not announced publicly until April 12, 2024.
