= Dick Tidrow =

American baseball player and executive (1947–2021)

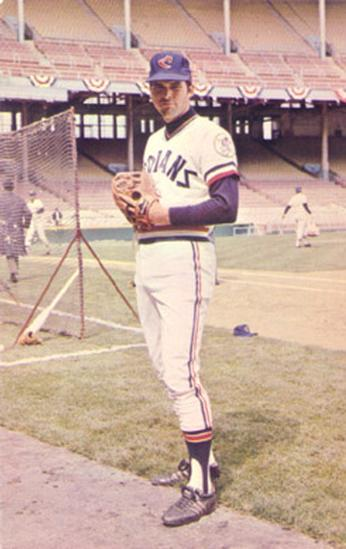
- Pitcher
- Born: May 14, 1947; San Francisco, California, U.S.
- Died: July 10, 2021 (aged 74); Lee's Summit, Missouri, U.S.
- Batted: Right Threw: Right

MLB debut
- April 18, 1972, for the Cleveland Indians

Last MLB appearance
- May 7, 1984, for the New York Mets

MLB statistics
- Win–loss record: 100–94
- Earned run average: 3.68
- Strikeouts: 975
- Stats at Baseball Reference

Teams
- Cleveland Indians (1972–1974); New York Yankees (1974–1979); Chicago Cubs (1979–1982); Chicago White Sox (1983); New York Mets (1984)

Career highlights and awards
- 2× World Series champion (1977, 1978)

Richard William Tidrow (May 14, 1947 – July 10, 2021) was an American professional baseball pitcher and the senior vice president of player personnel and senior advisor to the general manager for the San Francisco Giants of Major League Baseball (MLB).

Originally a starting pitcher when he came up to MLB with the Cleveland Indians in 1972, he was moved into the bullpen by New York Yankees manager Bill Virdon toward the end of the 1974 season. He acquired his nickname, "Dirt", while playing for the Yankees, for his somewhat unkempt appearance and his tendency to get his uniform shirt dirty even before the start of a game.

== Early life ==
Tidrow was born in San Francisco on May 14, 1947. Drafted his senior year at Mount Eden High School in Hayward, California, by the Washington Senators in the seventeenth round of the 1965 Major League Baseball draft, he decided instead to attend nearby Chabot College. He was also drafted by his hometown San Francisco Giants and the Cincinnati Reds, but opted not to sign with either club. The Cleveland Indians selected him in the fourth round of the January 1967 secondary draft. He signed with them on May 13, 1967. Tidrow also served in the U.S. Marine Corps from 1968 to 1971.

== Professional career ==
=== Cleveland Indians ===
Over five seasons in the Indians' farm system, Tidrow compiled a 33–20 record, with a 3.65 earned run average and 441 strikeouts before joining the major league roster out of spring training in 1972. He made his MLB debut on April 18, 1972, at the age of 24, giving up four earned runs and striking out one over one inning before being charged with the 4–2 loss to the Boston Red Sox. His second start against the Baltimore Orioles saw him pitch five scoreless innings before surrendering a two-run home run to Terry Crowley in the sixth. The Indians ultimately won 9–2 for Tidrow's first major league win. Facing the Yankees on May 17, Tidrow allowed a first inning solo home run to Bobby Murcer but held the Yankees scoreless for the remaining eight innings for his first career complete game, and to improve his record to 4–2. Tidrow then lost six of his next seven starts with a 7.87 ERA. After a couple of relief appearances, he pitched his first career shutout against the Texas Rangers on July 15. He then pitched consecutive 1–0 shutouts on July 31 and August 4. Overall, Tidrow compiled a 14–15 win–loss record with a 2.77 ERA in his rookie year.

The following season saw Tidrow throw a two-hit shutout of the Oakland Athletics on April 25 for his second win of the season. Tidrow allowed a lead off single to Bert Campaneris, then only allowed one more hit and three walks the rest of the game. The losing starter for the A's was Rollie Fingers. Three games into the 1974 season, Tidrow was 1–2 with an 8.36 ERA. He allowed two unearned runs in the first inning of his fourth start of the season, and two more in the fifth for his third loss of the season. Two days later, he, first baseman Chris Chambliss, and pitcher Cecil Upshaw were traded to the Yankees for pitchers Fred Beene, Tom Buskey, Steve Kline, and Fritz Peterson.

=== New York Yankees ===
Although the Yankees were initially criticized for the aforementioned trade with the Indians, with the deal nicknamed "The Friday Night Massacre", it ultimately turned out in their favor. As the season progressed, Tidrow gained more opportunities out of the bullpen. His record in 1974 as a starter for the Yankees was 9–9 with a 4.17 ERA and as a reliever for the Yankees in 1974 was 2–0 with a 2.45 ERA, and Tidrow earned his first career save on September 12 against the Orioles.

Tidrow appeared in 37 games, all in relief, during the 1975 season. With he and Sparky Lyle at the top of their bullpen, the Yankees' bullpen had a 3.19 ERA and twenty saves. For his part, Tidrow had a 3.12 ERA and six of the bullpen's twelve wins. He was primarily known as a setup man (the pitcher who would come on before the closer), however, he closed 23 games, and earned five saves.

The 1976 Yankees' bullpen was more dominant than the previous season's. Yankees' relievers had a 2.56 ERA and held opposing batters to a .224 average. Tidrow was 3–5 with a 2.67 ERA and ten saves over 77.2 innings out of the Yankees' bullpen. He also made two emergency starts, both in the second game of doubleheaders, and in both cases, he pitched exceptionally. Against the Milwaukee Brewers on June 27, Tidrow pitched seven innings and allowing two runs for his third win of the season. On July 6, he exited in the eighth inning after the Kansas City Royals tied the score at two. The Yankees scored five in the bottom of the eighth for the win.

The 1976 Yankees took Tidrow to the postseason for the first time in his career. He appeared in three games of the 1976 American League Championship Series with the Kansas City Royals, winning the decisive game five. He also appeared in two games of the 1976 World Series against Cincinnati's "Big Red Machine." He pitched two innings of scoreless ball in game three; in game four, he surrendered a ninth-inning three-run home run to Johnny Bench that cemented the Reds' four-game sweep of the Series.

==== World Series champion ====
In 1977, Sparky Lyle became the first American League reliever to win the Cy Young Award. As the setup man in the Yankees bullpen, Tidrow was 6–4 with a 3.54 ERA and five saves. His 104.1 innings as a reliever were second on the team to Lyle's 137.

In late August, with injuries to Catfish Hunter and Don Gullett, Tidrow was moved into the starting rotation. In seven starts, he went 5–0 with a 2.31 ERA. The team also won both of his no decisions, in which he pitched 14.1 innings, and allowed four earned runs. His performance helped the Yankees surge from third place, 4 1/2 games back of the Red Sox, to first place, and a second consecutive trip to the postseason.

Tidrow was back in the bullpen for the American League Championship Series, as the Yankees faced the Royals for a second year in a row. Gullett, who had been dominant since his return to the rotation (4–1, 2.48 ERA, 3 complete games in September), lasted just two innings in game one, and was tagged for four runs. Tidrow took over, and pitched into the ninth, allowing three more runs. He also faced three batters in game four, giving up a double, a ground out and a walk. In the 1977 World Series, Tidrow appeared in two games, and served up a two-run home run to Reggie Smith in 3 2/3 innings of work.

Following their World Series victory, the Yankees improved their bullpen by signing free agent closers Rich Gossage and Rawly Eastwick. Tidrow had off season surgery. When he returned, he was added to the starting rotation.

Through May, the Red Sox, Detroit Tigers, and Yankees were involved in a three-way race atop the American League East. On May 25, Tidrow pitched a complete game victory over the Indians. He went on to lose each of his next three decisions, and the Yankees lost both of his no decisions. The Yankees mounted a comeback to conclude their 162-game schedule with an identical 99–63 record as the Red Sox, forcing the first tiebreaker playoff game in the AL since 1948. Tidrow, however, had an off-year. In 25 starts, he was 7–10 with a 3.83 ERA. He made six relief appearances, and was 0–1 with a 3.91 ERA.

The Yankees defeated the Royals in the 1978 American League Championship Series for the third year in a row to face the Los Angeles Dodgers in the World Series a second year in a row. Tidrow returned to the bullpen for the postseason. As was the case a year before in game one of the ALCS, Tidrow was used as an "Innings eater" in game two of the ALCS when the starter got knocked out early. Light-hitting Royals shortstop Freddie Patek, who had two home runs during the regular season, homered off Tidrow. In the 1978 World Series, Tidrow made two relief appearances. One of his best postseason performances came in game four. Entering the game in the sixth inning with the Yankees trailing 3–0, Tidrow struck out four in pitching three innings of scoreless ball. The Yankees, meanwhile, scored two in the sixth and another in the eighth to tie the game, and eventually won it in extra innings.

=== Chicago Cubs ===
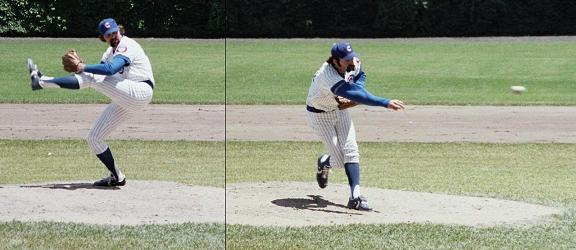
Pitching for the Cubs in 1981

Tidrow began the 1979 season poorly. He was 2–1 with two saves, but a high 7.94 ERA when he was dealt to the Chicago Cubs for Ray Burris.

In his National League debut, Tidrow pitched two innings of scoreless relief against the New York Mets. In his second game as a Cub, Tidrow pitched three hitless innings for his first NL save. In his third game, he earned his first win. He entered in relief of Mike Krukow in the third inning, and after allowing a run in his first inning of work, he held the Philadelphia Phillies scoreless for four innings. While Burris performed poorly with the Yankees (1–3, 6.18 ERA, before being placed on waivers in late August), the change of scenery unquestionably helped Tidrow. He became manager Herman Franks' favorite long reliever in front of Hall of Fame closer Bruce Sutter. On July 27, Tidrow was the winning pitcher in the Cubs' 4–2 win over the Mets, with Sutter earning the save. The victory brought the Cubs within a half game of the first place Montreal Expos. Tidrow and Sutter were a combined 11–3 with twenty saves and a 1.67 ERA since Tidrow's arrival in Chicago. Tidrow ultimately led Cubs' relievers with 102.2 innings, 63 appearances and eleven wins, even though he only joined the team in late May.

The one strong aspect of the 98-loss 1980 Cubs team was its bullpen. Along with Sutter and Tidrow, it featured Bill Caudill (4–6, 1 save, 2.10 ERA, 115.2 IP) and a rookie Lee Smith. Tidrow pitched 10.1 innings before allowing his first earned run, with one of his strongest performances that season coming in the April 19 victory over the Mets. He entered in the seventh with the Cubs trailing 9–5. He pitched two innings of one hit ball, while his team mounted an eighth-inning comeback. From May 11 to 14, Tidrow appeared in all four games without a day's rest. He pitched six innings, and allowed just one hit. For the season, he was 6–5 with a 2.79 ERA and six saves, and led Major League Baseball with 84 relief appearances.

Tidrow was handed the reins to the bullpen for 1981, as Sutter was dealt to the St. Louis Cardinals during the off season. His new role as the top arm in the Cubs' bullpen turned out to be overwhelming for Tidrow. After earning his first win against the Mets on April 11, Tidrow blew a save and lost to the Expos in his next appearance. He would blow a second save and lose again on April 25 against the Phillies before finally earning his first save on May 2. Through the players' strike, Tidrow went 2–4 with a 4.29 ERA and only six saves.

The lay off from the strike only made his season worse. When play resumed, he blew his first save opportunity, then lost his next two games in a row. In the second half of the season, he had a 1–6 record with a 6.06 ERA, and had just three saves.

Tidrow also began the 1982 season poorly. By his 35th birthday, he had been relegated to "mop-up duty"; he had a 4.96 ERA, and opposing hitters were batting .389. He won his first game on May 21, and progressively got better as the season went on (2–0, 3.33 ERA in June; 1–1, 2 SV, 2.82 ERA in July; 2–0, 3 SV, 2.40 ERA in August). He returned to his setup man role by the end of July and ended the season at 8–3 with a 3.39 ERA and six saves. He led his team with 103 2/3 innings pitched in relief.

=== Chicago White Sox ===
During the off season, the Cubs engineered a trade with their crosstown rival Chicago White Sox, sending Tidrow, Scott Fletcher, Randy Martz, and Pat Tabler to the ChiSox for pitchers Warren Brusstar and Steve Trout. Once again, Tidrow was the horse of his team's bullpen, with seven saves and a 4.26 ERA in a team-leading 88.2 innings of relief. He also made a start for the first time in five years.

Tidrow seemed to always be on the wrong end of hard luck losses his one season with the White Sox. His first loss on June 10, Tidrow entered in the twelfth inning of a sixteen-inning marathon with the Oakland A's, and pitched four innings of one-hit ball. With runners on first and third and two outs in the sixteenth inning, Tidrow induced what should have been an inning-ending groundball from A's slugger Jeff Burroughs. Instead, shortstop Jerry Dybzinski booted it, allowing the winning run to score. He suffered his second loss against the Indians. He entered a tie game, and pitched 3.1 innings of one-hit relief. His one mistake pitch was knocked deep into the left field seats by Andre Thornton. He also allowed just one hit in his third loss, while pitching 2.2 innings. In his final loss, he did not allow any in two innings pitched. All told, Tidrow held batters to a .100 batting average, and had a 2.13 ERA in his four losses.

The White Sox won 99 games to take Tidrow to the postseason for the fourth time in his career. He made one appearance in the 1983 American League Championship Series. He entered in the sixth inning of game three with the Sox trailing the Orioles 6–1. He allowed one run in three innings.

=== New York Mets ===
Tidrow signed as a free agent with the Mets for the 1984 season. He pitched a scoreless inning in the season opener, He made eleven appearances with a 9.19 ERA before playing his final major league game on May 7, 1984, one week before his 37th birthday. He was subsequently released by the Mets. Tidrow finished his overall career with a record of 100-94 and 975 strikeouts.

== Post-playing career ==
After retiring as a player, Tidrow went back to the Yankees as a special assignment scout from 1985 to 1993. He subsequently joined the San Francisco Giants a year later. He initially acted as their American League scout. He was promoted to special assistant to the general manager in 1996 and director of player personnel in 1997.

Along with general manager Brian Sabean, Tidrow built a ballclub that appeared in four World Series, winning three championships (2010, 2012, and 2014) within a span of five seasons. He oversaw a farm system that produced Tim Lincecum, Matt Cain, Madison Bumgarner, Sergio Romo, Pablo Sandoval, and Buster Posey. Tidrow was a senior advisor to the president of baseball operations for the Giants prior to his death.

== Personal life ==
In 1967, Tidrow married Susan Keeler. Together they had two children, Tammy Lee Tidrow and Richard William Tidrow Jr. They divorced in 1975. Tidrow was married to Mari Jo from 1976 until his death. Together, they had three children: Andy, Matt, and Richelle. He had five grandchildren. Riley, Carly, Trista, Marley and Waylon.

Tidrow died on July 10, 2021, in Lee's Summit, Missouri. He was 74 years old.
