= Charley Justice =

American baseball player

- Outfielder
- Born: September 13, 1913; Milledgeville, Georgia, U.S.
- Died: November 4, 1974 (aged 61); Ann Arbor, Michigan, U.S.
- Batted: Right Threw: Right

Negro league baseball debut
- 1933, for the Akron Black Tyrites

Last appearance
- 1937, for the Detroit Stars

Teams
- Cleveland Giants (1933); Detroit Stars (1937)

Charles Pell Justice (September 13, 1913 – November 4, 1974) was an American professional baseball outfielder in the Negro leagues. He played with the Cleveland Giants in 1933 and the Detroit Stars in 1937.
