= Tom Buskey =

American baseball player (1947–1998)

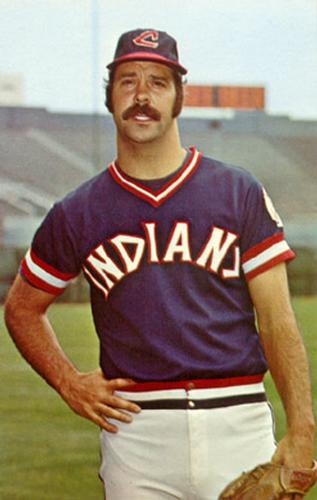
- Pitcher
- Born: February 20, 1947; Harrisburg, Pennsylvania, U.S.
- Died: June 7, 1998 (aged 51); Harrisburg, Pennsylvania, U.S.
- Batted: Right Threw: Right

MLB debut
- August 5, 1973, for the New York Yankees

Last MLB appearance
- August 4, 1980, for the Toronto Blue Jays

MLB statistics
- Win–loss record: 21–27
- Earned run average: 3.66
- Strikeouts: 212
- Stats at Baseball Reference

Teams
- New York Yankees (1973–1974); Cleveland Indians (1974–1977); Toronto Blue Jays (1978–1980)

Thomas William Buskey (February 20, 1947 – June 7, 1998) was an American Major League Baseball middle relief pitcher. Listed at 6' 3", 200 lb., he batted and threw right handed.

== Career ==
Born in Harrisburg, Pennsylvania, Buskey attended Harrisburg High School, then the University of North Carolina at Chapel Hill. He entered the majors with the New York Yankees in 1973, playing for them one and a half seasons before joining the Cleveland Indians (1974–1977) and the Toronto Blue Jays (1978–1980).

He was traded along with Fritz Peterson, Steve Kline, and Fred Beene from the Yankees to the Indians for Chris Chambliss, Dick Tidrow, and Cecil Upshaw on April 26, 1974.

In an eight-season career, Buskey posted a 21–27 record with a 3.66 earned run average and 34 saves in 258 relief appearances, striking out 212 batters while walking 167 in 479⅓ innings of work.

He also pitched in the Minor Leagues over parts of eight seasons spanning 1969–1979, going 49–42 with a 2.77 ERA and 23 saves in 183 games, including 74 starts, 37 complete games, seven shutouts, 474 strikeouts, and 186 walks in 768 innings.

Additionally, Buskey played winter baseball with the Leones del Caracas club of the Venezuelan League in the 1974–1975 season, as he went 6–4 with a 2.19 ERA and eight saves in 28 relief games.

After baseball, Buskey was involved with the Susquehanna Employment and Training Corporation, where he was cited as a contributor to technical and career special education in 1997. He died in 1998 at the age of 51, following complications from a heart attack in his home.
