= Fred Beene =

American baseball player (born 1942)

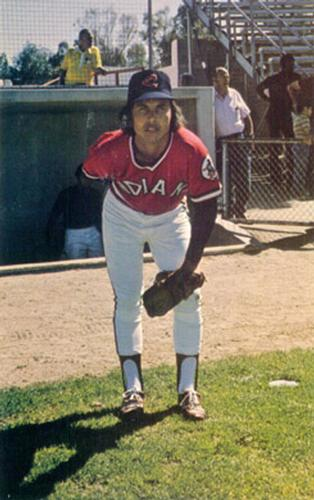
- Pitcher
- Born: November 24, 1942 (age 83); Angleton, Texas, U.S.
- Batted: Right Threw: Right

MLB debut
- September 18, 1968, for the Baltimore Orioles

Last MLB appearance
- September 28, 1975, for the Cleveland Indians

MLB statistics
- Win–loss record: 12–7
- Earned run average: 3.63
- Strikeouts: 156
- Stats at Baseball Reference

Teams
- Baltimore Orioles (1968–1970); New York Yankees (1972–1974); Cleveland Indians (1974–1975)

Freddy Ray Beene (born November 24, 1942) is an American former professional baseball player. Beene was a right-handed pitcher who played in the Major Leagues between 1968 and 1975. He was listed at 5 feet 9 inches (1.75 m) tall and 155 pounds (70 kg).

Beene attended Brazosport High School in Freeport, Texas then played college baseball at Sam Houston State University. In performance in the small college World Series convinced Orioles scout Dee Phillips to sign him for $6,000 in 1964. Beene played with Baltimore's minor league system until 1968 and made his major league debut in September 18 of that year. He played in eight games over three seasons with the Orioles who traded him along with Enzo Hernández, Tom Phoebus and Al Severinsen to the San Diego Padres for Pat Dobson and Tom Dukes on December 1, 1970. Beene was returned to the Orioles 5 1/2 months later on May 16, 1971. In 1972, he was traded to the New York Yankees for a player to be named later, which turned out to be Dale Spier. Beene pitched very well for the Yankees, having earned run averages under 2.50. He was dealt along with Fritz Peterson, Steve Kline and Tom Buskey from the Yankees to the Indians for Chris Chambliss, Dick Tidrow and Cecil Upshaw on April 26, 1974.

Beene appeared in 112 MLB games played, all but six as a relief pitcher. In 288 innings, he allowed 274 hits and 111 bases on balls, with 156 strikeouts. Primarily a middle reliever, Beene notched eight career saves, and compiled a career earned run average of 3.63.

After his playing career, Beene spent 20 seasons (1981–2000) as a scout for the Milwaukee Brewers. One of the players he talked the Brewers into drafting was Jim Morris in 1983, who would make his major league debut 16 years later.
