= 1972 Chicago White Sox season =

1972 Chicago White Sox
- League: American League
- Division: West
- Ballpark: Comiskey Park
- City: Chicago
- Owners: Arthur Allyn, Jr. and John Allyn
- General managers: Stu Holcomb, Roland Hemond
- Managers: Chuck Tanner
- Television: WFLD (Jack Drees, Bud Kelly)
- Radio: WMAQ (AM) (Harry Caray, Ralph Faucher)

The 1972 Chicago White Sox season was the White Sox's 73rd season overall, and 72nd in the American League. They finished with a record of 87–67, good enough for second place in the American League West, 5 1/2 games behind the first-place Oakland Athletics.

== Offseason ==
- October 22, 1971: Lowell Palmer was purchased by the White Sox from the Philadelphia Phillies.
- December 2, 1971: Tommy John and Steve Huntz were traded by the White Sox to the Los Angeles Dodgers for Dick Allen.
- December 2, 1971: Rich McKinney was traded by the White Sox to the New York Yankees for Stan Bahnsen.
- December 14, 1971: Pat Jacquez was traded by the White Sox to the Cincinnati Reds for Jim Qualls.

== Regular season ==
- July 31, 1972: Dick Allen hit two inside-the-park home runs in one game against the Minnesota Twins.

=== Season standings ===
AL West
Team	W	L	Pct.	GB	Home	Road
Oakland Athletics	93	62	.600	—	48‍–‍29	45‍–‍33
Chicago White Sox	87	67	.565	5½	55‍–‍23	32‍–‍44
Minnesota Twins	77	77	.500	15½	42‍–‍32	35‍–‍45
Kansas City Royals	76	78	.494	16½	44‍–‍33	32‍–‍45
California Angels	75	80	.484	18	44‍–‍36	31‍–‍44
Texas Rangers	54	100	.351	38½	31‍–‍46	23‍–‍54

=== Record vs. opponents ===
1972 American League records Sources:
Team	BAL	BOS	CAL	CWS	CLE	DET	KC	MIL	MIN	NYY	OAK	TEX
Baltimore	—	7–11	6–6	8–4	8–10	10–8	6–6	10–5	6–6	7–6	6–6	6–6
Boston	11–7	—	8–4	6–6	8–7	5–9	6–6	11–7	4–8	9–9	9–3	8–4
California	6–6	4–8	—	7–11	8–4	5–7	9–6	7–5	7–8	4–8	8–10	10–7
Chicago	4–8	6–6	11–7	—	8–4	5–7	8–9	9–3	8–6	7–5	7–8	14–4
Cleveland	10–8	7–8	4–8	4–8	—	10–8	6–6	5–10	8–4	7–11	2–10	9–3
Detroit	8–10	9–5	7–5	7–5	8–10	—	7–5	10–8	9–3	7–9	4–8	10–2
Kansas City	6–6	6–6	6–9	9–8	6–6	5–7	—	7–5	9–9	7–5	7–11	8–6
Milwaukee	5–10	7–11	5–7	3–9	10–5	8–10	5–7	—	4–8	9–9	4–8	5–7
Minnesota	6–6	8–4	8–7	6–8	4–8	3–9	9–9	8–4	—	6–6	8–9	11–7
New York	6–7	9–9	8–4	5–7	11–7	9–7	5–7	9–9	6–6	—	3–9	8–4
Oakland	6–6	3–9	10–8	8–7	10–2	8–4	11–7	8–4	9–8	9–3	—	11–4
Texas	6–6	4–8	7–10	4–14	3–9	2–10	6–8	7–5	7–11	4–8	4–11	—

=== Opening Day lineup ===
- Walt Williams, RF
- Mike Andrews, 2B
- Dick Allen, 1B
- Bill Melton, 3B
- Carlos May, LF
- Rick Reichardt, CF
- Ed Herrmann, C
- Luis Alvarado, SS
- Wilbur Wood, P

=== Notable transactions ===
- May 16, 1972: Lowell Palmer was released by the White Sox.
- June 6, 1972: Nyls Nyman was drafted by the White Sox in the 16th round of the 1972 Major League Baseball draft.
- June 16, 1972: Jim Qualls was released by the White Sox.
- August 17, 1972: Eddie Fisher was traded by the California Angels to the Chicago White Sox for a player to be named later and Bruce Miller. The Chicago White Sox sent Bruce Kimm (September 1, 1972) to the California Angels to complete the trade.
- September 1, 1972: Hank Allen was signed as a free agent by the White Sox.

=== Roster ===
1972 Chicago White Sox
Roster
Pitchers: 41 Cy Acosta; 45 Stan Bahnsen; 24 Tom Bradley; 44 Moe Drabowsky; 34 Eddie Fisher; 51 Terry Forster; 47 Ken Frailing; 55 Jim Geddes; 54 Goose Gossage; 21 Bart Johnson; 23 Steve Kealey; 43 Dave Lemonds; 39 Dan Neumeier; 52 Dennis O'Toole; 38 Phil Regan; 27 Vicente Romo; 28 Wilbur Wood	Catchers: 11 Chuck Brinkman; 8 Tom Egan; 12 Ed Herrmann; Infielders: 15 Dick Allen; 42 Hank Allen; 1 Luis Alvarado; 2 Mike Andrews; 19 Rudy Hernández; 14 Bill Melton; 30 Rich Morales; 25 Tony Muser; 6 Jorge Orta; 5 Ed Spiezio; 20 Hugh Yancy	Outfielders: 22 Buddy Bradford; 10 Jay Johnstone; 18 Pat Kelly; 26 Jim Lyttle; 17 Carlos May; 19 Jim Qualls; 48 Rick Reichardt; 9 Lee Richard; 3 Walt Williams	Manager: 7 Chuck Tanner; Coaches: 37 Joe Lonnett; 31 Jim Mahoney; 35 Alex Monchak; 33 Johnny Sain

== Player stats ==
= Indicates team leader

= Indicates league leader

=== Batting ===
Note: G = Games played; AB = At bats; R = Runs scored; H = Hits; 2B = Doubles; 3B = Triples; HR = Home runs; RBI = Runs batted in; BB = Base on balls; SO = Strikeouts; AVG = Batting average; SB = Stolen bases

Player	G	AB	R	H	2B	3B	HR	RBI	BB	SO	AVG	SB
Dick Allen, 1B	148	506	90	156	28	5	37	113	99	126	.308	19
Hank Allen, 3B	9	21	1	3	2	0	0	0	0	2	.143	0
Luis Alvarado, SS, 2B	103	254	30	54	4	1	4	29	13	36	.213	2
Mike Andrews, 2B, 1B	148	505	58	111	18	0	7	50	70	78	.220	2
Buddy Bradford, OF	35	48	13	13	2	0	2	8	4	13	.271	3
Chuck Brinkman, C	35	52	1	7	0	0	0	0	4	7	.135	0
Tom Egan, C	50	141	8	27	3	0	2	9	4	48	.191	0
Rudy Hernandez, SS	8	21	0	4	0	0	0	1	0	3	.190	0
Ed Herrmann, C	116	354	23	88	9	0	10	40	43	37	.249	0
Jay Johnstone, OF	113	261	27	49	9	0	4	17	25	42	.188	2
Pat Kelly, RF	119	402	57	105	14	7	5	24	55	69	.261	32
Jim Lyttle, CF, RF	44	82	8	19	5	2	0	5	1	28	.232	0
Carlos May, LF, 1B	148	523	83	161	26	3	12	68	79	70	.308	23
Bill Melton, 3B	57	208	22	51	5	0	7	30	23	31	.245	1
Rich Morales, SS, 3B, 2B	110	287	24	59	7	1	2	20	19	49	.206	2
Tony Muser, 1B	44	61	6	17	2	2	1	9	2	6	.279	1
Jorge Orta, SS, 2B, 3B	51	124	20	25	3	1	3	11	6	37	.202	3
Jim Qualls, CF	11	12	0	0	0	0	0	0	0	2	.000	0
Rick Reichardt, CF, LF	101	291	31	73	14	4	8	43	28	63	.251	2
Lee Richard, CF	11	29	5	7	0	0	0	1	0	7	.241	1
Ed Spiezio, 3B	74	277	20	66	10	1	2	22	13	43	.238	0
Walt Williams, RF	77	221	22	55	7	1	2	11	13	20	.249	6
Hugh Yancy, 3B	3	9	0	1	0	0	0	0	0	0	.111	0

Player	G	AB	R	H	2B	3B	HR	RBI	BB	SO	AVG	SB
Cy Acosta, P	26	4	0	0	0	0	0	0	0	3	.000	0
Stan Bahnsen, P	44	92	5	14	2	0	0	2	1	38	.152	0
Tom Bradley, P	43	91	1	12	2	0	0	3	1	34	.132	0
Moe Drabowsky, P	7	1	0	0	0	0	0	0	0	0	.000	0
Eddie Fisher, P	6	7	0	0	0	0	0	0	0	0	.000	0
Terry Forster, P	63	19	1	10	0	0	0	3	1	2	.526	1
Jim Geddes, P	6	1	1	0	0	0	0	0	0	0	.000	0
Goose Gossage, P	36	16	0	0	0	0	0	0	0	11	.000	0
Bart Johnson, P	9	1	0	0	0	0	0	0	0	0	.000	0
Steve Kealey, P	40	3	0	0	0	0	0	0	0	2	.000	0
Dave Lemonds, P	34	25	1	3	0	0	0	2	1	16	.120	0
Dan Neumeier, P	3	1	0	0	0	0	0	0	0	1	.000	0
Phil Regan, P	10	1	0	1	0	0	0	0	0	0	1.000	0
Vicente Romo, P	28	9	0	0	0	0	0	0	0	2	.000	0
Wilbur Wood, P	49	125	8	17	0	0	0	7	6	65	.136	0
Team totals	154	5083	566	1208	170	28	108	528	511	991	.238	100

=== Pitching ===
Note: W = Wins; L = Losses; ERA = Earned run average; G = Games pitched; GS = Games started; SV = Saves; IP = Innings pitched; H = Hits allowed; R = Runs allowed; ER = Earned runs allowed; HR = Home runs allowed; BB = Walks allowed; K = Strikeouts

Player	W	L	ERA	G	GS	SV	IP	H	R	ER	HR	BB	K
Cy Acosta	3	0	1.56	26	0	5	34.2	25	6	6	2	20	28
Stan Bahnsen	21	16	3.60	43	41	0	252.1	263	107	101	22	74	157
Tom Bradley	15	14	2.98	40	40	0	260.0	225	94	86	19	69	209
Moe Drabowsky	0	0	2.45	7	0	0	7.1	6	2	2	0	2	4
Eddie Fisher	0	1	4.43	6	4	0	22.1	31	13	11	1	9	10
Terry Forster	6	5	2.25	62	0	29	100.0	75	31	25	0	47	104
Ken Frailing	1	0	3.00	4	0	0	3.0	3	1	1	1	1	1
Jim Geddes	0	0	6.97	5	1	0	10.1	12	9	8	1	10	3
Goose Gossage	7	1	4.28	36	1	2	80.0	72	44	38	2	47	57
Bart Johnson	0	3	9.22	9	0	1	13.2	18	20	14	2	15	9
Steve Kealey	3	2	3.30	40	0	4	57.1	50	21	21	4	13	37
Dave Lemonds	4	7	2.95	31	18	0	94.2	87	39	31	6	41	69
Dan Neumeier	0	0	9.00	3	0	0	3.0	2	3	3	0	3	0
Denny O'Toole	0	0	5.40	3	0	0	5.0	10	3	3	0	2	5
Phil Regan	0	1	4.05	10	0	0	13.1	18	7	6	1	8	4
Vicente Romo	3	0	3.31	28	0	1	51.2	47	19	19	5	20	46
Wilbur Wood	24*	17	2.51	49	49	0	376.2	325	119	105	28	79	193
Team totals	87	67	3.12	154	154	42	1385.1	1269	538	480	94	460	936

- Tied for League lead

== Farm system ==
Level	Team	League	Manager
AAA	Tucson Toros	Pacific Coast League	Larry Sherry
AA	Knoxville White Sox	Southern League	Joe Sparks
A	Appleton Foxes	Midwest League	Bert Thiel
Rookie	GCL White Sox	Gulf Coast League	Joe Jones
