= 1973 Chicago White Sox season =

1973 Chicago White Sox
- League: American League
- Division: West
- Ballpark: Comiskey Park
- City: Chicago
- Owners: Arthur Allyn, Jr. and John Allyn
- General managers: Roland Hemond
- Managers: Chuck Tanner
- Television: WSNS-TV 44 (Harry Caray, Bob Waller)
- Radio: WMAQ–AM 670 (Harry Caray, Gene Osborn)

The 1973 Chicago White Sox season was the team's 73rd season in the major leagues, and its 74th season overall. They finished with a record 77–85, good enough for fifth place in the American League West, 17 games behind the first-place Oakland Athletics.

== Offseason ==
- October 19, 1972: Walt Williams was traded by the White Sox to the Cleveland Indians for Eddie Leon.
- February 1, 1973: Jim Lyttle was traded by the White Sox to the Kansas City Royals for Joe Keough.
- February 7, 1973: Chuck Hartenstein and Glenn Redmon were traded by the White Sox to the San Francisco Giants for Skip Pitlock.

== Regular season ==
- July 20, 1973: Wilbur Wood became the last pitcher in the 20th century to start both ends of a doubleheader.

=== Opening Day lineup ===
- Pat Kelly, RF
- Carlos May, LF
- Dick Allen, 1B
- Bill Melton, 3B
- Ken Henderson, CF
- Mike Andrews, DH
- Ed Herrmann, C
- Jorge Orta, 2B
- Eddie Leon, SS
- Wilbur Wood, P

=== Season standings ===
AL West
Team	W	L	Pct.	GB	Home	Road
Oakland Athletics	94	68	.580	—	50‍–‍31	44‍–‍37
Kansas City Royals	88	74	.543	6	48‍–‍33	40‍–‍41
Minnesota Twins	81	81	.500	13	37‍–‍44	44‍–‍37
California Angels	79	83	.488	15	43‍–‍38	36‍–‍45
Chicago White Sox	77	85	.475	17	40‍–‍41	37‍–‍44
Texas Rangers	57	105	.352	37	35‍–‍46	22‍–‍59

=== Record vs. opponents ===
1973 American League record Sources:
Team	BAL	BOS	CAL	CWS	CLE	DET	KC	MIL	MIN	NYY	OAK	TEX
Baltimore	—	7–11	6–6	8–4	12–6	9–9	8–4	15–3	8–4	9–9	5–7	10–2
Boston	11–7	—	7–5	6–6	9–9	3–15	8–4	12–6	6–6	14–4	4–8	9–3
California	6–6	5–7	—	8–10	5–7	7–5	10–8	5–7	10–8	6–6	6–12	11–7
Chicago	4–8	6–6	10–8	—	7–5	5–7	6–12	3–9	9–9	8–4	6–12	13–5
Cleveland	6–12	9–9	7–5	5–7	—	9–9	2–10	9–9	7–5	7–11	3–9	7–5
Detroit	9–9	15–3	5–7	7–5	9–9	—	4–8	12–6	5–7	7–11	7–5	5–7
Kansas City	4–8	4–8	8–10	12–6	10–2	8–4	—	8–4	9–9	6–6	8–10	11–7
Milwaukee	3–15	6–12	7–5	9–3	9–9	6–12	4–8	—	8–4	10–8	4–8	8–4
Minnesota	4–8	6–6	8–10	9–9	5–7	7–5	9–9	4–8	—	3–9	14–4	12–6
New York	9–9	4–14	6–6	4–8	11–7	11–7	6–6	8–10	9–3	—	4–8	8–4
Oakland	7–5	8–4	12–6	12–6	9–3	5–7	10–8	8–4	4–14	8–4	—	11–7
Texas	2–10	3–9	7–11	5–13	5–7	7–5	7–11	4–8	6–12	4–8	7–11	—

=== Notable transactions ===
- August 15, 1973: Jim Kaat was selected off waivers by the White Sox from the Minnesota Twins.
- August 29, 1973: Eddie Fisher was purchased by the St. Louis Cardinals from the Chicago White Sox.

=== Roster ===
1973 Chicago White Sox
Roster
Pitchers: 41 Cy Acosta; 45 Stan Bahnsen; 26 Dave Baldwin; 34 Eddie Fisher; 51 Terry Forster; 47 Ken Frailing; 55 Jim Geddes; 54 Goose Gossage; 21 Bart Johnson; 36 Jim Kaat; 23 Steve Kealey; 40 Jim McGlothlin; 52 Dennis O'Toole; 32 Steve Stone; 28 Wilbur Wood	Catchers: 11 Chuck Brinkman; 12 Ed Herrmann; 8 Pete Varney; Infielders: 15 Dick Allen; 42 Hank Allen; 1 Luis Alvarado; 2 Mike Andrews; 30 Bucky Dent; 10 Sam Ewing; 3 Eddie Leon; 14 Bill Melton; 30 Rich Morales; 25 Tony Muser; 6 Jorge Orta	Outfielders: 22 Buddy Bradford; 16 Brian Downing; 2,30 Jerry Hairston; 24 Ken Henderson; 20 Johnny Jeter; 18 Pat Kelly; 17 Carlos May; 48 Rick Reichardt; 5 Bill Sharp; Other batters: 46 Joe Keough	Manager: 7 Chuck Tanner; Coaches: 37 Joe Lonnett; 31 Jim Mahoney; 35 Alex Monchak; 33 Johnny Sain

== Game log ==
=== Regular season ===
Legend
	White Sox win
	White Sox loss
	Postponement
	Eliminated from playoff race
**Bold**	White Sox team member

1973 regular season game log: 77–85 (Home: 40–41; Away: 37–44)
April: 10–5 (Home: 3–4; Away: 7–1)

#	Date	Time (CT)	Opponent	Score	Win	Loss	Save	Time of Game	Attendance	Record	Streak

May: 17–10 (Home: 13–6; Away: 4–4)

#	Date	Time (CT)	Opponent	Score	Win	Loss	Save	Time of Game	Attendance	Record	Streak

June: 11–18 (Home: 4–9; Away: 7–9)

#	Date	Time (CT)	Opponent	Score	Win	Loss	Save	Time of Game	Attendance	Record	Streak

July: 14–20 (Home: 4–8; Away: 10–12)

#	Date	Time (CT)	Opponent	Score	Win	Loss	Save	Time of Game	Attendance	Record	Streak
—	July 24	7:15 p.m. CDT	**44th All-Star Game in Kansas City, MO**								

August: 12–17 (Home: 9–8; Away: 3–9)

#	Date	Time (CT)	Opponent	Score	Win	Loss	Save	Time of Game	Attendance	Record	Streak

September: 13–15 (Home: 7–6; Away: 6–9)

#	Date	Time (CT)	Opponent	Score	Win	Loss	Save	Time of Game	Attendance	Record	Streak

== Player stats ==
=== Batting ===
Note: G = Games played; AB = At bats; R = Runs scored; H = Hits; 2B = Doubles; 3B = Triples; HR = Home runs; RBI = Runs batted in; BB = Base on balls; SO = Strikeouts; AVG = Batting average; SB = Stolen bases

Player	G	AB	R	H	2B	3B	HR	RBI	BB	SO	AVG	SB
Cy Acosta, PH	1	1	0	0	0	0	0	0	0	1	.000	0
Dick Allen, 1B	72	250	39	79	20	3	16	41	33	51	.316	7
Hank Allen, 1B, LF	28	39	2	4	2	0	0	0	1	9	.103	0
Luis Alvarado, 2B, SS, 3B	80	203	21	47	7	2	0	20	4	20	.232	6
Mike Andrews, DH, 1B, 2B, 3B	52	159	10	32	9	0	0	10	23	28	.201	0
Buddy Bradford, CF	53	168	24	40	3	1	8	15	17	43	.238	4
Chuck Brinkman, C	63	139	13	26	6	0	1	10	11	37	.187	0
Bucky Dent, SS	40	117	17	29	2	0	0	10	10	18	.248	2
Brian Downing, C, 3B, RF, LF	34	73	5	13	1	0	2	4	10	17	.178	0
Sam Ewing, 1B	11	20	1	3	1	0	0	2	2	6	.150	0
Terry Forster, PH	1	1	0	0	0	0	0	0	0	0	.000	0
Jerry Hairston, LF, 1B, DH	60	210	25	57	11	1	0	23	33	30	.271	0
Ken Henderson, CF, DH, LF	73	262	32	68	13	0	6	32	27	49	.260	3
Ed Herrmann, C	119	379	42	85	17	1	10	39	31	55	.224	2
Johnny Jeter, OF	89	300	38	72	14	4	7	26	9	74	.240	4
Pat Kelly, RF	144	550	77	154	24	5	1	44	65	91	.280	22
Joe Keough, PH	5	1	1	0	0	0	0	0	0	0	.000	0
Eddie Leon, SS, 2B	127	399	37	91	10	3	3	30	34	103	.228	1
Carlos May, DH, LF	149	553	62	148	20	0	20	96	53	73	.268	8
Bill Melton, 3B	152	560	83	155	29	1	20	87	75	66	.277	4
Rich Morales, 3B, 2B	7	4	1	0	0	0	0	1	1	1	.000	0
Tony Muser, 1B, DH	109	309	38	88	14	3	4	30	33	36	.285	8
Jorge Orta, 2B, DH	128	425	46	113	9	10	6	40	37	87	.266	8
Rick Reichardt, LF, CF, DH	46	153	15	42	8	1	3	16	8	29	.275	2
Bill Sharp, CF, LF	77	196	23	54	8	3	4	22	19	28	.276	2
Pete Varney, C	5	4	0	0	0	0	0	0	1	0	.000	0
Team totals	162	5475	652	1400	228	38	111	598	537	952	.256	83

=== Pitching ===
Note: W = Wins; L = Losses; ERA = Earned run average; G = Games pitched; GS = Games started; SV = Saves; IP = Innings pitched; H = Hits allowed; R = Runs allowed; ER = Earned runs allowed; HR = Home runs allowed; BB = Walks allowed; K = Strikeouts

Player	W	L	ERA	G	GS	SV	IP	H	R	ER	HR	BB	K
Cy Acosta	10	6	2.23	48	0	18	97.0	66	30	24	8	42	60
Stan Bahnsen	18	21	3.57	42	42	0	282.1	290	128	112	20	119	120
Dave Baldwin	0	0	3.60	3	0	0	5.0	7	2	2	0	5	1
Eddie Fisher	6	7	4.88	26	16	0	110.2	135	64	60	12	39	57
Terry Forster	6	11	3.23	51	12	16	172.2	174	69	62	7	84	120
Ken Frailing	0	0	1.96	10	0	0	18.1	18	6	4	1	7	15
Jim Geddes	0	0	2.87	6	1	0	15.2	14	6	5	0	14	7
Goose Gossage	0	4	7.43	20	4	0	49.2	57	44	41	9	39	33
Bart Johnson	3	3	4.13	22	9	0	80.2	76	39	37	6	40	56
Jim Kaat	4	1	4.22	7	7	0	42.2	44	23	20	4	4	16
Steve Kealey	0	0	15.09	7	0	0	11.1	23	22	19	2	8	4
Jim McGlothlin	0	1	3.91	5	1	0	18.1	13	8	8	2	13	14
Denny O'Toole	0	0	5.63	6	0	0	16.0	23	11	10	3	3	8
Steve Stone	6	11	4.24	36	22	1	176.1	163	87	83	11	82	138
Wilbur Wood	24	20	3.46	49	48	0	359.1	381	166	138	25	94	199
Team totals	77	85	3.86	162	162	35	1456.0	1484	705	625	110	593	848

== Farm system ==
Level	Team	League	Manager
AAA	Iowa Oaks	American Association	Joe Sparks
AA	Knoxville White Sox	Southern League	Jim Napier
A	Appleton Foxes	Midwest League	Deacon Jones and Bert Thiel
Rookie	GCL White Sox	Gulf Coast League	Joe Jones

== Awards and honors ==
All-Star Game

- Pat Kelly, reserve
