= 1974 Chicago White Sox season =

1974 Chicago White Sox
- League: American League
- Division: West
- Ballpark: Comiskey Park
- City: Chicago
- Owners: Arthur Allyn, Jr. and John Allyn
- General managers: Roland Hemond
- Managers: Chuck Tanner
- Television: WSNS-TV (Harry Caray, Bob Waller)
- Radio: WMAQ (AM) (Harry Caray, Bill Mercer)

In 1974, the Chicago White Sox played their 74th season in the major leagues, and their 75th season overall. They finished with a record of 80–80, along with 3 ties, good enough for fourth place in the American League West, 9 games behind the first-place Oakland Athletics.

== Offseason ==
- October 14, 1973: Joe Keough was purchased from the White Sox by the Minnesota Twins.
- December 11, 1973: Steve Stone, Ken Frailing, Steve Swisher and a player to be named later were traded by the White Sox to the Chicago Cubs for Ron Santo. The White Sox completed the deal by sending Jim Kremmel to the Cubs on December 18.
- January 9, 1974: Kevin Bell was drafted by the White Sox in the 1st round of the 1974 Major League Baseball draft.
- January 16, 1974: John Lamb was purchased by the White Sox from the Pittsburgh Pirates.
- March 27, 1974: John Lamb was purchased from the White Sox by the Pirates.

== Regular season ==
=== Opening Day lineup ===
1. Pat Kelly, RF
2. Ken Henderson, CF
3. Dick Allen, 1B
4. Bill Melton, 3B
5. Carlos May, LF
6. Ron Santo, DH
7. Jorge Orta, 2B
8. Ed Herrmann, C
9. Bucky Dent, SS
- Wilbur Wood, P

=== Season standings ===
AL West
Team	W	L	Pct.	GB	Home	Road
Oakland Athletics	90	72	.556	—	49‍–‍32	41‍–‍40
Texas Rangers	84	76	.525	5	42‍–‍38	42‍–‍38
Minnesota Twins	82	80	.506	8	48‍–‍33	34‍–‍47
Chicago White Sox	80	80	.500	9	46‍–‍34	34‍–‍46
Kansas City Royals	77	85	.475	13	40‍–‍41	37‍–‍44
California Angels	68	94	.420	22	36‍–‍45	32‍–‍49

=== Record vs. opponents ===
1974 American League record Sources:
Team	BAL	BOS	CAL	CWS	CLE	DET	KC	MIL	MIN	NYY	OAK	TEX
Baltimore	—	10–8	7–5	5–7	12–6	14–4	8–4	8–10	6–6	11–7	6–6	4–8
Boston	8–10	—	4–8	8–4	9–9	11–7	4–8	10–8	6–6	11–7	8–4	5–7
California	5–7	8–4	—	10–8–1	3–9	5–7	8–10	3–9	8–10	3–9	6–12	9–9
Chicago	7–5	4–8	8–10–1	—	8–4	7–5	11–7	8–4	7–11–1	4–8	7–11	9–7–1
Cleveland	6–12	9–9	9–3	4–8	—	9–9	8–4	10–8	6–6	7–11	5–7	4–8
Detroit	4–14	7–11	7–5	5–7	9–9	—	7–5	9–9	3–9	11–7	5–7	5–7
Kansas City	4–8	8–4	10–8	7–11	4–8	5–7	—	11–1	8–10	4–8	8–10	8–10
Milwaukee	10–8	8–10	9–3	4–8	8–10	9–9	1–11	—	6–6	9–9	5–7	7–5
Minnesota	6–6	6–6	10–8	11–7–1	6–6	9–3	10–8	6–6	—	4–8	5–13	9–9
New York	7–11	7–11	9–3	8–4	11–7	7–11	8–4	9–9	8–4	—	7–5	8–4
Oakland	6–6	4–8	12–6	11–7	7–5	7–5	10–8	7–5	13–5	5–7	—	8–10
Texas	8–4	7–5	9–9	7–9–1	8–4	7–5	10–8	5–7	9–9	4–8	10–8	—

=== Notable transactions ===
- April 15, 1974: Rich Hinton was signed as a free agent by the White Sox.
- July 11, 1974: Chuck Brinkman was purchased from the White Sox by the Pittsburgh Pirates.

=== Roster ===
1974 Chicago White Sox
Roster
Pitchers: 41 Cy Acosta; 40 Lloyd Allen; 45 Stan Bahnsen; 47 Francisco Barrios; 51 Terry Forster; 54 Goose Gossage; 47 Wayne Granger; 40 Joe Henderson; 21 Bart Johnson; 36 Jim Kaat; 55 Jack Kucek; 34 Bill Moran; 38 Jim Otten; 46 Stan Perzanowski; 26 Skip Pitlock; 19 Ken Tatum; 28 Wilbur Wood	Catchers: 11 Chuck Brinkman; 16 Brian Downing; 12 Ed Herrmann; 8 Pete Varney; Infielders: 15 Dick Allen; 1 Luis Alvarado; 30 Bucky Dent; 48 Lamar Johnson; 3 Eddie Leon; 14 Bill Melton; 25 Tony Muser; 6 Jorge Orta; 9 Lee Richard; 10 Ron Santo; 1 Bill Stein	Outfielders: 22 Buddy Bradford; 2 Jerry Hairston; 24 Ken Henderson; 18 Pat Kelly; 17 Carlos May; 20 Nyls Nyman; 5 Bill Sharp; Other batters: 20 Hugh Yancy	Manager: 7 Chuck Tanner; Coaches: 37 Joe Lonnett; 31 Jim Mahoney; 35 Alex Monchak; 39 Glen Rosenbaum; 33 Johnny Sain

== Player stats ==
=== Batting ===
Note: G = Games played; AB = At bats; R = Runs scored; H = Hits; 2B = Doubles; 3B = Triples; HR = Home runs; RBI = Runs batted in; BB = Base on balls; SO = Strikeouts; AVG = Batting average; SB = Stolen bases

Player	G	AB	R	H	2B	3B	HR	RBI	BB	SO	AVG	SB
Cy Acosta, PH	2	2	0	0	0	0	0	0	0	2	.000	0
Dick Allen, 1B	128	462	84	139	23	1	32	88	57	89	.301	7
Luis Alvarado, 2B, SS	8	10	1	1	0	0	0	0	0	1	.100	0
Buddy Bradford, RF, LF	39	96	16	32	2	0	5	10	13	11	.333	1
Chuck Brinkman, C	8	14	1	2	0	0	0	0	1	3	.143	0
Bucky Dent, SS	154	496	55	136	15	3	5	45	28	48	.274	3
Brian Downing, C, RF, DH, LF	108	293	41	66	12	1	10	39	51	72	.225	0
Jerry Hairston, LF, DH	45	109	8	25	7	0	0	8	13	18	.229	0
Joe Henderson, PH	1	1	0	0	0	0	0	0	0	0	.000	0
Ken Henderson, CF	162	602	76	176	35	5	20	95	66	112	.292	12
Ed Herrmann, C	107	367	32	95	13	1	10	39	16	49	.259	1
Lamar Johnson, 1B, DH	10	29	1	10	0	0	0	2	0	3	.345	0
Jim Kaat, PH	1	1	0	0	0	0	0	0	0	0	.000	0
Pat Kelly, DH, RF	122	424	60	119	16	3	4	21	46	58	.281	18
Eddie Leon, SS, 2B	31	46	1	5	1	0	0	3	2	12	.109	0
Carlos May, LF, DH	149	551	66	137	19	2	8	58	46	76	.249	8
Bill Melton, 3B, DH	136	495	63	120	17	0	21	63	59	60	.242	3
Tony Muser, 1B, DH	103	206	16	60	5	1	1	18	6	22	.291	1
Nyls Nyman, LF	5	14	5	9	2	1	0	4	0	1	.643	1
Jorge Orta, 2B, DH	139	525	73	166	31	2	10	67	40	88	.316	9
Lee Richard, 3B, SS, DH, 2B	32	67	5	11	1	0	0	1	5	8	.164	0
Ron Santo, DH, 2B, 3B, 1B	117	375	29	83	12	1	5	41	37	72	.221	0
Bill Sharp, RF, LF, CF	100	320	45	81	13	2	4	24	25	37	.253	0
Bill Stein, 3B, DH	13	43	5	12	1	0	0	5	7	8	.279	0
Ken Tatum, PH	1	1	0	0	0	0	0	0	0	0	.000	0
Pete Varney, C	9	28	1	7	0	0	0	2	1	8	.250	0
Hugh Yancy, PH	1	0	0	0	0	0	0	0	0	0	.000	0
Team totals	163	5577	684	1492	225	23	135	633	519	858	.268	64

=== Pitching ===
Note: W = Wins; L = Losses; ERA = Earned run average; G = Games pitched; GS = Games started; SV = Saves; IP = Innings pitched; H = Hits allowed; R = Runs allowed; ER = Earned runs allowed; HR = Home runs allowed; BB = Walks allowed; K = Strikeouts

Player	W	L	ERA	G	GS	SV	IP	H	R	ER	HR	BB	K
Cy Acosta	0	3	3.74	27	0	3	45.2	43	22	19	3	20	19
Lloyd Allen	0	1	10.29	6	2	0	7.0	7	9	8	0	13	3
Stan Bahnsen	12	15	4.70	38	35	0	216.1	230	128	113	17	116	102
Francisco Barrios	0	0	27.00	2	0	0	2.0	7	6	6	0	2	2
Terry Forster	7	8	3.62	59	1	24	134.1	120	57	54	6	51	105
Goose Gossage	4	6	4.13	39	3	1	89.1	92	45	41	4	54	64
Wayne Granger	0	0	8.12	5	0	0	7.2	16	8	7	1	3	4
Joe Henderson	1	0	8.40	5	3	0	15.0	21	15	14	2	11	12
Bart Johnson	10	4	2.74	18	18	0	121.2	105	42	37	6	34	76
Jim Kaat	21	13	2.92	42	39	0	277.1	263	106	90	18	66	142
Jack Kucek	1	4	5.26	9	7	0	37.2	48	25	22	3	21	25
Bill Moran	1	3	4.66	15	5	0	46.1	57	27	24	5	25	17
Jim Otten	0	1	5.51	5	1	0	16.1	22	11	10	0	14	11
Stan Perzanowski	0	0	19.29	2	1	0	2.1	8	7	5	1	2	2
Skip Pitlock	3	3	4.43	40	5	1	105.2	103	58	52	7	59	68
Ken Tatum	0	0	4.79	10	1	0	20.2	23	12	11	3	9	5
Wilbur Wood	20	19	3.60	42	42	0	320.1	305	143	128	27	88	169
Team totals	80	80	3.94	163	163	29	1465.2	1470	721	641	103	588	826

== Farm system ==
Level	Team	League	Manager
AAA	Iowa Oaks	American Association	Joe Sparks
AA	Knoxville Knox Sox	Southern League	Jim Napier
A	Appleton Foxes	Midwest League	Gordon Lund
Rookie	GCL White Sox	Gulf Coast League	Joe Jones

LEAGUE CHAMPIONS: Knoxville
