= Rudy Hernandez =

Rudy Hernandez or Hernández may refer to:

- Rudy Hernández (pitcher) (1931–2022), Major League Baseball pitcher from the Dominican Republic
- Rudy Hernández (shortstop) (born 1951), Major League Baseball shortstop from Mexico
- Rodolfo P. Hernández (1931–2013), American soldier and Medal of Honor recipient
- Rudy Hernández (baseball, born 1968), Venezuelan Major League coach
