= List of Major League Baseball career WAR leaders =

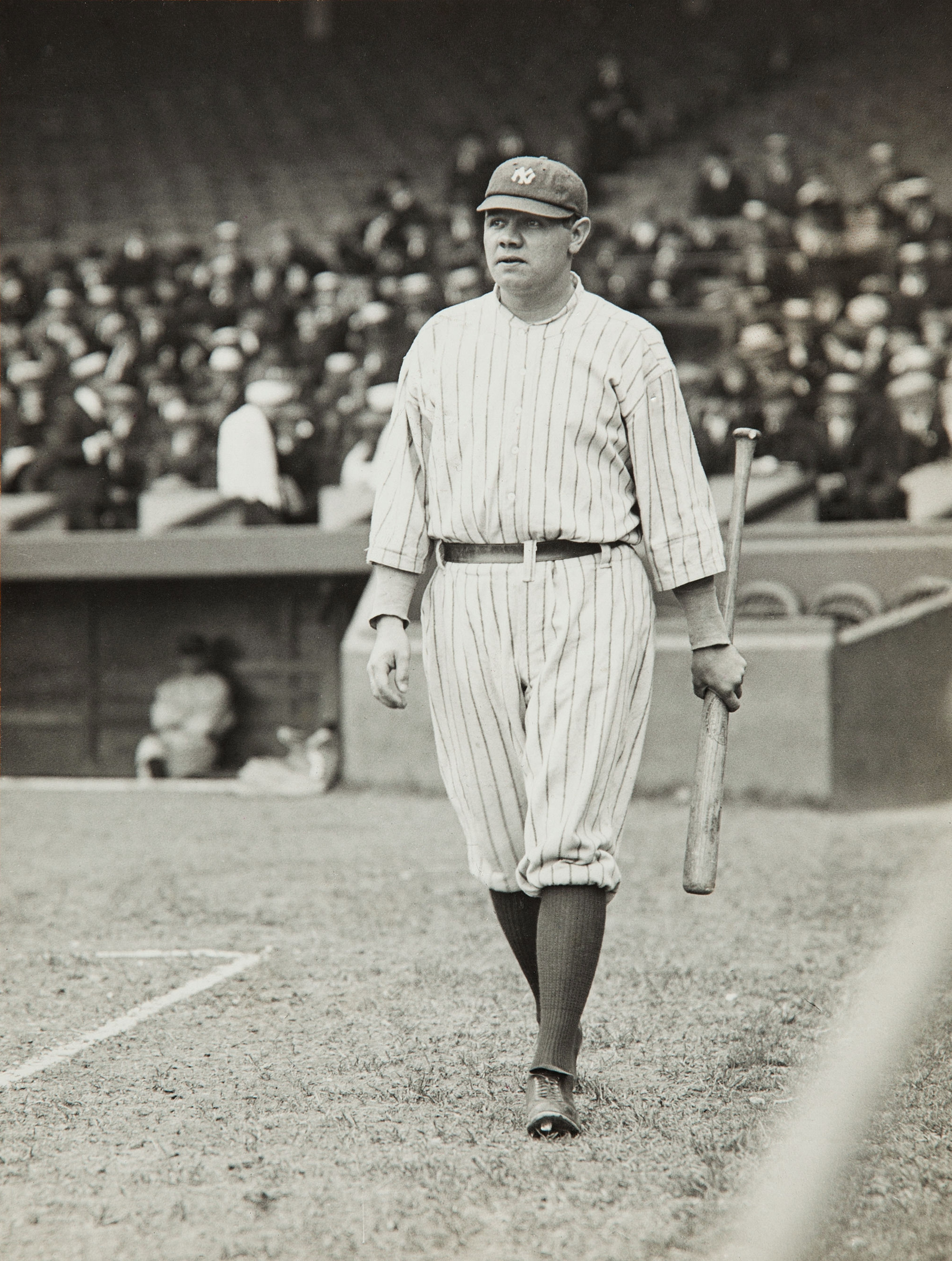
Babe Ruth, the all-time leader in career Wins Above Replacement.

This is a list of Major League Baseball (MLB) players to have accumulated a value of 50 or more career Wins Above Replacement (WAR) using the Baseball Reference calculation. (Note: There are three ways to calculate WAR. WARP is calculated by Baseball Prospectus, fWAR is calculated by FanGraphs, and bWAR is calculated by Baseball Reference.) Through the 2026 Major League Baseball season, 324 players have reached a WAR value of 50.0 or higher, as detailed on this list.

Babe Ruth is the all-time leader in WAR with a value of 182.6. Mike Trout is the active WAR leader with 91.7.

== Key ==
**Rank**	Rank amongst leaders in career Wins Above Replacement. A blank field indicates a tie.
**Player (2026 WAR)**	Name of the player. Amount of WAR accumulated during the 2026 MLB season
**WAR**	Total career Wins Above Replacement.
*	Denotes elected to National Baseball Hall of Fame.
**Bold**	Denotes active player.

== List ==
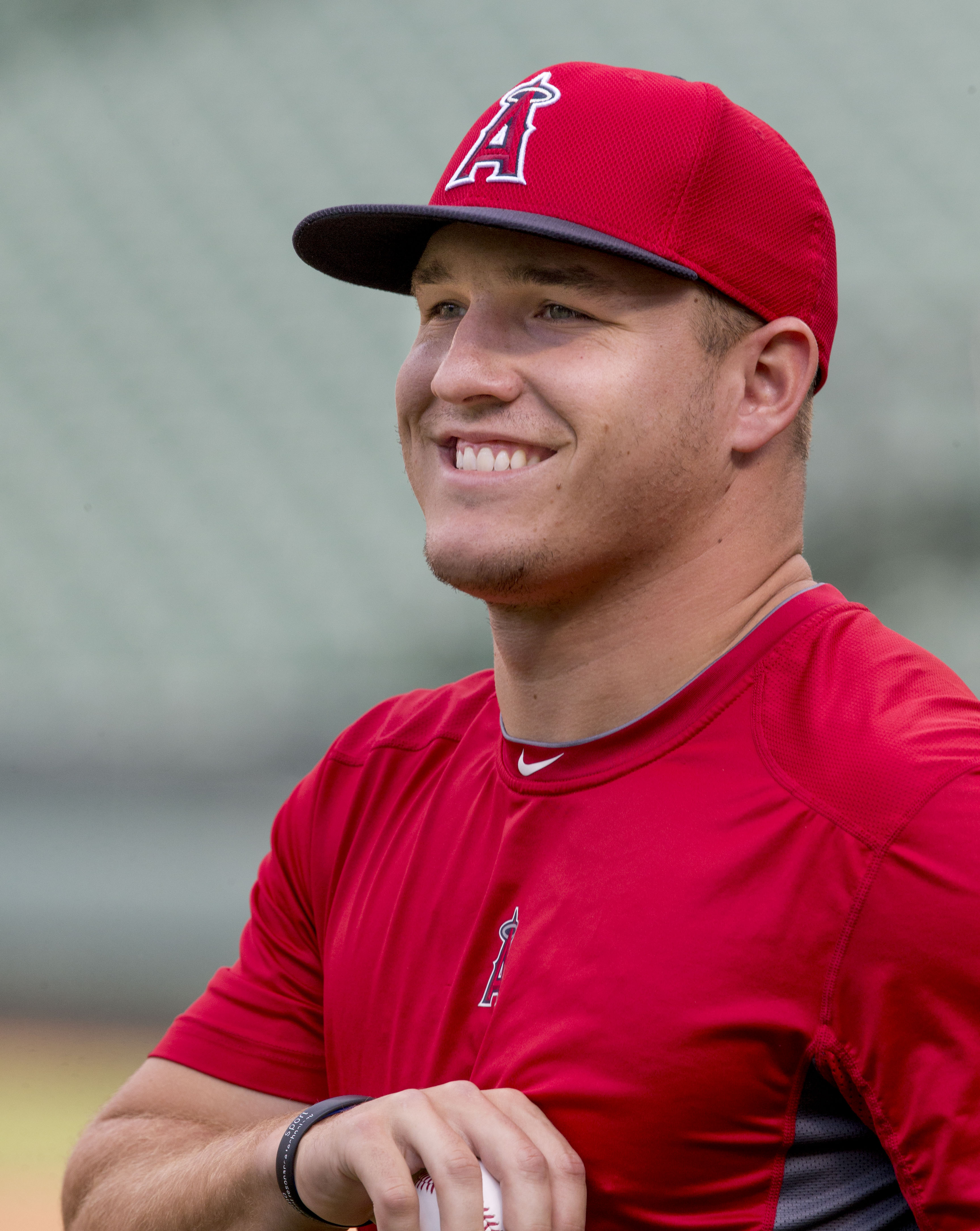
Mike Trout, the active leader and 43rd all-time in career WAR.

Stats updated as of September 27, 2026.

Rank	Player (2026 WAR)	WAR
1	Babe Ruth*	182.6
2	Walter Johnson*	168.4
3	Cy Young*	163.6
4	Barry Bonds	162.8
5	Willie Mays*	156.2
6	Ty Cobb*	149.8
7	Hank Aaron*	143.2
8	Roger Clemens	139.2
9	Tris Speaker*	136.1
10	Honus Wagner*	132.8
11	Stan Musial*	128.5
12	Rogers Hornsby*	127.4
13	Eddie Collins*	123.7
14	Ted Williams*	121.7
15	Grover Cleveland Alexander*	119.9
16	Kid Nichols*	118.2
17	Alex Rodriguez	117.6
18	Lou Gehrig*	113.5
19	Rickey Henderson*	111.2
20	Mel Ott*	110.7
21	Mickey Mantle*	110.3
22	Tom Seaver*	109.9
23	Nap Lajoie*	108.7
24	Christy Mathewson*	107.2
	Frank Robinson*	107.2
26	Mike Schmidt*	106.9
27	Lefty Grove*	106.8
28	Greg Maddux*	106.6
29	Albert Pujols	101.5
30	Randy Johnson*	101.1
31	Joe Morgan*	100.6
32	Warren Spahn*	100.2
33	Carl Yastrzemski*	96.4
34	Eddie Mathews*	96.0
35	Phil Niekro*	95.9
	Cal Ripken Jr.*	95.9
37	Roberto Clemente*	95.0
38	Bert Blyleven*	94.5
39	Cap Anson*	94.3
40	Adrián Beltré*	93.7
41	Al Kaline*	92.8
42	Jimmie Foxx*	92.7
43	**Mike Trout (4.1)**	91.7
44	Eddie Plank*	91.5
45	Wade Boggs*	91.4
46	Steve Carlton*	90.2
47	Gaylord Perry*	90.0
48	Bob Gibson*	89.2
49	George Brett*	88.6
50	Tim Keefe*	86.9
51	Robin Roberts*	86.2
52	Chipper Jones*	85.3
53	Charlie Gehringer*	84.6
54	George Davis*	84.4
55	Roger Connor*	84.2
56	Ferguson Jenkins*	84.1
57	Pedro Martínez*	83.9
58	Ken Griffey Jr.*	83.8
59	John Clarkson*	83.2
60	Mike Mussina*	82.8
61	Justin Verlander	81.9
62	Nolan Ryan*	81.3
63	Rod Carew*	81.2
64	Clayton Kershaw	80.9
65	Tom Glavine*	80.7
66	Jeff Bagwell*	79.9
67	Pete Rose	79.6
68	Curt Schilling	79.5
69	**Mookie Betts (3.9)**	79.0
70	Joe DiMaggio*	78.9
71	Dan Brouthers*	78.7
72	Brooks Robinson*	78.3
73	Arky Vaughan*	77.7
74	Zack Greinke	77.4
	Robin Yount*	77.4
76	Luke Appling*	77.0
77	Ozzie Smith*	76.9
78	Bobby Wallace*	76.4
79	Jim McCormick	76.2
80	Sam Crawford*	75.9

Rank	Player (2026 WAR)	WAR
81	Paul Molitor*	75.7
82	Charles Radbourn*	75.4
83	**Max Scherzer (-0.3)**	75.3
84	Johnny Bench*	75.1
	Lou Whitaker	75.1
86	Bill Dahlen	74.9
87	Paul Waner*	74.6
88	Reggie Jackson*	74.0
89	Frank Thomas*	73.8
90	Pud Galvin*	73.4
91	Jim Thome*	72.9
92	Larry Walker*	72.7
93	Harry Heilmann*	72.4
94	Rafael Palmeiro	71.9
95	Frankie Frisch*	71.7
96	Derek Jeter*	71.3
97	Bobby Grich	71.1
98	Ted Lyons*	70.7
99	Alan Trammell*	70.6
100	Barry Larkin*	70.5
	Ron Santo*	70.5
102	Ed Delahanty*	70.4
	Johnny Mize*	70.4
104	Gary Carter*	70.1
	Scott Rolen*	70.1
106	Carlos Beltrán*	70.0
107	Tim Raines*	69.5
	Rick Reuschel	69.5
109	Manny Ramirez	69.3
110	Tony Gwynn*	69.2
111	Fred Clarke*	69.1
112	John Smoltz*	69.0
113	Robinson Canó	68.7
	Eddie Murray*	68.7
	Iván Rodríguez*	68.7
116	Red Ruffing*	68.6
117	Carlton Fisk *	68.5
	Carl Hubbell*	68.5
	Jim Palmer*	68.5
120	Kenny Lofton	68.4
	Edgar Martínez*	68.4
	Pee Wee Reese*	68.4
123	Al Simmons*	68.2
124	Graig Nettles	68.0
	Ryne Sandberg*	68.0
126	Ernie Banks*	67.8
	Kevin Brown	67.8
128	Miguel Cabrera	67.2
	Dwight Evans	67.2
	Ed Walsh *	67.2
131	Don Drysdale*	67.1
132	Roberto Alomar*	67.0
133	**Freddie Freeman (2.7)**	66.8
134	Don Sutton*	66.7
135	Tony Mullane	66.6
136	Buddy Bell	66.3
137	Luis Tiant	66.1
138	Duke Snider *	66.0
139	Willie Randolph	65.9
140	Goose Goslin*	65.8
141	Craig Biggio*	65.5
142	Amos Rusie*	65.4
143	**Paul Goldschmidt (1.3)**	65.1
144	Andre Dawson*	64.8
145	Joe Cronin*	64.6
	Reggie Smith	64.6
	Chase Utley	64.6
148	Willie McCovey*	64.5
149	Richie Ashburn*	64.3
150	Roy Halladay*	64.2
	**Aaron Judge (1.9)**	64.2
	Dave Winfield*	64.2
153	Jackie Robinson*	64.1
154	Billy Hamilton*	63.9
155	Red Faber*	63.8
156	Billy Williams*	63.7
157	Joey Votto	63.6
158	Bob Feller*	63.4
	Vic Willis*	63.4
160	**Manny Machado (1.5)**	63.3

Rank	Player (2026 WAR)	WAR
161	Clark Griffith*	63.2
162	Lou Boudreau*	63.0
163	Ken Boyer	62.8
	Juan Marichal*	62.8
	Hal Newhouser*	62.8
166	Andruw Jones*	62.7
	**Chris Sale (5.5)**	62.7
167	Home Run Baker*	62.6
169	David Cone	62.3
	CC Sabathia*	62.3
	John Montgomery Ward*	62.3
	Mickey Welch*	62.3
173	Mark McGwire	62.2
174	Dennis Eckersley*	62.1
175	Stan Coveleski*	61.9
176	Todd Helton*	61.8
177	Jack Glasscock	61.6
	Tommy John	61.6
179	Sal Bando	61.5
	Shoeless Joe Jackson	61.5
181	**Nolan Arenado (3.4)**	61.4
	Jake Beckley*	61.4
183	Tommy Bond	60.9
	Early Wynn*	60.9
185	Jesse Burkett*	60.8
	Willie Davis	60.8
187	Charlie Buffinton	60.7
188	Gary Sheffield	60.5
189	Jim Edmonds	60.4
	Keith Hernandez	60.4
	Harmon Killebrew*	60.4
	Dazzy Vance*	60.4
193	**José Ramírez (2.6)**	60.3
194	Bobby Abreu	60.2
	Andy Pettitte	60.2
	Al Spalding*	60.2
	Zack Wheat*	60.2
198	Wes Ferrell	60.1
199	Sherry Magee	60.0
	Ichiro Suzuki*	60.0
201	Mike Piazza*	59.6
202	Yogi Berra*	59.5
	Jim Bunning*	59.5
	Bob Caruthers	59.5
	Vladimir Guerrero*	59.5
206	Joe McGinnity*	59.3
207	Mark Buehrle	59.0
	Cole Hamels	59.0
	Urban Shocker	59.0
210	Evan Longoria	58.9
	Bret Saberhagen	58.9
212	Dick Allen*	58.8
	Eddie Cicotte	58.8
214	Darrell Evans	58.7
215	Sammy Sosa	58.6
216	Mordecai Brown*	58.5
217	Jack Quinn	58.4
218	Rube Waddell*	58.3
219	John Olerud	58.1
220	Bobby Bonds	57.9
	Chuck Finley	57.9
	Tim Hudson	57.9
223	**Shohei Ohtani (6.5)**	57.8
	Bullet Rogan*	57.8
225	George Sisler*	57.7
	Joe Torre*	57.7
227	Willie Stargell*	57.6
228	Billy Herman*	57.4
	Enos Slaughter*	57.4
230	**Francisco Lindor (1.8)**	57.3
231	Whitey Ford*	57.1
	Frank Tanana	57.1
233	**Bryce Harper (3.1)**	56.9
234	Larry Doby*	56.8
235	Will Clark	56.5
	Bill Terry*	56.5
	Dave Stieb	56.4
238	Johnny Damon	56.3
	Mariano Rivera*	56.3
240	Bill Dickey*	56.2

Rank	Player (2026 WAR)	WAR
241	Robin Ventura	56.1
242	Orel Hershiser	56.0
	Jim Whitney	56.0
244	Luis Aparicio*	55.9
	Eppa Rixey*	55.9
	Jimmy Wynn	55.9
247	Jack Powell	55.8
248	Max Carey*	55.7
249	Chet Lemon	55.6
	Joe Mauer*	55.6
	George Uhle	55.6
252	Joe Gordon*	55.5
	Bob Johnson	55.5
254	Hank Greenberg*	55.4
	Jeff Kent*	55.4
	Bobby Mathews	55.4
257	Gabby Hartnett*	55.3
	Willie Keeler*	55.3
259	Stan Hack	55.0
	David Ortiz*	55.0
261	Joe Sewell*	54.9
262	Turkey Stearnes*	54.8
263	Sam Rice*	54.7
264	Willie Wells*	54.6
265	Kevin Appier	54.5
266	José Cruz	54.4
267	Joe Medwick*	54.2
268	Vada Pinson	54.1
269	Tony Pérez*	53.9
270	Ian Kinsler	53.8
271	Ron Cey	53.7
	Jerry Koosman	53.6
	Bucky Walters	53.6
274	Wilbur Cooper	53.5
	David Wells	53.5
276	**Jose Altuve (0.0)**	53.4
	Elmer Flick*	53.4
278	Jimmy Collins*	53.3
	Minnie Miñoso*	53.3
	Billy Pierce	53.3
281	Harry Hooper*	53.2
282	Bert Campaneris	53.1
	Jack Clark	53.1
284	César Cedeño	53.0
	Dwight Gooden	53.0
	Burleigh Grimes*	53.0
287	Bid McPhee*	52.8
288	Joe Tinker*	52.7
289	Fred McGriff*	52.6
288	Babe Adams	52.5
291	Waite Hoyt*	52.4
292	Jim O'Rourke*	52.3
293	Norm Cash	52.1
294	Lance Berkman	52.0
	Larry Jackson	52.0
296	Dustin Pedroia	51.8
297	Luis Gonzalez	51.7
	Johan Santana	51.7
299	Earl Averill*	51.5
	Brian Downing	51.5
301	Toby Harrah	51.4
302	Carl Mays	51.3
303	Bobby Doerr*	51.2
304	Brian Giles	51.1
	Al Orth	51.1
	Kirby Puckett*	51.1
307	Tony Phillips	50.9
308	Bob Elliott	50.8
309	Torii Hunter	50.6
	Joe Kelley*	50.6
311	Jason Giambi	50.5
	Jim Kaat*	50.5
	Kenny Rogers	50.5
	Mark Teixeira	50.5
315	Dave Bancroft*	50.4
	Tommy Bridges	50.4
	Silver King	50.4
	Ted Simmons*	50.4
319	Ted Breitenstein	50.2
	Orlando Cepeda*	50.2
	Fred Lynn	50.2
322	Mark Langston	50.1
323	Roy Oswalt	50.0
	**Marcus Semien (0.5)**	50.0
	Wilbur Wood	50.0

Other active players with 45.0 or more WAR through September 27, 2026.

- Jacob deGrom (49.6) 1.7
- Alex Bregman (48.9) 5.6
- Andrew McCutchen (48.6) -0.4
- Carlos Correa (47.1) 1.3
- Giancarlo Stanton (47.0) 0.2
- Zack Wheeler (46.6) 6.0
- Corey Seager (46.4) 3.2
- Gerrit Cole (45.8) 2.7
- Juan Soto (45.6) 3.0
- Christian Yelich (45.1) 0.1

== See also ==
- Sabermetrics
