= Dick Allen =

American baseball player (1942–2020)

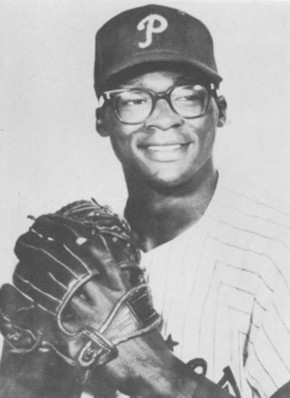
- Allen with the Philadelphia Phillies, c. 1965
- First baseman / Third baseman
- Born: March 8, 1942; Wampum, Pennsylvania, U.S.
- Died: December 7, 2020 (aged 78); Wampum, Pennsylvania, U.S.
- Batted: Right Threw: Right

MLB debut
- September 3, 1963, for the Philadelphia Phillies

Last MLB appearance
- June 19, 1977, for the Oakland Athletics

MLB statistics
- Batting average: .292
- Home runs: 351
- Runs batted in: 1,119
- Stats at Baseball Reference

Teams
- Philadelphia Phillies (1963–1969); St. Louis Cardinals (1970); Los Angeles Dodgers (1971); Chicago White Sox (1972–1974); Philadelphia Phillies (1975–1976); Oakland Athletics (1977)

Career highlights and awards
- 7× All-Star (1965–1967, 1970, 1972–1974); AL MVP (1972); NL Rookie of the Year (1964); 2× AL home run leader (1972, 1974); AL RBI leader (1972); Philadelphia Phillies No. 15 retired; Philadelphia Phillies Wall of Fame

Member of the National

Baseball Hall of Fame
- Induction: 2025
- Vote: 81.3%
- Election method: Classic Baseball Era Committee

Richard Anthony Allen (March 8, 1942 – December 7, 2020), nicknamed "Crash" and "the Wampum Walloper", was an American professional baseball player. During his 15-year Major League Baseball (MLB) career, he played as a first baseman and third baseman, most notably for the Philadelphia Phillies and Chicago White Sox, and was one of baseball's top sluggers of the 1960s and early 1970s.

A seven-time All-Star player, Allen began his career as a Phillie by being selected 1964 National League (NL) Rookie of the Year and in 1972 was the American League (AL) Most Valuable Player with the Chicago White Sox. He led the AL in home runs twice; the NL in slugging percentage once and the AL twice; and each major league in on-base percentage once apiece. Allen's career .534 slugging percentage was among his era's highest in an age of comparatively modest offensive production. The Phillies retired Allen's uniform number 15 on September 3, 2020, a few months before his death. On July 27, 2025, Allen was inducted into the Baseball Hall of Fame.

== Early life ==
Allen was born in Wampum, Pennsylvania, one of nine children of Era and Coy Allen, a truck driver. After his parents divorced, he was mainly raised by his mother who worked as a housekeeper to support her children. Allen grew up in Chewton, Pennsylvania, a small village just outside Wampum.

He attended Wampum High School where, along with his brothers Hank and Ron, he was a star basketball player at the school; all three brothers earned All-State honors. In the 1958 and 1960 seasons, Allen captained the basketball team, leading them to the state championship and earning All-American honors.

Despite their prowess in basketball, the brothers chose to prioritize baseball as, at the time, baseball paid better and they wanted to buy their mother a new house. Hank became an outfielder for three teams in the American League while Ron briefly played first base for the 1972 St. Louis Cardinals. Dick was scouted by Phillies scout Jack Ogden who convinced the team to sign Allen in 1960 for a $70,000 bonus.

== MLB career ==
=== Philadelphia Phillies ===
Allen faced racial harassment while playing for the Phillies' minor league affiliate in Little Rock; residents sent death threats to Allen, the local team's first black player.

His first full season in the majors, 1964, ranks among the greatest rookie seasons ever. He led the league in runs (125), triples (13), extra base hits (80), and total bases (352); Allen finished in the top five in batting average (.318), slugging average (.557), hits (201), and doubles (38) and won Rookie of the Year. Playing for the first time at third base, he led the league with 41 errors. Along with outfielder Johnny Callison and pitchers Chris Short and Jim Bunning, Allen led the Phillies to a six-and-a-half game hold on first place with 12 games to play in an exceptionally strong National League. The 1964 Phillies then lost ten straight games and finished tied for second place. The Phillies lost the first game of the streak to the Cincinnati Reds when Chico Ruiz stole home with Frank Robinson batting for the game's only run. In Allen's autobiography (written with Tim Whitaker), Crash: The Life and Times of Dick Allen, Allen stated that the play "broke our humps". Despite the Phillies' collapse, Allen hit .438 with 5 doubles, 2 triples, 3 home runs and 11 RBI in those last 12 games.

Allen hit a two-run home run off the Cubs' Larry Jackson on May 29, 1965 that cleared the Coke sign on Connie Mack Stadium's left-center field roof. That home run, an estimated 529-footer, inspired Willie Stargell to say: "Now I know why they (the Phillies fans) boo Richie all the time. When he hits a home run, there's no souvenir."

Dick Allen's number 15 was retired by the Philadelphia Phillies in 2020.

While playing for Philadelphia, Allen appeared on several All-Star teams including the 1965–67 teams (in the latter of these three games, he hit a home run off Dean Chance). He led the league in slugging (.632), OPS (1.027) and extra base hits (75) in 1966.

Non-baseball incidents soon marred Allen's Philadelphia career. In July 1965, he got into a fistfight with teammate Frank Thomas. According to two teammates who witnessed the fight, Thomas swung a bat at Allen, hitting him in the shoulder. Johnny Callison said, "Thomas got himself fired when he swung that bat at Richie. In baseball you don't swing a bat at another player—ever." Pat Corrales confirmed that Thomas hit Allen with a bat and added that Thomas was a "bully" known for making racially divisive remarks. Allen and his teammates were not permitted to give their side of the story under threat of a heavy fine. The Phillies released Thomas the next day. That not only made the fans and local sports writers see Allen as costing a white player his job, but freed Thomas to give his version of the fight. In an hour-long interview aired December 15, 2009, on the MLB Network's Studio 42 with Bob Costas, Allen asserted that he and Thomas had since become good friends.

Allen's name was a source of controversy: he had been known since his youth as "Dick" to family and friends, but the media referred to him upon his arrival in Philadelphia as "Richie". After leaving the Phillies, he asked to be called "Dick", saying Richie was a little boy's name. In his dual career as an R&B singer, the label on his records with the Groovy Grooves firm slated him as "Rich" Allen.

Some Phillies fans, known for being tough on hometown players even in the best of times, exacerbated Allen's problems. Initially the abuse was verbal, with obscenities and racial epithets. Eventually Allen was greeted with showers of fruit, ice, refuse, and even flashlight batteries as he took the field. He began wearing his batting helmet even while playing his position in the field, which gave rise to another nickname, "Crash Helmet", shortened to "Crash".

He almost ended his career in 1967 after mangling his throwing hand by pushing it through a car headlight. Allen was fined $2,500 and suspended indefinitely in 1969 when he failed to appear for the Phillies twi-night doubleheader game with the New York Mets. Allen had gone to New Jersey in the morning to see a horse race, and got caught in traffic trying to return.

=== St. Louis Cardinals and Los Angeles Dodgers ===
Allen finally had enough, and demanded the Phillies trade him. They sent him to the Cardinals in a trade before the 1970 season. Even this deal caused controversy, though not of Allen's making, since Cardinals outfielder Curt Flood refused to report to the Phillies as part of the trade. (Flood then sued baseball in an unsuccessful attempt to overthrow the reserve clause and to be declared a free agent.) Coincidentally, the player the Phillies received as compensation for Flood not reporting, Willie Montañez, hit 30 home runs as a 1971 rookie to eclipse Allen's Phillies rookie home run record of 29, set in 1964. Allen earned another All-Star berth in St. Louis.

Decades before Mark McGwire, Dick Allen entertained the St. Louis fans with some long home runs, at least one of them landing in the seats above the club level in left field. Nevertheless, the Cardinals traded Allen to the Los Angeles Dodgers before the 1971 season for 1969 NL Rookie of the Year Ted Sizemore and young catcher Bob Stinson. Allen had a relatively quiet season in 1971 although he hit .295 for the Dodgers.

=== Chicago White Sox ===
Allen was acquired by the White Sox from the Dodgers for Tommy John and Steve Huntz at the Winter Meetings on December 2, 1971. White Sox manager Chuck Tanner's low-key style of handling ballplayers made it possible for Allen to thrive, for a while, on the South Side. Tanner decided to play Allen exclusively at first base, which allowed him to concentrate on hitting. That first year, his first in the American League (AL), Allen almost single-handedly lifted the entire team to second place in the AL West, as he led the league in home runs (37) (setting a team record), RBI (113), walks (99), on-base percentage (.420), slugging percentage (.603), and on-base plus slugging percentage (1.023), while winning a well-deserved MVP award. However, the Sox fell short at the end and finished 5 1/2 games behind the World Series–bound Oakland Athletics.

On February 27, 1973, Allen became the highest-paid player in baseball, signing a 3-year $750,000 contract. His $250,000 AAV was a record at the time of the contract's signing. The Sox were favored by many to make the playoffs in 1973, but those hopes were dashed due in large measure to the fractured fibula that Allen suffered in June. (He tried to return five weeks after injuring the leg in a collision with Mike Epstein of the California Angels, but the pain ended Allen's season after just one game in which he batted 3-for-5.) In 1974, despite his making the AL All-Star team in each of the three years with the Sox, Allen's stay in Chicago ended in controversy when he left the team on September 14 with two weeks left in the season. In his autobiography, Allen blamed his feud with then third-baseman/Designated hitter Ron Santo, who was playing a final, undistinguished season with the White Sox after leaving the crosstown Chicago Cubs.

With Allen's intention to continue playing baseball uncertain, the White Sox reluctantly sold his contract to the Atlanta Braves for only $5,000, despite the fact that he had led the league in home runs, slugging (.563), and OPS (.938). Allen refused to report to the Braves and announced his retirement.

=== Return to the Phillies ===
The Phillies coaxed Allen out of retirement for the 1975 season. The lay-off and effects of his broken leg in 1973 hampered his play. His numbers improved in 1976, a Phillies division winner, as he hit 15 home runs and batted .268 in 85 games. He continued his tape measure legacy during his second go-round with the Phillies. On August 22, 1975, Allen smashed a homer into the upper deck at San Diego Stadium, as the Phillies beat the Padres 6-5.

=== Oakland Athletics ===
Allen played in 54 games and hit five home runs with 31 RBI with a .240 batting average during his final season, for the Oakland Athletics in 1977 before leaving the team abruptly in June of that season. His final day as a player was on June 19, playing both games of a doubleheader, against the White Sox. In five total plate appearances, he had two hits, with his final hit being a single in the eighth inning.

== Career statistics and honors ==
During a pitching-dominant era, Allen was considered one of the top sluggers of the 1960s and 1970s era. He finished his career with 351 home runs and a .534 slugging percentage.

Allen's number 15 was retired by the Phillies in September 2020. He was inducted into the Baseball Reliquary's Shrine of the Eternals in 2004.

Category	Games	AB	Runs	Hits	2B	3B	HR	RBI	SB	CS	BB	SO	AVG	OBP	SLG	OPS	E	FLD%	Ref.
Total	1,749	6,332	1,099	1,848	320	79	351	1,119	133	52	894	1,556	.292	.378	.534	.912	245	.975	

== Hall of Fame candidacy ==
Sabermetrician Bill James rated Dick Allen as the second-most controversial player in baseball history, behind Rogers Hornsby. Allen had the highest slugging percentage among players eligible for but not in the National Baseball Hall of Fame until Albert Belle became eligible in 2006.

Allen Barra wrote that a "growing body of baseball historians think that Dick Allen is the best player eligible for the Hall of Fame". The arguments usually centered around his very high career averages, batting (.292), slugging (.534), and on-base (.378). They also state that he began his career during the mid-1960s, a period so dominated by pitchers that it is sometimes called the "second dead ball era". Of the major league batters with 500 or more career home runs whose play intersected Dick Allen's career at the beginning or end, only Mickey Mantle's lifetime OPS+ of 172 topped Dick Allen's lifetime 156 OPS+. Allen also played some of his career in pitcher-friendly parks such as Busch Memorial Stadium, Dodger Stadium, and Comiskey Park.

In addition to hitting for high offensive percentages, Allen displayed prodigious power. Before scientific weight training, muscle-building dietary supplements, and anabolic steroids, Allen boasted a muscular physique along the lines of Mickey Mantle and Jimmie Foxx. Baseball historian Bill Jenkinson ranks Allen with Foxx and Mantle, and just a notch below Babe Ruth, as the four top long-distance sluggers ever to wield a baseball bat. A segment of MLB Network's Prime 9 concurred with Jenkinson's findings. On that same broadcast, Willie Mays stated that Allen hit a ball harder than any player he had ever seen. Dick Allen, like Babe Ruth, hit with a rather heavy bat. Allen's 40-ounce bat bucked the Ted Williams-inspired trend of using a light bat for increased bat speed. Allen combined massive strength and body torque to produce bat speed and drive the ball. Two of his drives cleared Connie Mack Stadium's 65-foot-high (20 m) left-field grandstand. Allen also cleared that park's 65-foot-high right-center field scoreboard twice, a feat considered virtually impossible for a right-handed hitter.

Detractors of Allen's Hall of Fame credentials argue that his career was not as long as most Hall of Famers, and therefore lacked the career cumulative numbers that others do. They further argue that the controversies surrounding him negatively impacted his teams.

Hall of Fame player Willie Stargell countered with a historical perspective of Dick Allen's time: "Dick Allen played the game in the most conservative era in baseball history. It was a time of change and protest in the country, and baseball reacted against all that. They saw it as a threat to the game. The sportswriters were reactionary too. They didn't like seeing a man of such extraordinary skills doing it his way. It made them nervous. Dick Allen was ahead of his time. His views and way of doing things would go unnoticed today. If I had been manager of the Phillies back when he was playing, I would have found a way to make Dick Allen comfortable. I would have told him to blow off the writers. It was my observation that when Dick Allen was comfortable, balls left the park."

The two managers for whom Allen played the longest—Gene Mauch of the Phillies and Chuck Tanner of the White Sox—agreed with Willie Stargell that Allen was not a "clubhouse lawyer" who harmed team chemistry. Asked if Allen's behavior ever had a negative influence on the team, Mauch said, "Never. Dick's teammates always liked him. I'd take him in a minute." According to Tanner, "Dick was the leader of our team, the captain, the manager on the field. He took care of the young kids, took them under his wing. And he played every game as if it was his last day on earth."

Hall of Fame player Orlando Cepeda agreed, saying to author Tim Whitaker, "Dick Allen played with fire in his eyes."

Hall of Fame teammate Goose Gossage also confirmed Tanner's view. In an interview with USA TODAY Sports, Gossage said: "I've been around the game a long time, and he's the greatest player I've ever seen play in my life. He had the most amazing season (1972) I've ever seen. He's the smartest baseball man I've ever been around in my life. He taught me how to pitch from a hitter's perspective, and taught me how to play the game right. There's no telling the numbers this guy could have put up if all he worried about was stats. The guy belongs in the Hall of Fame."

Another of Allen's ex-White Sox teammates, pitcher Stan Bahnsen, said, "I actually thought that Dick was better than his stats. Every time we needed a clutch hit, he got it. He got along great with his teammates and he was very knowledgeable about the game. He was the ultimate team guy."

Another Hall of Fame teammate, Mike Schmidt, credited Dick Allen in his 2006 book, Clearing the Bases, as his mentor. In Schmidt's biography, written by historian William C. Kashatus, Schmidt fondly recalls Allen mentoring him before a game in Chicago in 1976, saying to him, "Mike, you've got to relax. You've got to have some fun. Remember when you were just a kid and you'd skip supper to play ball? You were having fun. Hey, with all the talent you've got, baseball ought to be fun. Enjoy it. Be a kid again." Schmidt responded by hitting four home runs in the game. Schmidt is quoted in the same book, "The baseball writers used to claim that Dick would divide the clubhouse along racial lines. That was a lie. The truth is that Dick never divided any clubhouse."

=== BBWAA consideration ===
Allen was included in 1983 Baseball Hall of Fame balloting for consideration by the Baseball Writers' Association of America (BBWAA). He received 14 votes out of the 374 ballots cast (3.7%). He was not on the 1984 ballot, but returned in 1985 and remained on the ballot until 1997. He never received more than 18.9% of the vote (75% is required for election).

=== Committee consideration ===
In 2010, the Baseball Hall of Fame established a Golden Era Committee (one of several new committees replacing the prior Veterans Committee), to vote on the possible Hall of Fame induction of previously overlooked candidates who played between 1947 and 1972. Beginning in December 2011, this 16-member committee voted every three years on 10 nominated candidates from the era, selected by the BBWAA's Historical Overview Committee. Allen was first considered in December 2014 (for the class of 2015). Allen and former outfielder Tony Oliva both fell one vote short of the 12 required votes, as no one was elected by the committee.

In 2016, the Golden Era Committee was replaced by the Golden Days Committee (1950–1969) to vote on 10 candidates beginning in December 2020 (for the class of 2021). In August 2020, the Hall of Fame rescheduled the committee's first winter meeting voting to December 2021 (for the class of 2022), due to the COVID-19 pandemic. On December 5, 2021, results of Golden Days Committee voting was released; Allen again fell one vote short of election, garnering 11 votes from the 16-member committee.

He appeared on the Classic Baseball Era Committee's 2025 ballot on December 8, 2024, and was elected with 13 out of 16 votes. He was formally inducted on July 27, 2025.

== Music career ==
Dick Allen sang professionally in a high, delicate tenor. The tone and texture of his voice has drawn comparisons to Harptones' lead singer Willie Winfield. During Allen's time with the Sixties-era Phillies, he sang lead with a doo-wop group called The Ebonistics. "Rich Allen and The Ebonistics" sang professionally at Philadelphia night clubs. He once entertained during halftime of a Philadelphia 76ers basketball game. The Philadelphia Inquirer printed a review of his performance:

Here came Rich Allen. Flowered shirt. Tie six-inches (152 mm) wide. Hiphugger bell-bottomed pants. A microphone in his hands. Rich Allen, the most booed man in Philadelphia from April to October, when Eagles coach Joe Kuharich takes over, walked out in front of 9,557 people at the Spectrum last night to sing with his group, The Ebonistics, and a most predictable thing happened. He was booed. Two songs later though, a most unpredictable thing happened. They cheered Rich Allen. They cheered him as warmly as they have ever cheered him for a game-winning home run."

Although his music career was not as substantial or long-lasting as that of Milwaukee Braves outfielder Lee Maye, Allen gained lasting praise for recording a 45 single on the Groovey Grooves label (160-A, "Rich Allen and the Ebonistics") titled "Echo's of November" (misspelled Echoes) which was released in 1968. The song name is featured in the Phillies' official hundred-year anniversary video and the novel '64 Intruder. In 2010, Brazilian pop star Ana Volans re-recorded Echoes of November; her rendition sold briskly in Brazil, and the CD's jacket contains a dedication to Dick Allen and his Hall of Fame candidacy).

== Personal life ==
Allen first married his classmate Barbara Moore with whom he had three children: sons Richard Jr. and Eron, and daughter Terri; their marriage ended in divorce. Terri Allen was murdered outside her apartment in Largo, Maryland, by her boyfriend in a murder-suicide in 1991.

His marriage to his second wife, Willa (née King), lasted 33 years. The couple lived in Wampum, Pennsylvania. He died at his home in Wampum on December 7, 2020, at age 78.

== See also ==
- List of Chicago White Sox award winners and league leaders
- List of Major League Baseball annual fielding errors leaders
- List of Major League Baseball annual home run leaders
- List of Major League Baseball annual runs batted in leaders
- List of Major League Baseball annual runs scored leaders
- List of Major League Baseball annual triples leaders
- List of Major League Baseball career home run leaders
- List of Major League Baseball career intentional bases on balls leaders
- List of Major League Baseball career OPS leaders
- List of Major League Baseball career runs batted in leaders
- List of Major League Baseball career runs scored leaders
- List of Major League Baseball career slugging percentage leaders
- List of Major League Baseball career strikeouts by batters leaders
- List of Major League Baseball career WAR leaders
- List of Philadelphia Phillies award winners and league leaders
- St. Louis Cardinals award winners and league leaders
