= Rudy Hernández (shortstop) =

Mexican baseball player (born 1951)

- Shortstop / Third baseman
- Born: October 18, 1951 (age 74); Empalme, Sonora, Mexico
- Batted: Right Threw: Right

MLB debut
- September 6, 1972, for the Chicago White Sox

Last MLB appearance
- October 4, 1972, for the Chicago White Sox

MLB statistics
- Batting average: .190
- Home runs: 0
- Runs batted in: 1
- Stats at Baseball Reference

Teams
- Chicago White Sox (1972)

Career highlights and awards
- Mexican League Rookie of the Year Award (1972)

Rodolfo "Rudy" Hernández Acosta (born October 18, 1951) is a Mexican former shortstop in Major League Baseball and Minor League Baseball manager. Listed at 5' 9", 150 lb., Hernández batted and threw right handed. He was born in Empalme, Sonora.

== Career ==
Hernández appeared in eight games for the Chicago White Sox in its 1972 season. He was acquired by the Sox from the Charros de Jalisco of the Mexican League in July 1972. He made his majors debut on September 6 of that same year. At the age of 20, he was the fifth-youngest player to appear in an American League game that season.

During his short stint with the White Sox, he hit just .190 (4-for-21) but was excellent in the field. His four hits were against Clyde Wright, Rich Hand, Dick Bosman, and Bert Blyleven. Besides, he recorded 10 putouts and 16 assists without errors, and participated in three double plays.

Hernández was traded back to Jalisco for pitcher Francisco Barrios on December 4, 1973.

In between, Hernández had a successful career in Mexico, where he played professional baseball for 19 years, between the Mexican League and the Mexican Pacific League.

He posted a .264 batting average with 148 home runs and 958 RBI in the Mexican League. His statistics for the Mexican Pacific League have yet been registered.

Hernández also took part of a few championships, like the 1987 with Venados de Mazatlan, and the memorable 1984 with Leones de Yucatan.
