= Bill Moran (pitcher) =

American baseball player (born 1950)

- Pitcher
- Born: September 26, 1950 (age 75); Portsmouth, Virginia, U.S.
- Batted: Right Threw: Right

MLB debut
- April 12, 1974, for the Chicago White Sox

Last MLB appearance
- August 3, 1974, for the Chicago White Sox

MLB statistics
- Win–loss record: 1–3
- Earned run average: 4.66
- Innings pitched: 46 1/3
- Stats at Baseball Reference

Teams
- Chicago White Sox (1974)

Carl William Moran (born September 26, 1950) is an American politician and former professional baseball pitcher. The right-hander stood 6 feet 4 inches (1.93 m) tall and weighed 210 pounds (95 kg) during his baseball career.

Born in Portsmouth, Virginia, he attended Woodrow Wilson High School, Louisburg College, and Jacksonville University. Drafted by the Boston Red Sox in the ninth round of the 1971 Major League Baseball draft, Moran played one year in the Major Leagues, going 1–3 with a 4.66 ERA for the Chicago White Sox during the 1974 season. He appeared in 15 MLB games pitched, five as a starter, and allowed 57 hits and 23 bases on balls in 46 1/3 innings pitched. He defeated the Oakland Athletics (headed for their third consecutive World Series championship that season) 3–2 on May 18 at Comiskey Park for his only MLB victory, starting the contest and allowing two earned runs in five innings. Terry Forster earned the save with four innings of shutout relief. Moran's minor league pitching career lasted for nine seasons (1971–1979), and he later worked as a scout for the White Sox.

In 2010, he ran for mayor of Portsmouth in a special election to replace recalled mayor James W. Holley III.
