= Chuck Tanner =

American baseball player and manager (1928–2011)

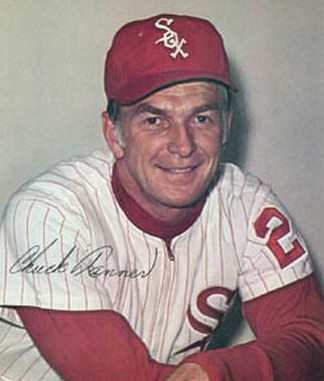
- Tanner with the Chicago White Sox in 1971
- Outfielder / Manager
- Born: July 4, 1928; New Castle, Pennsylvania, U.S.
- Died: February 11, 2011 (aged 82); New Castle, Pennsylvania, U.S.
- Batted: Left Threw: Left

MLB debut
- April 12, 1955, for the Milwaukee Braves

Last MLB appearance
- May 8, 1962, for the Los Angeles Angels

MLB statistics
- Batting average: .261
- Home runs: 21
- Runs batted in: 105
- Managerial record: 1,352–1,381
- Stats at Baseball Reference
- Managerial record at Baseball Reference

Teams
- As player: Milwaukee Braves (1955–1957); Chicago Cubs (1957–1958); Cleveland Indians (1959–1960); Los Angeles Angels (1961–1962); As manager: Chicago White Sox (1970–1975); Oakland Athletics (1976); Pittsburgh Pirates (1977–1985); Atlanta Braves (1986–1988)

Career highlights and awards
- World Series champion (1979)

Charles William Tanner (July 4, 1928 – February 11, 2011) was an American professional baseball player and manager. A left fielder and pinch hitter who appeared in 396 games in Major League Baseball (MLB) between 1955 and 1962, he was known for his unwavering confidence and infectious optimism. As a manager for all or parts of 19 seasons, he led the Pittsburgh Pirates to a World Series championship in 1979. In his last baseball job, he served as a senior advisor to Pirates general manager Neal Huntington.

== Playing career ==
A left-handed batter and thrower, Tanner signed his first professional baseball contract with the Boston Braves. He played for eight seasons (1955–1962) for four teams: the Milwaukee Braves, Chicago Cubs, Cleveland Indians and Los Angeles Angels. In 396 games played, Tanner batted .261 with 21 home runs. While with the Braves, Tanner hit a home run off the first pitch in his first career at-bat on April 12, 1955. He is the only Braves player to hit a home run in his first at-bat in Milwaukee.

== Managerial career ==
Tanner is best known as a manager, having managed four teams from 1970 to 1988. His overall managerial record was 1,352–1,381 in 17 full seasons and parts of two others.

=== Minor leagues ===
Tanner spent his entire Minor League managing career in the Angels' system. In 1963, Tanner began his managerial career with the single-A Quad Cities Angels in the Midwest League, and spent the next seven seasons climbing the Angels' organizational ladder, including managing the El Paso Sun Kings (1965-1966 and 1968), and Seattle Angels (1967). He won the Texas League title with El Paso in 1968. In 1970 he led the AAA Hawaii Islanders to 98 wins in 146 games and a berth in the Pacific Coast League (PCL) championship series.

=== Chicago White Sox ===
Both Tanner and Roland Hemond joined the Chicago White Sox from the Angels on September 4, 1970, when general manager Stu Holcomb hired them as manager and director of player personnel respectively. Tanner, who signed a two-year contract, replaced Don Gutteridge who had been dismissed two days prior. Due to the Islanders qualifying for the PCL championship series, he was unable to make his White Sox managerial debut until September 15, requiring Bill Adair to serve in the interim. Tanner did not retain Adair for his staff after the season, but he named Al Monchak and Joe Lonnett as his first- and third-base coaches respectively on October 2, 1970. All three went on to serve in similar capacities together with the White Sox (1971–75), Oakland Athletics (1976) and Pittsburgh Pirates (1977–85), with Monchak continuing as Tanner's first-base coach with the Atlanta Braves from 1986 to 1988.

With the White Sox, Tanner managed such star players as Wilbur Wood, Carlos May, Bill Melton, and the temperamental Dick Allen, who like Tanner was a native of Lawrence County, Pennsylvania by way of Wampum. His most successful season with the Sox came in 1972, when he managed them to a close second-place finish behind the eventual World Series champion Oakland Athletics in the American League (AL) Western Division. The pitching staff was led by 24-game winner Wood, whom Tanner had converted from a reliever to a starter. According to Tommy John, "Tanner never liked to use a knuckleballer in relief, because of the way the knuckler danced and moved all over. He solved that by making Wood a starter." Tanner was voted that year's The Sporting News Manager of the Year Award. He also converted Rich "Goose" Gossage from a starting pitcher to a reliever, a role that led Gossage to the Hall of Fame. He finished his White Sox career with a record of 401 wins and 414 losses. Tanner was replaced by Paul Richards on December 17, 1975. Bill Veeck, who had repurchased the White Sox, invited Tanner to remain in the organization in a different capacity, but the offer was declined. Tanner still had to be paid $60,000 in each of three remaining years of his White Sox contract.

John said that "Chuck Tanner once told me he never forgot the fact that he was a player. When he became a manager, he remembered how he wanted his manager to treat him."

=== Oakland Athletics ===
One day later on December 18, 1975, Tanner was hired to succeed Alvin Dark as manager of the Oakland Athletics. With speedy players such as Bert Campaneris, Bill North, Claudell Washington, and Don Baylor, Tanner made the A's into a running team, stealing an AL league-record 341 bases. Eight players had 20 or more steals, including 51 by pinch runners Matt Alexander (who only came to the plate 30 times) and Larry Lintz (who had one at-bat all season). However, the days of the juggernaut A's of Reggie Jackson and Catfish Hunter had passed with the coming of free agency and Tanner's switch to small-ball couldn't prop up a crumbling dynasty as the team finished second in the AL West, 2 1/2 games behind the Kansas City Royals with an 87-74 record.

A's owner Charlie Finley had hoped to secure a manager at a cut rate for at least three years, but ended up in a dispute with Veeck and the American League over how much each team owed Tanner. AL president Lee MacPhail ruled that the White Sox had to pay most of the $60,000 owed to Tanner for the 1976 season but was released from any contractual obligation for 1977 and 1978.

=== Pittsburgh Pirates ===
1982 photocard of Tanner for Pittsburgh Pirates

Tanner returned to his Western Pennsylvania roots when he was traded by the A's to the Pittsburgh Pirates for Manny Sanguillén and $100,000 on November 5, 1976. He succeeded the recently retired Danny Murtaugh as Pirates manager. This was the third instance in major-league history where a manager has been part of a baseball trade. (Joe Gordon and Jimmie Dykes were traded for each other during the 1960 season, and Gil Hodges was traded by the Washington Senators to the New York Mets for pitcher Bill Denehy and $100,000 in November 1967.) Sanguillén was traded back to the Pirates in 1978.

He reached the pinnacle of his managerial career in 1979 as the skipper of the Pirates' 1979 World Series champion team. The team included future Hall of Famers, first baseman Willie Stargell and pitcher Bert Blyleven, along with curmudgeonly stars like third baseman Bill Madlock and outfielder Dave Parker. Tanner guided the team together, and the players selected the Sister Sledge hit "We Are Family" as their theme song. The Pirates were able to win the World Series after falling behind three games to one to the Baltimore Orioles. Hall of Fame manager Sparky Anderson wrote of the Pirates, "They do everything with abandon, because that's the way Chuck Tanner wants it. He's an aggressive manager, a manager who doesn't go by the book. That's why Pittsburgh is such an exciting team." It would be the only time Tanner led a team to the postseason.

Although it was not apparent at the time, Tanner's managerial career had crested. The next six seasons could not match his 1979 World Series winner, and the Pittsburgh drug trials showed that serious drug problems beset the team—arguably more so than anyone else in the majors. The most famous Pirate affected by his usage was Parker, whose cocaine habit punched a hole in his offensive production in the middle of his career. Reliever Rod Scurry had it much worse; his cocaine habit ultimately forced him out of baseball in 1988 and cost him his life in 1992. Following four mediocre seasons in which the Pirates neither lost nor won no more than 84 games, but only finished as high as second place in the division once, they fell to last place two years in a row, bottoming out at 104 losses in 1985, and Tanner was fired. He finished his Pirates career with a record of 711 wins and 685 losses.

=== Atlanta Braves ===
Tanner was hired by the Atlanta Braves prior to the 1986 season. This was easily his least successful managerial stop. Tanner's Braves finished last and second to last in the NL West in his two full seasons. Following a 12–27 start to the 1988 season, Tanner was fired by the Braves and replaced by Russ Nixon. He finished his Braves career with a record of 153 wins and 208 losses.

=== Managerial record ===
Team	Year	Regular season					Postseason			
Team	Year	Games	Won	Lost	Win %	Finish	Won	Lost	Win %	Result
CWS	1970	16	3	13	.188	6th in AL West	–	–	–	–
CWS	1971	162	79	83	.488	3rd in AL West	–	–	–	–
CWS	1972	154	87	67	.565	2nd in AL West	–	–	–	–
CWS	1973	162	77	85	.475	5th in AL West	–	–	–	–
CWS	1974	160	80	80	.500	4th in AL West	–	–	–	–
CWS	1975	161	75	86	.466	5th in AL West	–	–	–	–
CWS total		815	401	414	.492		0	0	–	
OAK	1976	161	87	74	.540	2nd in AL West	–	–	–	–
OAK total		161	87	74	.540		0	0	–	
PIT	1977	162	96	66	.593	2nd in NL East	–	–	–	–
PIT	1978	161	88	73	.547	2nd in NL East	–	–	–	–
PIT	1979	162	98	64	.605	1st in NL East	7	3	.700	Won World Series (BAL)
PIT	1980	162	83	79	.512	3rd in NL East	–	–	–	–
PIT	1981	48	25	23	.521	4th in NL East	–	–	–	–
PIT	1981	54	21	33	.389	6th in NL East	–	–	–	–
PIT	1982	162	84	78	.519	4th in NL East	–	–	–	–
PIT	1983	162	84	78	.519	2nd in NL East	–	–	–	–
PIT	1984	162	75	87	.463	6th in NL East	–	–	–	–
PIT	1985	161	57	104	.354	6th in NL East	–	–	–	–
PIT total		1396	711	685	.509		7	3	.700	
ATL	1986	161	72	89	.447	6th in NL West	–	–	–	–
ATL	1987	161	69	92	.429	5th in NL West	–	–	–	–
ATL	1988	39	12	27	.308	6th in NL West	–	–	–	–
ATL total		361	153	208	.424		0	0	–	
Total		2733	1352	1381	.495		7	3	.700	

== Front office career ==
After spending five seasons as a special assistant to the general manager of the Cleveland Indians, Tanner was named a senior advisor to new Pittsburgh Pirates GM Neal Huntington in the autumn of 2007.

== Other honors ==
In 2006, he was invited to be a coach in the 2006 All-Star Game by National League manager Phil Garner, who had played for both the Athletics and the Pirates during Tanner's tenure as manager. Prior to the start of the game, Tanner threw out the ceremonial first pitch.

In 2007, the Rotary Club of Pittsburgh began the Chuck Tanner Baseball Manager of the Year Award. For the first three years, the award was given to a manager in Major League Baseball. In 2010, a second award was presented to the "Chuck Tanner Collegiate Baseball Manager of the Year"; the original award was renamed the "Chuck Tanner Major League Baseball Manager of the Year Award".

== Personal life ==
He was the father of former major league player and coach Bruce Tanner. Tanner later opened a restaurant in his hometown of New Castle, Pennsylvania, which has since been sold but remains under the name, "Chuck Tanner's Restaurant". Tanner died at age 82 on February 11, 2011, in New Castle after a long illness.

== See also ==
- List of Major League Baseball players with a home run in their first major league at bat
- List of Major League Baseball managers with most career wins
