= Eddie Leon =

American baseball player (born 1946)

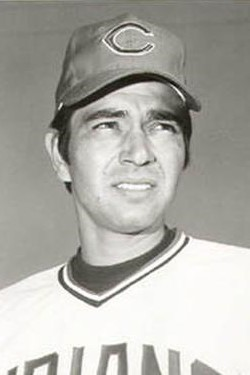
- Shortstop / Second baseman
- Born: August 11, 1946 (age 80); Tucson, Arizona, U.S.
- Batted: Right Threw: Right

MLB debut
- June 29, 1968, for the Cleveland Indians

Last MLB appearance
- May 4, 1975, for the New York Yankees

MLB statistics
- Batting average: .236
- Home runs: 24
- Runs batted in: 159
- Stats at Baseball Reference

Teams
- Cleveland Indians (1968–1972); Chicago White Sox (1973–1974); New York Yankees (1975)

Eduardo Antonio Leon (/liːˈoʊn/ lee-OHN; born August 11, 1946) is an American former Major League Baseball infielder of Mexican American descent, who played for eight seasons, splitting time as a shortstop and second baseman. He played for the Cleveland Indians from 1968 to 1972, the Chicago White Sox in 1973 and 1974, and the New York Yankees in 1975 until being released on May 5 of that year. He had been traded from the Indians to the White Sox for Walt Williams and then from the White Sox to the Yankees for Cecil Upshaw at the Winter Meetings on December 5, 1974.

In 601 games over eight seasons, Leon posted a .236 batting average (440-for-1862) with 165 runs, 24 home runs, 159 RBI and 156 bases on balls. Defensively, he recorded an overall .974 fielding percentage playing at second base and shortstop.
