= Dan Neumeier =

American baseball player (born 1948)

- Pitcher
- Born: March 9, 1948 (age 78); Shawano, Wisconsin, U.S.
- Batted: Right Threw: Right

MLB debut
- September 8, 1972, for the Chicago White Sox

Last MLB appearance
- October 4, 1972, for the Chicago White Sox

MLB statistics
- Win–loss record: 0–0
- Earned run average: 9.00
- Strikeouts: 0
- Stats at Baseball Reference

Teams
- Chicago White Sox (1972)

Daniel George Neumeier (born March 9, 1948) is a retired American professional baseball pitcher who appeared in three games in Major League Baseball, all in relief, for the 1972 Chicago White Sox. Born in Shawano, Wisconsin, he graduated from Gresham High School and attended the University of Wisconsin at Oshkosh. He threw and batted right-handed, and was listed as 6 feet 5 inches (1.96 m) tall and 205 pounds (93 kg).

Neumeier's seven-year pro baseball career began when the White Sox selected him in the third round of the 1968 Major League Baseball draft. Previously, he was drafted by the Washington Senators, but did not sign with them. Neumeier was recalled by Chicago after the 1972 minor-league season and worked a total of three innings, allowing three hits, three bases on balls and three earned runs. He did not get a decision or a save.

The following year, on December 4, he was traded to the Houston Astros for infielder Héctor Torres, and he split 1974 between the Triple-A affiliates of the Astros and San Diego Padres before leaving the game.
