= Steve Kealey =

American baseball player (born 1947)

- Pitcher
- Born: May 13, 1947 (age 79); Torrance, California, U.S.
- Batted: Right Threw: Right

MLB debut
- September 9, 1968, for the California Angels

Last MLB appearance
- July 8, 1973, for the Chicago White Sox

MLB statistics
- Win–loss record: 8–5
- Earned run average: 4.28
- Strikeouts: 126
- Stats at Baseball Reference

Teams
- California Angels (1968–1970); Chicago White Sox (1971–1973)

Steven William Kealey (born May 13, 1947) is an American former Major League Baseball pitcher for the California Angels and Chicago White Sox from 1968 to 1973. Kealey had been the most recent White Sox pitcher to hit a home run in a game until Jon Garland hit one in a game against the Cincinnati Reds on June 18, 2006.

The 6 ft (1.8 m), 185 lb (84 kg) Kealey appeared in 139 Major League games, four as a starting pitcher. He had one complete game, one shutout, 11 saves and 126 strikeouts in 214⅓ innings pitched, allowing 219 hits and 69 bases on balls.
