= Hugh Yancy =

American baseball player (born 1949)

- Infielder
- Born: October 16, 1949 (age 76); Sarasota, Florida, U.S.
- Batted: Right Threw: Right

MLB debut
- July 5, 1972, for the Chicago White Sox

Last MLB appearance
- May 29, 1976, for the Chicago White Sox

MLB statistics
- Batting average: .105
- Home runs: 0
- Runs batted in: 0
- Stats at Baseball Reference

Teams
- Chicago White Sox (1972, 1974, 1976)

Hugh Yancy (born October 16, 1949) is an American former professional baseball player. He appeared in 7 games spread across 3 seasons in Major League Baseball for the Chicago White Sox between 1972 and 1976. He bats and throws right-handed.

The Chicago White Sox drafted Yancy in the 1968 Major League Baseball draft. In 1972, he appeared in three games as a second baseman, getting one hit in nine at bats. In 1974, he appeared in one game as a pinch hitter, executing a sacrifice bunt in his lone plate appearance. Then, in 1976, he appeared in three more games as a third baseman, getting one hit in ten at-bats.

After the 1976 season, Yancy was traded to the Cincinnati Reds, but never again played in the major leagues. He played one season in the Reds organization, then played in the Cleveland Indians organization in 1978-79 before retiring.
