= Jim Geddes =

American baseball player (born 1949)

- Pitcher
- Born: March 23, 1949 (age 77); Columbus, Ohio, U.S.
- Batted: Right Threw: Right

MLB debut
- April 28, 1972, for the Chicago White Sox

Last MLB appearance
- September 29, 1973, for the Chicago White Sox

MLB statistics
- Win–loss record: 0–0
- ERA: 4.50
- Strikeouts: 10
- Stats at Baseball Reference

Teams
- Chicago White Sox (1972–1973)

James Lee Geddes (born March 23, 1949) is an American former professional baseball pitcher who appeared in 11 career games for the Chicago White Sox of Major League Baseball in 1972 and 1973. Born in Columbus, Ohio, he graduated from Ohio State University, where he played baseball and basketball. He threw and batted right-handed, and was listed as 6 feet 2 inches (1.88 m) tall and 205 pounds (93 kg).

The ChiSox selected Geddes in the sixth round of the 1970 Major League Baseball draft and he debuted in 1971 with the Double-A Asheville Tourists, where he appeared in 28 games, evenly divided between starting and relief assignments, split 12 decisions, and posted a 3.65 earned run average with four complete games, a shutout, and three saves.

He made the 1972 White Sox' early season roster, and worked in five games sprinkled throughout the season, with one start, and compiled a poor 6.97 earned run average in 101/3 innings pitched. He also spent part of the year back in Double-A. He also split 1973 between the White Sox and the minor leagues, although he had considerably more success in the big leagues than he had in 1972. In six appearances and 152/3 innings pitched, he lowered his ERA to 2.87. As in 1972, he made one start, and did not earn a decision or a save.

Geddes returned to the minors in 1973 for the rest of his five-year pro career. His MLB tenure was hampered by poor control, as he issued 24 bases on balls in 26 innings pitched. He struck out ten and permitted 14 hits.
