= Bart Johnson (baseball) =

American baseball player (1950–2020)

- Pitcher
- Born: January 3, 1950; Torrance, California, U.S.
- Died: April 22, 2020 (aged 70); Palos Heights, Illinois, U.S.
- Batted: Right Threw: Right

MLB debut
- September 8, 1969, for the Chicago White Sox

Last MLB appearance
- September 21, 1977, for the Chicago White Sox

MLB statistics
- Win–loss record: 43–51
- Earned run average: 3.94
- Strikeouts: 520
- Stats at Baseball Reference

Teams
- Chicago White Sox (1969–1974, 1976–1977)

Clair Barth Johnson (January 3, 1950 – April 22, 2020) was an American professional baseball player, a right-handed pitcher who played in the Major Leagues between 1969–1977 for the Chicago White Sox.

From 1980 to 1997, Johnson was a scout for the White Sox.

As a high school basketball player at Torrance High School, Johnson set the CIF Southern Section record for points scored with 1,917, breaking the previous record of 1,901 set by Billy Kilmer.

Johnson lived in Oak Lawn, Illinois. He died on April 22, 2020, in Palos Heights, Illinois, from complications of Parkinson's disease.
