= Cy Acosta =

Mexican baseball player (born 1946)

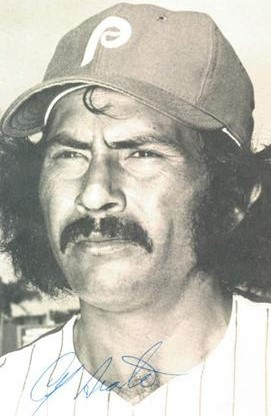
- Pitcher
- Born: 22 November 1946 (age 79); El Sabino, Sinaloa, Mexico
- Batted: Right Threw: Right

MLB debut
- June 4, 1972, for the Chicago White Sox

Last MLB appearance
- May 5, 1975, for the Philadelphia Phillies

MLB statistics
- Win–loss record: 13–9
- Earned run average: 2.66
- Strikeouts: 109
- Stats at Baseball Reference

Teams
- Chicago White Sox (1972–1974); Philadelphia Phillies (1975)

Member of the Mexican Professional

Baseball Hall of Fame
- Induction: 2005

Cecilio Acosta Miranda (born 22 November 1946) is a Mexican former relief pitcher in Major League Baseball who played four seasons for the Chicago White Sox and Philadelphia Phillies. Acosta also spend 17 seasons playing in the Mexican League and the Mexican Pacific League.

Acosta became the first American League pitcher to make a plate appearance after the introduction of the designated hitter rule in 1973, doing so on 20 June 1973.

== Career ==
Acosta was born on 22 November 1946 in El Sabino, Guasave Municipality, Sinaloa, Mexico. He made his professional debut in 1966 playing for the Mineros de Fresnillo of the Mexican Central League, a minor league circuit affiliated to the Mexican League, and was promoted in 1968 to the AAA Charros de Jalisco. He played four seasons with the Charros and in 1971 he was signed by the Tucson Toros of the Pacific Coast League. In 1972, Acosta made his MLB debut playing for the Chicago White Sox.

On 17 July 2005, Acosta was inducted into the Mexican Professional Baseball Hall of Fame as part of that year's class.
