= Tony Muser =

American baseball player, coach, and manager (born 1947)

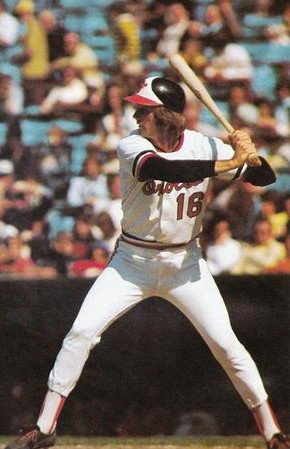
- First baseman / Manager
- Born: August 1, 1947 (age 78); Los Angeles, California, U.S.
- Batted: Left Threw: Left

MLB debut
- September 14, 1969, for the Boston Red Sox

Last MLB appearance
- October 1, 1978, for the Milwaukee Brewers

MLB statistics
- Batting average: .259
- Home runs: 7
- Runs batted in: 117
- Managerial record: 317–431
- Winning %: .424
- Stats at Baseball Reference

Teams
- As player: Boston Red Sox (1969); Chicago White Sox (1971–1975); Baltimore Orioles (1975–1977); Milwaukee Brewers (1978); Seibu Lions (1979); As manager: Kansas City Royals (1997–2002); As coach: Milwaukee Brewers (1985–1989); Chicago Cubs (1993–1997); San Diego Padres (2003–2006)

Anthony Joseph Muser (/ˈmjuːzər/; born August 1, 1947) is an American former professional baseball player who currently serves as a roving instructor in the San Diego Padres organization. He played professionally in Major League Baseball (MLB) for nine seasons. From 1997 to 2002, Muser served as the manager of the Kansas City Royals. After being replaced by John Mizerock, Muser spent four seasons as the bench coach for the Padres under Bruce Bochy.

== Playing career ==
Signed as an amateur free agent by the Boston Red Sox in 1967, Muser spent parts of nine seasons in the majors between 1969 and 1978. After debuting with the Red Sox, he also played for the Chicago White Sox, Baltimore Orioles, and Milwaukee Brewers. In 1973, he was the White Sox starting first baseman, setting career highs with 4 home runs and 30 runs batted in while batting .285 in 109 games. After batting .260 during the first 2 1/2 months of the campaign, Muser was acquired by the Orioles from the White Sox for Jesse Jefferson in one of two transactions made by Chicago at the non-waiver trade deadline on June 15, 1975. Following his major league career, he played in Japan for the Seibu Lions in 1979.

Muser played mostly first base, but did not hit for much in the way of average or power at a position that is historically more known for offense than defense. He had a lifetime .259 batting average and only seven home runs in his entire career.

== Post-playing career ==
=== Coach and minor league manager ===
In 1980, Muser was brought back into the Brewers organization, as he was hired as manager of the Stockton Ports, one of Milwaukee's A-ball farm clubs. The Ports won the league championship in 1980, and Muser was moved up to the Double-A El Paso Diablos. After two-plus seasons in El Paso, during which Muser's teams went 176–162, Muser was promoted again, this time to the Triple-A Vancouver Canadians, where he replaced Dick Phillips in midseason. After a season and a half there, Muser was moved up to the Brewers' coaching staff, where he served as third base coach from 1985 through spring training in 1986 when he was severely injured in a gas explosion in the Compadre Stadium clubhouse and missed the rest of the 1986 season. Muser was in line to succeed George Bamberger as manager but because of his injuries was replaced as third base coach by Tom Trebelhorn who went on to manage the Brewers for five years. Muser returned as hitting coach from 1987 until 1989. In 1991 and 1992, Muser was back at Triple-A, managing the Denver Zephyrs, the Brewers' top farm team.

In 1993, Muser moved to the Chicago Cubs, where he served as their hitting coach until 1997, when he was named manager of the Kansas City Royals.

=== Royals manager ===
On July 9, 1997, Muser replaced Bob Boone as manager of the Kansas City Royals. The Royals were 36–46 at the time, but finished the season even worse, going 31–48 under Muser, finishing 4th in the American League Central. Starting in 1998, the Royals would finish 3rd, 4th, 4th, and 5th in the five-team division. After starting the 2002 season 8–15, Muser was fired as manager and replaced by John Mizerock.

=== Back to coaching ===
After being let go by the Royals, Muser was named to the San Diego Padres coaching staff for 2003. He served as the Padres' bench coach until 2006, then returned to the minor leagues as a manager. In 2007, Muser was the manager for the Peoria Padres, the Padres' rookie level team in the Arizona League. In 2008, he became a roving minor league instructor for the Padres.

== Managerial records ==
Team	Year	Regular Season				Post Season			
Team	Year	Won	Lost	Win %	Finish	Won	Lost	Win %	Result
KC	1997	31	48	.392	5th in AL Central	–	–	–	-
KC	1998	72	89	.447	3rd in AL Central	–	–	–	-
KC	1999	64	97	.398	4th in AL Central	–	–	–	-
KC	2000	77	85	.485	4th in AL Central	–	–	–	-
KC	2001	65	97	.401	5th in AL Central	–	–	–	-
KC	2002	8	15	.348	4th in AL Central	–	–	–	(fired)
Total		317	431	.424					

Preceded by Lee Sigman	Stockton Ports Manager; 1980	Succeeded by Duane Espy
Preceded by Jim Saul	El Paso Diablos Manager; 1981–1983	Succeeded by Lee Sigman
Preceded by Dick Phillips	Vancouver Canadians Manager; 1983–1985	Succeeded by Tom Trebelhorn
Preceded by	Milwaukee Brewers Third Base Coach; 1985–1986	Succeeded by Tom Trebelhorn
Preceded by Frank Howard	Milwaukee Brewers Hitting Coach; 1987–1989	Succeeded by Don Baylor
Preceded by Dave Machemer	Denver Zephyrs Manager; 1991–1992	Succeeded by last manager
Preceded by Sammy Ellis	Chicago Cubs Bullpen Coach; 1993	Succeeded by Marv Foley
Preceded by Tom Trebelhorn	Chicago Cubs Third Base Coach; 1994–1996	Succeeded by Dan Radison
Preceded by ??	Chicago Cubs Hitting Coach; 1997	Succeeded by Jeff Pentland
Preceded by Rob Picciolo	San Diego Padres Bench Coach; 2003–2006	Succeeded by Craig Colbert
Preceded by Carlos Lezcano	AZL Padres Manager; 2007	Succeeded by Jose Flores
