= Wilbur Wood =

American baseball player (1941–2026)

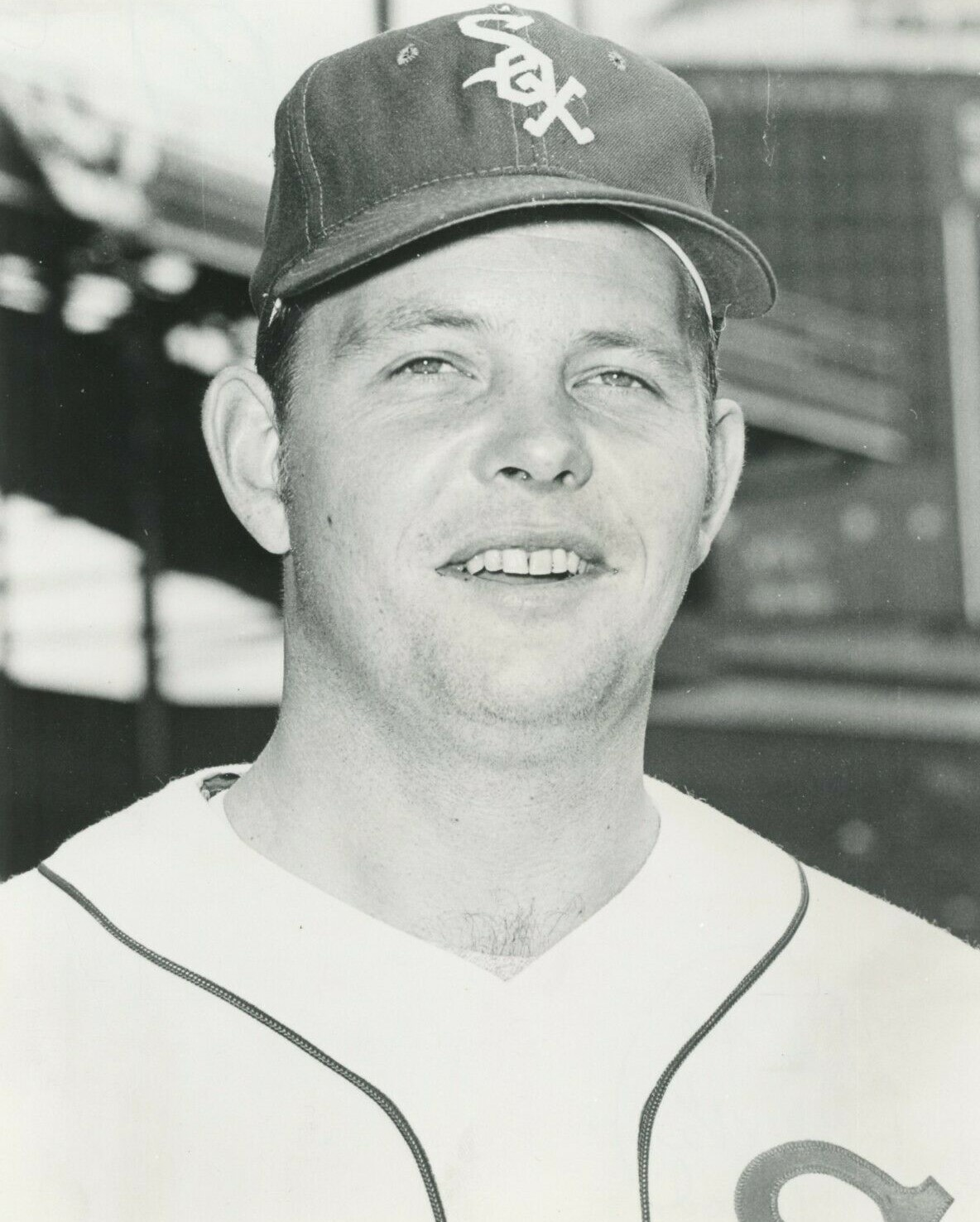
- Wood in 1969
- Pitcher
- Born: October 22, 1941; Cambridge, Massachusetts, U.S.
- Died: January 17, 2026 (aged 84); Burlington, Massachusetts, U.S.
- Batted: Right Threw: Left

MLB debut
- June 30, 1961, for the Boston Red Sox

Last MLB appearance
- August 22, 1978, for the Chicago White Sox

MLB statistics
- Win–loss record: 164–156
- Earned run average: 3.24
- Strikeouts: 1,411
- Stats at Baseball Reference

Teams
- Boston Red Sox (1961–1964); Pittsburgh Pirates (1964–1965); Chicago White Sox (1967–1978)

Career highlights and awards
- 3× All-Star (1971, 1972, 1974); 2× AL wins leader (1972, 1973)

Wilbur Forrester Wood Jr. (October 22, 1941 – January 17, 2026) was an American professional baseball pitcher. In a 17-year Major League Baseball (MLB) career, he pitched for the Boston Red Sox (1961–1964), the Pittsburgh Pirates (1964–1965), and the Chicago White Sox (1967–1978). A knuckleball specialist after joining the White Sox, he threw left-handed and batted right-handed.

Raised in Belmont, Massachusetts, Wood played several sports in high school and was signed by his hometown Boston Red Sox in 1960. He pitched sparingly for them over parts of four seasons before being traded to the Pittsburgh Pirates in 1964. Seldom-used by the team in 1965, he spent all of 1966 in the minor leagues before being traded to the White Sox. Wood, who had previously relied on a fastball and curveball, refined the knuckleball with the help of veteran knuckleball specialist Hoyt Wilhelm. He spent the next four seasons as a relief pitcher for Chicago. In 1968, he set a record (broken the next year) with 88 games pitched and was named the Sporting News American League (AL) Fireman of the Year.

The White Sox tried to trade Wood before the 1971 season, but an injury to starting pitcher Joe Horlen caused them to put him in the starting rotation. That season, pitching coach Johnny Sain suggested that Wood pitch with only two days' rest between starts, since knuckleball specialists do not put as much stress on their arms as other pitchers. Wood proceeded to lead the AL in games started from 1972 through 1975, starting a career-high 49 games in 1972. That season, he also recorded a career-high 376 2/3 innings pitched (IP), breaking the live-ball era record of 376 IP set by Mickey Lolich of the Detroit Tigers just one season prior. He won 20 or more games for four consecutive seasons, leading the AL in 1972 and 1973 with 24 wins. In 1973, Wood also matched the 1916 record of Walter Johnson of a pitcher to win and lose 20 or more games in a season. Wood was an All-Star in 1971, 1972, and 1974.

After making 43 starts in 1975, Wood made only seven in 1976. A line drive off the bat of Ron LeFlore fractured Wood's kneecap in a game against the Detroit Tigers. Despite months of rehabilitation, Wood was "gun-shy" upon his return in 1977 and posted the worst earned run average among qualifying AL pitchers in 1978 (5.20). He retired after the season. Wood's 90 wins from 1971–74 were the most by a major league pitcher during that span. A lifelong New England resident, Wood held a number of jobs in the Boston area after his retirement from baseball.

== Early life ==
Wilbur Forrester Wood Jr. was born in Cambridge, Massachusetts, on October 22, 1941. His parents were Wilbur Sr., a wholesale foods employee, and Svea (née Swenson). Wilbur grew up in Belmont, Massachusetts, with his younger brother, Jimmy. The brothers were athletic and would play sports year-round. Wood attended Belmont High School, where he played in three different sports: baseball, as a pitcher; football, as the starting quarterback; and hockey, as a defenseman. His father, a semi-professional baseball player, taught him how to throw a knuckleball while he was in high school, but Wood relied on his fastball and curveball in actual games. Using just two pitches, he helped the baseball team win the state championship in 1959 (his junior year), and he finished his high school career with a 24–2 record. He also played for American Legion Post 99, winning 42 games.

According to Bill Stone, Wood's high school baseball coach, about 50 colleges wanted the prospect for one sport or another. Wood, however, wanted to play professional baseball, and he was drawing interest from the St. Louis Cardinals, the Milwaukee Braves, and the Boston Red Sox. The Braves paid for him to fly to Milwaukee for a tryout, where minor league director Roland Hemond was unimpressed. "He was a chubby little guy who didn't throw very hard. I watched him throw batting practice (and) couldn't get very excited." The Red Sox, however, hoped to boost ticket sales by having a hometown prospect turn into a sensation. They offered a significant bonus (reportedly from $25,000 to $50,000), and Wood accepted their offer. "I wanted to play for the Red Sox," Wood said of his hometown team in a 1989 interview, "but at that point I wanted the club that offered me the most amount of bonus money."

== Professional career ==
=== Boston Red Sox (1961–64) ===
Wood began his professional career in 1960 with the Class D Waterloo Hawks of the Midwest League. He won his only decision in four games with the club, posting a 2.70 earned run average (ERA) before getting promoted to the Raleigh Capitals of the Class B Carolina League. With Raleigh, he had a 3–5 record and a 3.84 ERA in 13 games (12 starts). After the season, Boston added him to its 40-man roster.

In 1961, Wood attended spring training with the Red Sox for the first time. In his first inning of work, he struck out three San Francisco Giants hitters, prompting the Boston Globe to declare that he would have "spectacular success" in his career. Sent to the Class B Winston-Salem Red Sox to begin the season, he posted an 8–5 record with a 3.15 ERA, 103 strikeouts, 33 walks, and 99 hits allowed in 111 1/3 innings pitched. Having trouble with their attendance numbers, the Red Sox promoted the young Wood to the major leagues in the middle of June. He made his major league debut at Fenway Park on June 30, allowing three hits and two runs while striking out three over the final four innings of a 10–2 loss to the Cleveland Indians. In the second game of a July 19 doubleheader, he made his first major league start (also against Cleveland), allowing three runs in three innings but not getting the decision in an eventual 9–8 defeat. He appeared in six games (one start) for the Red Sox, posting no record, a 5.54 ERA, seven strikeouts, seven walks, and 14 hits allowed in 14 innings before getting sent back to the minors in late July, this time to the Johnstown Red Sox of the Class A Eastern League. Wood did not pitch well there, losing seven of 10 decisions and posting a 4.62 ERA with 44 strikeouts, 15 walks, and 80 hits allowed in 74 innings.

Boston's Eastern League affiliation became the York White Roses in 1962, and Wood ranked among the league leaders by season's end. He finished tied for second in wins (15, tied with Dave McNally and Sonny Siebert behind Paul Seitz's 16), sixth in ERA (2.84), sixth in strikeouts (178), and third in hits allowed (198, behind Jay Ritchie's 209 and Richard Slomkowski's 202). His 219 innings pitched topped the league. Promoted to Boston in September, he made one start for the Red Sox on the 22nd, allowing three runs in 7 2/3 innings but receiving a no decision in a 4–3 loss to the Washington Senators.

In 1963, Wood was one of the last pitchers cut in spring training. He opened the season with the Class AAA Seattle Rainiers of the Pacific Coast League, but after recording a 1.12 ERA and winning five of seven decisions, he joined the Red Sox in early June. Boston initially used him as a starter, but he lost four games and allowed 39 hits in 28 innings before getting moved to the bullpen in early July, where he spent the rest of the season. "The little sonofagun just couldn't throw hard enough," manager Johnny Pesky said. "But he wanted to pitch and tried his hardest." As a relief pitcher, he recorded a 2.45 ERA in 36 2/3 innings pitched. In 25 games (six starts), he had an 0–5 record, a 3.76 ERA, 28 strikeouts, 13 walks, and 67 walks in 64 2/3 innings pitched.

Though Wood began the 1964 season with Boston, he was given his outright release to Seattle in the midst of May after posting a 17.47 ERA in four games. Pitching coach Bob Turley thought he was not suited to success at Fenway Park. Spending the next few months in Seattle, Wood posted a 15–8 record, ranking among the league leaders in wins (tied for third with three other pitchers behind Bob Locker's and Ken Rowe's 16), ERA (2.30, second to Bruce Howard's 2.20), strikeouts (197, second to Al Stanek's 220), and innings pitched (211, seventh). He was also selected to the league's All-Star team. The Red Sox chose not to promote him in September, but Wood had his contract purchased by the Pittsburgh Pirates on September 6.

=== Pittsburgh Pirates (1964–65) ===
Wood appeared in three games towards the end of the year with the Pirates, including two starts. On October 2, he held the Braves to two runs through nine innings, but the Pirates only scored two, and the game went to the 10th. The Braves loaded the bases against Wood, who then walked Woody Woodward to force in a run. Though it was his first complete game in the major leagues, he still had yet to win a game in parts of four seasons at the big league level.

1965 was Wood's first full season on a major league roster, though his appearances (all but one of which were out of the bullpen) were seldom. According to Gregory H. Wolf of the Society for American Baseball Research, Wood's "soft-spoken and amiable" nature led to a personality clash with the "brash" Harry Walker, who managed Pittsburgh. On August 29, he relieved Bob Friend in the sixth inning of a 2–2 game against the Houston Astros after Friend had allowed the first two hitters to reach base. Retiring all three men he faced, Wood was ultimately credited with the win, his first, after Pittsburgh took the lead in the seventh. In 34 games, he had a 1–1 record, a 3.16 ERA, 29 strikeouts, 16 walks, and 44 hits allowed in 51 1/3 innings pitched.

In 1966, Wood was one of the first Pirates' pitchers cut from major league spring training. He said that he "thought about quitting baseball, but my wife encouraged me to try one more time." "I think he might have gone into the plumbing business with my father," his wife said. With the Class AAA Columbus Jets of the International League, he had what Wolf called "the hitherto best year of his career at arguably the most crucial point." Wood was named the International League's Most Outstanding Pitcher, leading the circuit in ERA (2.41), complete games (15), shutouts (8), and innings pitched (224). Additionally, his 14 wins tied for third in the league (with Billy Rohr behind Gary Waslewski's 18 and Ed Barnowski's 17); he lost just eight times, for a winning percentage of .636. Though the Pirates chose not to call him up after the year, his performance impressed George Maltzberger, a scout for the Chicago White Sox, who recommended the pitcher to general manager (GM) Ed Short. On October 12, the Pirates traded Wood to the White Sox for a player to be named later (ultimately Juan Pizarro).

=== Chicago White Sox (1967–78) ===
==== Relief pitcher (1967–70) ====
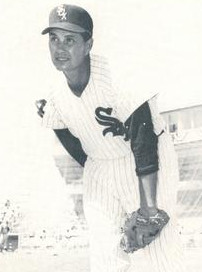
Veteran Hoyt Wilhelm helped Wood refine his knuckleball.

When Wood arrived at spring training with Chicago in 1967, manager Eddie Stanky immediately informed him he would be the ballclub's mop-up man. Wood realized he needed to make a change to prolong his career. Since high school, he had experimented with a knuckleball, and one of Chicago's relief pitchers was knuckleball specialist Hoyt Wilhelm, who would later be elected to the Hall of Fame. "I went to him right away and asked him if he would explain more to me about the knuckler," Wood said. Wilhelm showed Wood how to throw good knuckleballs consistently. "You either throw the knuckleball all of the time or not at all. It's not an extra pitch," Wilhelm explained. Taking Wilhelm's advice, Wood's career took off, first as a relief pitcher, and then as a starting pitcher. With the White Sox, Wood became well known as a durable workhorse and was among the last pitchers to consistently throw well over 300 innings in a season.

Wood made the roster as a relief pitcher and posted a 1.51 ERA in the first half of the season, beginning to get appearances late in games the White Sox were leading in late May. An injury to Jim O'Toole and struggles by John Buzhardt gave him an opportunity to start in July, and he won the first game of a doubleheader against the Kansas City Athletics on July 16, outpitching Catfish Hunter as he held the A's to one run in 8 1/3 innings. He was 3–0 as a starter in July, but after losing his first two starts of August, he returned to more of a relief role, though he did win a start against the New York Yankees on August 22. In 51 games (eight starts), he had a 4–2 record, four saves, a 2.45 ERA, 47 strikeouts, 28 walks, and 95 hits allowed in 95 1/3 innings pitched.

Wilhelm continued to help Wood with his knuckleball in 1968 spring training, and White Sox pitching coach Marv Grissom convinced Wood to do away with his pitching windup. Wood had been reducing it since the previous year, but dispensing with it entirely allowed him to sneakily throw his fastball to hitters, making it a deceptive counterpart to the knuckleball. Struggles experienced by Bob Locker led to Stanky utilizing Wood at the end of games more often beginning in May. On June 23, he started the second game of a doubleheader against the Red Sox, holding Boston to one run in eight innings in a 10–1 win. He made one other start on August 10, allowing one earned run in six innings against the Indians, though an error by Duane Josephson led to two unearned runs scoring as well, and Wood took the loss in the 3–2 defeat. On September 1, he pitched the final five innings of a game against the Minnesota Twins, allowing just one run (a home run to Harmon Killebrew) as he picked up the victory in a 5–4 win. He set a major league record on September 21 with his 83rd appearance of the year. Wood finished the season with 88 games pitched, briefly a record until Wayne Granger appeared in 90 for the Cincinnati Reds the next year. As of 2020, his 88 games pitched ties him with four other relievers for 15th-most in a season. He had a 13–12 record (leading the White Sox in wins), a 1.87 ERA, 74 strikeouts, 33 walks, and 127 hits allowed in 159 innings pitched. Though the save would not become an official statistic until 1969, Wood was retroactively credited with 16, second in the American League (AL) to Al Worthington's 18. Wood also led the AL with 46 games finished. Sportswriter Jerome Holtzman said he was "sensational," and Stanky, dismissed partway through the season, said "he's an amazing pitcher." The Sporting News named him its AL Fireman of the Year. Wood also finished 25th in AL Most Valuable Player (MVP) voting.

Wood again served as a late-inning reliever for the White Sox in 1969. On April 13, he had his longest outing of the year, allowing two runs in 5 2/3 innings in relief of Gary Peters but earning the win in a 12–7 triumph over the Seattle Pilots. Also against the Pilots in the first game of a June 24 doubleheader, he relieved Dan Osinski with the bases loaded and one out in the sixth inning of a tie ballgame. Wood got Mike Hegan to ground into a force play at home, retired Tommy Harper on a groundout to end the inning, then pitched three more scoreless innings, earning the win in Chicago's 6–4 triumph. In the second game of a July 13 doubleheader, he pitched four scoreless innings for the save in a 4–1 victory over the Kansas City Royals. Wood again led the AL in appearances with 76, ranked second in games finished (50) to Ron Perranoski (52), and finished sixth with 15 saves. He had a 10–11 record, a 3.01 ERA, 73 strikeouts, 40 walks, and 113 hits allowed in 119 2/3 innings pitched.

On May 26, 1970, Wood relieved Gerry Janeski with one out in the seventh, bases loaded, and the White Sox holding on to a 3–0 lead over Kansas City. He allowed a single to Paul Schaal that drove in a run but finished the inning without any more runs scoring, then a scoreless eighth and ninth inning for the save. In the second game of a doubleheader against the Oakland Athletics on June 21, Wood struck out four consecutive hitters and five of six he faced in two innings, though the effort came in a 5–4 loss. He struck out four batters in a season-high 3 2/3 innings on July 25, though this came in a 9–4 loss to the Detroit Tigers. His longest save of the year came on August 12, when he held the Yankees hitless for three innings and struck out three in a 5–1 triumph. Wood led the AL in games pitched (77) for a third consecutive season, also leading the league in games finished (62) and ranking sixth in the AL with 21 saves. He had a 9–13 record, a 2.81 ERA, 85 strikeouts, 36 walks, and 118 hits allowed in 121 2/3 innings pitched.

==== All-Star workhorse (1971–75) ====
In 1971, there was disagreement among the White Sox management about what to do with Wood. New manager Chuck Tanner wanted to make him a starter, but GM Hemond (the same person who had been unimpressed with Wood when he had tried out for the Braves in 1960) wanted to trade him to the California Angels as the White Sox built a roster around younger players; the Angels, however, were not interested in a trade. Wood also recalled that the team wanted to trade him to the Senators for Darold Knowles but was unable to because he was holding out for more money. Entering the 1971 season, Wood was poised to be a reliever again, but he was added to the starting rotation on the final day of spring training after Joe Horlen broke his leg. At the time, Phil and Joe Niekro were the only other starting pitchers that relied on a knuckleball.

Wood failed to record a decision in the month of April, but he won three games in May. On the 22nd of that month, he picked up his first shutout, holding the Angels to six hits in a 13–0 victory. Though pitchers usually started with three days off in between starts at the time, pitching coach Johnny Sain felt that Wood could throw with two days off, owing to the lower stress that throwing a knuckleball places on a pitcher's arm. Tanner and Wood both liked the idea, and Tanner started scheduling Wood more frequently at the end of June. In his first start on two days' rest, he held the Milwaukee Brewers to one earned run in a complete game, striking out nine in an 8–3 victory. Two of his following three starts were shutouts, and he finished the first half of the season with a 9–5 record and a 1.69 ERA. Wood was named to the AL All-Star Team for the first time, though he did not pitch in the All-Star Game. Later in the year, he completed seven of his final eight games, three of which were shutouts. On September 12, he won 20 games in a season for the first time with a nine-strikeout, five-hit shutout performance against the Royals. In his final start of the year, against the Brewers on September 29, he allowed one unearned run in a complete game and struck out 10 hitters in a 2–1 victory. As a result of the increased frequency of his starts, Wood started 42 games and pitched 334 innings, second only in the AL to Mickey Lolich (45 and 376, respectively). He ranked among the AL leaders with 22 wins (third, behind Lolich's 25 and Vida Blue's 24), a 1.91 ERA (second only to Blue's 1.82), 210 strikeouts (fifth), 22 complete games (third, behind Lolich's 29 and Blue's 24), and seven shutouts (tied with Mel Stottlemyre for second behind Blue's eight). His 189 adjusted ERA+ led the AL, and his Wins Above Replacement (WAR) of 11.5 is the fourth-highest for pitchers since 1920, topped only by Dwight Gooden's 11.9 (1985), Steve Carlton's 11.7 (1972), and Roger Clemens's 11.6 (1997). He finished ninth in AL MVP voting and third in AL Cy Young Award voting (behind Blue and Lolich). With 22 wins, Wood set a major league record (tied in 2001 by Matt Morris) for most wins by a pitcher who had made at least 10 appearances the previous season without starting a game. "I feel no difference, physically or mentally, between two and three days of rest," Wood said about pitching more often. "Everybody thinks I should be more tired, but I am not."

Still starting about every three games in 1972, Wood allowed the White Sox to mainly use a three-man rotation, with Stan Bahnsen and Tom Bradley starting every fourth day and other hurlers making spot starts in between. He was the Opening Day starter for Chicago beginning in 1972, the first of five consecutive seasons he would make the Opening Day start for the White Sox. He took a no decision despite allowing one run in nine innings, but he followed that up with shutouts in his next three games. On June 13, he threw another shutout, holding the Yankees to three hits in a 2–0 victory. He limited the Athletics to seven hits in a shutout on June 29, outpitching Hunter in a 4–0 victory. At midseason, he was selected to the AL All-Star Team for a second consecutive season. Wood entered in the eighth with the AL up 3–2 but blew the lead in the ninth when he gave up an RBI-groundout to Lee May in the AL's 4–3, 10-inning loss. In August, he won five consecutive decisions, not losing until his ninth and final start of the month. On August 9, he threw a six-hit shutout against the Angels, supplying the only run with an RBI single against Nolan Ryan in the seventh inning. Three days later, he pitched 11 innings against the Athletics, allowing a career-low two hits in a 3–1 victory, his 20th. He began September with two consecutive shutouts, boosting his record to 24–12. However, he was winless in his last seven starts, losing five of the games. Wood's success in 1972 helped the White Sox, not projected to do well that season, take the AL West lead in August, though they finished the season 5 1/2 games back of the eventual World Series champion Athletics.

Wood set career highs in starts and innings pitched in 1972. His 376 2/3 innings pitched were the highest AL total since Ed Walsh pitched 393 in 1912, and his 49 starts were the most in the league since Walsh started the same amount in 1908. Though his 17 losses tied with three others for third in the league, he tied Gaylord Perry for the AL lead with 24 wins. He led the AL with 105 earned runs allowed, but his 2.51 ERA was .01 outside the top 10 in the league. With 20 complete games, he tied Ryan for third in the league (behind Perry (29) and Lolich (23)), and his eight shutouts were second to Ryan's nine. He finished seventh with 193 strikeouts. After the season, he was named a Sporting News AL All-Star. He finished second in Cy Young voting to Perry, who edged him 64 to 58 in vote points, and he finished seventh in AL MVP voting. The Sporting News named him its AL Pitcher of the Year.

After a 1–2 start to 1973, Wood won 12 of his next 13 starts. From April 25 to May 2, he threw three consecutive shutouts. Facing Ryan in a matchup that pitted one of baseball's hardest thrower's versus one of baseball's softest on May 24, 1973, Wood held the Angels scoreless for eight innings before finally giving up a run in the ninth. He was the winner as Chicago triumphed by a score of 4–1. Ron Fimrite, reporter for Sports Illustrated, wrote that "Wood looked for all the world like a man playing catch at a picnic." For its June 4 issue, Sports Illustrated had planned to do a cover story on the Indianapolis 500, but rain postponed the race past the editing deadline. Instead, the magazine featured Wood on the cover. According to publisher Robert L. Miller, his name became a catchphrase for a backup cover story after that.

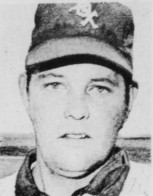
Wood with the White Sox circa 1973

On May 28, 1973, while pitching for the White Sox against the Cleveland Indians, Wood pitched the remainder of a 21-inning carryover game that had been suspended two nights earlier, allowing only two hits in five innings to earn the victory. He then started the regularly scheduled game and pitched a four-hit complete game shutout, earning two wins in the same night. This gave him 13 wins 40 games into Chicago's season. "I certainly wasn't tired tonight, and I could have pitched many more innings," he told reporters after the game. He faltered in June, though, posting a 1–8 record and a 4.43 ERA and losing six consecutive games at one point. Against the Yankees on July 20, Wood started both ends of a doubleheader, one of two pitchers to do so since Don Newcombe in 1950 (the other was Al Santorini in 1971) and the last pitcher to do so since. After he failed to get any outs in the first game and took the loss, Tanner decided to let him start Game 2. He allowed a grand slam to Roy White in Game 2 as part of seven runs in 4 1/3 innings, losing his second start of the day. Despite allowing six runs to the Twins on July 29, he won his 20th game of the year. Over the season's final two months, he posted a 4–6 record, along with a 4.36 ERA. In 1973, he led the AL with 24 wins. However, his 20 losses also ranked second in the AL, one behind teammate Bahnsen's total. It was only the ninth time since 1900 that a pitcher had won and lost 20 games in the same year, and the first time since Walter Johnson did so in 1916. He pitched 359 1/3 innings in 48 starts, both totals which led the league, finishing eighth in the AL with 199 strikeouts and sixth with 21 complete games. His ERA was 3.46. Wood finished fifth in Cy Young Award voting.

After posting a 5.27 ERA in April 1974, Wood watched films of himself pitching and shortened his stride as a result. On May 7, he pitched 11 innings against the Tigers, striking out 10, allowing a career-low two hits, and winning when Ed Herrmann homered in the 11th for the only run of the game. A five-game win streak in May came to an end on the 25th when, after Wood had held the Royals to two runs for 13 innings, an error and two hits in the 14th led to a two-RBI double by Fran Healy that ended the longest outing of Wood's career. He was selected to the AL All-Star Team for the third time in his career, though he did not pitch in the All-Star Game. On July 13, he held the Tigers to three hits and one run, striking out seven in a 7–1 victory. He had an 18–13 record on August 10, but he went 2–6 over his final 10 starts, though his ERA (3.83) was not much higher over that span than it was for his whole year (3.60). On September 2, he defeated the Royals for his 20th win of the season, pitching 10 innings and retiring Orlando Cepeda on a groundout with the bases loaded to hang on to a 6–4 victory. Wood again led the AL in starts (42), though his 320 1/3 innings pitched were topped by Ryan (332 2/3), Fergie Jenkins (328 1/3), and Perry (322 1/3). His 20 wins ranked ninth in the AL, and his 19 losses were tied with four other pitchers for third (behind Lolich's 21 and Clyde Wright's 20). Wood completed 22 games (seventh in the AL) and struck out 169 hitters. During the years 1971–74, Wood averaged 45 games started and 347 innings pitched. He led the major leagues in wins (90) by two over Hunter, though he also led the majors with 69 losses.

In 1975, Wood was "an early season dud," according to Sports Illustrated. In his second start of the year, with the game against the Angels tied at three after nine innings, he pitched into the 10th but lost after giving up a walk-off home run to Leroy Stanton. He was 6–13 through July 8, but he picked up shutouts in his next two starts, holding Milwaukee and Detroit to a total of five singles in the two games. The latter of the two was his third and final two-hit game. Beginning with the shutouts, Wood won his next six decisions, putting him one win away from a .500 winning percentage before he lost three consecutive games from August 8 through 16. For the remainder of the year, he was 4–4 with a 4.39 ERA. In his final start of the year on September 25, he held the Athletics to five hits and two unearned runs in a complete game, 8–2 victory. Wolf wrote that he was "gradually losing some effectiveness" but "had moments of baffling dominance." He had a losing record for the first time since 1970, leading the AL with 20 losses while only winning 16 games. He failed to reach 300 innings pitched for the first time since 1970 (291 1/3, fifth in the AL) but led the league in starts (43) for the fourth and final consecutive season. His ERA was 4.11, and he struck out 140.

==== Injury, later years (1976–78) ====
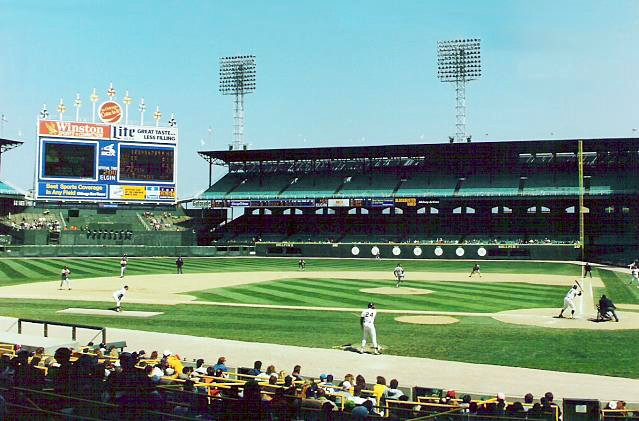
Comiskey Park was Wood's home stadium during his time with the White Sox.

Wood started consecutive games for the White Sox in 1976, pitching in their ninth game on April 23 and their 10th game five days later, though he lost both of them. His 1976 campaign was cut short on May 9 when a line drive single hit by Ron LeFlore fractured his left kneecap in the sixth inning of a 4–2 White Sox victory over Detroit at Tiger Stadium. He had surgery the next day and was out for the rest of the season. In seven starts, he had posted a 4–3 record, a 2.24 ERA, 31 strikeouts, 11 walks, and 51 hits allowed in 56 1/3 innings pitched.

In a 2019 interview, Wood described his recovery. "Originally, the kneecap was wired together to hold it in place. I didn't have a cast. The doctors felt this way it would heal quicker, and maybe I could be out there in September. That September, I was working out at home trying to get ready to come back when I slipped on the grass and the kneecap went out again. This time, they had to put some pins in it to hold it together and I had a cast on, so I was done for the season." Because his contract ran through 1977, he had a guaranteed opportunity to come back.

However, he struggled upon his return. "I was a little gun-shy," he said of his 1977 season. "I didn't want the ball coming back over the middle again." He made his return in Chicago's 18th game of the year on April 30, allowing five runs (four earned, two home runs) in the final two innings of a 14–4 loss to the Texas Rangers. After Ken Brett was traded to the Angels in mid-June, Wood was added to the rotation on June 19, despite the fact that his ERA was 8.78 in six games (one start). He threw eight innings in the first game of a doubleheader, allowing one unearned run and earning the victory in a 2–1 triumph. In the first game of a doubleheader against the Twins on July 3, he pitched a three-hit shutout. Used on two days' rest on July 6, he held the Seattle Mariners to two runs in a complete game, 4–2 victory. That game, however, marked the final time Wood would pitch on two days' rest in his career. His ERA had fallen to 3.97 at the end of July, but Wood had a 7.02 ERA for the rest of the year. He failed to pitch more than seven innings in August, with the exception of an August 19 game against the Brewers, in which he held the team to five hits and struck out five in a complete game, 3–1 victory. On September 10, Wood tied a major league record by hitting three consecutive batters in the first inning of a game against the Angels, the latter of which forced in a run with the bases loaded. He allowed five runs in 1 1/3 innings, absorbing the loss. Though the White Sox had 22 games left to play in the season, they did not use Wood in any of them. In 24 games (18 starts), he had a 7–8 record, a 4.99 ERA, 42 strikeouts, 50 walks, 10 hit batters (a career high), and 139 hits allowed in 122 2/3 innings pitched.

Wood had a 5–5 record through June 4, 1978, but he won his next five decisions to raise his record to 10–5, despite posting a 4.42 ERA over that span. On June 8, he allowed one run and struck out five in 7 2/3 innings to earn the victory in a 2–1 win over the Twins. He threw a complete game on July 13, allowing just one run in a 6–1 victory over the Yankees. However, from July 18 through August 10, he lost five consecutive decisions, posting a 9.51 ERA. After his August 10 start, Wood was removed from the starting rotation in favor of prospect Ross Baumgarten, making his major league debut. Wood made just one further appearance all season, pitching two scoreless innings to finish a 6–3 loss to the Royals on August 22. Placed on waivers in late August, Wood was claimed by Pittsburgh and Milwaukee, the latter of which worked out a trade for him. However, Wood vetoed the deal, wanting to test free agency instead. In 28 games (27 starts), he had a 10–10 record, a 5.20 ERA, 69 strikeouts, 74 walks, and 187 hits allowed in 168 innings pitched.

After the 1978 season, he became a free agent but attracted "curiously little commotion in the marketplace," which the New York Times News Service speculated might have been due to collusion between the owners. Wood's 5.20 ERA had been the worst among pitchers who threw enough innings to qualify for the AL ERA title in 1978. When he went unselected in a February 1979 draft for unsigned free agents, he decided to retire. "I just couldn't do what I could do before I got hurt. That took the fun out of it," he explained. Of his time with the White Sox, Wood said, "Those are the years that I had the most fun and that I'll remember."

== Career statistics ==
In a 17-year major league career, Wood compiled a 164–156 record with a 3.24 ERA in 661 games. He had 1,411 strikeouts in 2,684 innings pitched, completing 114 games (24 of which were shutouts) of his 297 games started. Wood started 70 games on two days' rest, the highest total since 1914 with the exception of Grover Cleveland Alexander, who did so 72 times in that period.

At the plate, Wood posted a .084 batting average (27 hits in 322 at bats) with only two extra-base hits (both doubles) and just 13 RBI. As a fielder, he recorded a .977 fielding percentage.

First eligible for the Hall of Fame in 1984, Wood received votes for six years. His best year was 1988, when he garnered seven percent of the vote. After receiving just 3.1% of the vote in 1989, he became ineligible to appear on further ballots, as players must receive at least five percent each year to remain potential selections.

== Pitching style ==
In the prime of his career, Wood would throw his 60 to 70 mph knuckleball about 80 percent of the time. Multiple observers called the pitch "tantalizing." It was slower than Wilhelm's or Phil Niekro's, but Wood's tricky delivery compensated for the diminished speed. He continued to use his fastball as well; though he did not have much velocity on it, the pitch would deceive hitters because it traveled straight, unlike the knuckleball. On the knuckleball's unpredictability, Wood said, "We just aim it for the middle of the plate and hope like hell it goes somewhere before it gets there." His ability to keep the pitch in the strike zone set him apart from other knuckleball pitchers. "I'm nervous every time I go out there," Wood explained how he felt on the mound. "It's a thrill – and a challenge. If you are not exciting when you come in, you're lost. But I don't lose my concentration because of a hit or a wild pitch." Pitching coach Johnny Sain said, "Wilbur has tremendous poise. He has the perfect temperament [and] never gets rattled."

"The release, you see, is everything," Wood said as he described how to throw the knuckleball. "You must try to release each pitch the same way. It's a very fine point, but you have to find the spot to let it go. You throw it just like a fastball, only at three-quarter speed. There should be no strain on the shoulder and the elbow. Ideally, there should be no wrist break. This means the ball will not rotate. A really good pitch makes no more than 1½ revolutions. The wind will affect the ball when it is not rotating, causing it to change directions. You will get more break if the wind is blowing in your face, but if it is blowing behind you, your control will be better." He thinks the reason more pitchers do not throw the knuckleball is because it takes several years to get used to.

Hall of Famer Rick Ferrell caught four knuckleballers with the Senators in the 1940s. "I have seen most of the great knuckleballers," he said in 1973, "but it is hard to say that anyone has ever been better than Wood, regardless of time or whatever." "I guess they always said, 'Poor Wilbur, he just doesn't have enough natural ability to pitch in the big leagues. What they call natural ability is standing six-four and being able to throw a ball 100 miles per hour. Well, it turns out that he has as much God-given ability as any man I've ever met. He can throw the knuckleball [and] it requires [a] natural feel," said Sain. "I tell you the sensation I get," Gene Tenace of the Athletics said in describing an at bat against Wood. "I see the ball floating up and then I swing. I get a feeling that the bat has made a ripple in the air and has caused the ball to wriggle like a roundworm." Mike Epstein of the Angels said, "...feeling fully prepared, we go out there and face the thing Wood throws. It looks like a batting practice pitch—soft, tempting. Like the one he struck me out with today, it breaks three or four directions. I didn't know where it was headed. The catcher, I'm sure, didn't know where it was headed. And I'm pretty certain not even Wood knew where it was headed." Paul Blair of the Orioles said, "Obviously, the knuckleball makes Wilbur effective, but what makes him even more effective is the fact that he throws it over for strikes. It never goes the same way, but it is always in the strike zone."

Catchers often struggle with the unpredictable knuckleball. However, since Wilhelm was pitching for the Sox when Wood joined them, Duane Josephson and Jerry McNertney were already used to the pitch. By the time Wood became a starter, Herrmann was Chicago's starting catcher. Herrmann would wear a 38-inch mitt, the largest permitted. Though he led the league in passed balls four times, Herrmann never had a lower fielding percentage than .983 while with the White Sox.

== Highlights ==
- 3-time All-Star (1971, '72, '74)
- AL The Sporting News Fireman of the Year Award winner in 1968
- AL The Sporting News Pitcher of the Year Award winner in 1972
- Led the AL in wins twice (1972, '73)
- Led the AL in games started four times (1972, '73, '74, '75), with his career high coming in 1972 (49)
- 2nd in the AL in shutouts twice (1971, '72), tied with Mel Stottlemyre in 1971
- 2nd in AL Cy Young Award voting (1972)
- Set a single-season record for games pitched in 1968 (88, including 2 starts), broken by Wayne Granger in 1969

== Personal life and death ==
On November 6, 1963, Wood married Sandra Malcolm, in whom he had been interested since high school. Wendy, Derron, and Christen were their three children. Athleticism ran in the family, as Wendy received top ranking in the 18s category for the New England Lawn Tennis Association in 1981. Though he last pitched for the Red Sox in 1964, Wood continued to make his home in the Boston area, working in the food industry during the offseason. Following his career, he purchased Meister's Seafood, a fish market in Belmont that he operated for five years before selling the business. Then, he worked for Carolina Medical as a pharmaceutical salesman and account manager in the Boston region. "Being a ballplayer or being a salesperson, you have to sell yourself," he said.

Fishing was a hobby of Wood's. He would often go out and catch snook during Chicago's spring training in Sarasota. Wood also gardened and cooked and continued to follow baseball, though not as much as he did while still playing. After Wood's 300+ inning seasons, he was not a fan of the later-inning relief pitchers that were becoming so prevalent in baseball by 2001. He was good friends with Jim Price, his catcher at Columbus in 1966.

During his career, Wood stood 6 feet (1.8 m) tall and was listed at 180 pounds (82 kg). Edgar Munzel of The Sporting News offered the following description: "There isn't anyone in the major leagues ... who looks less like a ballplayer. He's a chubby, pot-bellied guy with thinning blond hair, blue eyes, and a pleasant round face." Soft-spoken with a distinct Boston accent, he had a sense of humor he would display around teammates.

Wood died on January 17, 2026 at a hospital in Burlington, Massachusetts, at the age of 84.

== See also ==
- List of knuckleball pitchers
- List of Major League Baseball annual wins leaders
- Major League Baseball titles leaders
