= 1969 Kansas City Royals season =

1969 Kansas City Royals
- League: American League
- Division: West
- Ballpark: Municipal Stadium
- City: Kansas City, Missouri
- Record: 69–93–1 (.426)
- Divisional place: 4th
- Owners: Ewing Kauffman
- General managers: Cedric Tallis
- Managers: Joe Gordon
- Television: KMBC-TV
- Radio: KMBZ (Buddy Blattner, Denny Matthews)

The 1969 Kansas City Royals season was the Royals' inaugural season. The team finished fourth in the newly established American League West with a record of 69 wins, 93 losses, and 1 tie.

== Offseason ==
=== A franchise is born ===
The club's inception is connected to the Athletics franchise. On October 18, 1967, A.L. owners at last gave Charles O. Finley permission to move the Athletics to Oakland for the 1968 season. According to some reports, Joe Cronin promised Finley that he could move the team after the 1967 season as an incentive to sign the new lease with Municipal Stadium. The move came in spite of approval by voters in Jackson County of a bond issue for a brand new baseball stadium (the eventual Kauffman Stadium) to be completed in 1973. When U.S. Senator Stuart Symington threatened to have baseball's antitrust exemption revoked, the owners responded with a hasty round of expansion. Kansas City was awarded an American League expansion team, the Royals. They were initially slated to begin play in 1971. However, Symington was not willing to have Kansas City wait three years for another team, and renewed his threat to have baseball's antitrust exemption revoked unless the teams began play in 1969. The owners complied, but it forced the Seattle Pilots to enter the league earlier than expected without a suitable stadium, leading to financial difficulty, and a rapid relocation to Milwaukee in April 1970.

The Kansas City franchise was formally awarded to Ewing Kauffman on January 11, 1968. The owner selected Los Angeles Angels vice president Cedric Tallis as the Royals' first general manager, and Tallis began to assemble a front office staff.

=== Expansion draft ===
The 1968 Major League Baseball expansion draft for the Royals and the Seattle Pilots was held on October 15.

| Player | Former Team | Pick | Notes |
|---|---|---|---|
| Roger Nelson | Baltimore Orioles | 1st | |
| Joe Foy | Boston Red Sox | 4th | |
| Jim Rooker | New York Yankees | 6th | |
| Joe Keough | Oakland A's | 8th | |
| Steve Jones | Washington Senators | 10th | |
| Jon Warden | Detroit Tigers | 12th | Never played for the Royals. Only major league experience was in 1968. |
| Ellie Rodríguez | New York Yankees | 13th | |
| Dave Morehead | Boston Red Sox | 15th | |
| Mike Fiore | Baltimore Orioles | 17th | |
| Bob Oliver | Minnesota Twins | 19th | |
| Bill Butler | Detroit Tigers | 22nd | |
| Steve Whitaker | New York Yankees | 23rd | Never played for the Royals. Shortly before the season began, traded with John Gelnar to the Seattle Pilots for Lou Piniella. |
| Wally Bunker | Baltimore Orioles | 25th | |
| Paul Schaal | California Angels | 27th | |
| Dan Haynes | Chicago White Sox | 29th | Never played in the major leagues. |
| Dick Drago | Detroit Tigers | 31st | |
| Pat Kelly | Minnesota Twins | 34th | |
| Billy Harris | Cleveland Indians | 36th | |
| Don O'Riley | Oakland A's | 38th | |
| Al Fitzmorris | Chicago White Sox | 40th | |
| Moe Drabowsky | Baltimore Orioles | 42nd | |
| Jackie Hernández | Minnesota Twins | 43rd | |
| Mike Hedlund | Cleveland Indians | 45th | |
| Tom Burgmeier | California Angels | 47th | |
| Hoyt Wilhelm | Chicago White Sox | 49th | Never played for the Royals. Traded before the season began to the California Angels for Ed Kirkpatrick and Dennis Paepke. |
| Jerry Adair | Boston Red Sox | 51st | |
| Jerry Cram | Minnesota Twins | 54th | |
| Fran Healy | Cleveland Indians | 56th | |
| Scott Northey | Chicago White Sox | 58th | |
| Ike Brookens | Washington Senators | 60th | Never played for the Royals. Only major league experience was with the 1975 Detroit Tigers. |

=== Other offseason transactions ===
- June 7, 1968: Dane Iorg was drafted by the Royals in the 16th round of the 1968 Major League Baseball draft, but did not sign.
- August 14, 1968: Galen Cisco was purchased by the Royals from the Boston Red Sox.
- October 16, 1968: Purchased John Gelnar from the Pittsburgh Pirates.
- December 12, 1968: Hoyt Wilhelm was traded by the Royals to the California Angels for Ed Kirkpatrick and Dennis Paepke.
- December 15, 1968: Dennis Ribant was purchased by the Royals from the Detroit Tigers.
- March 29, 1969: Dennis Ribant was purchased from the Royals by the St. Louis Cardinals.

=== 1968 MLB June amateur draft and minor league affiliates ===
The Royals and Seattle Pilots, along with the two National League expansion teams set to debut in 1969, the Montreal Expos and San Diego Padres, were allowed to participate in the June 1968 MLB first-year player draft, although the new teams were barred from the lottery's first three rounds. Despite this impediment, the Royals drafted fifty players in the 1968 June draft, including Iorg and other future major leaguers Lance Clemons (seventh round), Monty Montgomery (ninth) and Paul Splittorff (25th). Splittorff would win 166 games for the MLB Royals, including seasons of 20 (1973) and 19 (1978) victories, in a 15-year big-league career, then become a longtime analyst on the team's television crew. The Royals affiliated with three minor league clubs during 1968 to develop drafted players; the rosters were filled out by professional and amateur free agents that had been signed and players loaned from other organizations.

==== 1968 farm system ====
| Level | Team | League | Manager |
|---|---|---|---|
| A | High Point-Thomasville Hi-Toms | Carolina League | Jack McKeon |
| A | Dubuque Royals | Midwest League | Max Lanier and Paul Pettit |
| A-Short Season | Corning Royals | New York–Penn League | Bobo Osborne |

LEAGUE CHAMPIONS: High Point-Thomasville

== Regular season ==
- May 4, 1969: Bob Oliver became the first Royal to collect six hits in a nine-inning game.

=== Season standings ===
AL West
| Team | W | L | Pct. | GB | Home | Road |
|---|---|---|---|---|---|---|
| Minnesota Twins | 97 | 65 | .599 | — | 57‍–‍24 | 40‍–‍41 |
| Oakland Athletics | 88 | 74 | .543 | 9 | 49‍–‍32 | 39‍–‍42 |
| California Angels | 71 | 91 | .438 | 26 | 43‍–‍38 | 28‍–‍53 |
| Kansas City Royals | 69 | 93 | .426 | 28 | 36‍–‍45 | 33‍–‍48 |
| Chicago White Sox | 68 | 94 | .420 | 29 | 41‍–‍40 | 27‍–‍54 |
| Seattle Pilots | 64 | 98 | .395 | 33 | 34‍–‍47 | 30‍–‍51 |

=== Record vs. opponents ===
1969 American League records Sources:
| Team | BAL | BOS | CAL | CWS | CLE | DET | KC | MIN | NYY | OAK | SEA | WAS |
|---|---|---|---|---|---|---|---|---|---|---|---|---|
| Baltimore | — | 10–8 | 6–6 | 9–3 | 13–5 | 11–7 | 11–1 | 8–4 | 11–7 | 8–4 | 9–3 | 13–5 |
| Boston | 8–10 | — | 8–4 | 5–7 | 12–6 | 10–8 | 10–2 | 7–5 | 11–7 | 4–8 | 6–6 | 6–12 |
| California | 6–6 | 4–8 | — | 9–9 | 8–4 | 5–7 | 9–9 | 7–11 | 3–9 | 6–12 | 9–9–1 | 5–7 |
| Chicago | 3–9 | 7–5 | 9–9 | — | 8–4 | 3–9 | 8–10 | 5–13 | 3–9 | 8–10 | 10–8 | 4–8 |
| Cleveland | 5–13 | 6–12 | 4–8 | 4–8 | — | 7–11 | 7–5 | 5–7 | 9–8 | 5–7 | 7–5 | 3–15 |
| Detroit | 7–11 | 8–10 | 7–5 | 9–3 | 11–7 | — | 8–4 | 6–6 | 10–8 | 7–5 | 10–2 | 7–11 |
| Kansas City | 1–11 | 2–10 | 9–9 | 10–8 | 5–7 | 4–8 | — | 8–10 | 5–7–1 | 8–10 | 10–8 | 7–5 |
| Minnesota | 4–8 | 5–7 | 11–7 | 13–5 | 7–5 | 6–6 | 10–8 | — | 10–2 | 13–5 | 12–6 | 6–6 |
| New York | 7–11 | 7–11 | 9–3 | 9–3 | 8–9 | 8–10 | 7–5–1 | 2–10 | — | 6–6 | 7–5 | 10–8 |
| Oakland | 4–8 | 8–4 | 12–6 | 10–8 | 7–5 | 5–7 | 10–8 | 5–13 | 6–6 | — | 13–5 | 8–4 |
| Seattle | 3–9 | 6–6 | 9–9–1 | 8–10 | 5–7 | 2–10 | 8–10 | 6–12 | 5–7 | 5–13 | — | 7–5 |
| Washington | 5–13 | 12–6 | 7–5 | 8–4 | 15–3 | 11–7 | 5–7 | 6–6 | 8–10 | 4–8 | 5–7 | — |

=== Notable transactions ===
- April 1, 1969: Steve Whitaker and John Gelnar were traded by the Royals to the Seattle Pilots for Lou Piniella.
- June 5, 1969: 1969 Major League Baseball draft
  - Keith Marshall was drafted by the Royals in the 5th round.
  - Frank Ortenzio was drafted by the Royals in the 47th round.

=== The first game ===
==== Starting lineup ====
| 9 | Lou Piniella | CF |
| 14 | Jerry Adair | 2B |
| 8 | Ed Kirkpatrick | LF |
| 1 | Joe Foy | 3B |
| 7 | Chuck Harrison | 1B |
| 33 | Bob Oliver | RF |
| 11 | Ellie Rodríguez | C |
| 24 | Jackie Hernández | SS |
| 27 | Wally Bunker | P |

==== Scorecard ====
April 8, Municipal Stadium, Kansas City, Missouri

| Team | 1 | 2 | 3 | 4 | 5 | 6 | 7 | 8 | 9 | 10 | 11 | 12 | R | H | E |
|---|---|---|---|---|---|---|---|---|---|---|---|---|---|---|---|
| Minnesota | 0 | 1 | 0 | 0 | 0 | 2 | 0 | 0 | 0 | 0 | 0 | 0 | 3 | 12 | 1 |
| Kansas City | 1 | 0 | 0 | 0 | 0 | 2 | 0 | 0 | 0 | 0 | 0 | 1 | 4 | 14 | 0 |
W: Drabowsky (1–0) L: Grzenda (0–1)
HRs: Nettles (1)

=== Roster ===
1969 Kansas City Royals
Roster
| Pitchers: 27 Wally Bunker; 34 Tom Burgmeier; 29 Bill Butler; 26 Galen Cisco; 38 Jerry Cram; 25 Moe Drabowsky; 41 Dick Drago; 42 Al Fitzmorris; 32 Mike Hedlund; 37 Steve Jones; 17 Dave Morehead; 35 Roger Nelson; 23 Don O'Riley; 13,22 Jim Rooker; 40 Dave Wickersham; 40 Chris Zachary | Catchers: 20 Jim Campanis; 16 Fran Healy; 21 Buck Martinez; 28 Dennis Paepke; 11 Ellie Rodríguez; Infielders: 14 Jerry Adair; 39 Luis Alcaraz; 19 Mike Fiore; 1 Joe Foy; 15 Billy Harris; 7 Chuck Harrison; 24 Jackie Hernández; 12 Juan Ríos; 10 Paul Schaal | Outfielders: 18 Pat Kelly; 16 Joe Keough; 8 Ed Kirkpatrick; 44 Scott Northey; 33 Bob Oliver; 9 Lou Piniella; 46 Fred Rico; 30 George Spriggs; 31 Hawk Taylor | Manager: 6 Joe Gordon; Coaches: 4 Harry Dunlop (3rd base); 5 Owen Friend (assistant); 3 Mel Harder (pitching); 36 Charlie Metro (1st base); 2 Jo-Jo White (hitting) |

== Player stats ==
| = Indicates team leader |

=== Batting ===
==== Starters by position ====
Note: Pos = Position; G = Games played; AB = At bats; H = Hits; Avg. = Batting average; HR = Home runs; RBI = Runs batted in

| Pos | Player | G | AB | H | Avg. | HR | RBI |
|---|---|---|---|---|---|---|---|
| C | Ellie Rodríguez | 95 | 267 | 63 | .236 | 2 | 20 |
| 1B | Mike Fiore | 107 | 339 | 93 | .274 | 12 | 35 |
| 2B | Jerry Adair | 126 | 432 | 108 | .250 | 5 | 48 |
| 3B | Joe Foy | 145 | 519 | 136 | .262 | 11 | 71 |
| SS | Jackie Hernández | 145 | 504 | 112 | .222 | 4 | 40 |
| LF | Lou Piniella | 135 | 493 | 139 | .282 | 11 | 68 |
| CF | Bob Oliver | 118 | 394 | 100 | .254 | 13 | 43 |
| RF | Pat Kelly | 112 | 417 | 110 | .264 | 8 | 32 |

==== Other batters ====
Note: G = Games played; AB = At bats; H = Hits; Avg. = Batting average; HR = Home runs; RBI = Runs batted in

| Player | G | AB | H | Avg. | HR | RBI |
|---|---|---|---|---|---|---|
| Ed Kirkpatrick | 120 | 315 | 81 | .257 | 14 | 49 |
| Chuck Harrison | 75 | 213 | 47 | .221 | 3 | 18 |
| Buck Martinez | 72 | 205 | 47 | .229 | 4 | 23 |
| Paul Schaal | 61 | 205 | 54 | .263 | 1 | 13 |
| Juan Ríos | 87 | 196 | 44 | .224 | 1 | 5 |
| Joe Keough | 70 | 166 | 31 | .187 | 0 | 7 |
| Hawk Taylor | 64 | 89 | 24 | .270 | 3 | 21 |
| Jim Campanis | 30 | 83 | 13 | .157 | 0 | 5 |
| Luis Alcaraz | 22 | 79 | 20 | .253 | 1 | 7 |
| Scott Northey | 20 | 61 | 16 | .262 | 1 | 7 |
| George Spriggs | 23 | 29 | 4 | .138 | 0 | 0 |
| Dennis Paepke | 12 | 27 | 3 | .111 | 0 | 0 |
| Fred Rico | 12 | 26 | 6 | .231 | 0 | 2 |
| Fran Healy | 6 | 10 | 4 | .400 | 0 | 0 |
| Billy Harris | 5 | 7 | 2 | .286 | 0 | 0 |

=== Pitching ===
==== Starting pitchers ====
Note: G = Games pitched; IP = Innings pitched; W = Wins; L = Losses; ERA = Earned run average; SO = Strikeouts

| Player | G | IP | W | L | ERA | SO |
|---|---|---|---|---|---|---|
| Wally Bunker | 35 | 222.2 | 12 | 11 | 3.23 | 130 |
| Bill Butler | 34 | 193.2 | 9 | 10 | 3.90 | 156 |
| Roger Nelson | 29 | 193.1 | 7 | 13 | 3.31 | 82 |
| Jim Rooker | 28 | 158.1 | 4 | 16 | 3.75 | 108 |

==== Other pitchers ====
Note: G = Games pitched; IP = Innings pitched; W = Wins; L = Losses; ERA = Earned run average; SO = Strikeouts

| Player | G | IP | W | L | ERA | SO |
|---|---|---|---|---|---|---|
| Dick Drago | 41 | 200.2 | 11 | 13 | 3.77 | 108 |
| Mike Hedlund | 34 | 125.0 | 3 | 6 | 3.24 | 74 |
| Steve Jones | 20 | 44.2 | 2 | 3 | 4.23 | 31 |
| Chris Zachary | 8 | 18.1 | 0 | 1 | 7.85 | 6 |
| Jerry Cram | 5 | 16.2 | 0 | 1 | 3.24 | 10 |

==== Relief pitchers ====
Note: G = Games pitched; W = Wins; L = Losses; SV = Saves; ERA = Earned run average; SO = Strikeouts

| Player | G | W | L | SV | ERA | SO |
|---|---|---|---|---|---|---|
| Moe Drabowsky | 52 | 11 | 9 | 11 | 2.94 | 76 |
| Dave Wickersham | 34 | 2 | 3 | 5 | 3.96 | 27 |
| Tom Burgmeier | 31 | 3 | 1 | 0 | 4.17 | 23 |
| Dave Morehead | 21 | 2 | 3 | 0 | 5.73 | 32 |
| Don O'Riley | 18 | 1 | 1 | 1 | 6.94 | 10 |
| Galen Cisco | 15 | 1 | 1 | 1 | 3.63 | 18 |
| Al Fitzmorris | 7 | 1 | 1 | 2 | 4.22 | 3 |

== Farm system ==
| Level | Team | League | Manager |
|---|---|---|---|
| AAA | Omaha Royals | American Association | Jack McKeon |
| AA | Elmira Pioneers | Eastern League | Harry Bright |
| A | High Point-Thomasville Royals | Carolina League | Harry Malmberg |
| A | Waterloo Hawks | Midwest League | Rollie Hemsley |
| A-Short Season | Corning Royals | New York–Penn League | Buddy Peterson |
| A-Short Season | Winnipeg Goldeyes | Northern League | Spider Jorgensen |
| Rookie | Kingsport Royals | Appalachian League | Red Norwood |

LEAGUE CHAMPIONS: Omaha

Elmira affiliation shared with San Diego Padres

== Awards and honors ==
1969 Major League Baseball All-Star Game

- Ellie Rodríguez (reserve, did not play)

1969 AL Rookie of the Year

- Lou Piniella
