= 1971 Kansas City Royals season =

1971 Kansas City Royals
- League: American League
- Division: West
- Ballpark: Municipal Stadium
- City: Kansas City, Missouri
- Record: 85–76 (.528)
- Divisional place: 2nd
- Owners: Ewing Kauffman
- General managers: Cedric Tallis
- Managers: Bob Lemon (first full season)
- Television: KMBC-TV
- Radio: KMBZ (Buddy Blattner, Denny Matthews)

The 1971 season was the Kansas City Royals' third in Major League Baseball. The Royals had the first winning season (85–76) in franchise history, good enough for second place in the American League West and 16 games behind the Oakland Athletics. Kansas City earning a winning record in its third season was the second fastest of any expansion club in Major League Baseball history up to that point, the 1962 Los Angeles Angels achieved a winning record in their second season. The record would stand until the 1999 Arizona Diamondbacks won the National League West title in their second season.

By comparison, none of the Royals' expansion brethren--the Milwaukee Brewers, Montreal Expos and San Diego Padres--enjoyed a winning season prior to 1978.

== Offseason ==
- February 2, 1971: Ellie Rodríguez was traded by the Royals to the Milwaukee Brewers for Carl Taylor.
- Prior to 1971 season: Gary Lance was signed as an amateur free agent by the Royals.

== Regular season ==
=== Season standings ===
AL West
Team	W	L	Pct.	GB	Home	Road
Oakland Athletics	101	60	.627	—	46‍–‍35	55‍–‍25
Kansas City Royals	85	76	.528	16	44‍–‍37	41‍–‍39
Chicago White Sox	79	83	.488	22½	39‍–‍42	40‍–‍41
California Angels	76	86	.469	25½	35‍–‍46	41‍–‍40
Minnesota Twins	74	86	.463	26½	37‍–‍42	37‍–‍44
Milwaukee Brewers	69	92	.429	32	34‍–‍48	35‍–‍44

=== Record vs. opponents ===
1971 American League record Sources:
Team	BAL	BOS	CAL	CWS	CLE	DET	KC	MIL	MIN	NYY	OAK	WAS
Baltimore	—	9–9	7–5	8–4	13–5	8–10	6–5	9–3	10–2	11–7	7–4	13–3
Boston	9–9	—	6–6	10–2	11–7	12–6	1–11	6–6	8–4	7–11	3–9	12–6
California	5–7	6–6	—	8–10	8–4	6–6	8–10	6–12	12–6	6–6	7–11	4–8
Chicago	4–8	2–10	10–8	—	3–9	7–5	9–9	11–7	7–11	5–7	11–7	10–2
Cleveland	5–13	7–11	4–8	9–3	—	6–12	2–10	4–8	4–8	8–10	4–8	7–11
Detroit	10–8	6–12	6–6	5–7	12–6	—	8–4	10–2	6–6	10–8	4–8	14–4
Kansas City	5–6	11–1	10–8	9–9	10–2	4–8	—	8–10	9–9	5–7	5–13	9–3
Milwaukee	3–9	6–6	12–6	7–11	8–4	2–10	10–8	—	10–7	2–10	3–15	6–6
Minnesota	2–10	4–8	6–12	11–7	8–4	6–6	9–9	7–10	—	8–4	8–10	5–6
New York	7–11	11–7	6–6	7–5	10–8	8–10	7–5	10–2	4–8	—	5–7	7–11
Oakland	4–7	9–3	11–7	7–11	8–4	8–4	13–5	15–3	10–8	7–5	—	9–3
Washington	3–13	6–12	8–4	2–10	11–7	4–14	3–9	6–6	6–5	11–7	3–9	—

=== Notable transactions ===
- May 11, 1971: Tom Matchick was traded by the Royals to the Milwaukee Brewers for Ted Savage.
- June 8, 1971: George Brett was drafted by the Royals in the 2nd round of the 1971 Major League Baseball draft.

=== Roster ===
1971 Kansas City Royals
Roster
Pitchers: 36 Ted Abernathy; 27 Wally Bunker; 29 Bill Butler; 22 Tom Burgmeier; 27 Lance Clemons; 43 Bruce Dal Canton; 41 Dick Drago; 23 Al Fitzmorris; 32 Mike Hedlund; 25 Mike McCormick; 20 Monty Montgomery; 35 Roger Nelson; 14 Jim Rooker; 25 Paul Splittorff; 28 Ken Wright; 40 Jim York	Catchers: 6 Buck Martinez; 12 Jerry May; 17 Dennis Paepke; Infielders: 15 Bobby Floyd; 7 Chuck Harrison; 18,39 Gail Hopkins; 19 Bobby Knoop; 33 Bob Oliver; 2,37 Freddie Patek; 1 Cookie Rojas; 10 Paul Schaal; 15 Rich Severson	Outfielders: 16 Joe Keough; 8 Ed Kirkpatrick; 26 Amos Otis; 9 Lou Piniella; 5 Ted Savage; 44 Carl Taylor; 49 Sandy Valdespino	Manager: 21 Bob Lemon; Coaches: 3 Galen Cisco (Pitching); 4 Harry Dunlop (Third base); 24 Charley Lau (Hitting); 11 George Strickland (First base)

== Player stats ==
= Indicates team leader

=== Batting ===
==== Starters by position ====
Note: Pos = Position; G = Games played; AB = At bats; H = Hits; Avg. = Batting average; HR = Home runs; RBI = Runs batted in

Pos	Player	G	AB	H	Avg.	HR	RBI
C	Jerry May	71	218	55	.252	1	24
1B	Gail Hopkins	103	295	82	.278	9	47
2B	Cookie Rojas	115	414	124	.300	6	59
SS	Freddie Patek	147	591	158	.267	6	36
3B	Paul Schaal	161	548	150	.274	11	63
LF	Lou Piniella	126	448	125	.279	3	51
CF	Amos Otis	147	555	167	.301	15	79
RF	Joe Keough	110	351	87	.248	3	30

==== Other batters ====
Note: G = Games played; AB = At bats; H = Hits; Avg. = Batting average; HR = Home runs; RBI = Runs batted in

Player	G	AB	H	Avg.	HR	RBI
Bob Oliver	128	373	91	.244	8	52
Ed Kirkpatrick	120	365	80	.219	9	46
Bobby Knoop	72	161	33	.205	1	11
Dennis Paepke	60	152	31	.204	2	14
Chuck Harrison	49	143	31	.217	2	21
Bobby Floyd	31	66	10	.152	0	2
Sandy Valdespino	18	63	20	.317	2	15
Buck Martinez	22	46	7	.152	0	1
Carl Taylor	20	39	7	.179	0	3
Rich Severson	16	30	9	.300	0	1
Ted Savage	19	29	5	.172	0	1

=== Pitching ===
==== Starting pitchers ====
Note: G = Games pitched; IP = Innings pitched; W = Wins; L = Losses; ERA = Earned run average; SO = Strikeouts

Player	G	IP	W	L	ERA	SO
Dick Drago	35	241.1	17	11	2.98	109
Mike Hedlund	32	205.2	15	8	2.71	76
Paul Splittorff	22	144.1	8	9	2.68	80
Bruce Dal Canton	25	141.1	8	6	3.44	58
Wally Bunker	7	32.1	2	3	5.01	15

==== Other pitchers ====
Note: G = Games pitched; IP = Innings pitched; W = Wins; L = Losses; ERA = Earned run average; SO = Strikeouts

Player	G	IP	W	L	ERA	SO
Al Fitzmorris	36	127.1	7	5	4.17	53
Ken Wright	21	78.0	3	6	3.69	56
Jim Rooker	20	54.0	2	7	5.33	31
Bill Butler	14	44.1	1	2	3.45	32
Lance Clemons	10	24.0	1	0	4.12	20
Monty Montgomery	3	21.1	3	0	2.11	12
Mike McCormick	4	9.2	0	0	9.31	2

==== Relief pitchers ====
Note: G = Games pitched; W = Wins; L = Losses; SV = Saves; ERA = Earned run average; SO = Strikeouts

Player	G	W	L	SV	ERA	SO
Ted Abernathy	63	4	6	23	2.56	55
Tom Burgmeier	67	9	7	17	1.73	44
Jim York	53	5	5	3	2.89	103
Roger Nelson	13	0	1	0	5.29	29

== Awards and honors ==
All-Star Game

- Cookie Rojas, Second Base, Reserve
- Amos Otis, Outfield, Reserve

== Farm system ==
Level	Team	League	Manager
AAA	Omaha Royals	American Association	Jack McKeon
AA	Elmira Royals	Eastern League	Harry Malmberg
A	San Jose Bees	California League	Buddy Peterson
A	Waterloo Royals	Midwest League	Steve Boros
Rookie	Kingsport Royals	Appalachian League	Owen Friend
Rookie	GCL Royals	Gulf Coast League	Buzzy Keller
Rookie	Billings Mustangs	Pioneer League	Gary Blaylock

LEAGUE CHAMPIONS: Elmira, GCL Royals
