= 1972 Kansas City Royals season =

1972 Kansas City Royals
- League: American League
- Division: West
- Ballpark: Municipal Stadium
- City: Kansas City, Missouri
- Record: 76–78 (.494)
- Divisional place: 4th
- Owners: Ewing Kauffman
- General managers: Cedric Tallis
- Managers: Bob Lemon
- Television: KBMA
- Radio: KMBZ (Buddy Blattner, Denny Matthews)

The 1972 Kansas City Royals season was their fourth in Major League Baseball. The Royals finished fourth in the American League West at 76–78, 16 1/2 games behind the Oakland Athletics. John Mayberry, in his first season with Kansas City, led the team with 25 home runs and 100 runs batted in. Mayberry was the first Royals player to drive in at least 100 runs in a season.

== Offseason ==
- November 29, 1971: Steve Hovley was drafted by the Royals from the Oakland Athletics in the 1971 rule 5 draft.
- December 2, 1971: Jim York and Lance Clemons were traded by the Royals to the Houston Astros for John Mayberry and Dave Grangaard (minors).
- March 15, 1972: José Martínez was purchased by the Royals from the Pittsburgh Pirates.
- Prior to 1972 season: Mark Williams was signed as an amateur free agent by the Royals.

== Regular season ==
=== Season standings ===
AL West
Team	W	L	Pct.	GB	Home	Road
Oakland Athletics	93	62	.600	—	48‍–‍29	45‍–‍33
Chicago White Sox	87	67	.565	5½	55‍–‍23	32‍–‍44
Minnesota Twins	77	77	.500	15½	42‍–‍32	35‍–‍45
Kansas City Royals	76	78	.494	16½	44‍–‍33	32‍–‍45
California Angels	75	80	.484	18	44‍–‍36	31‍–‍44
Texas Rangers	54	100	.351	38½	31‍–‍46	23‍–‍54

=== Record vs. opponents ===
1972 American League records Sources:
Team	BAL	BOS	CAL	CWS	CLE	DET	KC	MIL	MIN	NYY	OAK	TEX
Baltimore	—	7–11	6–6	8–4	8–10	10–8	6–6	10–5	6–6	7–6	6–6	6–6
Boston	11–7	—	8–4	6–6	8–7	5–9	6–6	11–7	4–8	9–9	9–3	8–4
California	6–6	4–8	—	7–11	8–4	5–7	9–6	7–5	7–8	4–8	8–10	10–7
Chicago	4–8	6–6	11–7	—	8–4	5–7	8–9	9–3	8–6	7–5	7–8	14–4
Cleveland	10–8	7–8	4–8	4–8	—	10–8	6–6	5–10	8–4	7–11	2–10	9–3
Detroit	8–10	9–5	7–5	7–5	8–10	—	7–5	10–8	9–3	7–9	4–8	10–2
Kansas City	6–6	6–6	6–9	9–8	6–6	5–7	—	7–5	9–9	7–5	7–11	8–6
Milwaukee	5–10	7–11	5–7	3–9	10–5	8–10	5–7	—	4–8	9–9	4–8	5–7
Minnesota	6–6	8–4	8–7	6–8	4–8	3–9	9–9	8–4	—	6–6	8–9	11–7
New York	6–7	9–9	8–4	5–7	11–7	9–7	5–7	9–9	6–6	—	3–9	8–4
Oakland	6–6	3–9	10–8	8–7	10–2	8–4	11–7	8–4	9–8	9–3	—	11–4
Texas	6–6	4–8	7–10	4–14	3–9	2–10	6–8	7–5	7–11	4–8	4–11	—

=== Notable transactions ===
- June 6, 1972: 1972 Major League Baseball draft
  - Jamie Quirk was drafted by the Royals in the 1st round (18th pick).
  - George Throop was drafted by the Royals in the 16th round.

=== Roster ===
1972 Kansas City Royals
Roster
Pitchers: 36 Ted Abernathy; 39 Norm Angelini; 22 Tom Burgmeier; 40 Steve Busby; 43 Bruce Dal Canton; 41 Dick Drago; 23 Al Fitzmorris; 32 Mike Hedlund; 25 Mike Jackson; 20 Monty Montgomery; 29 Tom Murphy; 35 Roger Nelson; 25 Jim Rooker; 34 Paul Splittorff; 28 Ken Wright	Catchers: 8 Ed Kirkpatrick; 12 Jerry May; 17 Dennis Paepke; 14 Carl Taylor; Infielders: 15 Bobby Floyd; 2 Ron Hansen; 18 Gail Hopkins; 19 Bobby Knoop; 7 John Mayberry; 37 Freddie Patek; 1 Cookie Rojas; 10 Paul Schaal; 6 Jim Wohlford	Outfielders: 30 Steve Hovley; 16 Joe Keough; 33 Bob Oliver; 26 Amos Otis; 9 Lou Piniella; 5 Richie Scheinblum	Manager: 21 Bob Lemon; Coaches: 3 Galen Cisco (Pitching); 4 Harry Dunlop (Third base); 24 Charley Lau (Hitting); 11 George Strickland (First base)

== Player stats ==
= Indicates team leader

=== Batting ===
==== Starters by position ====
Note: Pos = Position; G = Games played; AB = At bats; H = Hits; Avg. = Batting average; HR = Home runs; RBI = Runs batted in

Pos	Player	G	AB	H	Avg.	HR	RBI
C	Ed Kirkpatrick	113	364	100	.275	9	43
1B	John Mayberry	149	503	150	.298	25	100
2B	Cookie Rojas	137	487	127	.261	3	53
SS	Freddie Patek	136	518	110	.212	0	32
3B	Paul Schaal	127	435	99	.228	6	41
LF	Lou Piniella	151	574	179	.312	11	72
CF	Amos Otis	143	540	158	.293	11	54
RF	Richie Scheinblum	134	450	135	.300	8	66

==== Other batters ====
Note: G = Games played; AB = At bats; H = Hits; Avg. = Batting average; HR = Home runs; RBI = Runs batted in

Player	G	AB	H	Avg.	HR	RBI
Steve Hovley	105	196	53	.270	3	24
Bobby Floyd	61	134	24	.179	0	5
Jerry May	53	116	22	.190	1	4
Carl Taylor	63	113	30	.265	0	11
Bobby Knoop	44	97	23	.237	0	7
Gail Hopkins	53	71	15	.211	0	5
Joe Keough	56	64	14	.219	0	5
Bob Oliver	16	63	17	.270	1	6
Ron Hansen	16	30	4	.133	0	2
Jim Wohlford	15	25	6	.240	0	0
Dennis Paepke	2	6	0	.000	0	0

=== Pitching ===
==== Starting pitchers ====
Note: G = Games pitched; IP = Innings pitched; W = Wins; L = Losses; ERA = Earned run average; SO = Strikeouts

Player	G	IP	W	L	ERA	SO
Dick Drago	34	239.1	12	17	3.01	135
Paul Splittorff	35	216.0	12	12	3.13	140
Monty Montgomery	9	56.1	3	3	3.04	24
Steve Busby	5	40.0	3	1	1.58	31

==== Other pitchers ====
Note: G = Games pitched; IP = Innings pitched; W = Wins; L = Losses; ERA = Earned run average; SO = Strikeouts

Player	G	IP	W	L	ERA	SO
Roger Nelson	34	173.1	11	6	2.08	120
Bruce Dal Canton	35	132.1	6	6	3.40	75
Mike Hedlund	29	113.0	5	7	4.78	52
Jim Rooker	18	72.0	5	6	4.38	44
Tom Murphy	18	70.1	4	4	3.07	34
Mike Jackson	7	19.2	1	2	6.41	15

==== Relief pitchers ====
Note: G = Games pitched; W = Wins; L = Losses; SV = Saves; ERA = Earned run average; SO = Strikeouts

Player	G	W	L	SV	ERA	SO
Tom Burgmeier	51	6	2	9	4.23	18
Ted Abernathy	45	3	4	5	1.70	28
Al Fitzmorris	38	2	5	3	3.74	51
Norm Angelini	21	2	1	2	2.25	16
Ken Wright	17	1	2	4	4.91	18

== Awards and honors ==
All-Star Game

- Cookie Rojas, Second Base, Reserve
- Lou Piniella, Outfield, Reserve
- Richie Scheinblum, Outfield, Reserve

== Farm system ==
Level	Team	League	Manager
AAA	Omaha Royals	American Association	Jack McKeon
AA	Jacksonville Suns	Southern League	Billy Gardner
A	San Jose Bees	California League	Harry Malmberg
A	Waterloo Royals	Midwest League	Steve Boros
Rookie	Kingsport Royals	Appalachian League	Jay Hankins
Rookie	GCL Royals	Gulf Coast League	Buzzy Keller
Rookie	Billings Mustangs	Pioneer League	Gary Blaylock

LEAGUE CHAMPIONS: Billings
