= 1970 Kansas City Royals season =

1970 Kansas City Royals
- League: American League
- Division: West
- Ballpark: Municipal Stadium
- City: Kansas City, Missouri
- Record: 65–97 (.401)
- Divisional place: 4th
- Owners: Ewing Kauffman
- General managers: Cedric Tallis
- Managers: Charlie Metro and Bob Lemon
- Television: KMBC-TV
- Radio: KMBZ (Buddy Blattner, Denny Matthews)

The 1970 Kansas City Royals season was their second in Major League Baseball. The Royals finished tied for fourth place with the Milwaukee Brewers in the American League West with a record of 65–97, 33 games behind the division champion Minnesota Twins. Charlie Metro took over as manager when Joe Gordon resigned after the Royals' initial season, but was replaced by Bob Lemon following a 19–33 start. Bob Oliver hit a team-high 27 home runs, becoming the first Royals player to hit 20 or more home runs in a season.

== Offseason ==
- December 3, 1969: Joe Foy was traded by the Royals to the New York Mets for Amos Otis and Bob Johnson.
- January 17, 1970: Greg Minton was drafted by the Royals in the third round of the 1970 Major League Baseball draft.

== Regular season ==
=== Season standings ===
AL West
Team	W	L	Pct.	GB	Home	Road
Minnesota Twins	98	64	.605	—	51‍–‍30	47‍–‍34
Oakland Athletics	89	73	.549	9	49‍–‍32	40‍–‍41
California Angels	86	76	.531	12	43‍–‍38	43‍–‍38
Kansas City Royals	65	97	.401	33	35‍–‍44	30‍–‍53
Milwaukee Brewers	65	97	.401	33	38‍–‍42	27‍–‍55
Chicago White Sox	56	106	.346	42	31‍–‍53	25‍–‍53

=== Record vs. opponents ===
1970 American League record Sources:
Team	BAL	BOS	CAL	CWS	CLE	DET	KC	MIL	MIN	NYY	OAK	WAS
Baltimore	—	13–5	7–5	9–3	14–4	11–7	12–0	7–5	5–7	11–7	7–5	12–6
Boston	5–13	—	5–7	8–4	12–6	9–9	7–5	5–7	7–5	10–8	7–5	12–6
California	5–7	7–5	—	12–6	6–6	6–6	10–8	12–6	8–10	5–7	8–10	7–5
Chicago	3–9	4–8	6–12	—	6–6	6–6	7–11	7–11	6–12	5–7	2–16	4–8
Cleveland	4–14	6–12	6–6	6–6	—	7–11	8–4	7–5	6–6	8–10	7–5	11–7
Detroit	7–11	9–9	6–6	6–6	11–7	—	6–6	8–4	4–8	7–11	6–6	9–9
Kansas City	0–12	5–7	8–10	11–7	4–8	6–6	—	12–6	5–13	1–11	7–11	6–6
Milwaukee	5–7	7–5	6–12	11–7	5–7	4–8	6–12	—	5–13	3–9–1	8–10	5–7
Minnesota	7–5	5–7	10–8	12–6	6–6	8–4	13–5	13–5	—	5–7	13–5	6–6
New York	7–11	8–10	7–5	7–5	10–8	11–7	11–1	9–3–1	7–5	—	6–6	10–8
Oakland	5–7	5–7	10–8	16–2	5–7	6–6	11–7	10–8	5–13	6–6	—	10–2
Washington	6–12	6–12	5–7	8–4	7–11	9–9	6–6	7–5	6–6	8–10	2–10	—

=== Notable transactions ===
- May 28, 1970: Mike Fiore was traded by the Royals to the Boston Red Sox for Tom Matchick.

=== Roster ===
1970 Kansas City Royals
Roster
Pitchers: 36 Ted Abernathy; 27 Wally Bunker; 22 Tom Burgmeier; 29 Bill Butler; 25 Moe Drabowsky; 41 Dick Drago; 23 Al Fitzmorris; 32 Mike Hedlund; 30 Bob Johnson; 21 Aurelio Monteagudo; 17 Dave Morehead; 35 Roger Nelson; 32 Don O'Riley; 13 Jim Rooker; 43 Paul Splittorff; 28,48 Ken Wright; 40 Jim York	Catchers: 20,25 Jim Campanis; 8 Ed Kirkpatrick; 6 Buck Martinez; 11 Ellie Rodríguez; 31 Hawk Taylor; Infielders: 14 Jerry Adair; 1 Luis Alcaraz; 19 Mike Fiore; 15 Bobby Floyd; 24 Jackie Hernández; 19 Tom Matchick; 33 Bob Oliver; 1 Cookie Rojas; 10 Paul Schaal; 15 Rich Severson; 7 Billy Sorrell	Outfielders: 18 Pat Kelly; 16 Joe Keough; 26 Amos Otis; 9 Lou Piniella; 6,12 George Spriggs	Manager: 2 Bob Lemon; 36 Charlie Metro; Coaches: 5 Dan Carnevale (Bench); 4 Harry Dunlop (First base); 2 Bob Lemon (Pitching); 3 Joe Schultz (Third base); 14 George Strickland

== Player stats ==
=== Batting ===
==== Starters by position ====
Note: Pos = Position; G = Games played; AB = At bats; H = Hits; Avg. = Batting average; HR = Home runs; RBI = Runs batted in

Pos	Player	G	AB	H	Avg.	HR	RBI
C	Ed Kirkpatrick	134	424	97	.229	18	62
1B	Bob Oliver	160	612	159	.260	27	99
2B	Cookie Rojas	98	384	100	.260	2	28
SS	Jackie Hernández	83	238	55	.231	2	10
3B	Paul Schaal	124	380	102	.268	5	35
LF	Lou Piniella	144	542	163	.301	11	88
CF	Amos Otis	159	620	176	.284	11	58
RF	Pat Kelly	136	452	106	.235	6	38

==== Other batters ====
Note: G = Games played; AB = At bats; H = Hits; Avg. = Batting average; HR = Home runs; RBI = Runs batted in

Player	G	AB	H	Avg.	HR	RBI
Rich Severson	77	240	60	.250	1	22
Ellie Rodríguez	80	231	52	.225	1	15
Joe Keough	57	183	59	.322	4	21
Tom Matchick	55	158	31	.196	0	11
Billy Sorrell	57	135	36	.267	4	14
George Spriggs	51	130	27	.208	1	7
Luis Alcaraz	35	120	20	.167	1	14
Mike Fiore	25	72	13	.181	0	4
Hawk Taylor	57	55	9	.164	0	6
Jim Campanis	31	54	7	.130	2	2
Bobby Floyd	14	43	14	.326	0	9
Jerry Adair	7	27	4	.148	0	1
Buck Martinez	6	9	1	.111	0	0

=== Pitching ===
==== Starting pitchers ====
Note: G = Games pitched; IP = Innings pitched; W = Wins; L = Losses; ERA = Earned run average; SO = Strikeouts

Player	G	IP	W	L	ERA	SO
Dick Drago	35	240.0	9	15	3.75	127
Jim Rooker	38	203.2	10	15	3.54	117
Bill Butler	25	140.2	4	12	3.77	75

==== Other pitchers ====
Note: G = Games pitched; IP = Innings pitched; W = Wins; L = Losses; ERA = Earned run average; SO = Strikeouts

Player	G	IP	W	L	ERA	SO
Bob Johnson	40	214.0	8	13	3.07	206
Wally Bunker	24	121.2	2	11	4.22	59
Dave Morehead	28	121.2	3	5	3.62	69
Al Fitzmorris	43	117.2	8	5	4.44	47
Don O'Riley	9	23.1	0	0	5.40	13
Roger Nelson	4	9.0	0	2	10.00	3
Paul Splittorff	2	8.2	0	1	7.27	10

==== Relief pitchers ====
Note: G = Games pitched; W = Wins; L = Losses; SV = Saves; ERA = Earned run average; SO = Strikeouts

Player	G	W	L	SV	ERA	SO
Ted Abernathy	36	9	3	12	2.59	49
Ken Wright	47	1	2	3	5.23	30
Tom Burgmeier	41	6	6	1	3.16	43
Moe Drabowsky	24	1	2	2	3.28	38
Aurelio Monteagudo	21	1	1	0	2.96	18
Mike Hedlund	9	2	3	0	7.20	5
Jim York	4	1	1	0	3.38	6

== Farm system ==
Level	Team	League	Manager
AAA	Omaha Royals	American Association	Jack McKeon
AA	Elmira Pioneers	Eastern League	Harry Malmberg
A	San Jose Bees	California League	Buddy Peterson
A	Waterloo Hawks	Midwest League	Steve Boros
Rookie	Kingsport Royals	Appalachian League	Owen Friend
Rookie	Billings Mustangs	Pioneer League	Dave Pavlesic

LEAGUE CHAMPIONS: Omaha
Elmira affiliation shared with San Diego Padres
