= List of Kansas City Royals Opening Day starting pitchers =

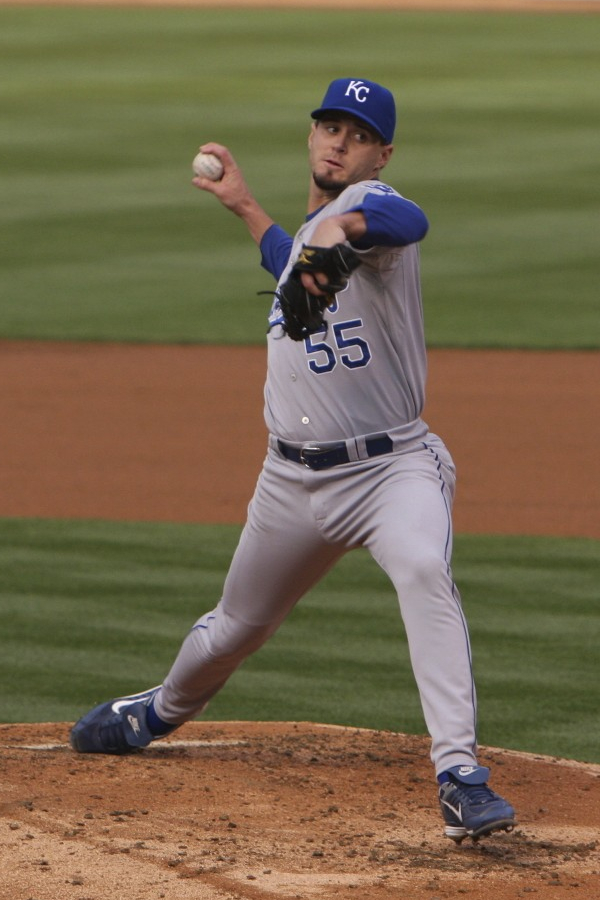
Gil Meche was the Kansas City Royals' Opening Day starting pitcher (2007–2009).

The Kansas City Royals are a Major League Baseball (MLB) team based in Kansas City, Missouri. They currently play in the American League Central.

The first game of a new baseball season for a team is known as Opening Day. The Opening Day starting pitcher is often given to the pitcher who is expected to lead the team's pitching staff for that season, though there are strategic reasons why a team's best pitcher might not start on Opening Day. The Kansas City Royals have used 25 different Opening Day starting pitchers in their 52 seasons. The 23 starters have a combined Opening Day record of 14 wins, 22 losses and 16 no decisions. No decisions are only awarded to the starting pitcher if the game is won or lost after the starting pitcher has left the game.

The Kansas City Royals began play in 1969. Wally Bunker was the Royals’ first Opening Day starting pitcher on April 8, 1969, against the Minnesota Twins. The Royals have played in two home ball parks. They played in Municipal Stadium from 1969 through 1972. They played three Opening Day games at Municipal Stadium, winning twice and losing once. The Royals’ starting pitchers received no decisions in both of the wins, leaving their record in Opening Day starts at Municipal Stadium no wins, one loss, and two no decisions. In 1973, the team moved to Royals Stadium (later renamed to Kauffman Stadium in 1993). They have played 24 Opening Day games in the stadium, with starting pitchers having ten wins, ten losses, and four no decisions. On the other hand, the Royals have played 25 Opening Day games on the road. Starting pitchers have a combined record of four wins, thirteen losses, and eight no decisions for road games.

Kevin Appier has most Opening Day starts for the Royals, with seven, including six consecutive start from 1992 to 1997. He has a record of 1–4 with two no decisions in those starts. The other Royal pitchers who have made at least three Opening Day starts are Dennis Leonard with four, and Paul Splittorff, Bud Black, Bret Saberhagen, Jeff Suppan, Gil Meche, and Danny Duffy with three apiece. Bunker, Dick Drago, Steve Busby, Larry Gura, James Shields, and Cole Ragans have each made two Opening Day starts for the Royals.

Black, who has two wins as an Opening Day starting pitcher, is the only Royals pitcher who has won more than one Opening Day start. Black had a record in Opening Day starts of 2–1. Only two Royals pitchers had more than one loss in Opening Day starts, Kevin Appier with four losses and Dennis Leonard with three.

The Royals played in the World Series in 1980, 1985, 2014 and 2015, winning in 1985 and 2015. Leonard, Black, Shields and Ventura were the Opening Day starting pitchers in 1980, 1985, 2014 and 2015 respectively. They combined to have an Opening Day record of 2–1 with one no decision.

== Key ==
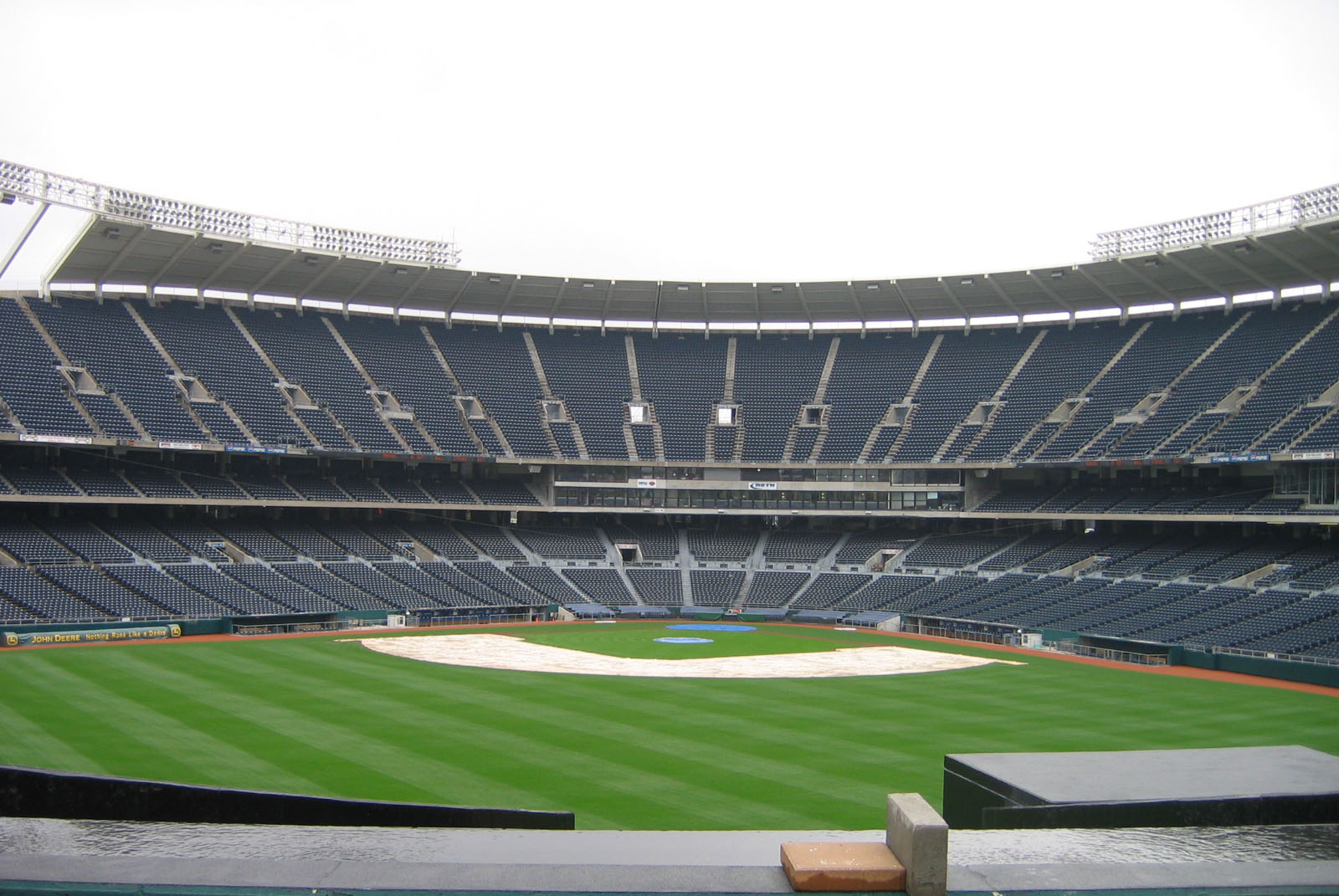
Kauffman Stadium, originally named Royals Stadium, has been the Royals' home ball park since 1973.

Season	Each year is linked to an article about that particular Royals season.
W	Win
L	Loss
ND (W)	No decision by starting pitcher; Royals won game
ND (L)	No decision by starting pitcher; Royals lost game
Final; Score	Game score with Royals runs listed first
Location	Stadium in italics for home game
Pitcher (#)	Number of appearances as Opening Day starter with the Royals
*	Advanced to the post-season
**	AL Champions
†	World Series Champions

== Pitchers ==
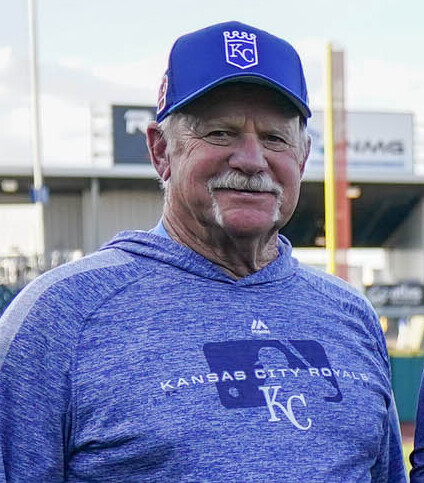
Dennis Leonard was the Royals' Opening Day starting pitcher three times from 1978 to 1980

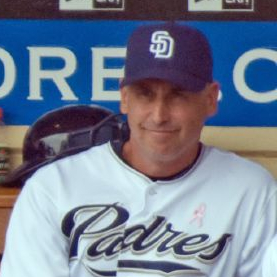
Bud Black (shown here with the San Diego Padres) was the Royals' Opening Day starting pitcher three times from 1984 to 1986

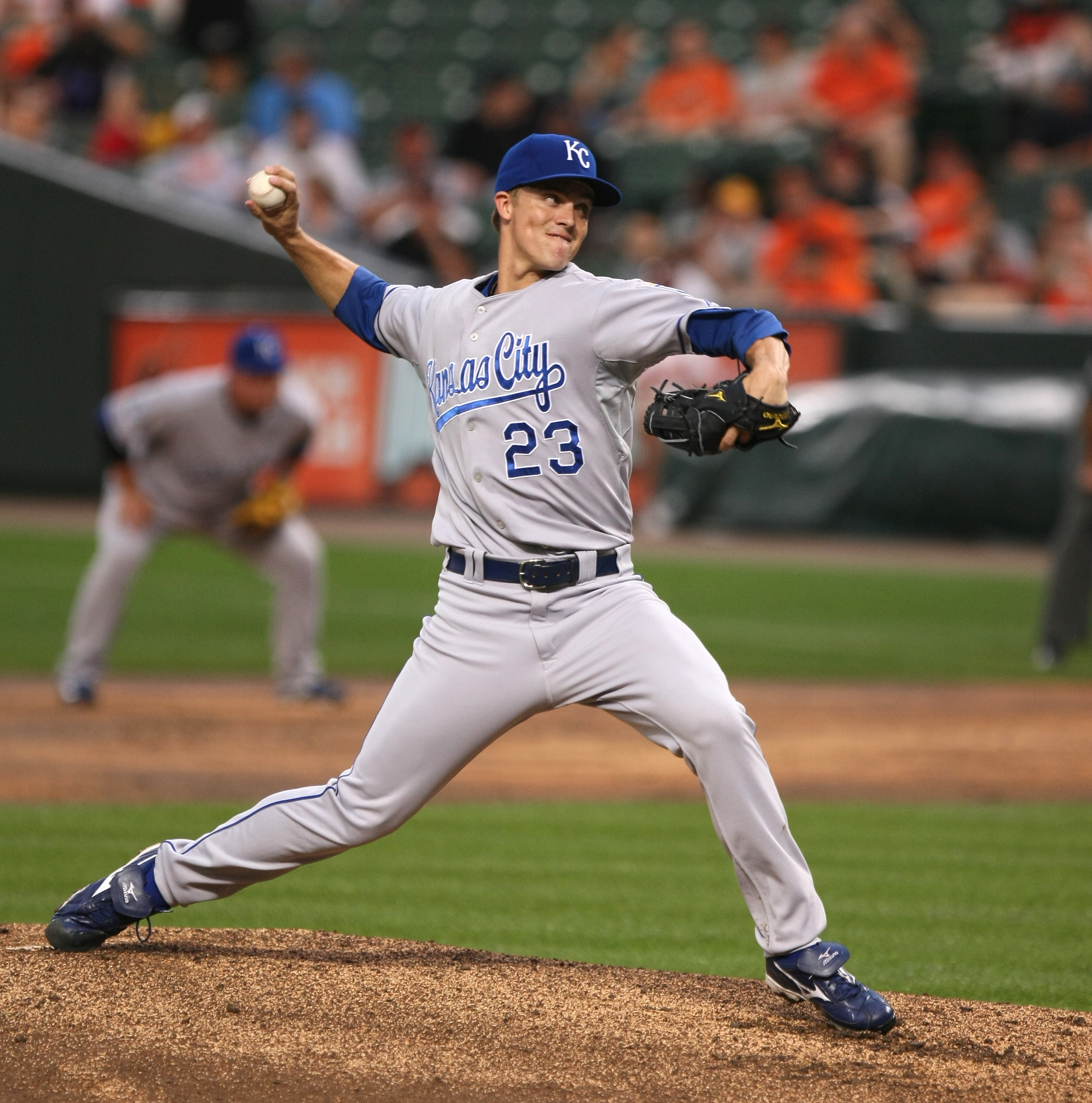
Zack Greinke was the Royals' Opening Day starting pitcher in 2010, 2022 and 2023.

Season	Pitcher	Decision	Final score	Opponent	Location	Ref(s)
1969	Wally Bunker	ND (W)	4–3	Minnesota Twins	Municipal Stadium	
1970	Wally Bunker (2)	L	4–6	Oakland Athletics	Municipal Stadium	
1971	Dick Drago	W	4–1	California Angels	Anaheim Stadium	
1972	Dick Drago (2)	ND (W)	2–1	Chicago White Sox	Municipal Stadium	
1973	Steve Busby	L	2–3	California Angels	Anaheim Stadium	
1974	Paul Splittorff	ND (L)	4–6	Minnesota Twins	Royals Stadium	
1975	Steve Busby (2)	ND (L)	2–3	California Angels	Anaheim Stadium	
1976*	Paul Splittorff (2)	L	0–4	Chicago White Sox	Comiskey Park	
1977*	Paul Splittorff (3)	W	7–4	Detroit Tigers	Tiger Stadium	
1978*	Dennis Leonard	L	5–8	Cleveland Indians	Cleveland Stadium	
1979	Dennis Leonard (2)	W	11–2	Toronto Blue Jays	Royals Stadium	
1980**	Dennis Leonard (3)	L	1–5	Detroit Tigers	Royals Stadium	
1981*	Larry Gura	L	3–5	Baltimore Orioles	Memorial Stadium	
1982	Dennis Leonard (4)	L	5–13	Baltimore Orioles	Memorial Stadium	
1983	Larry Gura (2)	W	7–2	Baltimore Orioles	Memorial Stadium	
1984*	Bud Black	W	4–2	New York Yankees	Royals Stadium	
1985†	Bud Black (2)	W	2–1	Toronto Blue Jays	Royals Stadium	
1986	Bud Black (3)	L	2–4	New York Yankees	Yankee Stadium	
1987	Danny Jackson	L	4–5	Chicago White Sox	Royals Stadium	
1988	Bret Saberhagen	L	3–5	Toronto Blue Jays	Royals Stadium	
1989	Mark Gubicza	L	3–4	Toronto Blue Jays	Royals Stadium	
1990	Bret Saberhagen (2)	ND (L)	6–7	Baltimore Orioles	Royals Stadium	
1991	Bret Saberhagen (3)	W	4–2	Cleveland Indians	Royals Stadium	
1992	Kevin Appier	ND (L)	3–5	Oakland Athletics	Oakland–Alameda County Coliseum	
1993	Kevin Appier (2)	L	1–3	Boston Red Sox	Royals Stadium	
1994	Kevin Appier (3)	L	3–6	Baltimore Orioles	Camden Yards	
1995	Kevin Appier (4)	W	5–1	Baltimore Orioles	Kauffman Stadium	
1996	Kevin Appier (5)	L	2–5	Baltimore Orioles	Camden Yards	
1997	Kevin Appier (6)	ND (L)	2–4	Baltimore Orioles	Camden Yards	
1998	Tim Belcher	W	4–1	Baltimore Orioles	Camden Yards	
1999	Kevin Appier (7)	L	3–5	Boston Red Sox	Kauffman Stadium	
2000	Jeff Suppan	ND (L)	4–5	Toronto Blue Jays	SkyDome	
2001	Jeff Suppan (2)	L	3–7	New York Yankees	Yankee Stadium	
2002	Jeff Suppan (3)	ND (L)	6–8	Minnesota Twins	Kauffman Stadium	
2003	Runelvys Hernández	W	3–0	Chicago White Sox	Kauffman Stadium	
2004	Brian Anderson	ND (W)	9–7	Chicago White Sox	Kauffman Stadium	
2005	José Lima	L	2–11	Detroit Tigers	Comerica Park	
2006	Scott Elarton	L	1–3	Detroit Tigers	Kauffman Stadium	
2007	Gil Meche	W	7–1	Boston Red Sox	Kauffman Stadium	
2008	Gil Meche (2)	ND (W)	5–4	Detroit Tigers	Comerica Park	
2009	Gil Meche (3)	ND (L)	2–4	Chicago White Sox	U.S. Cellular Field	
2010	Zack Greinke	ND (L)	4–8	Detroit Tigers	Kauffman Stadium	
2011	Luke Hochevar	L	2–4	Los Angeles Angels of Anaheim	Kauffman Stadium	
2012	Bruce Chen	L	0–5	Los Angeles Angels of Anaheim	Angel Stadium of Anaheim	
2013	James Shields	L	0–1	Chicago White Sox	U.S. Cellular Field	
2014**	James Shields (2)	ND (L)	3–4	Detroit Tigers	Comerica Park	
2015†	Yordano Ventura	W	10–1	Chicago White Sox	Kauffman Stadium	
2016	Edinson Vólquez	W	4–3	New York Mets	Kauffman Stadium	
2017	Danny Duffy	ND (L)	1–7	Minnesota Twins	Target Field	
2018	Danny Duffy (2)	L	7–14	Chicago White Sox	Kauffman Stadium	
2019	Brad Keller	W	5–3	Chicago White Sox	Kauffman Stadium	
2020	Danny Duffy (3)	L	0–2	Cleveland Indians	Progressive Field	
2021	Brad Keller (2)	ND (W)	14–10	Texas Rangers	Kauffman Stadium	
2022	Zack Greinke (2)	ND (W)	3–1	Cleveland Guardians	Kauffman Stadium	
2023	Zack Greinke (3)	L	0–2	Minnesota Twins	Kauffman Stadium	
2024*	Cole Ragans	L	1–4	Minnesota Twins	Kauffman Stadium	
2025	Cole Ragans (2)	ND (L)	4–7	Cleveland Guardians	Kauffman Stadium	
2026	Cole Ragans (3)	L	0–6	Atlanta Braves	Truist Park	
