= 1969 California Angels season =

Major League Baseball season

1969 California Angels
- League: American League
- Division: West
- Ballpark: Anaheim Stadium
- City: Anaheim, California
- Record: 71–91 (.438)
- Divisional place: 3rd
- Owner: Gene Autry
- General manager: Dick Walsh
- Managers: Bill Rigney, Lefty Phillips
- Television: KTLA
- Radio: KMPC (Dick Enberg, Don Wells, Steve Bailey, Dave Niehaus)
- Stats: ESPN.com; Baseball Reference

The 1969 California Angels season was the 9th season of the Angels franchise in the American League, the 4th in Anaheim, and their 4th season playing their home games at Anaheim Stadium. In the first season following the split of the American League into two divisions, the Angels finished third in the newly established American League West with a record of 71 wins and 91 losses.

== Offseason ==
- October 8, 1968: Eddie Fisher was traded by the Cleveland Indians to the California Angels for Jack Hamilton.
- October 15, 1968: 1968 MLB expansion draft
  - Paul Schaal was drafted from the Angels by the Kansas City Royals with the 27th pick.
  - Steve Hovley was drafted from the Angels by the Seattle Pilots with the 35th pick.
- November 6, 1968: Rubén Amaro Sr. was purchased by the Angels from the New York Yankees.
- December 2, 1968: Pedro Borbón was drafted by the Angels from the St. Louis Cardinals in the 1968 rule 5 draft.
- December 12, 1968: Ed Kirkpatrick and Dennis Paepke were traded by the Angels to the Kansas City Royals for Hoyt Wilhelm.

== Regular season ==
=== Season standings ===
AL West
Team	W	L	Pct.	GB	Home	Road
Minnesota Twins	97	65	.599	—	57‍–‍24	40‍–‍41
Oakland Athletics	88	74	.543	9	49‍–‍32	39‍–‍42
California Angels	71	91	.438	26	43‍–‍38	28‍–‍53
Kansas City Royals	69	93	.426	28	36‍–‍45	33‍–‍48
Chicago White Sox	68	94	.420	29	41‍–‍40	27‍–‍54
Seattle Pilots	64	98	.395	33	34‍–‍47	30‍–‍51

=== Record vs. opponents ===
1969 American League records Sources:
Team	BAL	BOS	CAL	CWS	CLE	DET	KC	MIN	NYY	OAK	SEA	WAS
Baltimore	—	10–8	6–6	9–3	13–5	11–7	11–1	8–4	11–7	8–4	9–3	13–5
Boston	8–10	—	8–4	5–7	12–6	10–8	10–2	7–5	11–7	4–8	6–6	6–12
California	6–6	4–8	—	9–9	8–4	5–7	9–9	7–11	3–9	6–12	9–9–1	5–7
Chicago	3–9	7–5	9–9	—	8–4	3–9	8–10	5–13	3–9	8–10	10–8	4–8
Cleveland	5–13	6–12	4–8	4–8	—	7–11	7–5	5–7	9–8	5–7	7–5	3–15
Detroit	7–11	8–10	7–5	9–3	11–7	—	8–4	6–6	10–8	7–5	10–2	7–11
Kansas City	1–11	2–10	9–9	10–8	5–7	4–8	—	8–10	5–7–1	8–10	10–8	7–5
Minnesota	4–8	5–7	11–7	13–5	7–5	6–6	10–8	—	10–2	13–5	12–6	6–6
New York	7–11	7–11	9–3	9–3	8–9	8–10	7–5–1	2–10	—	6–6	7–5	10–8
Oakland	4–8	8–4	12–6	10–8	7–5	5–7	10–8	5–13	6–6	—	13–5	8–4
Seattle	3–9	6–6	9–9–1	8–10	5–7	2–10	8–10	6–12	5–7	5–13	—	7–5
Washington	5–13	12–6	7–5	8–4	15–3	11–7	5–7	6–6	8–10	4–8	5–7	—

=== Notable transactions ===
- April 3, 1969: Bo Belinsky was purchased by the Angels from the St. Louis Cardinals.
- May 14, 1969: Bobby Knoop was traded by the Angels to the Chicago White Sox for Sandy Alomar Sr. and Bob Priddy.
- June 5, 1969: Rudy Meoli was drafted by the Angels in the 4th round of the 1969 Major League Baseball draft. Player signed June 13, 1969.
- June 15, 1969: Tom Satriano was traded by the Angels to the Boston Red Sox for Joe Azcue.
- July 26, 1969: Billy Cowan was purchased by the Angels from the New York Yankees.
- July 30, 1969: Bo Belinsky was purchased from the Angels by the Pittsburgh Pirates.
- September 8, 1969: Hoyt Wilhelm and Bob Priddy were traded by the Angels to the Atlanta Braves for Mickey Rivers and Clint Compton.

=== Roster ===
1969 California Angels
Roster
Pitchers: 51,50,40 Lloyd Allen; 33 Pedro Borbón; 29 Tom Bradley; 43 George Brunet; 44 Rickey Clark; 24 Eddie Fisher; 17 Vern Geishert; 31,43 Steve Kealey; 34 Rudy May; 45 Jim McGlothlin; 47 Andy Messersmith; 41 Tom Murphy; 31 Phil Ortega; 40 Bob Priddy; 40,19 Ken Tatum; 23 Greg Washburn; 39 Hoyt Wilhelm; 39 Wally Wolf; 38 Clyde Wright	Catchers: 2 Joe Azcue; 28 Randy Brown; 30 Tom Egan; 7 Buck Rodgers; 2 Tom Satriano; Infielders: 5 Sandy Alomar Sr.; 12 Rubén Amaro Sr.; 37 Bob Chance; 4 Chuck Cottier; 11 Jim Fregosi; 29 Bobby Knoop; 14 Winston Llenas; 42 Marty Perez; 1 Aurelio Rodríguez; 9 Jim Spencer; 5 Dick Stuart	Outfielders: 35 Billy Cowan; 28 Vic Davalillo; 5 Jim Hicks; 26 Lou Johnson; 10 Jay Johnstone; 27 Bubba Morton; 3 Rick Reichardt; 6 Roger Repoz; 8 Jarvis Tatum; 32 Bill Voss	Manager: 36 Lefty Phillips; 18 Bill Rigney; Coaches: 22 Rocky Bridges; 20 Marv Grissom; 48 Mickey McDermott; 36 Lefty Phillips; 21 Mike Roarke

== Player stats ==
=== Batting ===
==== Starters by position ====
Note: Pos = Position; G = Games played; AB = At bats; H = Hits; Avg. = Batting average; HR = Home runs; RBI = Runs batted in

Pos	Player	G	AB	H	Avg.	HR	RBI
C	Joe Azcue	80	248	54	.218	1	19
1B	Jim Spencer	113	386	98	.254	10	31
2B	Sandy Alomar Sr.	134	559	140	.250	1	30
3B	Aurelio Rodríguez	159	561	130	.232	7	49
SS	Jim Fregosi	161	580	151	.260	12	47
LF	Rick Reichardt	137	493	125	.254	13	68
CF	Jay Johnstone	148	540	146	.270	10	59
RF	Bill Voss	133	349	91	.261	2	40

==== Other batters ====
Note: G = Games played; AB = At bats; H = Hits; Avg. = Batting average; HR = Home runs; RBI = Runs batted in

Player	G	AB	H	Avg.	HR	RBI
Roger Repoz	103	219	36	.164	8	19
Bubba Morton	87	172	42	.244	7	32
Lou Johnson	67	133	27	.203	0	9
Tom Egan	46	120	17	.142	5	16
Tom Satriano	41	108	28	.259	1	16
Vic Davalillo	33	71	11	.155	0	1
Bobby Knoop	27	71	14	.197	1	6
Billy Cowan	28	56	17	.304	4	10
Dick Stuart	22	51	8	.157	1	4
Jim Hicks	37	48	4	.083	3	8
Winston Llenas	34	47	8	.170	0	0
Buck Rodgers	18	46	9	.196	0	2
Rubén Amaro Sr.	41	27	6	.222	0	1
Randy Brown	13	25	4	.160	0	0
Jarvis Tatum	10	22	7	.318	0	0
Marty Perez	13	13	3	.231	0	0
Bob Chance	5	7	1	.143	0	1
Chuck Cottier	2	2	0	.000	0	0

=== Pitching ===
==== Starting pitchers ====
Note: G = Games pitched; IP = Innings pitched; W = Wins; L = Losses; ERA = Earned run average; SO = Strikeouts

Player	G	IP	W	L	ERA	SO
Andy Messersmith	40	250.0	16	11	2.52	211
Tom Murphy	36	215.2	10	16	4.21	100
Jim McGlothlin	37	201.0	8	16	3.18	96
George Brunet	23	100.2	6	7	3.84	56

==== Other pitchers ====
Note: G = Games pitched; IP = Innings pitched; W = Wins; L = Losses; ERA = Earned run average; SO = Strikeouts

Player	G	IP	W	L	ERA	SO
Rudy May	43	180.1	10	13	3.44	133
Clyde Wright	37	63.2	1	8	4.10	31
Steve Kealey	15	36.2	2	0	3.93	17
Vern Geishert	11	31.0	1	1	4.65	18
Greg Washburn	8	11.1	0	2	7.94	4
Lloyd Allen	4	10.0	0	1	5.40	5
Rickey Clark	6	9.2	0	0	5.59	6

==== Relief pitchers ====
Note: G = Games pitched; W = Wins; L = Losses; SV = Saves; ERA = Earned run average; SO = Strikeouts

Player	G	W	L	SV	ERA	SO
Ken Tatum	45	7	2	22	1.36	65
Eddie Fisher	52	3	2	2	3.63	47
Hoyt Wilhelm	44	5	7	10	2.47	53
Pedro Borbón	22	2	3	0	6.15	20
Bob Priddy	15	0	1	0	4.78	15
Phil Ortega	5	0	0	0	10.13	4
Wally Wolf	2	0	0	0	11.57	2
Tom Bradley	3	0	1	0	27.00	2

== Farm system ==
Level	Team	League	Manager
AAA	Hawaii Islanders	Pacific Coast League	Chuck Tanner
AA	El Paso Sun Kings	Texas League	Del Rice
A	San Jose Bees	California League	Tom Morgan and Eddie Bressoud
A	Quad Cities Angels	Midwest League	Fred Koenig
Rookie	Idaho Falls Angels	Pioneer League	Norm Sherry

Records
Preceded by 1968	California Angels seasons 1969	Succeeded by 1970
