= 1974 Kansas City Royals season =

1974 Kansas City Royals
- League: American League
- Division: West
- Ballpark: Royals Stadium
- City: Kansas City, Missouri
- Record: 77–85 (.475)
- Divisional place: 5th
- Owners: Ewing Kauffman
- General managers: Cedric Tallis, Joe Burke
- Managers: Jack McKeon (second season)
- Television: KBMA
- Radio: KMBZ (Buddy Blattner, Denny Matthews, Fred White)

The 1974 Kansas City Royals season was their sixth in Major League Baseball. The Royals finished fifth in the American League West at 77–85, 13 games behind the Oakland Athletics. Pitcher Steve Busby set a single-season franchise record with 22 victories.

== Offseason ==
- October 24, 1973: Dick Drago was traded by the Royals to the Boston Red Sox for Marty Pattin.
- December 7, 1973: Lou Piniella and Ken Wright were traded by the Royals to the New York Yankees for Lindy McDaniel. Baseball author Bill James called the trade the only clinker the Royals made during the 1970s.
- January 9, 1974: Mark Souza was drafted by the Royals in the 1st round (17th pick) of the 1974 Major League Baseball draft.

== Regular season ==
=== Notable transactions ===
- April 30, 1974: Paul Schaal was traded by the Royals to the California Angels for Richie Scheinblum.
- June 5, 1974: 1974 Major League Baseball draft
  - Willie Wilson was drafted by the Royals in the 1st round (18th pick).
  - Scott Sanderson was drafted by the Royals in the 11th round, but did not sign.
- June 11, 1974: Doug Corbett was signed by the Royals as an amateur free agent.
- August 6, 1974: Orlando Cepeda signed as a free agent by the Royals.
- September 27, 1974: Orlando Cepeda was released by the Royals.

=== Season standings ===
AL West
Team	W	L	Pct.	GB	Home	Road
Oakland Athletics	90	72	.556	—	49‍–‍32	41‍–‍40
Texas Rangers	84	76	.525	5	42‍–‍38	42‍–‍38
Minnesota Twins	82	80	.506	8	48‍–‍33	34‍–‍47
Chicago White Sox	80	80	.500	9	46‍–‍34	34‍–‍46
Kansas City Royals	77	85	.475	13	40‍–‍41	37‍–‍44
California Angels	68	94	.420	22	36‍–‍45	32‍–‍49

=== Record vs. opponents ===
1974 American League record Sources:
Team	BAL	BOS	CAL	CWS	CLE	DET	KC	MIL	MIN	NYY	OAK	TEX
Baltimore	—	10–8	7–5	5–7	12–6	14–4	8–4	8–10	6–6	11–7	6–6	4–8
Boston	8–10	—	4–8	8–4	9–9	11–7	4–8	10–8	6–6	11–7	8–4	5–7
California	5–7	8–4	—	10–8–1	3–9	5–7	8–10	3–9	8–10	3–9	6–12	9–9
Chicago	7–5	4–8	8–10–1	—	8–4	7–5	11–7	8–4	7–11–1	4–8	7–11	9–7–1
Cleveland	6–12	9–9	9–3	4–8	—	9–9	8–4	10–8	6–6	7–11	5–7	4–8
Detroit	4–14	7–11	7–5	5–7	9–9	—	7–5	9–9	3–9	11–7	5–7	5–7
Kansas City	4–8	8–4	10–8	7–11	4–8	5–7	—	11–1	8–10	4–8	8–10	8–10
Milwaukee	10–8	8–10	9–3	4–8	8–10	9–9	1–11	—	6–6	9–9	5–7	7–5
Minnesota	6–6	6–6	10–8	11–7–1	6–6	9–3	10–8	6–6	—	4–8	5–13	9–9
New York	7–11	7–11	9–3	8–4	11–7	7–11	8–4	9–9	8–4	—	7–5	8–4
Oakland	6–6	4–8	12–6	11–7	7–5	7–5	10–8	7–5	13–5	5–7	—	8–10
Texas	8–4	7–5	9–9	7–9–1	8–4	7–5	10–8	5–7	9–9	4–8	10–8	—

=== Roster ===
1974 Kansas City Royals
Roster
Pitchers: 29 Doug Bird; 19 Nelson Briles; 40 Steve Busby; 43 Bruce Dal Canton; 39 Al Fitzmorris; 32 Gene Garber; 27 Joe Hoerner; 22 Dennis Leonard; 38 Aurelio López; 41 Lindy McDaniel; 23 Steve Mingori; 33 Marty Pattin; 34 Paul Splittorff	Catchers: 16 Fran Healy; 21 Buck Martinez; 17 Dennis Paepke; Infielders: 2 Kurt Bevacqua; 25 George Brett; 15 Bobby Floyd; 13 Fernando González; 7 John Mayberry; 37 Freddie Patek; 1 Cookie Rojas; 10 Paul Schaal; 8 Tony Solaita; 20 Frank White	Outfielders: 18 Al Cowens; 11 Hal McRae; 26 Amos Otis; 28 Vada Pinson; 5 Richie Scheinblum; 6 Jim Wohlford; Other batters: 30 Orlando Cepeda; 48 Rick Reichardt	Manager: 31 Jack McKeon; Coaches: 3 Galen Cisco (Pitching); 4 Harry Dunlop (Third base); 24 Charley Lau (Hitting and first base)

== Player stats ==
= Indicates team leader

=== Batting ===
==== Starters by position ====
Note: Pos = Position; G = Games played; AB = At bats; H = Hits; Avg. = Batting average; HR = Home runs; RBI = Runs batted in

Pos	Player	G	AB	H	Avg.	HR	RBI
C	Fran Healy	139	445	112	.252	9	53
1B	John Mayberry	126	427	100	.234	22	69
2B	Cookie Rojas	144	542	147	.271	6	60
SS	Freddie Patek	149	537	121	.225	3	38
3B	George Brett	133	457	129	.282	2	47
LF	Jim Wohlford	143	501	136	.271	2	44
CF	Amos Otis	146	552	157	.284	12	73
RF	Vada Pinson	115	406	112	.276	6	41
DH	Hal McRae	148	539	167	.310	15	88

==== Other batters ====
Note: G = Games played; AB = At bats; H = Hits; Avg. = Batting average; HR = Home runs; RBI = Runs batted in

Player	G	AB	H	Avg.	HR	RBI
Al Cowens	110	269	65	.242	1	25
Howard Gold	96	239	64	.268	11	30
Frank White	99	204	45	.221	1	18
Buck Martinez	43	107	23	.215	1	8
Orlando Cepeda	33	107	23	.215	1	18
Kurt Bevacqua	39	90	19	.211	0	3
Richie Scheinblum	36	83	15	.181	0	2
Paul Schaal	12	34	6	.176	1	4
Fernando González	9	21	3	.143	0	2
Dennis Paepke	6	12	2	.167	0	0
Bobby Floyd	10	9	1	.111	0	0
Rick Reichardt	1	1	1	1.000	0	0

=== Pitching ===
==== Starting pitchers ====
Note: G = Games pitched; IP = Innings pitched; W = Wins; L = Losses; ERA = Earned run average; SO = Strikeouts

Player	G	IP	W	L	ERA	SO
Steve Busby	38	292.1	22	14	3.39	198
Paul Splittorff	36	226.0	13	19	4.10	90
Al Fitzmorris	34	190.0	13	6	2.79	53
Bruce Dal Canton	31	175.1	8	10	3.13	96
Nelson Briles	17	103.0	5	7	4.02	41

==== Other pitchers ====
Note: G = Games pitched; IP = Innings pitched; W = Wins; L = Losses; ERA = Earned run average; SO = Strikeouts

Player	G	IP	W	L	ERA	SO
Marty Pattin	25	117.1	3	7	3.99	50
Dennis Leonard	5	22.0	0	4	5.32	8
Aurelio López	8	16.0	0	0	5.63	5

==== Relief pitchers ====
Note: G = Games pitched; W = Wins; L = Losses; SV = Saves; ERA = Earned run average; SO = Strikeouts

Player	G	W	L	SV	ERA	SO
Doug Bird	55	7	6	10	2.73	62
Lindy McDaniel	38	1	4	1	3.46	47
Steve Mingori	36	2	3	2	2.81	43
Joe Hoerner	30	2	3	2	3.82	24
Gene Garber	17	1	2	1	4.82	14

== Awards and honors ==
All-Star Game

- John Mayberry, 1B, Reserve
- Cookie Rojas, 2B, Resserve
- Steve Busby, Pitcher, Injured, Did not play

== Farm system ==
Level	Team	League	Manager
AAA	Omaha Royals	American Association	Harry Malmberg
AA	Jacksonville Suns	Southern League	Billy Gardner
A	San Jose Bees	California League	Steve Boros
A	Waterloo Royals	Midwest League	John Sullivan
Rookie	GCL Royals	Gulf Coast League	Bill Scripture
Rookie	GCL Royals Academy	Gulf Coast League	Billy Goodman
