= Juan Ríos (baseball) =

Puerto Rican baseball player (1942-1995)

Juan Rios
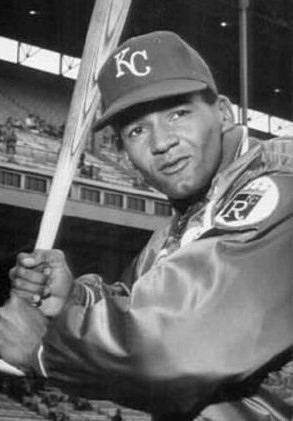
- Second baseman / Shortstop
- Born: June 14, 1942; Mayagüez, Puerto Rico
- Died: August 28, 1995 (aged 53); Mayagüez, Puerto Rico
- Batted: Right Threw: Right

MLB debut
- April 9, 1969, for the Kansas City Royals

Last MLB appearance
- October 2, 1969, for the Kansas City Royals

MLB statistics
- Batting average: .224
- Hits: 44
- Games played: 87
- Stats at Baseball Reference

Teams
- Kansas City Royals (1969)

Juan Onofre Vélez Ríos (June 14, 1942 – August 28, 1995) was a Puerto Rican Major League Baseball (MLB) shortstop and second baseman who played for one season. Originally signed by the New York Mets, Rios played for the Kansas City Royals for 87 games during the inaugural 1969 Kansas City Royals season.
