= Ron Northey =

American baseball player (1920–1971)

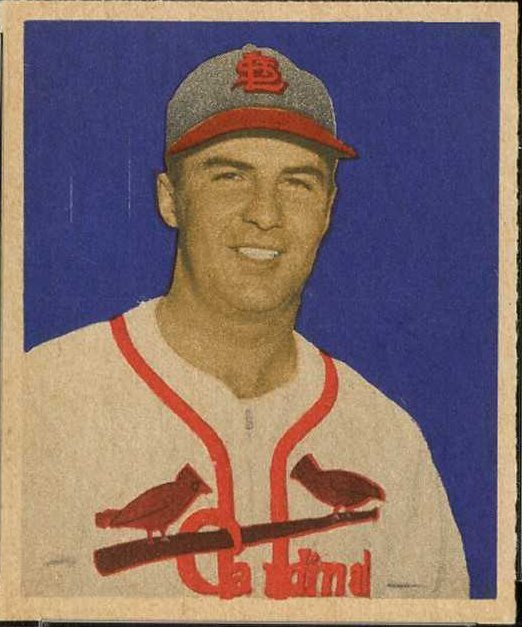
- Right fielder
- Born: April 26, 1920; Mahanoy City, Pennsylvania, U.S.
- Died: April 16, 1971 (aged 50); Pittsburgh, Pennsylvania, U.S.
- Batted: Left Threw: Right

MLB debut
- April 14, 1942, for the Philadelphia Phillies

Last MLB appearance
- September 28, 1957, for the Philadelphia Phillies

MLB statistics
- Batting average: .276
- Home runs: 108
- Runs batted in: 513
- Stats at Baseball Reference

Teams
- Philadelphia Phillies (1942–1944, 1946–1947); St. Louis Cardinals (1947–1949); Cincinnati Reds (1950); Chicago Cubs (1950, 1952); Chicago White Sox (1955–1957); Philadelphia Phillies (1957)

Ronald James Northey (April 26, 1920 – April 16, 1971) was an American professional baseball player and coach. He was an outfielder for the Philadelphia Phillies (1942–44, 1946–47 and 1957), St. Louis Cardinals (1947–49), Cincinnati Reds (1950), Chicago Cubs (1950 and 1952) and Chicago White Sox (1955–57). Northey was born in Mahanoy City, Pennsylvania; he batted left-handed, threw right-handed, stood 5 ft 10 in (1.78 m) tall and weighed 195 lb (88 kg) during his playing career. His son, Scott Northey, also was a Major League outfielder.

== Early life ==
Northey graduated from Frackville High School and went to Duke University.

== Military service ==
Northey was drafted into the United States Army in 1945 and conducted his initial training at New Cumberland Army Reception Center near Harrisburg, Pennsylvania. He was subsequently based at Fort Lewis, Washington and was discharged in 1946. He played baseball while serving in the army.

== Baseball career ==
Ron Northey finished 29th in voting for the 1943 National League MVP, and 18th in voting for the 1944 NL MVP. In 12 MLB seasons, he played in 1,084 games and had 3,172 at bats, with 385 runs scored, 874 hits, 172 doubles, 28 triples, 108 home runs, 513 runs batted in, seven stolen bases, 361 walks, a .276 batting average, .352 on-base percentage, .450 slugging percentage, 1,426 total bases and 14 sacrifice hits. Northey was especially adept as a pinch hitter: he appeared in 297 games as an emergency batsman and batted .288, with 69 hits—including nine pinch homers, eight doubles and two triples, and 75 runs batted in. In 1956, as a member of the White Sox, he batted .385 and collected 15 pinch hits, with three homers and 21 RBI.

Northey was a coach on the staff of skipper Danny Murtaugh, his former teammate on the early 1940s Phillies, with the Pittsburgh Pirates from 1961 to 1963. He died suddenly in Pittsburgh at the age of 50 after being taken ill at his home. He is buried at Fairfield Memorial Park, Stamford, Connecticut.
