= Rich Severson =

American baseball player (1945-2016)

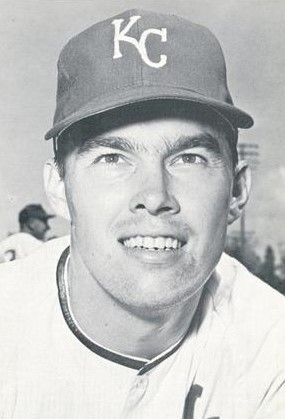
- Shortstop
- Born: January 18, 1945; Artesia, California, U.S.
- Died: January 19, 2016 (aged 71); Omaha, Nebraska, U.S.
- Batted: Right Threw: Right

MLB debut
- April 10, 1970, for the Kansas City Royals

Last MLB appearance
- September 29, 1971, for the Kansas City Royals

MLB statistics
- Batting average: .256
- Home runs: 1
- Runs batted in: 23
- Stats at Baseball Reference

Teams
- Kansas City Royals (1970–1971)

Richard Allen Severson (January 18, 1945 – January 19, 2016) was an American professional baseball shortstop. He played in Major League Baseball (MLB) in 77 games for the Kansas City Royals during the 1970 season and 16 games during the 1971 season.
