= Pinch hitter =

Term for a substitute batter in baseball and softball

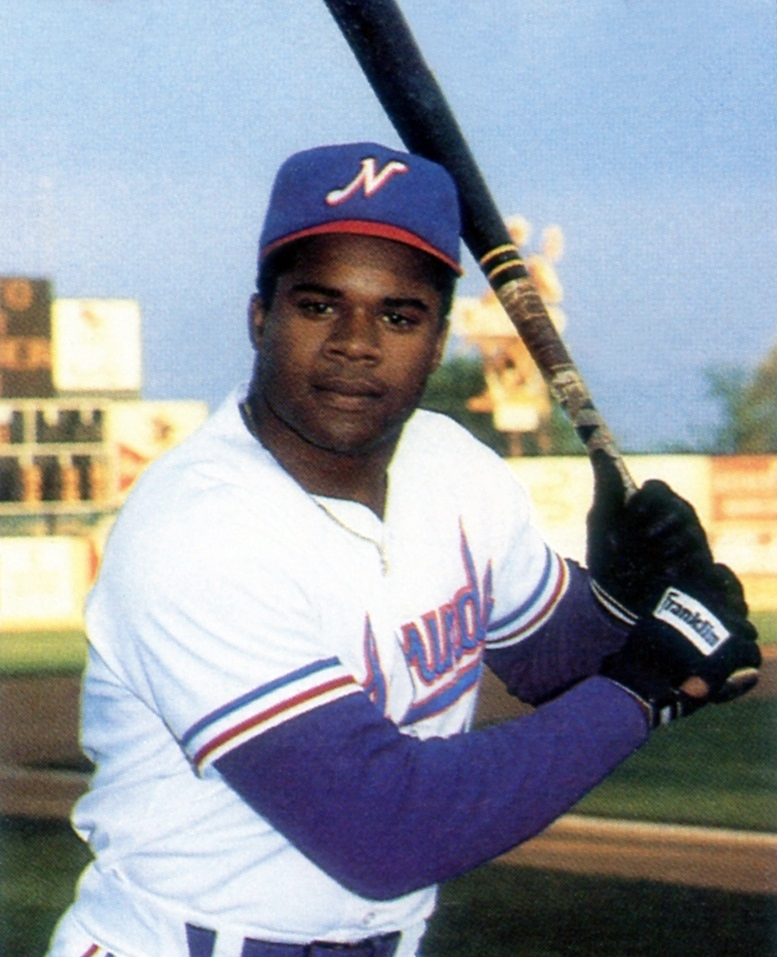
Lenny Harris had 212 hits in 804 pinch hit at bats, both records in Major League Baseball.

In baseball, a pinch hitter (PH) is a substitute batter. Batters can be substituted at any time while the ball is dead (not in active play). The manager may use any player who has not yet entered the game as a substitute. Like association football but unlike basketball, American football and ice hockey, baseball does not have a free substitution rule at the professional level and thus the replaced player is not allowed back into that game. The pinch hitter assumes the spot in the batting order of the player whom he replaces. Pinch hitters are commonly used to replace a weak hitter or to gain a platoon advantage.

The player chosen to be a pinch hitter is often a backup infielder or outfielder whose defensive skills are limited. In Major League Baseball (MLB), catchers are less likely to be called upon to pinch-hit, because most teams have only two catchers, though the catcher currently on the bench is often called to pinch hit for the current catcher late in a game, to set up a defensive replacement. Pitchers are rarely used as pinch hitters, because they tend to be worse hitters than other players on the team. However, some pitchers have been used as pinch hitters; this tactic had almost vanished by the 1980s, but later saw a comeback in situations when benches have diminished due to injuries, offering few other options beyond a team's 12 or 13 pitchers.

MLB, the Pacific League of Nippon Professional Baseball (NPB), the KBO League (in South Korea), the Liga Mexicana de Béisbol (in Mexico), and various other leagues use the designated hitter rule, such that pitchers rarely bat. This eliminates one possible situation in which a pinch hitter may be more desirable.

For statistical and scorekeeping purposes, the pinch hitter is denoted by "PH".

== Usage ==
Pinch hitters are often used to replace a starting player because of injury or when the pinch hitter is thought to have a better chance of reaching the base or helping other runners to score.

When the designated hitter rule is not in effect (e.g., in the Central League in NPB, in the National League before 2022 and American League before 1973 in MLB and leagues such as the Atlantic League which use the double hook rule), pinch hitters are often substituted for the pitcher in the middle or late innings of a game. This is because pitchers are usually poor hitters and may become less effective after six to seven innings of pitching. Thus, as the manager typically plans to replace the pitcher in the next inning, the player being replaced cannot re-enter the game, the major downside of using a pinch hitter.

This use of a pinch hitter is normally part of a double switch, in which a relief pitcher replaces a defensive player who will not bat soon, and at the same time a defensive player replaces the pitcher who is scheduled to bat soon. If a player acts as a pinch hitter and his team bats around in the inning, he may come to the plate a second time. The second (and subsequent) times he bats in the inning are not considered pinch-hitting appearances.

The pinch hitter need not (but may) assume the same position as the player for whom he pinch-hits as long as some other player assumes that position. For example, on August 16, 2009, the Washington Nationals' Ryan Zimmerman pinch-hit for second baseman Alberto González and then remained in the game at third base, with previous third baseman Ronnie Belliard switching positions to play second base after the change. Alternatively, the manager may designate another player to replace the pinch hitter; this scenario is common when a team pinch-hits for a pitcher without executing a double switch, such that the new pitcher then replaces the pinch hitter and assumes the previous pitcher's place in the batting order.

If a pinch hitter hits for the DH, the new pinch hitter stays in the game as a DH, and may not be used in the field. If the new DH does take the field, then the team forfeits the DH for the remainder of the game (thus, causing the pitcher to enter the batting order).

== MLB all-time pinch hit leaders ==
This is a list of players with the most pinch hits in Major League Baseball history. Names which appear in bold are active players. Includes games through July 22, 2011.

Rank	Player	Hits
1	Lenny Harris	212
2	Mark Sweeney	175
3	Manny Mota	149
4	Smoky Burgess	145
5	Greg Gross	143
6	Dave Hansen	138
7	John Vander Wal	129
8	José Morales	123
9	Orlando Palmeiro	120
10	Jerry Lynch	116
11	Red Lucas	114
12	Steve Braun	113
13	Terry Crowley	108
14	Denny Walling	108
15	Gates Brown	107
16	Matt Stairs	105
17	Jim Dwyer	103
18	Mike Lum	103
19	Rusty Staub	100
20	Greg Dobbs	98
21	Dave Clark	96
22	Vic Davalillo	95

== All-time pinch hit records ==
- Most pinch-hit at-bats

Lenny Harris – 804

- Most pinch hits career

Lenny Harris – 212

- Most pinch-hit grand slams

Rich Reese, Willie McCovey, Ron Northey, and Ben Broussard – 3 (tied)

- Most pinch-hit home runs

Matt Stairs – 23

- Most pinch-hit game-winning grand slams

Brooks Conrad – 2

- Most pinch-hit grand slams by one team in a season

Atlanta Braves – 3 total in 2010

== Single season pinch hit records ==
- Most pinch hit games

Ichiro Suzuki – 109 (2017)

- Most pinch hit at-bats

Ichiro Suzuki – 100 (2017)

- Most pinch hits

John Vander Wal – 28 (1995)

- Most consecutive pinch hits

Dave Philley and Rusty Staub – tied with eight each (1958 and 1983)

- Most pinch hit home runs

Dave Hansen and Craig Wilson – tied with seven each (2000 and 2001)

- Most pinch hit game winning grand slam home runs

Brooks Conrad – 2 (2010)

- Most pinch hit home runs for a team in a game

St. Louis Cardinals (Jeremy Hazelbaker, Aledmys Diaz and Greg Garcia) – 3 (April 8, 2016)

- Most pinch hit RBI

Joe Cronin, Jerry Lynch, Rusty Staub – tied with 25 each (1943, 1961 and 1983)

- Most pinch hit walks

Matt Joyce – 21 (2016)

== Pinch hit home runs ==
- The following players have been called into a game and hit a pinch-hit home run during their first ever Major League at-bat:

American League
Date	Name	Team	Inning
April 30, 1937	Ace Parker	Philadelphia	9th Inning
September 5, 1962	John Kennedy	Washington	6th Inning
June 19, 1963	Gates Brown	Detroit	5th Inning
September 30, 1964	Bill Roman	Detroit	7th Inning
September 12, 1965	Brant Alyea	Washington	6th Inning
August 7, 1968	Joe Keough	Oakland	8th Inning
April 7, 1977	Alvis Woods	Toronto	5th Inning

National League
Date	Name	Team	Inning
April 21, 1898	Bill Duggleby	Philadelphia	2nd inning
April 14, 1936	Eddie Morgan	St. Louis	7th Inning
May 21, 1948	Les Layton	New York	9th Inning
September 14, 1950	Ted Tappe	Cincinnati	8th Inning
April 12, 1955	Chuck Tanner	Milwaukee	8th Inning
September 8, 1998	Marlon Anderson	Philadelphia	7th Inning
April 17, 2001	Gene Stechschulte	St. Louis	6th Inning
August 21, 2005	Mike Jacobs	New York	5th Inning
September 1, 2005	Jeremy Hermida	Florida	7th Inning
September 4, 2006	Charlton Jimerson	Houston	6th Inning
September 8, 2008	Mark Saccomanno	Houston	5th Inning
August 28, 2009	John Hester	Arizona	6th Inning

== See also ==
- Designated hitter – Offensive position in baseball and softball
- Pinch runner – Substitute baserunner in baseball or softball
