= Greg Washburn =

American baseball player (born 1946)

- Pitcher
- Born: December 3, 1946 (age 79); Coal City, Illinois, U.S.
- Batted: Right Threw: Right

MLB debut
- June 7, 1969, for the California Angels

Last MLB appearance
- September 21, 1969, for the California Angels

MLB statistics
- Win–loss record: 0–2
- Earned run average: 7.94
- Strikeouts: 4
- Stats at Baseball Reference

Teams
- California Angels (1969)

Gregory James Washburn (born December 3, 1946) is an American former professional baseball pitcher who appeared in eight games in the major leagues for the California Angels in 1969. A native of Coal City, Illinois, he batted and threw right-handed and was listed as 6 feet (1.8 m) tall and 190 pounds (86 kg).

Washburn graduated from Coal City Hill School and was drafted by the Angels out of Lewis University in the first round of the 1967 amateur draft as the 19th overall pick. After almost 21/2 successful seasons in the minor leagues, he was promoted to the 1969 Angels in midyear. He made six appearances between June 7 and July 13, including two assignments as a starting pitcher at Anaheim Stadium. He was the losing pitcher in each start, against the Chicago White Sox on June 20 and the Seattle Pilots seven days later. He made two relief appearances in September 1969 to round out what would be his MLB career.

In eight games, he posted a won–lost mark of 0–2 with five games finished. In 111/3 innings pitched, he permitted 21 hits, ten earned runs, and five bases on balls, and recorded four strikeouts. His seven-year professional career, all spent in the Angels' organization, concluded in 1973.
