= Fran Healy (baseball) =

American baseball player (born 1946)

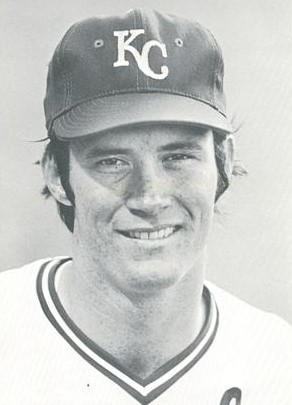
- Healy in 1976
- Catcher
- Born: September 6, 1946 (age 79); Holyoke, Massachusetts, U.S.
- Batted: Right Threw: Right

MLB debut
- September 3, 1969, for the Kansas City Royals

Last MLB appearance
- April 21, 1978, for the New York Yankees

MLB statistics
- Batting average: .250
- Home runs: 20
- Runs batted in: 141
- Stats at Baseball Reference

Teams
- Kansas City Royals (1969); San Francisco Giants (1971–1972); Kansas City Royals (1973–1976); New York Yankees (1976–1978)

Career highlights and awards
- World Series champion (1977)

Francis Xavier Healy (born September 6, 1946) is an American former Major League Baseball catcher and sports broadcaster. He had a long tenure calling television broadcasts for the New York Mets on the MSG Network and Fox Sports Net New York.

== Playing career ==
In his baseball career, Healy played for the Kansas City Royals, San Francisco Giants and New York Yankees, accumulating a .250 career batting average. The highlight of his time with the Royals came in 1973 and 1974, when Healy caught Steve Busby's two career no-hitters, against the Detroit Tigers and Milwaukee Brewers respectively. Healy had a close relationship with Reggie Jackson while on the Yankees, where he served as a mediator between the fiery slugger and Yankee manager Billy Martin as well as teammate, captain Thurman Munson.

== Broadcasting career ==
After his playing career ended in 1978, he worked on radio broadcasts for the Yankees until 1981. In 1979, he added the Yankees' cable television broadcasts on SportsChannel (which became Fox Sports Net New York) to the resume, staying with the cable crew until the end of the 1983 season. Healy worked on Mets telecasts from 1984 to 2005, also working as the host of Mets Inside Pitch and Halls of Fame, a series that profiled careers of famous athletes (and originally taking its name from the cough drop company that shared the name). In 1987, Healy interviewed former President Richard Nixon during one of his post-game shows, discussing a range of baseball issues of the day. He is one of three sportscasters who was a regular announcer for both the Yankees and the Mets; the others are Tom Seaver and Tim McCarver.

When Keith Hernandez was added to Mets telecasts, Healy and Hernandez's game-calling often became humorous, pointing to a sometimes-contentious relationship between the two. Healy was not signed to be part of the Mets' new cable channel, SportsNet New York, for 2006. Healy is the current host of "The Game 365" on MSG Network, in New York City. The show profiles many athletes and coaches in sports.
