= Fred Rico =

American baseball player (born 1944)

- Right fielder / Third baseman
- Born: July 4, 1944 (age 82); Jerome, Arizona, U.S.
- Batted: Right Threw: Right

MLB debut
- September 1, 1969, for the Kansas City Royals

Last MLB appearance
- October 2, 1969, for the Kansas City Royals

MLB statistics
- Batting average: .231
- Home runs: 0
- Runs batted in: 2
- Stats at Baseball Reference

Teams
- Kansas City Royals (1969)

Alfredo Rico Cruz (born July 4, 1944) is an American former Major League Baseball outfielder. He was signed by the Baltimore Orioles before the 1964 season, and later drafted by the Kansas City Royals from the Orioles in the 1968 rule V draft. (December 2, 1968)

He was called up by the expansion Royals from Triple-A Omaha when rosters expanded in September 1969. Rico got into 12 games during his one month with Kansas City, including seven in the starting lineup. He did an excellent job in the field, making no errors in 31 chances, including two innings as a third baseman.

Though he had a low batting average of .231 (6-for-26), he had a high on-base percentage of .429 because he also walked 9 times.

While playing again for Omaha, Rico was traded to the St. Louis Cardinals organization for second baseman Cookie Rojas on June 13, 1970. Assigned to stay in the minors, he went to the Tulsa Oilers, also of the American Association. He had an excellent season for Tulsa in 1971, batting .296 with 19 HR and 101 RBI, and was acquired by the Minnesota Twins organization on September 14. He was listed on Minnesota's 1972 spring roster, but never again reached the major league level.
