= Scott Northey =

American baseball player

- Center fielder
- Born: October 15, 1946 (age 79); Philadelphia, Pennsylvania, U.S.
- Batted: Right Threw: Right

MLB debut
- September 2, 1969, for the Kansas City Royals

Last MLB appearance
- October 2, 1969, for the Kansas City Royals

MLB statistics
- Batting average: .262
- Home runs: 1
- Runs batted in: 7
- Stats at Baseball Reference

Teams
- Kansas City Royals (1969)

Scott Richard Northey (born October 15, 1946) is an American former professional baseball player who appeared in 20 games played as a center fielder for the 1969 Kansas City Royals. The son of former MLB outfielder and coach Ron Northey, Scott was listed as 6 feet (1.8 m) tall and 170 pounds (77 kg). He threw and batted right-handed.

Northey was signed by the Chicago White Sox in 1965 as an amateur free agent. After his first pro season, he spent 1966–67 in military service during the Vietnam War era. Then, in 1968, he returned to the White Sox system and played 112 games at the Class A level before being selected by the Royals in the expansion draft. In 1969, the Royals' debut season, Northey batted .308 in 136 minor league games.

His MLB trial occurred in September when rosters expended from 25 to 40 players. In 20 games, 16 of them as the Royals' starting center fielder, Northey collected 16 hits, with two doubles, two triples, and one home run, a three-run blow struck on September 28 against the White Sox' Gary Peters. All told, Northey batted .262 with seven runs batted in in 61 MLB at bats. His career continued in the minor leagues from 1970 to 1972.

== See also ==
- List of second-generation Major League Baseball players
