= Steve Busby =

American baseball player (born 1949)

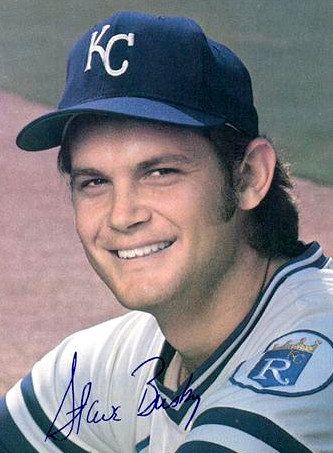
- Busby in 1980
- Pitcher
- Born: September 29, 1949 (age 76); Burbank, California, U.S.
- Batted: Right Threw: Right

MLB debut
- September 8, 1972, for the Kansas City Royals

Last MLB appearance
- August 26, 1980, for the Kansas City Royals

MLB statistics
- Win–loss record: 70–54
- Earned run average: 3.72
- Strikeouts: 659
- Stats at Baseball Reference

Teams
- Kansas City Royals (1972–1980)

Career highlights and awards
- 2× All-Star (1974, 1975); Pitched two no-hitters (1973, 1974); Kansas City Royals Hall of Fame

Steven Lee "Buzz" Busby (/ˈbʌzbi/ BUZ-bee; born September 29, 1949) is an American former professional baseball pitcher in Major League Baseball (MLB) who played his entire career for the Kansas City Royals. He batted and threw right-handed.

Busby threw the first two no-hitters in franchise history for the Royals.

== High school ==
Busby attended Fullerton Union High School in Fullerton, California.

== Professional career ==
A bright prospect, Busby won 56 games in his first three full seasons, only to have his career derailed by a rotator cuff tear. Drafted by the Royals in 1971 in the second round, the University of Southern California graduate made his major league debut the following season and stuck in the majors for good in 1973, when he won 16 games and on April 27 pitched the first no-hitter in Kansas City Royals history, defeating the Detroit Tigers at Tiger Stadium 3–0 on April 27. Busby became the first no-hit pitcher who did not come to bat during the entire game, with the American League having adopted the designated hitter rule that year.

Late in the 1972 season on September 20 against the California Angels, Busby hit a first-inning grand slam only to have it taken back by the first base umpire John Rice, who said time out had been called to eject Jerry May. Nonetheless, Busby went on to hit a double and two singles in the game, while also earning the victory on the mound.

In 1974, Busby enjoyed his best season, winning 22 games and making the American League All-Star team. He also pitched a second no-hitter on June 19, this one against the Milwaukee Brewers at County Stadium. Yielding only a second-inning walk to George Scott, Busby defeated the Brewers 2–0, besting Clyde Wright—himself a no-hit pitcher in 1970. With this no-hitter, Busby became the first pitcher in major-league history to throw no-hitters in each of his first two complete seasons. In 1975, he won 18 games and made the All-Star team again.

Busby had struggled with his control early in his career, but his problems returned to a greater degree in 1976 when he was diagnosed with a torn rotator cuff; an injury that at the time ended a pitcher's career. Busby subsequently became the first baseball player to undergo rotator cuff surgery. In an effort to help his arm recover from the surgery, his doctor recommended that Busby be placed on a pitch count. He is often believed to be the first baseball player to be placed on a pitch count, something that Busby has stated is a myth. Before his injury, he is alleged to have thrown close to 200 pitches in a game, which Busby also says is untrue.

The surgery did not save Busby's career. After missing the entire 1977 season and most of 1978, he pitched in 22 games (including 12 starts) the next year, compiling a respectable 6–6 record with a 3.63 ERA, but his walks outnumbered his strikeouts (64-to-45). In 1980, he even pitched a one-hitter, but otherwise pitched ineffectively, compiling a 6.17 ERA and allowing 80 baserunners in 42.1 innings. He pitched his final game on August 26 and the Royals released him three days later. Busby signed a contract with the St. Louis Cardinals before the 1981 season, but never pitched in the major leagues again.

In an eight-year career, Busby posted a 70–54 record with 659 strikeouts and a 3.72 ERA in 1060.2 innings.

Busby and outfielder Amos Otis were the first two players elected to the Royals Hall of Fame. In 2009, Busby was elected to the Missouri Sports Hall of Fame. His 70 career victories ranks him ninth on the Royals' all-time list.

== Broadcasting career ==
Following the end of his playing career, Busby became a sportscaster, primarily for the Texas Rangers, and has also worked as an instructor at a baseball school. Unlike most former players, Busby acts as both a play-by-play man and a color commentator, and traded positions with Eric Nadel on radio broadcasts. After replacing Dave Barnett as television play-by-play announcer in the middle of the 2012 season, Busby had been working exclusively on play-by-play, with Tom Grieve on color. However, in October 2016, the Rangers announced that Busby would not be returning for the 2017 season. Dave Raymond replaced Busby for the 2017 season.

Preceded by Bill Stoneman; Phil Niekro	No-hitter pitcher April 27, 1973; June 19, 1974	Succeeded by Nolan Ryan; Dick Bosman
