= Carl Taylor (baseball) =

American baseball player (born 1944)

- Catcher / Outfielder
- Born: January 20, 1944 (age 82); Sarasota, Florida, U.S.
- Batted: Right Threw: Right

MLB debut
- April 11, 1968, for the Pittsburgh Pirates

Last MLB appearance
- September 29, 1973, for the Kansas City Royals

MLB statistics
- Batting average: .266
- Home runs: 10
- Runs batted in: 115
- Stats at Baseball Reference

Teams
- Pittsburgh Pirates (1968–1969); St. Louis Cardinals (1970); Kansas City Royals (1971); Pittsburgh Pirates (1971); Kansas City Royals (1972–1973)

This is an article about a baseball player. For softball coach, see Carl C. Taylor.

Carl Means Taylor (born January 20, 1944) is an American former professional baseball player. He appeared in 411 Major League games as a catcher, outfielder, first baseman and pinch hitter from 1968 to 1973 for the Pittsburgh Pirates, St. Louis Cardinals and Kansas City Royals. He threw and batted right-handed, stood 6 feet 2 inches (1.88 m) tall, weighed 200 pounds (91 kg), and is the stepbrother of longtime Baltimore Orioles star first baseman Boog Powell.

Taylor batted under .250 for four of his six Major League seasons. But in 1969, he bested his career season high by 83 points, with a .348 batting average as a utility player for the Pirates. The Bucs then shipped him to the Cardinals in an offseason trade — although they would reacquire Taylor in September 1971 for their pennant drive. He was not eligible to play in the 1971 World Series, won by Pittsburgh in seven games over Powell's Orioles.

Overall, Taylor batted .266 in 846 Major League at bats; his 225 hits included 31 doubles and ten triples.

== See also ==
- List of Major League Baseball ultimate grand slams
