= Billy Harris (baseball) =

American baseball player (1943–2020)

- Second baseman/Third baseman
- Born: November 24, 1943; Hamlet, North Carolina, U.S.
- Died: December 20, 2020 (aged 77); Hampstead, North Carolina, U.S.
- Batted: Left Threw: Right

MLB debut
- June 16, 1968, for the Cleveland Indians

Last MLB appearance
- September 26, 1969, for the Kansas City Royals

MLB statistics
- Batting average: .218
- Home runs: 0
- Runs batted in: 3
- Stats at Baseball Reference

Teams
- Cleveland Indians (1968); Kansas City Royals (1969)

James William Harris (November 24, 1943 – December 20, 2020) was a Major League Baseball second baseman who played for two seasons. He played for the Cleveland Indians in 1968 and the Kansas City Royals in 1969.

He died on December 20, 2020, at his home in Hampstead, NC.
