= Luis Alcaraz =

Puerto Rican baseball player (born 1941)

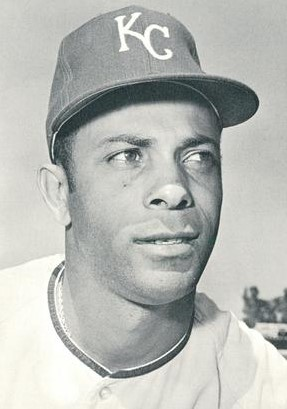
- Second baseman
- Born: June 20, 1941 (age 85); Humacao, Puerto Rico
- Batted: Right Threw: Right

MLB debut
- September 13, 1967, for the Los Angeles Dodgers

Last MLB appearance
- June 7, 1970, for the Kansas City Royals

MLB statistics
- Batting average: .192
- Hits: 70
- Home runs: 4
- RsBI: 29
- Stats at Baseball Reference

Teams
- Los Angeles Dodgers (1967–1968); Kansas City Royals (1969–1970)

Ángel Luis Alcaraz Acosta (born June 20, 1941) is a Puerto Rican former professional second baseman. Alcaraz was signed as a free agent by the Milwaukee Braves of Major League Baseball (MLB) on January 1, 1959 and then traded to the Los Angeles Dodgers before the 1960 season. He spent several seasons in the minor leagues before making his Major League debut on September 13, 1967 for the Dodgers against the San Francisco Giants.

After two seasons in Los Angeles, he was purchased from the Dodgers by the Kansas City Royals on October 21, 1968. He played for the Royals for two more seasons and then was traded by the Royals to the Chicago White Sox on March 30, 1971 for Bobby Knoop.

== See also ==
- List of Major League Baseball players from Puerto Rico
