= Paul Schaal =

American baseball player (1943–2017)

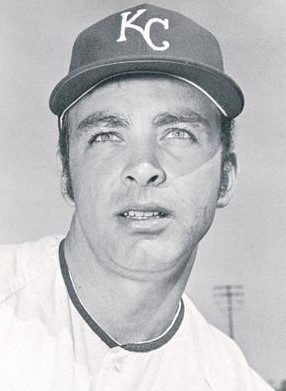
- Third baseman
- Born: March 3, 1943; Pittsburgh, Pennsylvania, U.S.
- Died: September 1, 2017 (aged 74); Waikoloa, Hawaii, U.S.
- Batted: Right Threw: Right

MLB debut
- September 3, 1964, for the Los Angeles Angels

Last MLB appearance
- July 19, 1974, for the California Angels

MLB statistics
- Batting average: .244
- Home runs: 57
- Runs batted in: 323
- Stats at Baseball Reference

Teams
- Los Angeles / California Angels (1964–1968); Kansas City Royals (1969–1974); California Angels (1974)

Paul Schaal (March 3, 1943 – September 1, 2017) was an American professional baseball player who played 11 seasons for the Los Angeles / California Angels and Kansas City Royals of Major League Baseball.

== Playing career ==
=== California Angels ===
Schaal became the Angels regular third baseman in his rookie season in 1965. He quickly established himself as a slick fielding but light hitting player. Schaal struggled at the plate, batting .224 in 1965 and .244 in 1966. When his average plummeted to .188 in 1967 and .210 in 1968, he platooned at third for the Angels with Aurelio Rodríguez, who was a better hitter.

On June 13, 1968, during a game at Fenway Park in Boston, Schaal was severely beaned above the left ear by a pitch from José Santiago of the Red Sox. The incident caused a one-inch skull fracture and a perforated eardrum, resulting in him remaining in the hospital until June 24. Despite returning briefly later in the season, Schaal experienced permanent hearing loss and balance issues that ultimately sidelined him for the rest of the year.

=== Kansas City Royals ===
After his subpar seasons in 1967 and 1968, the Angels left Schaal unprotected and he was selected by the Kansas City Royals in the expansion draft in October 1968. Schaal's career took off from there as he became the Royals' everyday third baseman, posting batting averages of .263 in 1969, .268 in 1970, and .274 in 1971 (when he also tallied his career high in home runs with 11). After slumping to .228 in 1972, Schaal rebounded with his career high .288 in 1973.

Schaal started slowly in 1974, batting only .176 in twelve games with the Royals. With future Hall of Famer George Brett ready to take over third base duties for Kansas City, the Royals traded Schaal back to the Angels for outfielder Richie Scheinblum. Schaal finished his career playing 53 games for the Angels, batting .248.

== Post-baseball life ==
After retiring from baseball, Schaal operated Paul Schaal's Pizza and Pub near 103rd and State Line Road in Kansas City. Although the business was successful, he grew dissatisfied with its impact on his lifestyle. Schaal was encouraged by a tennis partner and customer who suggested he consider chiropractic studies. Following this advice, Schaal enrolled at Cleveland Chiropractic College in Kansas City where he earned his Doctor of Chiropractic degree in 1978 and became a practicing chiropractor in the area.

== Personal life and death ==
Schaal had spondylolisthesis, a condition involving a permanent curvature of the fifth lumbar vertebrae. He began receiving chiropractic treatments at the age of 21 for the condition and stated he felt the treatment enabled him to extend his career in professional baseball and later influenced him to study chiropractic.

Schaal died from cancer on September 1, 2017 at age 74.
