= Mike Fiore (baseball, born 1944) =

American baseball player (born 1944)

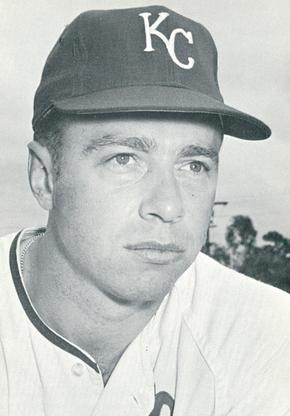
- First baseman / Outfielder
- Born: October 11, 1944 (age 81); Brooklyn, New York, U.S.
- Batted: Left Threw: Left

MLB debut
- September 21, 1968, for the Baltimore Orioles

Last MLB appearance
- July 2, 1972, for the San Diego Padres

MLB statistics
- Batting average: .227
- Home runs: 13
- Runs batted in: 50
- Stats at Baseball Reference

Teams
- Baltimore Orioles (1968); Kansas City Royals (1969–1970); Boston Red Sox (1970–1971); St. Louis Cardinals (1972); San Diego Padres (1972)

Michael Gary Joseph Fiore (born October 11, 1944) is an American former professional baseball first baseman. Mike was born in Brooklyn, New York and attended Lafayette High School. He was signed by the New York Mets before the 1963 season, drafted by the Baltimore Orioles from the Mets in the 1963 first-year draft (December 2), and later drafted by the Kansas City Royals from the Orioles as the 17th pick in the 1968 expansion draft. He played in Major League Baseball (MLB) for the Orioles (1968), Royals (1969–1970), Boston Red Sox (1970–1971), St. Louis Cardinals (1972), and San Diego Padres (1972).

Fiore hit the first home run in Kansas City Royals history. It took place at the Oakland–Alameda County Coliseum in their fifth game April 13, 1969. Fiore led off the top of the 2nd with a solo shot against Oakland Athletics All-Star John "Blue Moon" Odom.

His personal high for playing time was during the 1969 season, when he hit .274 with 12 HR and 35 RBI in 107 games. He finished his career with a lifetime batting average of .227, 13 HR, 50 RBI, and 75 runs scored in 254 ballgames.
