= Jim York (pitcher) =

American baseball player (born 1947)

- Pitcher
- Born: August 27, 1947 (age 77); Maywood, California, U.S.
- Batted: Right Threw: Right

MLB debut
- September 21, 1970, for the Kansas City Royals

Last MLB appearance
- August 5, 1976, for the New York Yankees

MLB statistics
- Win–loss record: 16-17
- Earned run average: 3.79
- Strikeouts: 194
- Stats at Baseball Reference

Teams
- Kansas City Royals (1970–1971); Houston Astros (1972–1975); New York Yankees (1976)

James Harlan York (born August 27, 1947) is an American former professional baseball pitcher. In his six-year Major League Baseball career, he played for the Kansas City Royals, the Houston Astros, and the New York Yankees.

== Amateur career ==
York graduated from Norwalk High School (California) in 1965 and then attended college at UCLA and played in the 1969 College World Series for the Bruins with Chris Chambliss.

== Professional career ==
In six years and 174 games, York posted a lifetime record of 16–17, 194 strikeouts and an ERA of 3.79. His best season statistically came with Kansas City in 1971, when he had career bests with 103 strikeouts, a 2.89 ERA, and a 5–5 record, and earned $12,500. As a batter, he got three hits in 40 at bats in his career. He hit one home run, also in the 1971 season, against Cleveland Indians pitcher Alan Foster. He was traded with Lance Clemons from the Royals to the Houston Astros for John Mayberry and minor league infielder Dave Grangaard at the Winter Meetings on December 2, 1971.

After being released by the Yankees in August 1976, York had a minor league stint with the Iowa Oaks in the Chicago White Sox organization. After not playing professionally in 1977, he retired in 1978.

His uniform numbers include 40, 42, and 43.
