= Bobby Knoop =

American baseball player (born 1938)

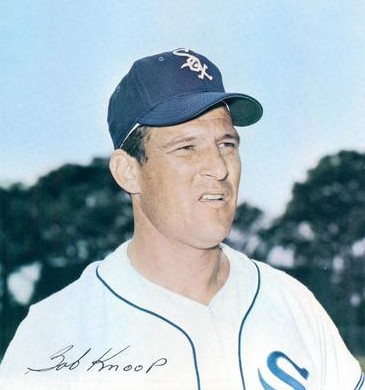
- Second baseman
- Born: October 18, 1938 (age 87); Sioux City, Iowa, U.S.
- Batted: Right Threw: Right

MLB debut
- April 13, 1964, for the Los Angeles Angels

Last MLB appearance
- September 20, 1972, for the Kansas City Royals

MLB statistics
- Batting average: .236
- Home runs: 56
- Runs batted in: 331
- Stats at Baseball Reference

Teams
- As player: Los Angeles / California Angels (1964–1969); Chicago White Sox (1969–1970); Kansas City Royals (1971–1972); As coach: Chicago White Sox (1977–1978); California Angels (1979–1996); Toronto Blue Jays (2000); Los Angeles Angels of Anaheim / Los Angeles Angels (2014–2018)

Career highlights and awards
- All-Star (1966); 3× Gold Glove Award (1966–1968); Angels Hall of Fame

Robert Frank Knoop (/kəˈnɒp/ kə-NOP; born October 18, 1938) is an American former Major League Baseball second baseman and coach. In his nine-year MLB career, he appeared in 1,153 games as a member of the Los Angeles / California Angels (1964–69), Chicago White Sox (1969–70) and Kansas City Royals (1971–72). He threw and batted right-handed, stood 6 feet 1 inch (1.85 m) tall and weighed 170 pounds (77 kg).

== Early life ==
Knoop was born on October 18, 1938, in Sioux City, Iowa to parents Frank and Mabel Knoop. His father was a German immigrant while his mother was a descendant of Swiss and Norwegian immigrants. Frank lived to be 101. The family moved to Montebello, California when he was young, and he attended Montebello High School, where he starred in baseball, football and basketball. He also played American Legion baseball.

== Baseball career ==
Knoop was signed by the Milwaukee Braves in 1956.

=== Minor league player ===
He played for ten different minor league teams between 1956 and 1963, his best year being in 1963 with the Hawaii Islanders of the Triple-A Pacific Coast League, where he had a .283 batting average, with 20 homeruns, 72 runs scored, 67 RBIs (runs batted in), and a .965 fielding percentage.

=== Major league player ===
Nicknamed "Nureyev" by sportswriters for his exciting and acrobatic fielding plays, Knoop played a deep second base, with exceptional range and a strong arm. In another version, Knoop says the nickname derived from not only his acrobatic skills at second base, but a fabricated story he told the writers that his mother had made him take ballet lessons.

In December 1963, the Los Angeles Angels obtained him via the Rule 5 draft, by the rules of which he was required to remain on the 1964 major-league roster. The Angels were already familiar with Knoop because the Islanders were their Triple-A affiliate, not Milwaukee's. The Angels were particularly impressed with his defensive ability, manager Bill Rigney considering Knoop as good defensively as any second baseman in the American League (AL), including Yankee second baseman Bobby Richardson (who won five consecutive AL Gold Glove awards at second base, 1961-65).

Knoop played in every game in 1964, and remained the Angels' regular second baseman for the next five and a half years (the name changing to California Angels in 1965), winning the club's MVP award four times in the span, a mark tied by Garret Anderson and Mike Trout. In 1966, he led all AL second basemen in fielding percentage (.981), with Richardson second (.980).

He turned the double play well along with shortstop Jim Fregosi, to give the Angels outstanding keystone defense. Fregosi was his roommate and closest friend in baseball, as well as a teammate. In 1967, the pair both won the Gold Glove award at their respective positions—the second of three Gold Gloves Knoop would capture from 1966 to 1968. He was the American League's starting second baseman in the 1966 Major League Baseball All-Star Game, and went hitless in two at bats. As a hitter, he had his best season during 1966, with career-highs of 17 home runs, 72 RBIs, 54 runs and 11 triples.

Knoop was sent to the White Sox in mid-1969 for Sandy Alomar Sr. and Bob Priddy and then was traded to the Royals in 1971, where he also rejoined former Angels third baseman Paul Schaal. Knoop played his final two years with Kansas City, mostly as a backup for Cookie Rojas.

In his career, Knoop batted .236, with 56 home runs, 331 RBIs, 337 runs, 856 hits, 129 doubles, 29 triples, and 16 stolen bases in 1153 games. In addition to leading all AL second baseman in fielding percentage in 1966, he was fifth in 1964, second in 1967, fourth in 1968 and 1969, and third in 1970. He is tied for the record of most double plays in a game by a second basemen, six, held with Alfonso Soriano and Bill Doran, which Knoop did on May 1, 1966. He is also tied for the record of most putouts in a game by a second baseman, twelve, being the most recent person to accomplish this on August 30, 1966 (through the 2024 season).

=== Coaching ===
After retiring, Knoop worked for over 40 years as a minor league and major league coach, scout and adviser, including stints with the Chicago White Sox (1977–78, assistant coach), California Angels (1979–96 as first base and third base coach), Toronto Blue Jays (2000, as first base coach) and Colorado Rockies (2008–12, 2008 as pro scout and 2009 as senior advisor for player development), and Los Angeles Angels (2014–18 as infield coach or infield instructor). In 1997 and 1998, he was head coach at Hampden-Sydney College in Virginia. In 1994, Knoop served as manager of the Angels for two games, posting a 1–1 record. In February 2019, Knoop retired from Major League Baseball, after a career that lasted 53 years.

=== Honors ===
He was inducted into the Angels Hall of Fame in 2013. Knoop was inducted into the Orange County, California Sports Hall of Fame in 1991.

== See also ==
- List of Major League Baseball annual triples leaders
- List of Gold Glove middle infield duos
