= Monty Montgomery (baseball) =

American baseball player (born 1946)

- Pitcher
- Born: September 1, 1946 (age 79); Albemarle, North Carolina
- Batted: Right Threw: Right

MLB debut
- September 14, 1971, for the Kansas City Royals

Last MLB appearance
- September 30, 1972, for the Kansas City Royals

MLB statistics
- Win–loss record: 6–3
- Earned run average: 2.78
- Innings pitched: 77 2/3
- Stats at Baseball Reference

Teams
- Kansas City Royals (1971–1972)

Monty Bryson Montgomery (born September 1, 1946) is an American former professional baseball right-handed pitcher, who played in Major League Baseball (MLB) for the Kansas City Royals, appearing in 12 games, in 1971 and 1972. During his playing days, he stood 6 feet 3 inches (1.91 m) tall, weighing 200 pounds (91 kg).

Montgomery was drafted by the Royals in the ninth round of the 1968 Major League Baseball draft out of Pfeiffer University. Recalled from the minor leagues by Kansas City in September 1971, he appeared in three games, two as a starting pitcher, in the season's final weeks — and won all three of them. In 1972, Montgomery started and finished the season in the big leagues, while playing most of the campaign for the Triple-A Omaha Royals. However, on September 7, 1972, he threw his only MLB complete game shutout, a four-hit, 6–0 blanking of the California Angels at Municipal Stadium.

Altogether, in Montgomery’s brief major league career, he logged 12 games (ten of them as a starter), and won six of nine decisions, allowing 71 hits, and 20 bases on balls, with 36 strikeouts, in 77 2/3 innings pitched.
