= Bill Butler (pitcher) =

American baseball player (born 1947)

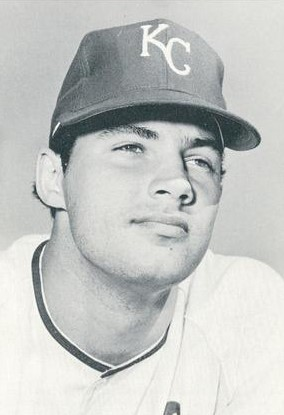
- Pitcher
- Born: March 12, 1947 (age 79); Hyattsville, Maryland, U.S.
- Batted: Left Threw: Left

MLB debut
- April 9, 1969, for the Kansas City Royals

Last MLB appearance
- July 11, 1977, for the Minnesota Twins

MLB statistics
- Win–loss record: 23–35
- Earned run average: 4.21
- Strikeouts: 408
- Stats at Baseball Reference

Teams
- Kansas City Royals (1969–1971); Cleveland Indians (1972); Minnesota Twins (1974–1975, 1977)

William Franklin Butler (born March 12, 1947) is an American former Major League Baseball pitcher who played for seven seasons. A left-hander, he pitched for the Kansas City Royals, Cleveland Indians, and the Minnesota Twins.
