= Dennis Paepke =

American baseball player (born 1945)

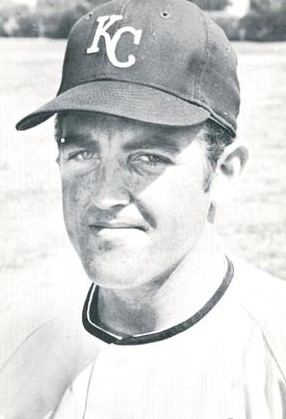
- Catcher
- Born: April 17, 1945; Long Beach, California, U.S.
- Died: 2021 (aged 75–76)
- Batted: Right Threw: Right

MLB debut
- June 2, 1969, for the Kansas City Royals

Last MLB appearance
- October 2, 1974, for the Kansas City Royals

MLB statistics
- Batting average: .183
- Hits: 36
- Home runs: 2
- Stats at Baseball Reference

Teams
- Kansas City Royals (1969, 1971–1972, 1974)

Dennis Ray Paepke (/ˈpæpkiː/ PAP-kee; born April 17, 1945 – 2021) was an American former professional baseball catcher who appeared in 80 games over all or part of four Major League Baseball seasons for the Kansas City Royals. He threw and batted right-handed, stood 6 feet (1.8 m) tall and weighed 202 pounds (92 kg).

Paepke was born in Long Beach, California, and graduated from Garden Grove's Rancho Alamitos High School in 1963. He had one of the highest batting averages in his high school's history, hitting over .700 during his senior year. After his graduation, he signed with the Los Angeles Angels, where his father, Jack, was the team's MLB bullpen coach. Dennis spent five full years in the Angel farm system until he was traded to the Royals, a first-year expansion team, in December 1968 along with catcher-outfielder Ed Kirkpatrick for Baseball Hall of Fame pitcher Hoyt Wilhelm. Paepke had a strong year offensively at Triple-A Omaha in 1969, and was recalled by the Royals for his first taste of MLB action in June. He batted only .111 in 27 at bats. After spending all of 1970 with Omaha, Paepke returned to Kansas City for 1971, getting into 60 games and belting his two career MLB home runs (off 20-game-winners and American League All-Stars Wilbur Wood and Mickey Lolich). But he hit only .204 with 31 total hits. He appear in only eight more big-league games, all for the Royals, in 1972 and 1974, with the rest of those years spent in Omaha.

In 1974, Paepke suffered a career-shortening injury when he was spiked by a player with sharpened cleats, tearing ligaments in his left arm. He retired after the 1975 minor-league season. In his 80 games and 197 at bats in the major leagues, he collected 36 total hits with seven doubles to go along with his two homers. He had 14 career runs batted in, and batted .183.
