= Ken Wright (baseball) =

American baseball player (1946-2017)

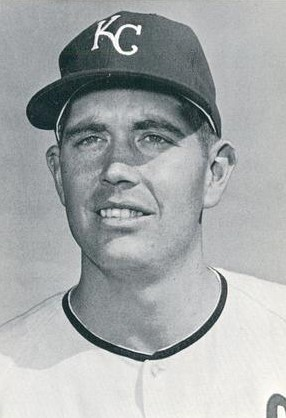
- Pitcher
- Born: September 4, 1946; Pensacola, Florida, U.S.
- Died: January 21, 2017 (aged 70); Pensacola, Florida, U.S.
- Batted: Right Threw: Right

MLB debut
- April 10, 1970, for the Kansas City Royals

Last MLB appearance
- April 28, 1974, for the New York Yankees

MLB statistics
- Win–loss record: 11–15
- Earned run average: 4.54
- Strikeouts: 181
- Stats at Baseball Reference

Teams
- Kansas City Royals (1970–1973); New York Yankees (1974)

Kenneth Warren Wright (September 4, 1946 – January 21, 2017) was a professional baseball pitcher. He played all or part of five seasons in Major League Baseball from 1970 to 1974 for the Kansas City Royals and New York Yankees.

After attending Escambia High School he was signed by the Boston Red Sox as an amateur free agent in 1964, Wright was selected from Boston in the rule 5 draft by the Kansas City Royals. He made his Major League Baseball debut with the Royals on April 10, 1970, and appeared in his final game on April 28, 1974, with the New York Yankees.

Wright died January 21, 2017.
