= Bob Oliver =

American baseball player (1943–2020)

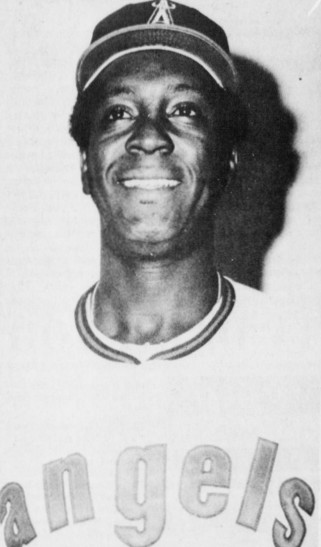
- First baseman / Outfielder / Third baseman
- Born: February 8, 1943; Shreveport, Louisiana, U.S.
- Died: April 19, 2020 (aged 77); Rio Linda, California, U.S.
- Batted: Right Threw: Right

MLB debut
- September 10, 1965, for the Pittsburgh Pirates

Last MLB appearance
- July 3, 1975, for the New York Yankees

MLB statistics
- Batting average: .256
- Home runs: 94
- Runs batted in: 419
- Stats at Baseball Reference

Teams
- Pittsburgh Pirates (1965); Kansas City Royals (1969–1972); California Angels (1972–1974); Baltimore Orioles (1974); New York Yankees (1975)

Robert Lee Oliver (February 8, 1943 – April 19, 2020) was an American professional baseball first baseman and outfielder, who played in Major League Baseball (MLB) for the Pittsburgh Pirates (1965), Kansas City Royals (1969–72), California Angels (1972–74), Baltimore Orioles (1974), and New York Yankees (1975). He batted and threw right-handed.

== Career ==
=== Minor leagues ===
Born in Shreveport, Louisiana, Oliver lettered in baseball and basketball at Highlands High School in North Highlands, California, a suburb of Sacramento. After graduating in 1961, he played college baseball at American River College, where he was heavily scouted. Signed by the Pittsburgh Pirates before the 1963 season, Oliver played in the Pirates' farm system for four seasons, with a late call-up in 1965, during which he made his major league debut. Oliver was traded to the Minnesota Twins and spent two more seasons in Minor League Baseball (MiLB).

=== Major leagues ===
Oliver made the big leagues for good in 1969, having been selected by the Kansas City Royals in the previous October's expansion draft. Playing on a young team that included fellow rookies Pat Kelly and Lou Piniella — the eventual American League (AL) Rookie of the Year — Oliver batted .254, with 13 home runs, and 43 runs batted in (RBI), in 118 games played. That year, he achieved two firsts in Royals history: 1) He was the first Royal to collect six hits in a nine-inning game (only two other Royals, Kevin Seitzer in 1987 and Joe Randa in 2004, have since accomplished this feat), with a 6-for-6 performance in a May 4 victory over the California Angels; and 2) He hit the Royals' first-ever grand slam, the shot coming off Jim Bouton in the first game of a July 4 doubleheader against the American League's other 1969 expansion team, the Seattle Pilots.

In 1970, Oliver established career highs in home runs (27), RBI (99), and runs scored (83). Oliver enjoyed two more solid seasons: 1972 (during which he was traded to the California Angels), batting .269, with 20 home runs, and 76 RBI; and 1973, batting .265, with 18 home runs, and 89 RBI, while splitting his time as a utility player. The Baltimore Orioles acquired him for the 1974 stretch drive; Oliver appeared in nine games for the team. His contract was purchased by the New York Yankees from the Orioles on December 1, 1974, but he only saw limited duty in 1975. During his career, Oliver batted .256, with 94 home runs, and 419 RBI, in 847 games played.

== Other interests and death ==
While a member of the California Angels, Oliver moonlighted as a police officer for the Santa Ana Police Department. In the offseason he was a school resource officer.

Oliver managed the Sacramento Steelheads, in 1999. He has also worked at two baseball schools in Sacramento County: operating his own Baseball Academy in Sacramento, as well as working as a hitting instructor at Dusty Baker's Baseball Camp in Rancho Cordova.

Oliver's son Darren also played in MLB, from 1993 to 2013. Both father and son are former teammates of Nolan Ryan: Bob from 1972 to 1974, and Darren as a rookie with the Texas Rangers in 1993 (Ryan's final major league season).

Oliver died on April 19, 2020, at the age of 77, in Rio Linda, California.

== See also ==
- List of Major League Baseball single-game hits leaders
