= Jim Rooker =

American baseball player (born 1942)

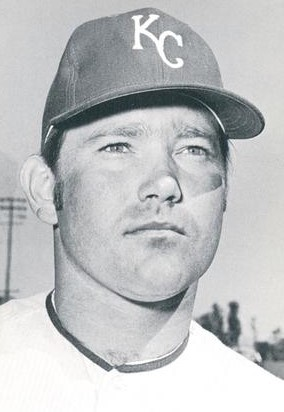
- Pitcher
- Born: September 23, 1942 (age 83); Lakeview, Oregon, U.S.
- Batted: Right Threw: Left

MLB debut
- June 30, 1968, for the Detroit Tigers

Last MLB appearance
- May 2, 1980, for the Pittsburgh Pirates

MLB statistics
- Win–loss record: 103–109
- Earned run average: 3.46
- Strikeouts: 976
- Stats at Baseball Reference

Teams
- Detroit Tigers (1968); Kansas City Royals (1969–1972); Pittsburgh Pirates (1973–1980)

Career highlights and awards
- World Series champion (1979)

James Phillip Rooker (born September 23, 1942) is an American former Major League Baseball pitcher and broadcaster.

A left-hander, Rooker pitched for the Detroit Tigers (1968), Kansas City Royals (1969–1973) and Pittsburgh Pirates (1974–1980).

== Early career ==
Signed as an amateur free agent by the Detroit Tigers, Rooker spent seven years in the Detroit farm system until he debuted in 1968, pitching 4 2/3 innings in two games in relief. After being selected by the Kansas City Royals in the October 1968 expansion draft he made the starting rotation. In 1969 he won only four games against 16 losses; however, in one of the losses, on July 7 against the Minnesota Twins, he became the first Royal to hit two home runs in one game. Both home runs were off Jim Kaat.

Rooker improved his record to 10–15 in 1970; one of the losses came in a 12-inning game against the New York Yankees on June 4 after Horace Clarke broke up Rooker's bid for a no-hitter leading off the ninth with a single then came around to score after a Bobby Murcer double. After winning only seven games against 13 losses over the next two seasons Rooker was traded to the Pittsburgh Pirates for Gene Garber.

== Pittsburgh Pirates ==
Rooker enjoyed his best seasons in Pittsburgh, posting a 10–6 record in 1973 and a 15–11 record with a 2.78 earned run average in 1974. The wins and ERA were a career best, as was his strikeout total (139). The Pirates won the National League East title the latter year, and Rooker pitched in Game 2 of the 1974 National League Championship Series against the Los Angeles Dodgers. He gave up two runs in seven innings but was not involved in the decision; the Dodgers won the game, then went on to win the series. In 1975 Rooker went 13–11 with a 2.97 ERA as the Pirates won the NL East title again; once again, however, the Pirates were defeated in the 1975 National League Championship Series, this time by the Cincinnati Reds. In game 2 of that series Rooker gave up four runs in as many innings, including a two-run home run to Tony Pérez in the first inning.

The Pirates did not win the NL East title in 1976 or 1977 (the Philadelphia Phillies won it in both seasons), but Rooker maintained his consistency during those two seasons, with a 15–8 and 14–9 record respectively. At the end of September in 1977, he broke his arm in a car accident. In 1978 he slumped to 9–11 and his ERA rose to 4.24—the highest it had been since 4.38 in 1972.

Rooker won the 1979 World Series with the Pirates. His career nearing the end, Rooker posted a 4–7 record in the regular season as a spot starter. Starting game 5 of the World Series with the Pirates trailing the Baltimore Orioles three games to one, Rooker gave up one run in five innings and left the game trailing by that 1–0 score. Pittsburgh rallied to score seven runs over the next three innings and got four shutout innings from Bert Blyleven to win the game 7–1, then won the next two games to take the Series.

In his career Rooker won 103 games against 109 losses, with 976 strikeouts and a 3.46 ERA in 1810 1/3 innings pitched.

A good hitting pitcher in his career, Rooker compiled a .201 batting average (122-for-606) with 54 runs, seven home runs and 56 RBI. In 1969 he hit four home runs for the Royals and in 1970 had 13 RBI. In 1974, he hit .305 (29-for-95) for the Pirates.

== "If we don't win, I'll walk back to Pittsburgh" ==
After his playing career, Rooker, well known for speaking his mind as a player, joined the Pirates’ radio and television broadcast team, with whom he worked as a color analyst from 1981 (one year after he retired) through 1993. He also worked for ESPN from 1994 to 1997.

Rooker's most famous moment as a broadcaster came on June 8, 1989, during a Pirates’ road game against the Philadelphia Phillies at Veterans Stadium. The Pirates scored 10 runs in the top of the first inning, including three on a Barry Bonds home run. As the Pirates' cross-state rivals came to bat in the bottom of the first, Rooker said on the air, "If we don't win this one, I don't think I'd want to be on that plane ride home. Matter of fact, if we lose this game, I'll walk back to Pittsburgh." Both Von Hayes and Steve Jeltz hit two home runs (the latter would hit only five during his Major League career) to trigger a Phillies comeback. In the eighth inning the Phillies, now trailing only 11–10, scored the tying run on a wild pitch, then took the lead on Darren Daulton's two-run single and went on to win 15–11. Rooker had to wait until after the season to make good on his "walk home" promise, conducting a 300-mile-plus (480 km) charity walk from Philadelphia to Pittsburgh. The entire event was documented by Jon Bois and Alex Rubenstein of Secret Base in 2022.

== Personal life ==
Rooker loves dogs and is an avid dog trainer.

Rooker went into politics after his baseball career. He ran for the Pennsylvania House of Representatives as well as the United States Congress, but lost both races.

Rooker writes children's literature. He has written three books with plots that combine reading and baseball. The books are titled Paul the Baseball, Matt the Batt, and Kitt the Mitt, and were published by Mascot Books in September 2009.
