= Joe Keough =

American baseball player (1946–2019)

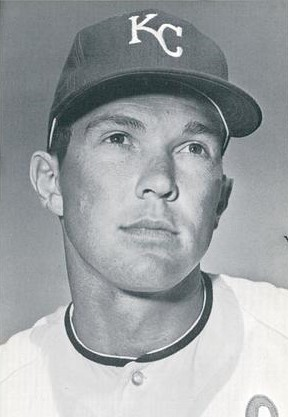
- Outfielder
- Born: January 7, 1946; Pomona, California, U.S.
- Died: September 9, 2019 (aged 73); Miami, Florida, U.S.
- Batted: Left Threw: Left

MLB debut
- August 7, 1968, for the Oakland Athletics

Last MLB appearance
- July 26, 1973, for the Chicago White Sox

MLB statistics
- Batting average: .246
- Home runs: 9
- Runs batted in: 81
- Stats at Baseball Reference

Teams
- Oakland Athletics (1968); Kansas City Royals (1969–1972); Chicago White Sox (1973)

Joseph William Keough (/ˈkiːoʊ/ KEE-oh; January 7, 1946 – September 9, 2019) was an American professional baseball player. He played in Major League Baseball as a right fielder from 1968 through 1973 for the Oakland Athletics, Kansas City Royals and the Chicago White Sox. Keough batted and threw left-handed, stood 6 feet (1.8 m) tall and weighed 185 pounds (84 kg). Coming from a baseball family, he was the younger brother of Marty Keough and uncle of Matt Keough. He was the Kansas City Athletics' second round selection in the first-ever MLB amateur draft in June 1965, chosen one round behind Rick Monday, but ahead of Sal Bando and Gene Tenace.

Keough was born in Pomona, California, and attended Mt. San Antonio College. He had a promising debut with the Oakland Athletics at Yankee Stadium on August 7, 1968, when he hit a home run off Lindy McDaniel in his first major league at bat. After being the fourth player selected by the Royals in the 1968 Major League Baseball expansion draft, he was on the Opening Day roster when Kansas City played its first game in April 1969. Keough delivered a pinch-hit single in the bottom of the 12th inning of the inaugural contest, giving KC a 4–3 victory over the Minnesota Twins.

The following year, he worked his way into the everyday lineup, compiling a .322 average by late June. A severely broken leg sustained on June 28 ended his 1970 season. He returned in 1971, posting career highs with 110 games played, 34 runs, 87 hits, 14 doubles, and 30 runs batted in.

He was traded in the winter of 1972 to the White Sox for outfielder Jim Lyttle and appeared in five games for Chicago in 1973.

In a six-season career, Keough was a .246 hitter with nine home runs and 81 RBI in 332 games. Defensively, he recorded a .983 fielding percentage playing at all three outfield positions and first base.

He died on September 9, 2019, in Miami, Florida

== See also ==
- Home run in first major league at bat
