= Denny Matthews =

American baseball sportscaster (born 1942)

- Born: November 14, 1942 (age 83); Jacksonville, Florida, U.S.
- Sports commentary career
- Team: Kansas City Royals (1969–present)
- Genre: Play-by-play
- Sport: Major League Baseball

Dennis Gardner Matthews (born November 14, 1942) is an American sportscaster, best known as a play-by-play announcer for Major League Baseball's Kansas City Royals since the team's inception in 1969.

== Early history ==
Matthews grew up in Bloomington, Illinois and attended Illinois Wesleyan University, where he played baseball and football, and belonged to the Sigma Chi fraternity. He worked for local radio and television stations in Peoria and St. Louis before his hiring by the Royals.

== Broadcast career ==
Matthews has broadcast for the Royals since their inception in 1969, when he was the sidekick to Bud Blattner. Blattner retired in 1975, and Matthews has been the Royals' top broadcaster since then. From 1974 to 1998 – a stretch that includes the best seasons in the Royals' history – Matthews was paired with Fred White. In 1999, the two also teamed up to write a book called Play by Play: 25 Years of Royals on Radio, which recounts anecdotes from those seasons. Matthews also called baseball events for the national CBS Radio network in the 1980s, including the World Series in both 1982 and 1985.

In 1999, the Royals fired White and replaced him with the younger Ryan Lefebvre. Despite a tremendous age difference, Matthews and Lefebvre integrated their styles well and their dry wit and rapport became popular with Royals fans.

In 2008, Matthews cut back on his broadcast schedule, traveling to fewer road games, turning many of those chores over to Bob Davis and Steve Stewart (who succeeded Lefebvre in the Royals' radio booth while the latter shifted to television). However, Matthews broadcast the first road trip of that season from Detroit and Minnesota while Davis was broadcasting the Kansas Jayhawks' run to the national basketball championship. Matthews handled most of the home schedule and much of the September slate, when Davis turned his attention to broadcasting Jayhawks football games. Steve Physioc replaced Davis on the Royals' broadcast team in 2012.

Matthews' broadcasts and longevity have made him a popular figure in Kansas City. Baseball historian and statistician Bill James is among his fans, and has written:

His voice has a pleasant timbre which suggests a cheerful occasion. His inflection varies naturally so it's neither falsely enthusiastic nor boring. He has a dry, understated humor that drifts through much of his audience undetected. One cannot learn these things at a microphone; they are given.

Since the retirement of the Los Angeles Dodgers' longtime English-language announcer Vin Scully and Spanish-language broadcaster Jaime Jarrín (who called that team's games from 1950–2016 and 1959–2022 respectively), Matthews' tenure with the Royals is the longest continuous tenure with one team among active Major League Baseball announcers. In January 2015, Matthews signed a contract extension which kept him calling Royals games through his and the team's 50th season in 2018. He signed a new contract in 2018 and continues to call games as of the 2026 season.

== Awards ==
Matthews was inducted into the Royals Hall of Fame in 2004 and the Missouri Sports Hall of Fame in 2005. He was presented with the Ford C. Frick Award by the National Baseball Hall of Fame in 2007.

== Personal life ==
On November 15, 2025, Matthews married his girlfriend of 17 years, Amy at Kauffman Stadium. The bride and groom wore Royals jerseys. The marriage is the first for both.

== Bibliography ==
- Denny Matthews, Fred White, and Matt Fulks (1999). Play by Play: 25 Years of Royals on Radio (ISBN 1-886110-78-6)

Preceded by None	Voice of the Royals; 1969 – Present	Succeeded by Incumbent
