= Ed Kirkpatrick =

American baseball player (1944–2010)

Ed "Spanky" Kirkpatrick
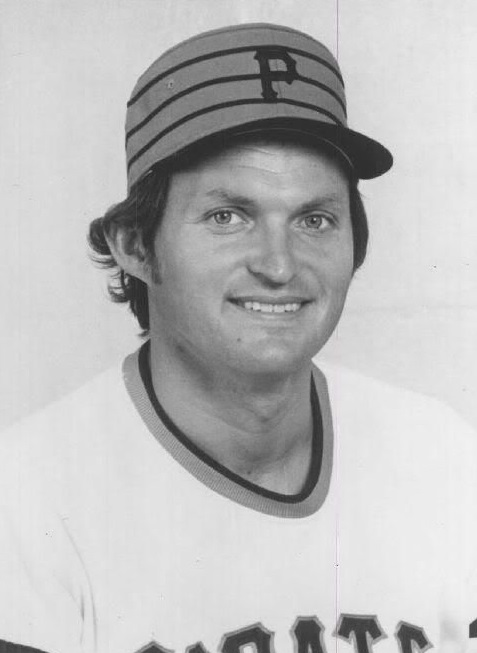
- Kirkpatrick in 1976
- Outfielder / Catcher
- Born: October 8, 1944; Spokane, Washington, U.S.
- Died: November 15, 2010 (aged 66); Mission Viejo, California, U.S.
- Batted: Left Threw: Right

MLB debut
- September 13, 1962, for the Los Angeles Angels

Last MLB appearance
- October 2, 1977, for the Milwaukee Brewers

MLB statistics
- Batting average: .238
- Home runs: 85
- Runs batted in: 424
- Stats at Baseball Reference

Teams
- Los Angeles / California Angels (1962–1968); Kansas City Royals (1969–1973); Pittsburgh Pirates (1974–1977); Texas Rangers (1977); Milwaukee Brewers (1977)

Edgar Leon Kirkpatrick (October 8, 1944 – November 15, 2010) was an American professional baseball outfielder and catcher. He played in Major League Baseball (MLB) from 1962 through 1977 for the Los Angeles / California Angels, Kansas City Royals, Pittsburgh Pirates, Texas Rangers, and Milwaukee Brewers.

Kirkpatrick helped the Pirates win the National League Eastern Division in the 1974 and 1975 seasons.

Over 16 seasons, he played in 1,311 games and had 3,467 at-bats, 411 runs, 824 hits, 143 doubles, 18 triples, 85 home runs, 424 RBI, 34 stolen bases, 456 walks, .238 batting average, .327 on-base percentage, .363 slugging percentage, 1,258 total bases, 25 sacrifice hits, 39 sacrifice flies, and 70 intentional walks.

Kirkpatrick recorded the final base hit (a single in the 8th inning) in the last game ever played at Municipal Stadium in Kansas City on October 4, 1972.

Kirkpatrick claimed the city of Glendora, California, where he graduated from high school, as his hometown. Glendora annually presents the Ed “Eddie" Kirkpatrick Award to a citizen who has done the most for local youth.

In 1981, Kirkpatrick was leaving a charity event in La Habra, California, when he was involved in a seemingly minor car accident; however, a blood clot traveled from a bruised area of his neck into his brain overnight. He suffered a heart attack during a subsequent brain surgery. He was in a coma for 5½ months and was left permanently paralyzed.

He died at the age of 66 in Mission Viejo, California, after a long battle with throat cancer.
