= 1971 Chicago White Sox season =

1971 Chicago White Sox
- League: American League
- Division: West
- Ballpark: Comiskey Park
- City: Chicago, Illinois
- Owners: Arthur Allyn, Jr. and John Allyn
- General managers: Stu Holcomb
- Managers: Chuck Tanner
- Television: WFLD (Jack Drees, Bud Kelly)
- Radio: WTAQ (AM), WEAW (Harry Caray, Ralph Faucher)

The 1971 Chicago White Sox season was their 72nd season overall and 71st in the American League. They finished with a record of 79–83.

== Offseason ==
- December 31, 1970: Chuck Hartenstein was purchased by the White Sox from the Boston Red Sox.
- March 29, 1971: Tommy McCraw was traded by the White Sox to the Washington Senators for Ed Stroud.
- March 31, 1971: Duane Josephson and Danny Murphy were traded by the White Sox to the Boston Red Sox for Tony Muser and Vicente Romo.

== Regular season ==
=== Season standings ===
AL West
Team	W	L	Pct.	GB	Home	Road
Oakland Athletics	101	60	.627	—	46‍–‍35	55‍–‍25
Kansas City Royals	85	76	.528	16	44‍–‍37	41‍–‍39
Chicago White Sox	79	83	.488	22½	39‍–‍42	40‍–‍41
California Angels	76	86	.469	25½	35‍–‍46	41‍–‍40
Minnesota Twins	74	86	.463	26½	37‍–‍42	37‍–‍44
Milwaukee Brewers	69	92	.429	32	34‍–‍48	35‍–‍44

=== Record vs. opponents ===
1971 American League record Sources:
Team	BAL	BOS	CAL	CWS	CLE	DET	KC	MIL	MIN	NYY	OAK	WAS
Baltimore	—	9–9	7–5	8–4	13–5	8–10	6–5	9–3	10–2	11–7	7–4	13–3
Boston	9–9	—	6–6	10–2	11–7	12–6	1–11	6–6	8–4	7–11	3–9	12–6
California	5–7	6–6	—	8–10	8–4	6–6	8–10	6–12	12–6	6–6	7–11	4–8
Chicago	4–8	2–10	10–8	—	3–9	7–5	9–9	11–7	7–11	5–7	11–7	10–2
Cleveland	5–13	7–11	4–8	9–3	—	6–12	2–10	4–8	4–8	8–10	4–8	7–11
Detroit	10–8	6–12	6–6	5–7	12–6	—	8–4	10–2	6–6	10–8	4–8	14–4
Kansas City	5–6	11–1	10–8	9–9	10–2	4–8	—	8–10	9–9	5–7	5–13	9–3
Milwaukee	3–9	6–6	12–6	7–11	8–4	2–10	10–8	—	10–7	2–10	3–15	6–6
Minnesota	2–10	4–8	6–12	11–7	8–4	6–6	9–9	7–10	—	8–4	8–10	5–6
New York	7–11	11–7	6–6	7–5	10–8	8–10	7–5	10–2	4–8	—	5–7	7–11
Oakland	4–7	9–3	11–7	7–11	8–4	8–4	13–5	15–3	10–8	7–5	—	9–3
Washington	3–13	6–12	8–4	2–10	11–7	4–14	3–9	6–6	6–5	11–7	3–9	—

=== Opening Day lineup ===
- Lee Richard, SS
- Jay Johnstone, CF
- Mike Andrews, 2B
- Bill Melton, 3B
- Carlos May, 1B
- Rick Reichardt, LF
- Walt Williams, RF
- Ed Herrmann, C
- Tommy John, P

=== Notable transactions ===
- June 8, 1971: 1971 Major League Baseball draft
  - Warren Cromartie was drafted by the White Sox in the 7th round, but did not sign.
  - Jeff Holly was drafted by the White Sox in the 17th round.
- July 7, 1971: Lee Maye was released by the White Sox.
- August 6, 1971: Joe Henderson was acquired by the White Sox from the Algodoneros de Union Laguna of the Mexican League.

=== Roster ===
1971 Chicago White Sox
Roster
Pitchers: 24 Tom Bradley; 32 Don Eddy; 51 Terry Forster; 44,50 Rich Hinton; 20 Joe Horlen; 44 Pat Jacquez; 25 Tommy John; 21,42 Bart Johnson; 23 Steve Kealey; 40 Jim Magnuson; 52 Dennis O'Toole; 46 Stan Perzanowski; 27 Vicente Romo; 28 Wilbur Wood	Catchers: 11 Chuck Brinkman; 8 Tom Egan; 12 Ed Herrmann; Infielders: 1 Luis Alvarado; 2 Mike Andrews; 19 Steve Huntz; 17 Carlos May; 26 Rich McKinney; 14 Bill Melton; 30 Rich Morales; 5 Tony Muser; 9 Lee Richard; 22 Bob Spence	Outfielders: 15 Mike Hershberger; 16 Ken Hottman; 10 Jay Johnstone; 18 Pat Kelly; 19 Ron Lolich; 19 Lee Maye; 48 Rick Reichardt; 6 Ed Stroud; 3 Walt Williams	Manager: 7 Chuck Tanner; Coaches: 4 Luke Appling; 37 Joe Lonnett; 35 Alex Monchak; 33 Johnny Sain

== Player stats ==
=== Batting ===
Note: G = Games played; AB = At bats; R = Runs scored; H = Hits; 2B = Doubles; 3B = Triples; HR = Home runs; RBI = Runs batted in; BB = Base on balls; SO = Strikeouts; AVG = Batting average; SB = Stolen bases

Player	G	AB	R	H	2B	3B	HR	RBI	BB	SO	AVG	SB
Luis Alvarado, SS, 2B	99	264	22	57	14	1	0	8	11	34	.216	1
Mike Andrews, 2B, 1B	109	330	45	93	16	0	12	47	67	36	.282	3
Chuck Brinkman, C	15	20	0	4	0	0	0	1	3	5	.200	0
Tom Egan, C	85	251	29	60	11	1	10	34	26	94	.239	1
Ed Herrmann, C	101	294	32	63	6	0	11	35	44	48	.214	2
Mike Hershberger, CF, RF	74	177	22	46	9	0	2	15	30	23	.260	6
Ken Hottman, LF	6	16	1	2	0	0	0	0	1	2	.125	0
Steve Huntz, 2B, SS, 3B	35	86	10	18	3	1	2	6	7	9	.209	1
Jay Johnstone, CF, RF, LF	124	388	53	101	14	1	16	40	38	50	.260	10
Pat Kelly, RF	67	213	32	62	6	3	3	22	36	29	.291	14
Ron Lolich, RF	2	8	0	1	1	0	0	0	0	2	.125	0
Carlos May, 1B, LF	141	500	64	147	21	7	7	70	62	61	.294	16
Lee Maye, RF, LF	32	44	6	9	2	0	1	7	5	7	.205	0
Rich McKinney, 2B, RF, 3B	114	369	35	100	11	2	8	46	35	37	.271	0
Bill Melton, 3B	150	543	72	146	18	2	33	86	61	87	.269	3
Rich Morales, SS, 3B, 2B	84	185	19	45	8	0	2	14	22	26	.243	2
Tony Muser, 1B	11	16	2	5	0	1	0	0	1	1	.313	0
Rick Reichardt, LF, CF, 1B	138	496	53	138	14	2	19	62	37	90	.278	5
Lee Richard, SS, CF	87	260	38	60	7	3	2	17	20	46	.231	8
Bob Spence, 1B	14	27	2	4	0	0	0	1	5	6	.148	0
Ed Stroud, OF	53	141	19	25	4	3	0	2	11	20	.177	4
Walt Williams, RF, LF	114	361	43	106	17	3	8	35	24	27	.294	5

Player	G	AB	R	H	2B	3B	HR	RBI	BB	SO	AVG	SB
Tom Bradley, P	48	96	6	15	0	0	1	6	1	32	.156	0
Don Eddy, P	22	1	0	1	1	0	0	0	0	0	1.000	0
Terry Forster, P	45	5	1	2	1	0	0	0	0	1	.400	0
Rich Hinton, P	18	1	1	0	0	0	0	0	0	0	.000	1
Joe Horlen, P	36	40	1	4	0	0	0	1	0	3	.100	0
Pat Jacquez, P	2	1	0	0	0	0	0	0	0	1	.000	0
Tommy John, P	38	69	3	10	0	0	0	2	3	14	.145	0
Bart Johnson, P	53	57	3	11	1	0	0	8	0	12	.193	0
Steve Kealey, P	54	10	1	2	0	0	1	3	0	4	.200	0
Jim Magnuson, P	15	4	0	0	0	0	0	0	0	3	.000	0
Stan Perzanowski, P	5	2	0	0	0	0	0	0	0	1	.000	0
Vicente Romo, P	45	11	1	4	0	0	0	0	1	2	.364	0
Wilbur Wood, P	44	96	1	5	0	0	0	0	11	57	.052	1
Team totals	162	5382	617	1346	185	30	138	568	562	870	.250	83

=== Pitching ===
Note: W = Wins; L = Losses; ERA = Earned run average; G = Games pitched; GS = Games started; SV = Saves; IP = Innings pitched; H = Hits allowed; R = Runs allowed; ER = Earned runs allowed; HR = Home runs allowed; BB = Walks allowed; K = Strikeouts

Player	W	L	ERA	G	GS	SV	IP	H	R	ER	HR	BB	K
Tom Bradley	15	15	2.96	45	39	2	285.2	273	111	94	16	79	206
Don Eddy	0	2	2.38	22	0	0	22.2	19	6	6	3	21	14
Terry Forster	2	3	3.99	45	3	1	49.2	46	23	22	5	26	48
Rich Hinton	3	4	4.44	18	2	0	24.1	27	12	12	1	7	15
Joe Horlen	8	9	4.26	34	18	2	137.1	150	72	65	12	32	82
Pat Jacquez	0	0	4.50	2	0	0	2.0	4	1	1	0	2	1
Tommy John	13	16	3.61	38	35	0	229.1	244	115	92	17	63	131
Bart Johnson	12	10	2.93	53	16	14	178.0	148	67	58	9	117	153
Steve Kealey	2	2	3.84	54	1	6	77.1	69	40	33	10	32	50
Jim Magnuson	1	1	4.50	15	4	0	30.0	30	18	15	0	16	11
Denny O'Toole	0	0	0.00	1	0	0	2.0	0	0	0	0	1	2
Stan Perzanowski	0	1	12.00	5	0	1	6.0	14	10	8	1	3	5
Vicente Romo	1	7	3.38	45	2	5	72.0	52	27	27	5	43	48
Wilbur Wood	22	13	1.91	44	42	1	334.0	272	95	71	21	64	210
Team totals	79	83	3.12	162	162	32	1450.1	1348	597	503	100	506	976

== Farm system ==
Level	Team	League	Manager
AAA	Tucson Toros	Pacific Coast League	Gordon Maltzberger
AA	Asheville Tourists	Southern League	Larry Sherry
A	Appleton Foxes	Midwest League	Joe Sparks
Rookie	GCL White Sox	Gulf Coast League	Joe Jones
