= 1970 Chicago White Sox season =

1970 Chicago White Sox
- League: American League
- Division: West
- Ballpark: White Sox Park
- City: Chicago
- Owners: John Allyn
- General managers: Ed Short
- Managers: Don Gutteridge, Bill Adair and Chuck Tanner
- Television: WFLD (Jack Drees, Billy Pierce)
- Radio: WMAQ (AM) (Bob Elson, Red Rush)

The 1970 Chicago White Sox season was the team's 70th season in the American League, and its 71st overall. They finished with a 56–106 record, their third-worst in 114 seasons of Major League Baseball^{[a]}, and finished in last position in the American League West, 42 wins behind the first-place Minnesota Twins.

Manager Don Gutteridge was fired September 1 with the team 49–87. Bill Adair served briefly as interim manager before Chuck Tanner, manager of the White Sox' Class AAA affiliate in Hawaii, came to the mainland to assume the position with the parent club. Tanner went 3–13 to close 1970 and remained skipper on the South Side through 1975.

The White Sox drew a paltry 495,355 fans to Comiskey Park, the lowest total in Major League Baseball.

In 1970, the White Sox hired organist Nancy Faust, who was a fixture at Comiskey and its successor, U.S. Cellular Field, for 40 years.

This was their last season of 100 losses or more until 2018, when they reached the century mark on the final day of the season.

== Offseason ==
- October 15, 1969: Woodie Held was released by the White Sox.
- December 18, 1969: Pete Ward was traded by the White Sox to the New York Yankees for Mickey Scott and cash.
- January 17, 1970: John Tamargo was drafted by the White Sox in the 4th round of the 1970 Major League Baseball draft (secondary phase), but did not sign.

== Regular season ==
=== Season standings ===
AL West
Team	W	L	Pct.	GB	Home	Road
Minnesota Twins	98	64	.605	—	51‍–‍30	47‍–‍34
Oakland Athletics	89	73	.549	9	49‍–‍32	40‍–‍41
California Angels	86	76	.531	12	43‍–‍38	43‍–‍38
Kansas City Royals	65	97	.401	33	35‍–‍44	30‍–‍53
Milwaukee Brewers	65	97	.401	33	38‍–‍42	27‍–‍55
Chicago White Sox	56	106	.346	42	31‍–‍53	25‍–‍53

=== Record vs. opponents ===
1970 American League record Sources:
Team	BAL	BOS	CAL	CWS	CLE	DET	KC	MIL	MIN	NYY	OAK	WAS
Baltimore	—	13–5	7–5	9–3	14–4	11–7	12–0	7–5	5–7	11–7	7–5	12–6
Boston	5–13	—	5–7	8–4	12–6	9–9	7–5	5–7	7–5	10–8	7–5	12–6
California	5–7	7–5	—	12–6	6–6	6–6	10–8	12–6	8–10	5–7	8–10	7–5
Chicago	3–9	4–8	6–12	—	6–6	6–6	7–11	7–11	6–12	5–7	2–16	4–8
Cleveland	4–14	6–12	6–6	6–6	—	7–11	8–4	7–5	6–6	8–10	7–5	11–7
Detroit	7–11	9–9	6–6	6–6	11–7	—	6–6	8–4	4–8	7–11	6–6	9–9
Kansas City	0–12	5–7	8–10	11–7	4–8	6–6	—	12–6	5–13	1–11	7–11	6–6
Milwaukee	5–7	7–5	6–12	11–7	5–7	4–8	6–12	—	5–13	3–9–1	8–10	5–7
Minnesota	7–5	5–7	10–8	12–6	6–6	8–4	13–5	13–5	—	5–7	13–5	6–6
New York	7–11	8–10	7–5	7–5	10–8	11–7	11–1	9–3–1	7–5	—	6–6	10–8
Oakland	5–7	5–7	10–8	16–2	5–7	6–6	11–7	10–8	5–13	6–6	—	10–2
Washington	6–12	6–12	5–7	8–4	7–11	9–9	6–6	7–5	6–6	8–10	2–10	—

=== Opening Day lineup ===
- Walt Williams, RF
- Luis Aparicio, SS
- Carlos May, LF
- Bill Melton, 3B
- John Matias, 1B
- Buddy Bradford, CF
- Syd O'Brien, 2B
- Duane Josephson, C
- Tommy John, P

=== Notable transactions ===
- June 4, 1970: 1970 Major League Baseball draft
  - Lee Richard was drafted by the White Sox in the 1st round (6th pick).
  - Goose Gossage was drafted by the White Sox in the 9th round.
- September 11, 1970: Lee Maye was selected off waivers by the White Sox from the Washington Senators.

=== Roster ===
1970 Chicago White Sox
Roster
Pitchers: 30 Gerry Arrigo; 44 Jerry Crider; 32 Don Eddy; 23 Steve Hamilton; 20 Joe Horlen; 26 Gerry Janeski; 25 Tommy John; 42 Bart Johnson; 40 Jim Magnuson; 23 Bob Miller; 48 Richie Moloney; 19 Barry Moore; 24 Danny Murphy; 52 Dennis O'Toole; 47 Gene Rounsaville; 27 Don Secrist; 23 Tommie Sisk; 45 Lee Stange; 41 Floyd Weaver; 28 Wilbur Wood; 46 Billy Wynne	Catchers: 10 Chuck Brinkman; 12 Ed Herrmann; 5 Duane Josephson; 30 Art Kusnyer; Infielders: 11 Luis Aparicio; 9 Ossie Blanco; 18 Gail Hopkins; 29 Bobby Knoop; 6 Tommy McCraw; 1 Rich McKinney; 2 Rich Morales; 7 Syd O'Brien; 22 Bob Spence	Outfielders: 16 Ken Berry; 19 Buddy Bradford; 15 Bob Christian; 8 John Matias; 17 Carlos May; 14 Bill Melton; 15 José Ortiz; 3 Walt Williams; Other batters: 21 Lee Maye	Manager: 34 Bill Adair; 39 Don Gutteridge; 31 Chuck Tanner; Coaches: 34 Bill Adair; 4 Luke Appling; 35 Les Moss; 33 Hugh Mulcahy

== Player stats ==
=== Batting ===
Note: G = Games played; AB = At bats; R = Runs scored; H = Hits; 2B = Doubles; 3B = Triples; HR = Home runs; RBI = Runs batted in; BB = Base on balls; SO = Strikeouts; AVG = Batting average; SB = Stolen bases

Player	G	AB	R	H	2B	3B	HR	RBI	BB	SO	AVG	SB
Luis Aparicio, SS	146	552	86	173	29	3	5	43	53	34	.313	8
Ken Berry, CF	141	436	45	128	12	2	7	50	43	61	.276	6
Ossie Blanco, 1B	34	66	4	13	0	0	0	8	3	14	.197	0
Buddy Bradford, CF, RF	32	91	8	17	3	0	2	8	10	30	.187	1
Chuck Brinkman, C	9	20	4	5	1	0	0	0	3	3	.250	0
Bob Christian, LF	12	15	3	4	0	0	1	3	1	4	.267	0
Ed Herrmann, C	96	297	42	84	9	0	19	52	31	41	.283	0
Gail Hopkins, 1B	116	287	32	82	8	1	6	29	28	19	.286	0
Duane Josephson, C	96	285	28	90	12	1	4	41	24	28	.316	0
Bobby Knoop, 2B	130	402	34	92	13	2	5	36	34	79	.229	0
Art Kusnyer, C	4	10	0	1	0	0	0	0	0	4	.100	0
Carlos May, LF, 1B	150	555	83	158	28	4	12	68	79	96	.285	12
Lee Maye, PH	6	6	0	1	0	0	0	1	0	1	.167	0
Rich McKinney, 3B, SS	43	119	12	20	5	0	4	17	11	25	.168	3
Bill Melton, 3B, RF	141	514	74	135	15	1	33	96	56	107	.263	2
John Matias, 1B, RF, LF	58	117	7	22	2	0	2	6	3	22	.188	1
Tommy McCraw, 1B, OF	129	332	39	73	11	2	6	31	21	50	.220	12
Rich Morales, SS, 3B, 2B	62	112	6	18	2	0	1	2	9	16	.161	1
Syd O'Brien, 3B, 2B, SS	121	441	48	109	13	2	8	44	22	62	.247	3
José Ortiz, OF	15	24	4	8	1	0	0	1	2	2	.333	1
Bob Spence, 1B	46	130	11	29	4	1	4	15	11	32	.223	0
Walt Williams, RF, LF, CF	110	315	43	79	18	1	3	15	19	30	.251	3

Player	G	AB	R	H	2B	3B	HR	RBI	BB	SO	AVG	SB
Gerry Arrigo, P	5	4	0	0	0	0	0	0	0	2	.000	0
Jerry Crider, P	32	24	2	2	1	0	0	0	0	5	.083	0
Joe Horlen, P	28	52	2	6	1	0	0	1	2	14	.115	0
Gerry Janeski, P	35	66	0	5	0	0	0	5	2	31	.076	0
Tommy John, P	38	84	4	17	1	0	0	5	2	17	.202	0
Bart Johnson, P	18	29	3	8	2	0	0	2	1	6	.276	0
Jim Magnuson, P	13	11	1	0	0	0	0	0	0	3	.000	0
Bob Miller, P	16	23	0	4	0	0	0	2	3	5	.174	0
Barry Moore, P	24	19	2	5	0	0	0	2	1	4	.263	0
Danny Murphy, P	51	6	3	2	0	0	1	1	2	2	.333	0
Tommie Sisk, P	17	4	0	1	0	0	0	0	0	2	.250	0
Lee Stange, P	16	1	0	0	0	0	0	0	0	1	.000	0
Floyd Weaver, P	31	7	1	0	0	0	0	0	0	2	.000	0
Wilbur Wood, P	77	18	2	2	1	0	0	3	0	11	.111	0
Billy Wynne, P	12	13	0	1	0	0	0	0	1	7	.077	0
Team totals	162	5514	633	1394	192	20	123	587	477	872	.253	53

=== Pitching ===
Note: W = Wins; L = Losses; ERA = Earned run average; G = Games pitched; GS = Games started; SV = Saves; IP = Innings pitched; H = Hits allowed; R = Runs allowed; ER = Earned runs allowed; HR = Home runs allowed; BB = Walks allowed; K = Strikeouts

Player	W	L	ERA	G	GS	SV	IP	H	R	ER	HR	BB	K
Gerry Arrigo	0	3	12.83	5	3	0	13.1	24	20	19	4	10	12
Jerry Crider	4	7	4.45	32	8	4	91.0	101	49	45	13	36	40
Don Eddy	0	0	2.31	7	0	0	11.2	10	4	3	0	6	9
Steve Hamilton	0	0	6.00	3	0	0	3.0	4	2	2	0	1	3
Joe Horlen	6	16	4.86	28	26	0	172.1	198	99	93	18	45	77
Gerry Janeski	10	17	4.77	35	35	0	205.2	247	125	109	22	73	79
Tommy John	12	17	3.27	37	37	0	269.1	253	117	98	19	117	138
Bart Johnson	4	7	3.82	18	15	0	89.2	92	53	48	11	48	71
Jim Magnuson	1	5	4.84	13	6	0	44.2	45	28	24	7	17	20
Bob Miller	4	6	5.01	15	12	0	70.0	88	42	39	11	36	36
Richie Moloney	0	0	0.00	1	0	0	1.0	2	0	0	0	0	1
Barry Moore	0	4	6.37	24	7	0	70.2	85	56	50	12	34	34
Danny Murphy	2	3	5.69	51	0	5	80.2	82	55	51	11	57	42
Denny O'Toole	0	0	2.70	3	0	0	3.1	5	1	1	0	2	3
Gene Rounsaville	0	1	9.95	8	0	0	6.1	10	8	7	1	2	3
Don Secrist	0	0	5.52	9	0	0	14.2	19	9	9	2	12	9
Tommie Sisk	1	1	5.40	17	1	0	33.1	37	28	20	6	18	16
Lee Stange	1	0	5.24	16	0	0	22.1	28	13	13	5	6	14
Floyd Weaver	1	2	4.38	31	3	0	61.2	52	33	30	7	36	51
Wilbur Wood	9	13	2.81	77	0	21	121.2	118	50	38	7	43	85
Billy Wynne	1	4	5.32	12	9	0	44.0	54	30	26	8	24	19
Team totals	56	106	4.54	162	162	30	1430.1	1554	822	722	164	623	762

== Farm system ==
Level	Team	League	Manager
AAA	Tucson Toros	Pacific Coast League	Gordon Maltzberger
AA	Mobile White Sox	Southern League	Tom Saffell and Larry Sherry
A	Appleton Foxes	Midwest League	Ira Hutchinson
A-Short Season	Duluth–Superior Dukes	Northern League	Joe Sparks
Rookie	GCL White Sox	Gulf Coast League	Joe Jones

LEAGUE CHAMPIONS: Duluth-Superior, GCL White Sox

== Notes ==
^{a} The White Sox' only worse records have been 49 wins against 102 losses in 1932, and 51 wins against 101 losses in 1948.
