= 1971 California Angels season =

Major League Baseball season

1971 California Angels
- League: American League
- Division: West
- Ballpark: Anaheim Stadium
- City: Anaheim, California
- Record: 76–86 (.469)
- Divisional place: 4th
- Owner: Gene Autry
- General manager: Dick Walsh
- Manager: Lefty Phillips
- Television: KTLA
- Radio: KMPC (Dick Enberg, Don Wells, Dave Niehaus, Jerry Coleman)
- Stats: ESPN.com; Baseball Reference

The 1971 California Angels season was the 11th season of the Angels franchise in the American League, the 6th in Anaheim, and their 6th season playing their home games at Anaheim Stadium. The Angels finished the season fourth in the American League West with a record of 76 wins and 86 losses.

== Regular season ==
=== Season standings ===
AL West
Team	W	L	Pct.	GB	Home	Road
Oakland Athletics	101	60	.627	—	46‍–‍35	55‍–‍25
Kansas City Royals	85	76	.528	16	44‍–‍37	41‍–‍39
Chicago White Sox	79	83	.488	22½	39‍–‍42	40‍–‍41
California Angels	76	86	.469	25½	35‍–‍46	41‍–‍40
Minnesota Twins	74	86	.463	26½	37‍–‍42	37‍–‍44
Milwaukee Brewers	69	92	.429	32	34‍–‍48	35‍–‍44

=== Record vs. opponents ===
1971 American League record Sources:
Team	BAL	BOS	CAL	CWS	CLE	DET	KC	MIL	MIN	NYY	OAK	WAS
Baltimore	—	9–9	7–5	8–4	13–5	8–10	6–5	9–3	10–2	11–7	7–4	13–3
Boston	9–9	—	6–6	10–2	11–7	12–6	1–11	6–6	8–4	7–11	3–9	12–6
California	5–7	6–6	—	8–10	8–4	6–6	8–10	6–12	12–6	6–6	7–11	4–8
Chicago	4–8	2–10	10–8	—	3–9	7–5	9–9	11–7	7–11	5–7	11–7	10–2
Cleveland	5–13	7–11	4–8	9–3	—	6–12	2–10	4–8	4–8	8–10	4–8	7–11
Detroit	10–8	6–12	6–6	5–7	12–6	—	8–4	10–2	6–6	10–8	4–8	14–4
Kansas City	5–6	11–1	10–8	9–9	10–2	4–8	—	8–10	9–9	5–7	5–13	9–3
Milwaukee	3–9	6–6	12–6	7–11	8–4	2–10	10–8	—	10–7	2–10	3–15	6–6
Minnesota	2–10	4–8	6–12	11–7	8–4	6–6	9–9	7–10	—	8–4	8–10	5–6
New York	7–11	11–7	6–6	7–5	10–8	8–10	7–5	10–2	4–8	—	5–7	7–11
Oakland	4–7	9–3	11–7	7–11	8–4	8–4	13–5	15–3	10–8	7–5	—	9–3
Washington	3–13	6–12	8–4	2–10	11–7	4–14	3–9	6–6	6–5	11–7	3–9	—

=== Opening Day starters ===
- Sandy Alomar Sr.
- Ken Berry
- Tony Conigliaro
- Jim Fregosi
- Alex Johnson
- Ken McMullen
- Jerry Moses
- Jim Spencer
- Clyde Wright

=== Notable transactions ===
- April 4, 1971: Joe Henderson was released by the Angels.

==== Draft picks ====
- June 8, 1971: 1971 Major League Baseball draft
  - Ron Jackson was drafted by the Angels in the 2nd round.
  - Billy Smith was drafted by the Angels in the 3rd round.

=== Roster ===
1971 California Angels
Roster
Pitchers: 40 Lloyd Allen; 44 Rickey Clark; 24 Eddie Fisher; 42 Andy Hassler; 16 Dave LaRoche; 30 Fred Lasher; 43 Jim Maloney; 34 Rudy May; 47 Andy Messersmith; 41 Tom Murphy; 46 Mel Queen; 35 Archie Reynolds; 38 Clyde Wright; 45 Billy Wynne	Catchers: 39 Art Kusnyer; 10,19 Jerry Moses; 37 John Stephenson; 3 Jeff Torborg; Infielders: 1,2 Sandy Alomar Sr.; 1 Bruce Christensen; 11 Jim Fregosi; 7 Ken McMullen; 8 Syd O'Brien; 18 Billy Parker; 15 Chico Ruiz; 9 Jim Spencer	Outfielders: 12 Ken Berry; 4 Tony Conigliaro; 14 Billy Cowan; 25 Tony González; 17 Alex Johnson; 6 Roger Repoz; 19 Tommie Reynolds; 5 Mickey Rivers; 33 Tom Silverio; Other batters: 15 Rudy Meoli	Manager: 36 Lefty Phillips; Coaches: 22 Rocky Bridges; 20 Fred Koenig; 27 Pete Reiser; 21 Norm Sherry

== Player stats ==
=== Batting ===
==== Starters by position ====
Note: Pos = Position; G = Games played; AB = At bats; H = Hits; Avg. = Batting average; HR = Home runs; RBI = Runs batted in

Pos	Player	G	AB	H	Avg.	HR	RBI
C	John Stephenson	98	279	61	.219	3	25
1B	Jim Spencer	148	510	121	.237	18	59
2B	Sandy Alomar Sr.	162	689	179	.260	4	42
SS	Jim Fregosi	107	347	81	.233	5	33
3B	Ken McMullen	160	593	148	.250	21	68
LF	Tony González	111	314	77	.245	3	38
CF	Ken Berry	111	298	66	.221	3	22
RF	Tony Conigliaro	74	266	59	.222	4	15

==== Other batters ====
Note: G = Games played; AB = At bats; H = Hits; Avg. = Batting average; HR = Home runs; RBI = Runs batted in

Player	G	AB	H	Avg.	HR	RBI
Roger Repoz	113	297	59	.199	13	41
Mickey Rivers	79	268	71	.265	1	12
Syd O'Brien	90	251	50	.199	5	21
Alex Johnson	65	242	63	.260	2	21
Jerry Moses	69	181	41	.227	4	15
Billy Cowan	74	174	48	.276	4	20
Jeff Torborg	55	123	25	.203	0	5
Tommie Reynolds	45	86	16	.186	2	8
Billy Parker	20	70	16	.229	1	6
Bruce Christensen	29	63	17	.270	0	3
Chico Ruiz	31	19	5	.263	0	0
Art Kusnyer	6	13	2	.154	0	0
Rudy Meoli	7	3	0	.000	0	0
Tom Silverio	3	3	1	.333	0	0

=== Pitching ===
==== Starting pitchers ====
Note: G = Games pitched; IP = Innings pitched; W = Wins; L = Losses; ERA = Earned run average; SO = Strikeouts

Player	G	IP	W	L	ERA	SO
Andy Messersmith	38	276.2	20	13	2.99	179
Clyde Wright	37	276.2	16	17	2.99	135
Tom Murphy	37	243.1	6	17	3.77	89
Rudy May	32	208.1	11	12	3.02	156

==== Other pitchers ====
Note: G = Games pitched; IP = Innings pitched; W = Wins; L = Losses; ERA = Earned run average; SO = Strikeouts

Player	G	IP	W	L	ERA	SO
Rickey Clark	11	44.0	2	1	2.86	28
Jim Maloney	13	30.1	0	3	5.04	13
Andy Hassler	6	18.2	0	3	3.86	13

==== Relief pitchers ====
Note: G = Games pitched; W = Wins; L = Losses; SV = Saves; ERA = Earned run average; SO = Strikeouts

Player	G	W	L	SV	ERA	SO
Lloyd Allen	54	4	6	15	2.49	72
Eddie Fisher	57	10	8	3	2.72	82
Dave LaRoche	56	5	1	9	2.50	63
Mel Queen	44	2	2	4	1.78	53
Archie Reynolds	15	0	3	0	4.61	15
Billy Wynne	3	0	0	0	4.91	6
Fred Lasher	2	0	0	0	27.00	0

== Farm system ==
Level	Team	League	Manager
AAA	Salt Lake City Angels	Pacific Coast League	Del Rice
AA	Shreveport Captains	Texas League	Les Moss
A	Quad Cities Angels	Midwest League	Mike Stubbins
Rookie	Idaho Falls Angels	Pioneer League	Bob Clear

LEAGUE CHAMPIONS: Salt Lake City, Quad Cities

Records
Preceded by 1970	California Angels seasons 1971	Succeeded by 1972
