= Lolich =

Lolich is a surname. Notable people with the surname include:

- Mickey Lolich (1940–2026), American baseball player
- Ron Lolich (born 1946), American baseball player
