= Pat Kelly (outfielder) =

American baseball player (1944–2005)

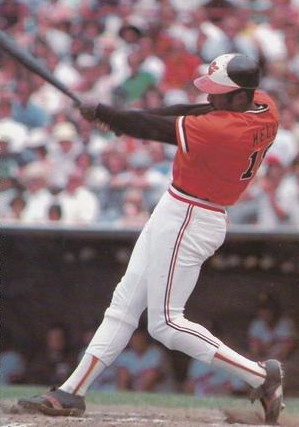
- Kelly at bat in 1977
- Outfielder
- Born: July 30, 1944; Philadelphia, Pennsylvania, U.S.
- Died: October 2, 2005 (aged 61); Chambersburg, Pennsylvania, U.S.
- Batted: Left Threw: Left

MLB debut
- September 6, 1967, for the Minnesota Twins

Last MLB appearance
- October 4, 1981, for the Cleveland Indians

MLB statistics
- Batting average: .264
- Home runs: 76
- Runs batted in: 418
- Stats at Baseball Reference

Teams
- Minnesota Twins (1967–1968); Kansas City Royals (1969–1970); Chicago White Sox (1971–1976); Baltimore Orioles (1977–1980); Cleveland Indians (1981)

Career highlights and awards
- All-Star (1973)

Harold Patrick Kelly (July 30, 1944 – October 2, 2005) was an American professional baseball outfielder. He played in Major League Baseball (MLB) from 1967 to 1981 with the Minnesota Twins, Kansas City Royals, Chicago White Sox, Baltimore Orioles and the Cleveland Indians. He batted and threw left-handed. His brother, Leroy, was a Pro Football Hall of Fame running back.

Born and raised in Philadelphia, Pennsylvania, Kelly was an "All Public" baseball player at Simon Gratz High School, honored with the Cliveden Award as Philadelphia's finest prep school athlete in 1962. Signed by the Twins that year, he spent the next several seasons in the minor leagues, debuting with the Twins in 1967. He played a handful of games for them in 1968, then was selected in the 1968 Major League Baseball expansion draft by the Royals, becoming an everyday player over the next two years with the fledgling franchise. Traded to the White Sox before the 1971 season, he spent part of 1971 in the minor leagues but got more playing time as a right fielder and designated hitter in the following years, reaching the All-Star Game for the only time in his career in 1973. Traded to the Orioles after the 1976 season, he received significant playing time in left field in 1977 and 1978, then served as a bench player the next two years. With a career-high .536 slugging percentage in 1979, Kelly helped the Orioles reach the MLB playoffs, appearing in the World Series, which Baltimore lost to the Pittsburgh Pirates in seven games. After one last season with the Indians in 1981, Kelly retired.

After becoming a born-again Christian in 1975, Kelly became very involved in Christian ministry. Under his influence, several of his Oriole teammates became Christians. Following his career, he became an ordained minister, serving at ministries in Baltimore and Cleveland until his death of a heart attack in 2005.

== Early life ==
Harold Patrick Kelly was born on July 30, 1944, in Philadelphia, Pennsylvania, to parents Orvin and Argie Kelly. His parents had originally lived in South Carolina, but they had moved to the Nicetown neighborhood of northern Philadelphia in the 1920s, when Orvin was hired by a steel company. Pat was one of nine children, though he never met two of his siblings who died in 1940 because of rheumatic fever. He recalled, "My father worked for $12 a week to serve nine kids and put food on the table. He would wake up at four in the morning and it would be freezing cold outside. He would go in a pickup truck with no heat some 30 miles and work all day, but he went with God in his heart."

A faithful Baptist family, the Kellys attended Sunday school each week. They were also an athletic family; Leroy, Pat's older brother by two years and the closest in age to him, succeeded Jim Brown as the Cleveland Browns primary running back and was eventually inducted into the Pro Football Hall of Fame. Pat and Leroy competed all the time, which Pat credited for helping instill in him a competitive nature. He went to baseball games at Connie Mack Stadium growing up, and his favorite ballplayer was Jackie Robinson.

Kelly attended Simon Gratz High School, graduating in 1962. He was part of the "All Public" teams in both baseball and football. As a senior, he was honored with the Cliveden Award, presented to the finest Philadelphia prep school athlete. Though he would be an outfielder in the major leagues, Kelly was used as a pitcher in high school. After allowing home runs, he would often display a bad attitude, but the reprimands of coach Pete Lorenc eventually helped him overcome the habit. "When you played for him, the first thing you learned was discipline," Kelly said, observing its importance both in hitting and keeping a good attitude.

== Minor leagues (1963–66) ==
On September 11, 1962, Kelly signed his first professional baseball contract with the Minnesota Twins, who decided to use him as an outfielder. He split the 1963 season with the Erie Sailors of the Class A New York-Penn League and the Orlando Twins of the Class A Florida State League. Having grown up in Philadelphia, Kelly, who was black, was unused to dealing with segregation. At Orlando, though, he and his black teammates had to stay at a different hotel from the white players on the team. "I know those times were hard, but what always kept me going was what Jackie Robinson went through," he later recalled. In 69 games with Erie, he batted .283 with 50 runs scored, 70 hits, four home runs, and 30 runs batted in (RBI). With Orlando in 49 games, he batted .242 with 27 runs scored, 28 hits, no home runs, and 26 RBI.

Kelly spent most of 1964 with the Wisconsin Rapids Twins of the Class A Midwest League. In 104 games, he ranked among the league leaders with a .357 batting average (third, behind Dave May's .368 and Ed Moxey's .362), 138 hits (third, behind May's 166 and John Matias's 151), 26 doubles (tied with May, Eusebio Rosas, and David Burge for the league lead), 16 home runs (third, behind Rene Lachemann's 24 and Chuck Gross's 18), and 70 RBI (eighth). He also played 18 games with the Wilson Tobs of the Class A Carolina League, batting .245 with eight runs scored, 12 hits, no home runs, and eight RBI.

In 1965, Kelly spent the whole season with Wilson. He played 144 games, batting .283 with 138 hits, four home runs, and 52 RBI. Kelly ranked fifth in the league with 27 stolen bases (in 32 attempts), and his 101 runs scored were topped only by Sam Thompson's 121.

Kelly expected a promotion to the Class AA Charlotte Hornets of the Southern League in 1966; thus, he was very disappointed when he found out the Twins planned to send him back to Wilson. "When I found out I didn’t make the Charlotte team, I packed up my Pontiac LeMans and told them I was leaving camp if they did not put me on the Charlotte roster by noon,” Kelly recalled. “And they agreed." The ballplayer went on to have the second-highest batting average (.321) in the league that year, behind only Johnnie Fenderson's .324. He also finished second to Thompson in steals, with 52 as opposed to Thompson's 60. In 113 games, Kelly scored 74 runs, recorded 126 hits, had three home runs, and batted in 55 runs.

== Minnesota Twins (1967–68) ==
In 1967, Kelly moved up to Class AAA, spending most of the year with the Denver Bears of the Pacific Coast League (PCL). He played 65 games for them, batting .286 with 42 runs scored, 70 hits, no home runs, 15 RBI, and 19 stolen bases. That September, he reached the major leagues for the first time, promoted by the Twins when rosters expanded. His first game came on September 6, when he pinch-ran for Frank Kostro in a 3–2 loss to the Cleveland Indians. Seven of the eight games he played were as a pinch runner; he pinch hit in one other game, striking out against Bob Humphreys in his only at bat of the season. After the 1967 season, he played some games for the Twins affiliate in the Florida Instructional League as well.

Kelly spent most of the 1968 season in Denver. In 108 games, he had 70 runs scored, 121 hits, three home runs, and 31 RBI. Kelly finished third in the league with a .306 batting average (topped only by Jim Hicks's .366 and José Herrera's .311), and he led the league with 38 stolen bases. That September, he was again called up by Minnesota. Though he only appeared in 12 games this year, he received more playing time, as he started in the outfield for nine of them. On September 23, he hit his first major league home run, coming against Clyde Wright in a 3–0 victory over the California Angels. With the Twins in 1968, he had four hits in 35 at bats. After the season, he went to Venezuela to play winter baseball. Originally, he was going to play for the Leones del Caracas with Twins teammate César Tovar, but because the Leones already had enough outfielders, he played for the Navegantes del Magallanes instead. In 60 games, he batted .342 with 11 home runs and 45 RBI. He and Cito Gaston were some of the first foreign stars for the team as they helped the Navegantes to reach the first round of the playoffs.

== Kansas City Royals (1969–70) ==
While Kelly was in Venezuela, the Kansas City Royals selected him in the fourth round of the 1968 Major League Baseball expansion draft. His playing time increased in 1969, as he started 106 games in the outfield: 60 as a right fielder, 44 as a center fielder, and two as a left fielder. "He’s tremendously improved with the bat," opined manager Joe Gordon. "He’s changed his whole style of attacking the ball. . .he has a quick bat, a good level swing and has no fear at the plate. He’ll hit all kinds of pitching." In 112 games (417 at bats), Kelly batted .264 with 61 runs scored, 110 hits, eight home runs, and 32 RBI. He stole a career-high 40 bases in 53 attempts. After the year, the Royals sent him to their instructional league affiliate to refine his hitting, bunting, and fielding technique.

Kelly began 1970 as the Royals starting right fielder. He seemed to be losing the position to Joe Keough in June, as Keough started 12 straight games there beginning June 16 while Kelly was used mainly as a pinch hitter during that stretch. After Keough broke his leg on June 28, Kelly served as the starting right fielder again for the rest of the year. On September 11, against the Oakland Athletics, his single with two outs in the eighth inning spoiled a no hitter by Vida Blue, who went on to complete one 10 days later. In 136 games (452 at bats), Kelly batted .235 with 56 runs scored, 106 hits, six home runs, and 38 RBI. He stole 34 bases in 50 attempts.

== Chicago White Sox (1971–76) ==
Kelly was traded along with Don O'Riley from the Royals to the Chicago White Sox for Matias and Gail Hopkins on October 13, 1970. Before he played a game for the White Sox, Kelly spent the 1970–71 offseason in Venezuela with the Tiburones de La Guaira. He batted .365 with six home runs in 27 games, then batted .405 in the postseason as the Tiburones won the league championship. Kelly was less successful in spring training with the White Sox, as he ran into a fence and hurt his right knee, struggled to hit, and was sent to the minor leagues to begin the season. "I was a little upset. . . no, I guess I was a great deal upset," Kelly recalled three years later. "But I talked to my brother and finally got myself together again." In 75 games (301 at bats) with the PCL's Tucson Toros, Kelly batted .355 with 71 runs scored, 107 hits, six home runs, 43 RBI, and 15 stolen bases in 19 tries. Called up by the White Sox in June, Kelly never played a game in the minor leagues again. He had established himself in the major leagues, though for the rest of his career, he was mainly used against right-handed pitching. In 67 games (213 at bats) for the White Sox, he batted .291 with 32 runs scored, 62 hits, three home runs, 22 RBI, and 14 stolen bases in 23 attempts. After the season, he played for the Tiburones again, hitting no home runs but batting .400 as La Guira reached the final round of the playoffs.

Kelly shared right field duties with Walt Williams in 1972 but got the bulk of the starts. In the second game of a doubleheader against the Texas Rangers on August 6, Kelly walked to lead off the game, stole second base, advanced to third on a groundout, and stole home for the only run of the game. Exactly 14 days later, he played a big part in the first game of a doubleheader, with the White Sox trailing the Boston Red Sox 7–6 in the ninth and two outs. Kelly hit a three-run walkoff home run against Marty Pattin to give Chicago a 9–7 victory. "It's a good thing my boy didn't leave Kelly out of the lineup," manager Chuck Tanner quipped with reporters afterwards. Adept at base-stealing, Kelly's "small ball" contributions helped the White Sox finished second place in the American League (AL) West Division, behind Oakland. In 119 games (402 at bats), Kelly batted .261 with 57 runs scored, 105 hits, five home runs, 24 RBI, and 32 stolen bases in 41 attempts. After the season, Kelly played in the Venezuelan leagues for the last time, batting .296 with two home runs in 35 games as the Tiburones reached the playoffs.

The 1973 season was one of Kelly's best. Hitting from the start, he led the major leagues with a .441 batting average at the end of May. A hurt shoulder made throwing more difficult for the outfielder, but it did not keep him from hitting. "I’ve become much more selective about pitches in my swing zone,” Kelly explained, “and I’m seeing the ball good. When you’re hitting, it’s as big as a balloon." On the strength of his hot start, Kelly was selected to the AL All-Star team for the only time in his career, chosen by manager Dick Williams. Playing in a career-high 144 games (550 at bats), he hit .280 with 77 runs scored, 154 hits, 24 doubles, one home run, 44 RBI, and 22 stolen bases in 37 attempts.

Kelly was used a majority of the time as the designated hitter for the White Sox in 1974, as Bill Sharp got more of the starts in right field. On June 24, Kelly's sixth-inning single against Steve Busby was the first hit off the pitcher in 17 innings, spoiling Busby's attempt at throwing a second straight no hitter. He topped his batting average from the previous year by one point, accruing 60 runs scored, 119 hits, four home runs, and 21 RBI in 122 games (424 at bats). Kelly stole 18 bases in 29 attempts.

In 1975, Kelly resumed his duties as Chicago's primary right fielder. With the White Sox trailing Oakland 3–2 in the first game of the season on April 8, and the tying run on second base, Kelly had a pinch-hit single against Rollie Fingers. However, Lee Richard was thrown out trying to score, and the White Sox lost 3–2. The next day, Kelly pinch-hit against Fingers again in the ninth, with the bases loaded and the White Sox down by a run. This time, his pinch-hit triple put the White Sox ahead for a 7–5 victory. In 133 games (471 at bats), he batted .274 with 73 runs scored, 129 hits, nine home runs, 45 RBI, and 18 stolen bases in 28 chances.

Kelly returned to the designated hitter role in 1976, as the newly acquired Ralph Garr became the starting right fielder. In 107 games (311 at bats), Kelly batted .254 with 42 runs scored, 79 hits, five home runs, 34 RBI, and 15 stolen bases in 22 tries.

== Baltimore Orioles (1977–80) ==
Kelly was acquired by the Baltimore Orioles from the White Sox for Dave Duncan on November 18, 1976. The transaction was based on a perceived surplus of left-handed hitters and the lack of quality catchers, the latter of which was not solved as Duncan was released the following March without ever having played a game for the White Sox. "A most glaring mistake" is how owner Bill Veeck described the transaction.

With the Orioles, Kelly was used mostly as a left fielder, sharing time there with Andrés Mora in 1977 and 1978. After a 1-for-18 start to the 1977 season, Kelly had a 19-game hitting streak from May 1 through 23. Baltimore manager Earl Weaver said of his performance, "Kelly is hot now. I don't know if he'll stay that way all year. It's kind of doubtful he will, because he has never hit this much before, but no matter what he hits, he's an asset to this club. He was even when he was one-for-18."

On June 3, Kelly was part of what sportswriter Fred Rothenberg called "one of the strangest triple plays in baseball history." With the bases loaded for the Royals in the ninth inning, and Kansas City down 7–5, John Wathan hit a fly ball to right field that Kelly caught for the first out. All the runners tagged to advance a base, but Kelly threw to shortstop Mark Belanger, who caught Freddie Patek in a rundown between first and second base and ultimately tagged him out. While this was going on, Dave Nelson, who had successfully advanced to third base, decided to try to score. Upon tagging out Patek, Belanger ran towards the third base line and caught up with Nelson 10 feet from home plate, tagging him out to complete the triple play and end the game.

In 120 games (360 at bats) for the Orioles in 1977, Kelly batted .256 with 50 runs scored, 92 hits, 10 home runs, 49 RBI, and 25 stolen bases in 32 attempts. He played 100 games for the Orioles in 1978, batting .274 in 274 at bats, with 38 runs scored, 75 hits, a career-high 11 home runs, 40 RBI, and 10 stolen bases in 18 attempts.

Mora returned to Mexico for the 1979 season, and Gary Roenicke became the primary left fielder for the Orioles, limiting Kelly to a bench role. However, 1979 was one of his best seasons, as he posted a career-high .536 slugging percentage and delivered with several important hits during the season. In the 10th inning of a game against the Red Sox on May 23, Kelly had a pinch-hit, walkoff home run against Bob Stanley to give Baltimore a 5–2 victory. Reporters had observed in the past that the Christian Kelly often seemed to have big hits on Sundays, yet this was a Wednesday game. "Wednesday was the first day we had a meeting for Bible study, so though it was not Sunday, it was the same," Kelly pointed out. Exactly three months later, he pinch-hit for Rich Dauer in the eighth inning of a game where Baltimore trailed Oakland 4–3. Facing Dave Heaverlo with the bases loaded, Kelly hit a grand slam, earning curtain calls twice from the ecstatic fans at Memorial Stadium as Baltimore won 7–4. In 68 games (153 at bats), Kelly batted .288 with 25 runs scored, 44 hits, nine home runs, 25 RBI, and four stolen bases in nine attempts as the Orioles won the AL East title.

In the playoffs for the first time, Kelly started three out of the four games in the AL Championship Series against the Angels, batting .364. He hit a three-run home run against John Montague in Game 4, putting the Orioles up 8–0 in a win that sent them to the World Series against the Pittsburgh Pirates. Kelly also played five games in this series but was used only as a pinch-hitter, racking up a hit and a walk in five plate appearances. Batting for Rick Dempsey in the ninth inning of Game 7, Kelly made the last out of the series, flying out to Pirates center fielder Omar Moreno as Baltimore was defeated in seven games.

Kelly had a similar amount of playing time in 1980. Used mostly against right-handed pitchers, he faced right-handed pitchers only five times all year. Against the Detroit Tigers on September 10, he had a pinch-hit grand slam against Dave Rozema, adding another RBI as well in an 8–4 victory. Rozema was the pitcher whom Kelly had the most success against during his career; he had six hits in eight at bats against the Tiger, including four home runs. In 89 games (200 at bats), he batted .260 with 38 runs scored, 52 hits, three home runs, and 26 RBI. He stole 16 bases while only getting caught twice. After the season, he became a free agent.

== Cleveland Indians (1981) ==
Kelly finished his major league career with the Indians during the strike-shortened 1981 season. He hit .213 (16-for-75) in 48 games, with one home run, 16 RBI, and two stolen bases in six attempts. Following the season, he retired from baseball.

== Career overview ==
In a 15-season career, Kelly was a .264 hitter with 76 home runs and 418 RBI in 1,385 games played. He added 1,147 hits, 189 doubles, 35 triples, and 250 stolen bases. A speedy runner, he served most commonly as a leadoff hitter when he was in the starting lineup. According to a common anecdote, Kelly once asked manager Weaver, "Why don't you walk with the Lord?" Weaver responded, "I'd rather you walk with the bases loaded." Kelly actually did walk a great deal during his career, accruing a total of 588 bases on balls.

When Kelly joined the White Sox in 1971, manager Tanner described his arm as "adequate," noting that he was not a "polished outfielder." Later in Kelly's career, Weaver would tell him to stand three feet from the foul line and not move. "If the ball is hit to you, all I want you to do is throw it to second base," Weaver said. When Kelly asked him what to do if it was the ninth inning, the team was up by a run, and someone was trying to score from second, Weaver said, "Don't worry about that. If we're up a run in the ninth inning, you aren't out there anyway."

== Personal life ==
Kelly's friend Andre Thornton introduced the player to his sister-in-law Phyllis Jones, part of The Jones Sisters Trio, who married Kelly on February 10, 1979. Oriole teammate Lee May was one of the ushers at the wedding. Pat and Phyllis had one child, daughter April Marie. During his career, Kelly took college classes at Morgan State University, earning his degree sometime during the 1970s. Fishing and basketball were hobbies of his.

=== Religion ===
Though raised in a Baptist household, Kelly moved on to a lifestyle of "liquor, drugs, [and] women" after his major league career began. He and White Sox teammate Paul Casanova opened the La Pelota nightclub in Caracas, Venezuela, during the 1971–72 offseason. By 1975, he was suffering from depression.

That year, personal friend Clyde White invited him to a Bible class, where Kelly became a born-again Christian. "I thought I was happy before, but actually, I didn't know what true happiness meant," he said in an interview two years later. He was not shy about sharing his faith with his teammates. With the Orioles, he organized a chapel service in the lifting weight room at Memorial Stadium. Scott McGregor, Tippy Martinez, Doug DeCinces, Kiko Garcia, and Ken Singleton became Christians as a result of Kelly's influence. According to Kelly, after he left the Orioles, Weaver sent him a letter expressing his admiration for Kelly's religious devotion.

"Some of the fellows call me 'Reverend'," Kelly said in a 1977 interview. "Other people say I missed my calling." Once his career was over, Kelly did indeed become an ordained minister at the Evangelical Baptist Church in Baltimore. He was a minister for Lifeline Ministries as well. Kelly's service was not just confined to Maryland; he assisted in charity work as the executive director of the Cleveland-based Christian Family Outreach. He travelled back and forth between Cleveland and his home of Timonium, Maryland, also journeying to international destinations to share his faith. "I go and I proclaim the Gospel. I see people saved," Kelly described his ministry.

== Death ==
After preaching in a Methodist church at Amberson, Pennsylvania, on October 2, 2005, Kelly was journeying to visit some friends. He suffered a heart attack in Chambersburg, Pennsylvania, and died at age 61. The ballplayer was buried at Dulaney Valley Memorial Gardens in Timonium. Following his death, Joe Ehrmann, ex-linebacker for the Baltimore Colts and pastor of Grace Fellowship Church in Baltimore, had this to say about Kelly. "Pat was such an asset to the community. He was the embodiment of his religious beliefs. . . He transcended race, class, sports, and was just a fabulous lover of people, a good husband, and father. He was a charismatic preacher whose message came from his own life, and he wanted people to know that he walked with God."
