= John Matias =

American baseball player (1944–2020)

- Outfielder / First baseman
- Born: August 15, 1944; Honolulu, Territory of Hawaii
- Died: April 7, 2020 (aged 75); Aiea, Hawaii, U.S.
- Batted: Left Threw: Left

MLB debut
- April 7, 1970, for the Chicago White Sox

Last MLB appearance
- October 1, 1970, for the Chicago White Sox

MLB statistics
- Batting average: .188
- Home runs: 2
- Runs batted in: 6
- Stats at Baseball Reference

Teams
- Chicago White Sox (1970)

John Matias (August 15, 1944 – April 7, 2020) was an American professional baseball player who played for the Chicago White Sox of Major League Baseball (MLB) in 1970, playing 58 games and hitting .188 with 2 homers. After beginning his professional baseball career in the Baltimore Orioles organization, he was traded along with Luis Aparicio and Russ Snyder to the White Sox for Don Buford, Bruce Howard and Roger Nelson on November 29, 1967. He was dealt along with Gail Hopkins from the White Sox to the Kansas City Royals for Pat Kelly and Don O'Riley on October 13, 1970. He never played in the majors again following the transaction.

He died on April 7, 2020, at his home.
