= Gail Hopkins =

American baseball player (born 1943)

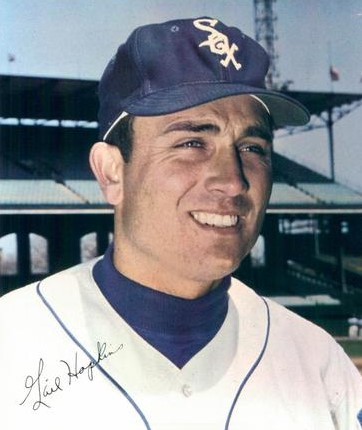
- First baseman
- Born: February 19, 1943 (age 83); Tulsa, Oklahoma, U.S.
- Batted: Left Threw: Right

Professional debut
- MLB: June 29, 1968, for the Chicago White Sox
- NPB: April 5, 1975, for the Hiroshima Toyo Carp

Last appearance
- MLB: October 2, 1974, for the Los Angeles Dodgers
- NPB: September 25, 1977, for the Nankai Hawks

MLB statistics
- Batting average: .266
- Home runs: 25
- Runs batted in: 145

NPB statistics
- Batting average: .282
- Home runs: 69
- Runs batted in: 229
- Stats at Baseball Reference

Teams
- Chicago White Sox (1968–1970); Kansas City Royals (1971–1973); Los Angeles Dodgers (1974); Hiroshima Toyo Carp (1975–1976); Nankai Hawks (1977)

Gail Eason Hopkins (born February 19, 1943) is an American former Major League Baseball player and coach. Before reaching the majors, he attended David Starr Jordan High School and then a catcher at Pepperdine University, where he was named an All-American in 1963. He was primarily a first baseman and catcher in the majors, and was the first Pepperdine baseball player to play Major League Baseball.

== College athlete ==
Hopkins helped Pepperdine qualify for the NCAA Playoffs in both 1962 and 1963 and returned to serve as Pepperdine's head coach for one season in 1968. Hopkins also played basketball at Pepperdine. He recalls that part of why he chose Pepperdine was that he had gone to high school in southern California and wanted to stay in the area; he also wanted to study both religion and biology, and Pepperdine gave him the chance to do so. In 2010, Gail became the second athlete from Pepperdine University to be inducted into the West Coast Conference Hall of Honor. Hopkins was raised in the Churches of Christ.

== Professional career ==
After playing for the Edmonton Oilers in the Western Canadian Baseball League in 1964, Hopkins signed a professional baseball contract with the Chicago White Sox organization. He played minor league baseball from 1965 to 1968 in the Florida State League, California State League, Caroline League, Southern League and Pacific Coast League.

From 1968 to 1974, Hopkins played with the Chicago White Sox, Kansas City Royals and Los Angeles Dodgers, and was a member of the 1974 National League champion Dodgers (though he did not see action in the postseason). He was traded along with John Matias from the White Sox to the Royals for Pat Kelly and Don O'Riley on October 13, 1970. He played in over 100 games each season between 1969 and 1971. Hopkins was known as a difficult batter to strike out and had one of the lowest strikeouts-to-at-bats ratios in baseball during his playing career.

From 1975 to 1977, he subsequently played for the Hiroshima Toyo Carp and Nankai Hawks in the Japanese Professional Baseball leagues. In 1975, Gail set a Hiroshima Carp home run record with 33 while helping lead the Carp to its first Central League Championship and a trip to the Japan Series. In 1976, he played in the Japanese All-Star game, batting .329 for the season. In 1977, Gail played for the Nankai Hawks of the Pacific League, before retiring from professional baseball to pursue a full-time career in medicine.

In Nolan Ryan's first career no-hitter (May 15, 1973), Hopkins appeared as a pinch-hitter in the bottom of the 8th inning, and hit a bloop fly that Angels shortstop Rudy Meoli caught with a running catch. Ryan stated in his autobiography "Throwing Heat" that Hopkins' out was the closest he came to losing the no-hitter.

== Personal life ==
Hopkins and his wife Caroline, who is a registered nurse, raised two children who both became physicians: a daughter, Leah G. Hopkins, M.D., who is an Internal Medicine specialist in private practice in Parkersburg, West Virginia and a son, Gail E. Hopkins, II, M.D., who is an Orthopaedic Spine Surgeon specialist practicing in Redlands, California with Arrowhead Orthopaedics.

After his baseball career ended, he earned four graduate degrees: a Master's in Religion at Pepperdine, a Master of Divinity from United Theological Seminary, a Doctorate in Biology at the Illinois Institute of Technology and an M. D. degree from Rush Medical College where he was a member of Alpha Omega Alpha Honor Medical Society. He went on to become a board certified orthopedic surgeon completing his residency at Loyola University Medical Center in Maywood, Illinois. He engaged in the private practice of orthopedic surgery in Lodi, California (1986–1994), Hinsdale, Illinois (1994–2003) and Parkersburg, West Virginia (2004–2014). He has served on the Pepperdine University Board of Regents since 1986. He later served as the Chairman of the Board of Trustees for the Ohio Valley University, a Churches of Christ affiliated college in West Virginia. where he also served as Adjunct Professor of both Bible and Biology. A 2001 story on Hopkins referred to him as a "thoughtful individual whose love for God forms the center of his life and whose strong convictions shape that life".
