= Buddy Bradford =

American baseball player (born 1944)

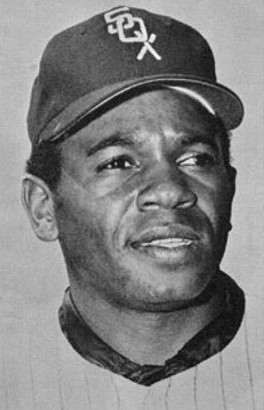
- Outfielder
- Born: July 25, 1944 (age 82); Mobile, Alabama, U.S.
- Batted: Right Threw: Right

Professional debut
- MLB: September 9, 1966, for the Chicago White Sox
- NPB: April 2, 1977, for the Kintetsu Buffaloes

Last appearance
- MLB: July 24, 1976, for the Chicago White Sox
- NPB: July 10, 1977, for the Kintetsu Buffaloes

MLB statistics
- Batting average: .226
- Home runs: 52
- Runs batted in: 175

NPB statistics
- Batting average: .192
- Home runs: 4
- Runs batted in: 11
- Stats at Baseball Reference

Teams
- Chicago White Sox (1966–1970); Cleveland Indians (1970–1971); Cincinnati Reds (1971); Chicago White Sox (1972–1975); St. Louis Cardinals (1975); Chicago White Sox (1976); Kintetsu Buffaloes (1977)

Charles William Bradford (born July 25, 1944) is an American former professional baseball player. He played as an outfielder in Major League Baseball for the Chicago White Sox (1966–70, 1972–75 and 1976), Cleveland Indians (1970–71), Cincinnati Reds (1971) and St. Louis Cardinals (1975). He also played one season for the Kintetsu Buffaloes (1977) in Japan.

Bradford was born in Mobile, Alabama. He was traded along with Tommie Sisk from the White Sox to the Indians for Bob Miller and Barry Moore before the trade deadline on June 15, 1970. He was dealt along with Greg Terlecky from the Cardinals to the White Sox for Lee Richard on December 12, 1975. After winning a starting position for the White Sox in 1976, he was released later in the season after a poor offensive output.

In eleven MLB seasons, he played in 697 games, had 1,605 at-bats, 224 runs, 363 hits, 50 doubles, 8 triples, 52 home runs, 175 RBI, 36 stolen bases, 184 walks, .226 batting average, .311 on-base percentage, .364 slugging percentage, 585 total bases, 12 sacrifice hits, 11 sacrifice flies and 16 intentional walks. He had a strong arm and was a solid outfielder, although he never won a Gold Glove Award.
