= Don O'Riley =

American baseball player (1945–1997)

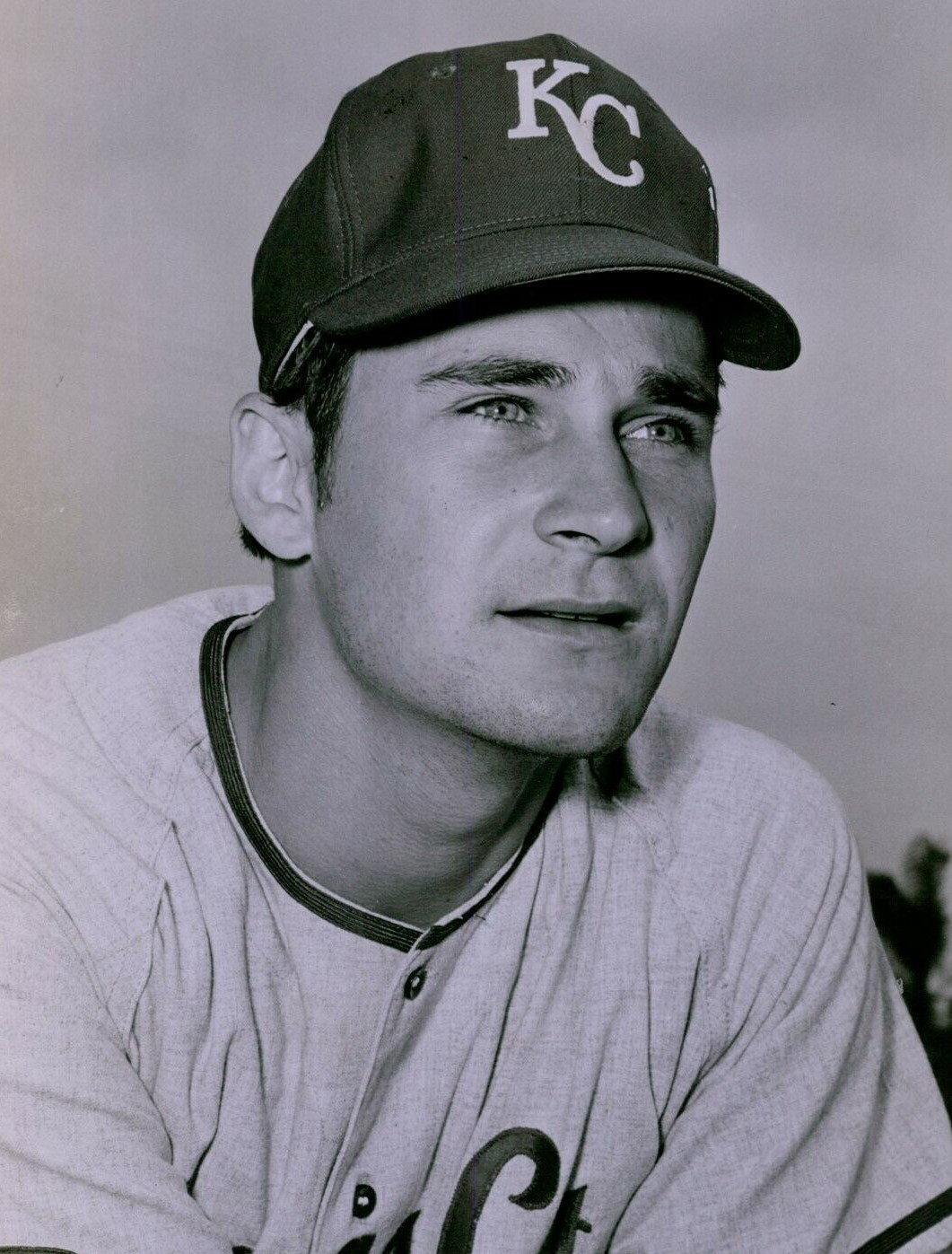
- Pitcher
- Born: March 12, 1945; Topeka, Kansas, U.S.
- Died: May 2, 1997 (aged 52); Kansas City, Missouri, U.S.
- Batted: Right Threw: Right

MLB debut
- June 20, 1969, for the Kansas City Royals

Last MLB appearance
- August 1, 1970, for the Kansas City Royals

MLB statistics
- Win–loss record: 1–1
- Earned run average: 6.17
- Strikeouts: 23
- Stats at Baseball Reference

Teams
- Kansas City Royals (1969–1970)

Donald Lee O'Riley (March 12, 1945 – May 2, 1997) was an American Major League Baseball pitcher who played for two seasons. He pitched in 18 games for the Kansas City Royals during the inaugural 1969 season and nine games during the 1970 season. He was traded along with Pat Kelly from the Royals to the Chicago White Sox for Gail Hopkins and John Matias on October 13, 1970.

O'Riley died at age 52 after being fatally shot during a convenience store robbery.
