= Gene Rounsaville =

American baseball player (born 1944)

- Pitcher
- Born: September 27, 1944 (age 80); Konawa, Oklahoma
- Batted: Right Threw: Right

MLB debut
- April 7, 1970, for the Chicago White Sox

Last MLB appearance
- April 29, 1970, for the Chicago White Sox

MLB statistics
- Win–loss record: 0–1
- Earned run average: 9.95
- Strikeouts: 3
- Stats at Baseball Reference

Teams
- Chicago White Sox (1970)

Virle Gene Rounsaville (born September 27, 1944) is a former Major League Baseball pitcher who appeared in eight games for the Chicago White Sox in 1970.

In Rounsaville's last major league appearance, he was one of three pitchers who each gave up a home run to Paul Blair of the Baltimore Orioles.
