= Rick Reichardt =

American baseball player (born 1943)

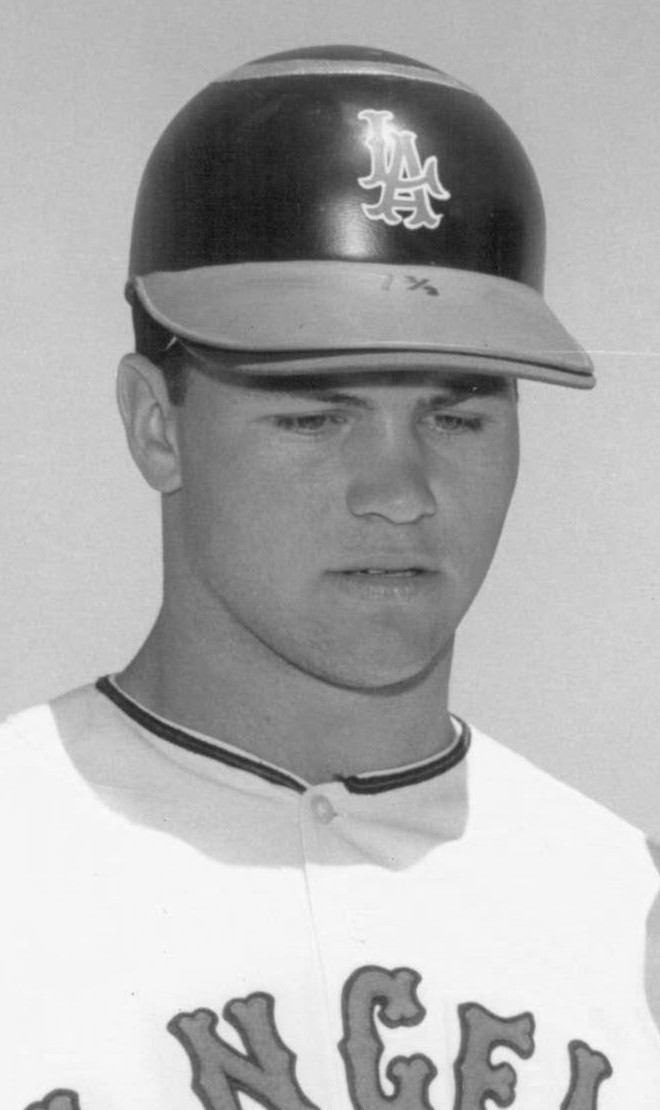
- Reichardt in 1965
- Left fielder
- Born: March 16, 1943 (age 83); Stevens Point, Wisconsin, U.S.
- Batted: Right Threw: Right

MLB debut
- September 1, 1964, for the Los Angeles Angels

Last MLB appearance
- April 9, 1974, for the Kansas City Royals

MLB statistics
- Batting average: .261
- Home runs: 116
- Runs batted in: 445
- Stats at Baseball Reference

Teams
- Los Angeles / California Angels (1964–1970); Washington Senators (1970); Chicago White Sox (1971–1973); Kansas City Royals (1973–1974)

Frederic Carl Reichardt (born March 16, 1943) is an American former Major League outfielder for the Los Angeles / California Angels (1964–70), Washington Senators (1970), Chicago White Sox (1971–73) and Kansas City Royals (1973–74). He batted and threw right-handed.

Reichardt was a spectacular two-sport star at the University of Wisconsin, twice leading the Big Ten Conference in batting, and starring as a fullback on the 1962 #2 ranked Badgers Rose Bowl team, which was defeated in the 1963 Rose Bowl by #1 ranked USC in the "comeback that never was", where the Badgers scored 23 points in the last 12 minutes, but still lost by 5 points, 42–37. His football playing career never went beyond being selected by the Baltimore Colts in the 17th round (238th overall) of the 1965 NFL draft.

His athletic prowess was highly rated by MLB scouts, and when a bidding war ensued for his signing, he received a $200,000 (equivalent to $2,100,000 in 2025) signing bonus from the Los Angeles Angels, a record for that time. It was the bidding war for Reichardt that ultimately led MLB to institute a draft, which started in 1965, with Rick Monday being the first ever #1 overall selection (he was drafted by the Kansas City Athletics).

In 1966, Reichardt became the first player to hit a home run at Anaheim Stadium. Later that season, after batting .288 with 16 home runs and 44 RBI through just 89 games, he was diagnosed with a kidney ailment that necessitated the removal of the kidney. Although he recovered to hit .265 with 17 home runs in 1967 and .255 with 21 home runs in 1968, he was never quite the same after the operation. After hitting only 13 home runs in 1969, he was traded with Aurelio Rodríguez to the Washington Senators early in the 1970 season for third baseman Ken McMullen. After being acquired by the White Sox from the Senators for Gerry Janeski on February 9, 1971, he managed to hit .278 with 19 homers. From there, age and injuries took their toll and he never again attained double figures in home runs in a season. He was released by the White Sox on June 28, 1973 after playing in 46 games with a .275 batting average and three home runs. He had refused to sign his 1973 contract because of a dispute with general manager Stu Holcomb. He retired after one at-bat in the 1974 season.
