= Gerry Janeski =

American baseball player (born 1946)

- Pitcher
- Born: April 18, 1946 (age 80); Pasadena, California, U.S.
- Batted: Right Threw: Right

MLB debut
- April 10, 1970, for the Chicago White Sox

Last MLB appearance
- May 28, 1972, for the Texas Rangers

MLB statistics
- Win–loss record: 11–23
- Earned run average: 4.73
- Strikeouts: 105
- Stats at Baseball Reference

Teams
- Chicago White Sox (1970); Washington Senators / Texas Rangers (1971–1972)

Gerald Joseph Janeski (born April 18, 1946) is an American former professional baseball player, a right-handed pitcher who appeared in 62 games in the Major Leagues from 1970 to 1972 for the Chicago White Sox and Washington Senators/Texas Rangers. Born in Pasadena, California, he was listed as 6 feet 4 inches (1.93 m) tall and 205 pounds (93 kg).

== Baseball career ==
After graduating from La Salle College Preparatory in Pasadena, Janeski signed as a free agent with the Boston Red Sox before the 1965 season, just before implementation of the Major League Baseball draft. He spent five years in the Bosox' farm system, rising to Triple-A, where he won 15 games (with 14 complete games) in 1969 as a member of the Louisville Colonels. That December, the parent Red Sox acquired left-handed starting pitcher Gary Peters, a former two-time All-Star, from the White Sox in a four-player trade, and later added Janeski to the deal as compensation on March 9, 1970.

The trade set the stage for Janeski's three-season MLB career. He made his debut on April 10, the third game of the White Sox's 1970 season, as the starter against the recently relocated Milwaukee Brewers, and was credited with a 5–4 victory, going 71/3 innings and allowing ten hits, but only three runs. He also recorded seven strikeouts. In his next start, five days later, he threw a three-hit, complete game shutout against the Oakland Athletics, improving his won–lost record to 2–0 and lowering his earned run average to 1.65. Though he remained in the starting rotation through the season, his performance leveled off and the 1970 White Sox proved to be perhaps the worst team in franchise history, losing a franchise-record 106 games. Janeski made 35 starts, pitched 2052/3 innings, and won ten games— all second on the staff to Tommy John. He absorbed 17 defeats, with his ERA climbing to 4.77. The rebuilding White Sox traded him to the Washington Senators for Rick Reichardt on 9 February 1971.

He began 1971 in the Washington bullpen, and made only two starts before May 15. Then, he briefly joined the Senators' rotation over the next five weeks. But he struggled with his control, and by June 29 his record stood at 1–5, with 34 bases on balls and 19 strikeouts in 612/3 innings pitched. He spent the rest of 1971 with the Senators' Triple-A Denver Bears affiliate, as the parent team struggled through its final year in Washington before transferring to Dallas–Fort Worth as the Texas Rangers for the 1972 campaign. Janeski worked in only four games for the 1972 Rangers, with only one start, on May 23 against the White Sox. He allowed two runs in the top of the first inning, then held the ChiSox off the scoreboard into the sixth, departing for left-hander Mike Paul with two out, two men on base, and trailing 2–1. Paul ended the threat, but the Rangers could not bounce back, and the 2–1 loss was Janeski's last MLB decision. Sent to Triple-A after May 28, he spent the remainder of his pro career at the top level of the minor leagues, retiring in 1974.

Over his three full or partial major-league seasons, Janeski compiled an 11–23 record in 62 games and 46 starting assignments, with four complete games, one shutout (against Oakland in the second appearance of his rookie campaign), one save, and a 4.73 earned run average. In 280 innings pitched, he allowed 330 hits and 104 bases on balls, with 105 strikeouts.

His nickname while pitching with the White Sox was "The Wheat Germ Kid" which was coined by Jerome Holtzman because of his health food regimen which also included dietary supplements. He later became a successful real estate agent.
