= Don Eddy (baseball) =

American baseball player (1946–2018)

- Pitcher
- Born: October 25, 1946; Mason City, Iowa, U.S.
- Died: October 10, 2018 (aged 71); Rockwell, Iowa, U.S.
- Batted: Right Threw: Left

MLB debut
- April 7, 1970, for the Chicago White Sox

Last MLB appearance
- September 30, 1971, for the Chicago White Sox

MLB statistics
- Win–loss record: 0–2
- Earned run average: 2.36
- Strikeouts: 25
- Stats at Baseball Reference

Teams
- Chicago White Sox (1970–1971)

Donald Eugene Eddy (October 25, 1946 – October 10, 2018) was an American Major League Baseball pitcher who played for the Chicago White Sox in 1970 and 1971. A native of Swaledale, Iowa, he batted right-handed but threw left-handed.

After playing American Legion Baseball and excelling on Rockwell-Swaledale High School's baseball team, Eddy was signed by the White Sox in 1965. Two years of service in the United States Army interrupted his minor league career, but he was called up by the White Sox in 1970. A member of their Opening Day roster in 1971, he posted a list of White Sox left-handers on his locker door, crossing names off each time he thought he had passed them on the depth chart. Optioned to the minor leagues in June, he rejoined the team for three games in September, his last in the major leagues. Overall, he had an 0–2 record and a 2.36 earned run average. Traded to the San Diego Padres in 1972, he finished his professional career in 1973.

== Early life ==
Donald Eugene Eddy was born on October 25, 1946, in Mason City, Iowa, though his hometown was nearby Swaledale. His parents were Elmer and Lorraine Eddy. Elmer had once been a baseball player himself, pitching, catching, and playing the outfield in the St. Louis Cardinals system until he started serving in the United States Marine Corps during World War II. After the war, he joined his brothers to run a hardware, lumber, and propane gas business in Swaledale. He was very much involved in his son's development as a ballplayer, forbidding Don to throw a curveball until he reached high school, as he was afraid the pitch might damage his son's arm.

At Rockwell-Swaledale High School, Don Eddy excelled on the baseball team. He lettered each year on the basketball team, ranking among the scoring leaders in Northern Iowa in his final two years of school. During his high school years, Eddy also played American Legion Baseball. After three years on the Rockwell team, he joined Mason City's squad in his senior year. Pitching 77 2/3 innings, Eddy had a 9–1 record, an 0.93 earned run average (ERA), and 139 strikeouts. Offensively, he batted .349, leading his team in that statistic as well as in home runs and runs batted in (RBI). Behind his contributions, Mason City made it all the way to the state championship game against Waterloo, where Eddy suffered his only loss. The Chicago White Sox signed him in 1965 as an amateur free agent, though he was expected to attend college for a semester before joining the organization.

== Professional career ==
=== Minor leagues (1966–1970) ===
Eddy made his professional debut as a pitcher in 1966 with the Deerfield Beach Sun Sox, which moved to Winter Haven, Florida, during the season. The Sun Sox were a member of the Class A Florida State League. In 16 games, 12 of which were starts, he had a 4–8 record, a 2.07 ERA, 86 strikeouts, 43 walks, and 71 hits allowed in 100 innings pitched.

However, Eddy spent the next two seasons in the United States Army. He did not pitch again until late in the 1968 season, when he pitched 15 innings for the Duluth–Superior Dukes of the Class A short season Northern League. In three games (two starts), he had a 1–1 record and a 3.60 ERA.

In 1969, Eddy had a historic season for the Appleton Foxes of the Class A Midwest League. Posting an 18–3 record, he led the league in wins, winning percentage (.857), ERA (1.81), placing third in strikeouts (140) and innings pitched (164). His 18 wins and 1.81 ERA were both franchise records. For his efforts, he was declared Appleton's Most Valuable Player (MVP). After the season, he pitched in the Florida Instructional League and also played winter ball in Venezuela with the goal of developing a better slider.

After serving mostly as a starting pitcher in 1969, Eddy was used nearly exclusively as a relief pitcher with the Tucson Toros of the Class AAA Pacific Coast League (PCL) in 1970. His teammates jokingly nicknamed him "The Vulture", as he recorded several wins without having to throw as many innings as the starters. In 34 games (one start), he had a 10–4 record, nine saves, a 1.37 ERA, 36 strikeouts, 21 walks, and 41 hits allowed in 59 innings.

=== Chicago White Sox (1970–1971) ===
On September 3, 1970, Eddy joined the White Sox on his first Major League Baseball (MLB) callup. He made his MLB debut on September 7, pitching an inning of scoreless relief in a 7–5 loss to the Oakland Athletics in the second game of a doubleheader at Comiskey Park. In seven games as a rookie, he had no record, a 2.31 ERA, nine strikeouts, six walks, and 10 hits allowed in 11 2/3 innings.

Eddy was a member of Chicago's Opening Day roster in 1971. After seeing him pitch in spring training, Chuck Tanner, the team's manager, said "Eddy can be our most dependable pitcher in short relief". He got his first MLB decision on April 16, when he gave up a 10th-inning home run to Reggie Jackson that was the difference-maker in a 5–4 loss to Oakland. On April 25, he suffered another loss in an eighth-inning appearance against the Boston Red Sox. After retiring the first two hitters he faced, he allowed a walk and two singles to load the bases, then walked Carl Yastrzemski to force in the deciding run in a 5–4 defeat.

During the season, Eddy kept a list of the White Sox left-handed pitchers on his locker door, crossing names off each time he thought he thought he had passed one on the depth chart. "It was a big joke in the clubhouse," recalled fellow left-hander Tommy John, who eventually saw his name crossed off the list. Eventually, Eddy found himself optioned to Tucson on June 18. Though he had posted what McAuley called a "respectable" 3.12 ERA in 19 games for Chicago, the White Sox wanted to call up Stan Perzanowski, who had a 9–0 record with Tucson.

In 24 games (four starts) for Tucson, Eddy had a 3–2 record, one save, a 6.85 ERA, 41 strikeouts, 34 walks, and 57 hits allowed in 46 innings. Recalled by Chicago in September, he appeared in three more games for the MLB team. The last of these came on September 30, when Eddy pitched two innings and had his only MLB plate appearance. He hit a double off of Bill Parsons of the Milwaukee Brewers, giving himself a perfect 1.000 batting average. In 22 games, he had an 0–2 record, a 2.38 ERA, 14 strikeouts, 19 walks, and 19 hits allowed in 22 2/3 innings.

=== Minor leagues (1972–1973) ===
Eddy was one of the last players cut from White Sox spring training in 1972, as he was reassigned to minor league camp on March 31. After starting the season at Tucson, he was sent to the San Diego Padres on July 16 as the player to be named later in an earlier trade for Ed Spiezio. In San Diego's organization, he pitched for the PCL's Hawaii Islanders. Baseball-Reference does not have complete statistics on his season.

In 1973, Eddy made 36 appearances with the Alexandria Aces of the Class AA Texas League. He had a 3–2 record, a 2.00 ERA, 58 strikeouts, 15 walks, and 49 hits allowed in 63 innings. By 1975, he was pitching for the Mason City Merchants in the North Central Amateur baseball league. After his career, Eddy joined the Major League Baseball Players Alumni Association (MLBPAA). He would coach summer MLBPAA youth camps in Des Moines. He finished his MLB career with an 0–2 record, a 2.36 ERA, 23 strikeouts, 25 walks, and 29 hits allowed in 34 1/3 innings pitched over 29 games.

== Pitching style ==
Eddy stood 5 feet 11 inches (1.80 m) and weighed 170 pounds (77 kg). Though a left-handed pitcher, he batted right-handed. His fastball was his best pitch. He also threw a slider and, in 1970, was working on developing a curveball. Regis McAuley, sports editor for the Tucson Daily Citizen, thought Eddy was similar to Whitey Ford, both in stature as well as in his reliance on carefully thrown fastball. Eddy listed Ford among the left-handed pitchers he enjoyed watching on television growing up, along with Billy Pierce and Herb Score.

== Personal life ==
On September 10, 1966, Eddy married his high school girlfriend, Marilyn Jane Losee. The couple had two sons, Trent and Travis. She died on April 6, 1978. Two years later, Eddy remarried to Bernadette "Bernie" Hanna, a widow with one son, Charlie. A golfer, Eddy won seven club championships and had seven holes-in-one to his credit. He died at his Rockwell home on October 10, 2018, from pancreatic cancer.
