= Ed Herrmann =

American baseball player (1946–2013)

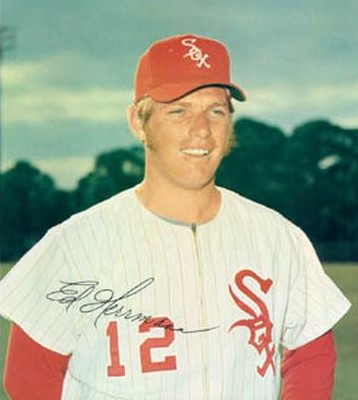
- Catcher
- Born: August 27, 1946; San Diego, California, U.S.
- Died: December 22, 2013 (aged 67); Poway, California, U.S.
- Batted: Left Threw: Right

MLB debut
- September 1, 1967, for the Chicago White Sox

Last MLB appearance
- September 15, 1978, for the Montreal Expos

MLB statistics
- Batting average: .240
- Home runs: 80
- Runs batted in: 320
- Stats at Baseball Reference

Teams
- Chicago White Sox (1967, 1969–1974); New York Yankees (1975); California Angels (1976); Houston Astros (1976–1978); Montreal Expos (1978)

Career highlights and awards
- All-Star (1974)

Edward Martin Herrmann (August 27, 1946 – December 22, 2013) was an American professional baseball player born in San Diego, California. He played in Major League Baseball as a catcher for the Chicago White Sox, the New York Yankees, the California Angels, the Houston Astros and the Montreal Expos from 1967 through 1978. He batted left and threw right handed.

== Major league career ==
Herrmann was contracted as an amateur free agent by the Milwaukee Braves in 1964, and was then drafted from the Braves by the Chicago White Sox later that year. While playing for the Evansville White Sox in 1967, he led the Southern League in putouts, assists and in fielding percentage.

Herrmann made his Major League Baseball debut for the White Sox at the age of 20 on September 1, 1967. He returned to the minor leagues in 1968, before rejoining the White Sox in 1969, replacing Duane Josephson as their starting catcher. Herrmann had his best season offensively in 1970 when he posted a .283 batting average with 19 home runs and 52 runs batted in.

In 1972, Herrmann led the American League in intentional walks with 19, and led all American League catchers in baserunners caught stealing and in caught stealing percentage, as the White Sox battled the Oakland Athletics for the American League West Division championship, coming from eight and a half games behind on July 17 to take first place on August 20, before finishing the season five and a half games behind the eventual world champion Athletics. In a game against the Oakland Athletics on June 24, 1973, Herrmann hit a three-run home run, a two-run double and a two-run single, for a total of seven runs batted in, one short of the White Sox team record of eight.

Herrmann developed a reputation as one of the best knuckleball catchers in the American League from his work with such knuckleball pitchers as Hoyt Wilhelm, Wilbur Wood and Eddie Fisher. Wood won twenty or more games for four consecutive years between 1971 and 1974 with Herrmann as his catcher. Unfortunately for Herrmann, trying to catch the unpredictable knuckleball pitch also contributed to his leading American League catchers four times in passed balls allowed. In 1974, Herrmann was selected to be a member of the American League All-Star team.

Herrmann had a contract dispute with the White Sox during spring training in 1975, and after ten years with the White Sox organisation, he was traded to the New York Yankees on April 1 of that year. He served as a third-string catcher for the Yankees during the 1975 season, working behind Thurman Munson and ahead of Rick Dempsey, before he was purchased in February 1976 by the California Angels. Herrmann played only a half season with the Angels during which he platooned alongside right hand hitting catcher Andy Etchebarren. In June 1976, Herrmann was traded to the Houston Astros, where he replaced Milt May as the Astros' starting catcher. Herrmann was the Astros catcher on July 9, 1976 when pitcher Larry Dierker threw a no-hitter against the Montreal Expos. He worked as back up catcher to Joe Ferguson in 1977, posting a .291 batting average in 56 games. Herrmann was purchased by the Montreal Expos in 1978 where he was a reserve catcher, working behind Gary Carter. He retired at the end of the 1978 season.

== Career statistics ==
In an eleven-year major league career, Herrmann played in 922 games, accumulating 654 hits in 2,729 at bats for a .240 career batting average along with 80 home runs and 320 runs batted in. He posted a .987 career fielding percentage. Herrmann was the grandson of former major league player Marty Herrmann.

== Post-retirement ==
After leaving the major leagues, Herrmann continued to work in baseball as a baseball scout for the Kansas City Royals, also serving as a tutor, coach, and manager of youth teams ranging in age from 13 through college. He also coached four travel teams to national championships. Besides, he participated in charity golf tournament events year-round for the Anaheim Angels, the Chicago White Sox, along with other major charities.

During the same period, he collaborated as a year-round coach for Del Mar Powerhouse and the North County Cobras, as well as a volunteer for The Rock Academy Warriors baseball team.

In addition, he served as Chapter President for the Non-Profit Christian Motorcyclists Association Wings of Eagles, Chapter 498, in North San Diego County, California since January, 2013.

Herrmann died in 2013 at the age of 67, following a long battle with prostate cancer.
