= Jerry Crider =

American baseball player (1941–2008)

- Pitcher
- Born: September 2, 1941; Sioux Falls, South Dakota, U.S.
- Died: April 4, 2008 (aged 66); Phoenix, Arizona, U.S.
- Batted: Right Threw: Right

MLB debut
- May 21, 1969, for the Minnesota Twins

Last MLB appearance
- September 29, 1970, for the Chicago White Sox

MLB statistics
- Win–loss record: 5–7
- Earned run average: 4.51
- Innings pitched: 119 2/3
- Stats at Baseball Reference

Teams
- Minnesota Twins (1969); Chicago White Sox (1970)

Jerry Stephen Crider (September 2, 1941 – April 4, 2008) was an American professional baseball pitcher in Major League Baseball who played for the Minnesota Twins (1969) and Chicago White Sox (1970). Listed at 6 ft 2 in (1.88 m), 180 lb., Crider batted and threw right-handed. He was born in Sioux Falls, South Dakota.

In a two-season career, Crider posted a 5–7 record with a 4.51 ERA in 53 appearances, including nine starts, giving up 64 runs (four unearned) on 132 hits and 49 walks while striking out 56 in 119 2/3 innings of work.

Following his baseball career, Crider moved to Mexico and opened a hunting business. He died in Phoenix, Arizona, at the age of 66 and was buried in Mexico.

== See also ==
- 1969 Minnesota Twins season
- 1970 Chicago White Sox season
