= Greg Terlecky =

American baseball player (born 1952)

- Pitcher
- Born: March 20, 1952 (age 73); Culver City, California
- Batted: Right Threw: Right

MLB debut
- June 12, 1975, for the St. Louis Cardinals

Last MLB appearance
- September 23, 1975, for the St. Louis Cardinals

MLB statistics
- Win–loss record: 0–1
- Earned run average: 4.45
- Strikeouts: 13
- Stats at Baseball Reference

Teams
- St. Louis Cardinals (1975)

Gregory John Terlecky (born March 20, 1952) is a former Major League Baseball pitcher. Terlecky played for the St. Louis Cardinals in 1975. He was traded along with Buddy Bradford from the Cardinals to the White Sox for Lee Richard on December 12, 1975.
