= Don Gutteridge =

American baseball player and manager (1912–2008)

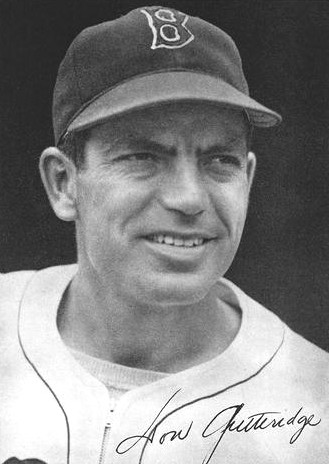
- Infielder / Manager
- Born: June 19, 1912; Pittsburg, Kansas, U.S.
- Died: September 7, 2008 (aged 96); Pittsburg, Kansas, U.S.
- Batted: Right Threw: Right

MLB debut
- September 7, 1936, for the St. Louis Cardinals

Last MLB appearance
- May 9, 1948, for the Pittsburgh Pirates

MLB statistics
- Batting average: .256
- Home runs: 39
- Runs batted in: 391
- Managerial record: 109–172
- Winning %: .388
- Stats at Baseball Reference

Teams
- As player: St. Louis Cardinals (1936–1940); St. Louis Browns (1942–1945); Boston Red Sox (1946–1947); Pittsburgh Pirates (1948); As manager: Chicago White Sox (1969–1970)

Donald Joseph Gutteridge (June 19, 1912 – September 7, 2008) was an American infielder, coach, manager and scout in Major League Baseball. Primarily a second baseman and third baseman, he was a member of the St. Louis Cardinals, St. Louis Browns, Boston Red Sox and Pittsburgh Pirates over 12 seasons between 1936 and 1948, and later managed the Chicago White Sox in 1969–1970. He was the regular second baseman of the 1944 Browns, the only St. Louis entry to win an American League pennant.

Born in Pittsburg, Kansas, Gutteridge was a first cousin of MLB catcher Ray Mueller. He threw and batted right-handed, stood 5 feet 10 inches (1.78 m) tall and weighed 160 pounds (73 kg). After entering pro ball in 1932, Gutteridge played his first game for the Cardinals at age 24, and in only his fifth career major league game hit two home runs in the first game of a doubleheader on September 11, 1936, including an inside-the-park home run and one steal of home plate. Over the course of his career, he was an average hitter with excellent speed and fielding ability; he turned five double plays in a game in 1944 during the Browns' long pennant-winning season. Gutteridge was sold to the Red Sox in 1946, where he played in his only other World Series. His MLB playing career ended after only two games with the Pirates in 1948.

In 1,151 games over 12 seasons, Gutteridge compiled a .256 batting average (1,075-for-4,202) with 586 runs, 200 doubles, 64 triples, 39 home runs, 95 stolen bases, 309 base on balls, 444 strikeouts, .308 on-base percentage and .362 slugging percentage. Defensively, he recorded a .956 fielding percentage. In the 1944 and 1946 World Series, covering nine games, he batted .192. (five-for-26).

Before his contract obtained by the Red Sox on July 9, 1946, Gutteridge had been the player-manager of the Browns' top farm club, the Toledo Mud Hens of the Triple-A American Association. He resumed his managerial career in 1951, then coached for the White Sox for over a decade (1955–1966 and 1968–1969), including the 1959 pennant-winning team. In 1969, he succeeded Al López as manager on May 3. He led Chicago to a fifth-place finish in the AL West that season. With the White Sox record a major league-worst 49–87, Gutteridge requested and was granted a release from his contract on September 2, 1970, after being informed by general manager Stu Holcomb that he would not be retained for 1971. He was succeeded on an interim basis by Bill Adair. Gutteridge's record over those two partial seasons was 109–172 (.388).

He later was a long-time scout for the Kansas City Royals, New York Yankees and Los Angeles Dodgers.

Don Gutteridge died on September 7, 2008, in his hometown of Pittsburg after contracting pneumonia. At the time of his death, Gutteridge was the oldest living former manager or coach in Major League Baseball. He was also the last living member of the St. Louis Browns who played in the 1944 World Series—the franchise's only Fall Classic.

== Managerial record ==
Team	Year	Regular season					Postseason			
Team	Year	Games	Won	Lost	Win %	Finish	Won	Lost	Win %	Result
CWS	1969	145	60	85	.414	5th in AL West	–	–	–	–
CWS	1970	136	49	87	.360	fired	–	–	–	–
Total		281	109	172	.388		0	0	–	
