= Bill Adair =

American baseball coach and manager

- Coach
- Born: February 10, 1913; Mobile, Alabama, U.S.
- Died: June 17, 2002 (aged 89); Bay Minette, Alabama, U.S.
- Batted: Right Threw: Right

Teams
- Milwaukee Braves / Atlanta Braves (1962, 1967); Chicago White Sox (1970); Montreal Expos (1976)

Marion Danne "Bill" Adair (February 10, 1913 – June 17, 2002) was an American coach and interim manager in Major League Baseball (MLB).

A second baseman, he was a career minor-league player who never rose about the Class AA level but who spent 21 years as a manager in the minors.

== History ==
Born in Mobile, Alabama, Adair was a manager in the Braves organization (he managed farm clubs for all three cities the Braves played in), as well as the Detroit Tigers, San Diego Padres, Montreal Expos, and the Chicago White Sox organizations.

Adair was later a major league scout for the Philadelphia Phillies.

He compiled a 1,611-1,305 (.552) record in the minors, but his managing career in the major leagues was limited to ten games with the 1970 White Sox which was en route to a then franchise-worst 56–106 finish. He had succeeded Don Gutteridge on an interim basis on September 2 with the team's record a major league-worst 49–87. His last game managing the White Sox was an 8–7 win over the Minnesota Twins at Metropolitan Stadium on September 13. He compiled a 4–6 (.400) record before Chuck Tanner took over two days later on September 15. Adair was not retained by Tanner beyond that season.

Adair also was a major league coach for the Braves (1962; 1967), White Sox (1970) and Expos (1976).

=== Managerial record ===
Team	Year	Regular season					Postseason			
Team	Year	Games	Won	Lost	Win %	Finish	Won	Lost	Win %	Result
CWS	1970	10	4	6	.400	interim	–	–	–	–
Total		10	4	6	.400		0	0	–	

== Death ==
He died in Bay Minette, Alabama at age 89 in 2002, survived by his wife, Olean, and three daughters.

== Personal life ==
Adair enlisted in the United States Army in March 1943. He rose to the rank of technical sergeant and served in the European theatre.

== See also ==
- Chicago White Sox all-time roster
