= Bruce Christensen =

American baseball player (born 1948)

- Shortstop
- Born: February 22, 1948 (age 78); Madison, Wisconsin, U.S.
- Batted: Left Threw: Right

MLB debut
- July 17, 1971, for the California Angels

Last MLB appearance
- September 30, 1971, for the California Angels

MLB statistics
- Batting average: .270
- Home runs: 0
- Runs batted in: 3
- Stats at Baseball Reference

Teams
- California Angels (1971)

Bruce Ray Christensen (born February 22, 1948) is an American former Major League Baseball shortstop for the California Angels. He was drafted by the Angels in the 17th round of the 1966 amateur draft. In his only major league season, 1971, he got into a total of 29 games, 24 at shortstop, and was in the starting lineup 15 times. Most of his starts came when All-Star shortstop Jim Fregosi was on the disabled list. Christensen was called up to the Angels after hitting .309 in 82 games for the Salt Lake City Angels of the Pacific Coast League, and made his major league debut on July 17.

He was an excellent defensive player and an adequate hitter at the major league level. At short he made only one error in 81 chances for a fielding percentage of .988, much higher than the league average. He also participated in 13 double plays. At the plate he was 17-for-63 (.270), and his six walks pushed his on-base percentage up to .333. Not a power hitter, he had just one extra base hit (a double), three runs batted in, and four runs scored.

Christensen's best game as a hitter came on July 28, 1971, when he had three hits and a walk in a 5-1 victory over the Cleveland Indians at Cleveland Stadium. He scored one run and drove in another.
