= Jay Johnstone =

American baseball player (1945–2020)

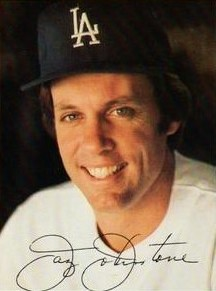
- Outfielder
- Born: November 20, 1945; Manchester, Connecticut, U.S.
- Died: September 26, 2020 (aged 74); Granada Hills, California, U.S.
- Batted: Left Threw: Right

MLB debut
- July 30, 1966, for the California Angels

Last MLB appearance
- October 6, 1985, for the Los Angeles Dodgers

MLB statistics
- Batting average: .267
- Home runs: 102
- Runs batted in: 531
- Stats at Baseball Reference

Teams
- California Angels (1966–1970); Chicago White Sox (1971–1972); Oakland Athletics (1973); Philadelphia Phillies (1974–1978); New York Yankees (1978–1979); San Diego Padres (1979); Los Angeles Dodgers (1980–1982); Chicago Cubs (1982–1984); Los Angeles Dodgers (1985)

Career highlights and awards
- 2× World Series champion (1978, 1981)

John William Johnstone Jr. (November 20, 1945 – September 26, 2020) was an American professional baseball player and television sports announcer. He played in Major League Baseball as an outfielder from 1966 to 1985 for the California Angels, Chicago White Sox, Oakland Athletics, Philadelphia Phillies, New York Yankees, San Diego Padres, Los Angeles Dodgers, and Chicago Cubs.

Johnstone was a member of two World Series teams with the Yankees in 1978 and the Dodgers in 1981. He was known as a versatile outfielder with a good sense of humor, known for keeping clubhouses loose with pranks and gimmicks. He later served as a radio color commentator for the Yankees (1989–1990) and Phillies (1992–1993), and wrote books about his career.

== Early life ==
Johnstone was born on November 20, 1945, in Manchester, Connecticut, to John William Sr., an accountant, and Audrey (Whebell) Johnstone, who was born in Australia. The family moved to Southern California when Johnstone was a child. He attended Edgewood High School, where he excelled at baseball, basketball and football.

== Baseball career ==
Johnstone was signed as an amateur free agent by the Los Angeles Angels, in 1963. He made his major-league debut in July 1966.

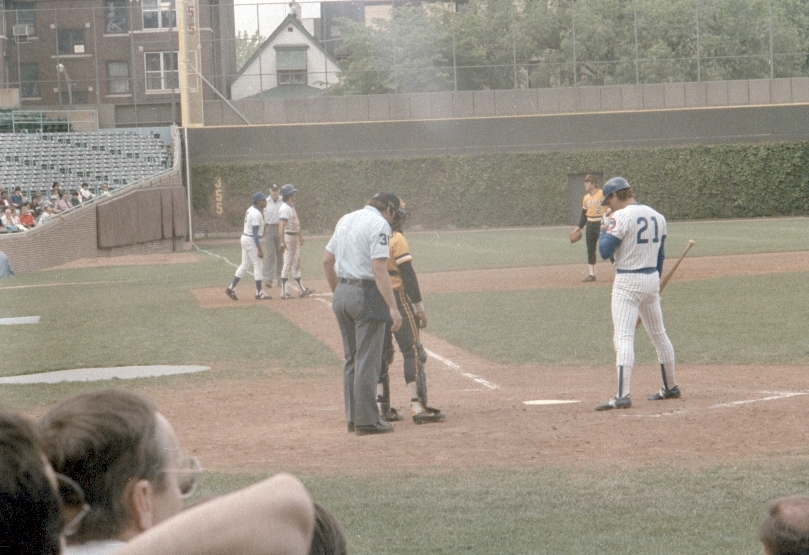
Johnstone (21) batting for the Cubs in 1983 at Wrigley Field in Chicago

As an Angel, Johnstone preserved Clyde Wright's no-hitter against the Athletics in the seventh inning by catching a Reggie Jackson fly ball, 400 feet from home plate, in straightaway center field, just in front of the outfield wall (July 3, 1970). After a campaign in which he batted .238 with 39 runs batted in (RBI) and 11 home runs, Johnstone was traded along with Tom Egan and Tom Bradley from the Angels to the White Sox for Ken Berry, Syd O'Brien, and Billy Wynne, on November 30, 1970.

As a Phillie, Johnstone went 7-for-9 in the 1976 National League Championship Series (NLCS), against the Cincinnati Reds; however, the Reds swept the series. He and Bobby Brown were sent from the Phillies to the Yankees for Rawly Eastwick on the day before the trade deadline on June 14, 1978.

With the Dodgers, Johnstone hit a pinch-hit, two-run home run in Game Four of the 1981 World Series, against the New York Yankees (the home run rallying the Dodgers from a 6–3 deficit to win 8–7). The victory also enabled the Dodgers to tie the Series at two games each; Los Angeles won the next two games, to win it all.

== Clubhouse prankster ==
Johnstone pulled off a number of infamous pranks during his playing days, including placing a soggy brownie inside Steve Garvey's first base mitt, setting teammates' cleats on fire (known as "hot-footing"), cutting out the crotch area of Rick Sutcliffe's underwear, and locking Dodger manager Tommy Lasorda in his office during spring training. Johnstone also nailed teammates' spikes to the floor, and once replaced the celebrity photos in manager Lasorda's office with pictures of himself, Reuss, and Don Stanhouse.

In a 1981 game against Pittsburgh, Johnstone and teammate Jerry Reuss dressed up as groundskeepers to drag the Dodger Stadium infield in the fifth inning of a game. Afterwards, Lasorda yelled at them and sent Johnstone to pinch-hit the next inning as a punishment; however, Johnstone ended up hitting a home run. During the Dodgers' 1982 spring training, Johnstone locked Lasorda inside his motel room by tying his doorknob to a palm tree.

Once, during pre-game warm-ups, Johnstone climbed atop the Dodger dugout and, in full uniform, walked through the field boxes at Dodger Stadium to the concession stand and got a hot dog. Another time, he bolted from a taxicab on the gridlocked Golden State Freeway during a pregame traffic jam and began running in uniform toward the Stadium Way exit. Johnstone also once dressed up in Lasorda's uniform (with padding underneath) and ran out to the mound to talk to the pitcher while carrying Lasorda's book and a can of Slim Fast.

As a baseball announcer, Johnstone once covered a microphone with a scent of stale eggs then proceeded to interview Dave "Smoke" Stewart, Mickey Hatcher, and other players. While faking a pause for commercials during a TV interview with Yankee players Deion Sanders and Mel Hall, Johnstone tricked them into uncovering a restaurant bread basket containing a snake; both players jumped from their seats, provoking laughter all around.

Johnstone's 1984 Fleer baseball card #495 shows him wearing a Budweiser Brockabrella, an umbrella hat for which Lou Brock was a spokesman; Johnstone claimed the photo was not pre-planned and that Budweiser rewarded him with a case of complimentary beer each summer.

== Journalism career ==
Johnstone hosted blooper TV show The Lighter Side of Sports in the late 1980s. He worked as radio color commentator for the Yankees games on WABC (1989–1990, with John Sterling) and the Phillies games on WPHT (1992–1993).

He also co-wrote three books with sports columnist Rick Talley—Temporary Insanity, Over the Edge, and Some of My Best Friends Are Crazy—in which he described many of the pranks, along with other aspects of his career.

== Entertainment roles ==
Johnstone appeared in the movie The Naked Gun as a member of the Seattle Mariners in a game against the California Angels. Although he was a left-handed hitter throughout his career, Johnstone bats right-handed in the movie.

After the Dodgers' 1981 World Series victory, Johnstone and Dodger teammates Rick Monday (with whom he shared a birthday, service in the Marines, and stints with the A's, Cubs, and Dodgers), Jerry Reuss, and Steve Yeager appeared on Solid Gold and sang their own rendition of Queen's hit, We Are the Champions.

== Death ==
Johnstone died from complications of COVID-19 at a nursing home in Granada Hills, California, on September 26, 2020, during the COVID-19 pandemic; he was 74 years old. According to his daughter, Mary Jayne Sarah Johnstone, he had suffered from dementia in recent years.

== Career statistics ==
Years	Games	PA	AB	R	H	2B	3B	HR	RBI	BB	SO	AVG	OBP	SLG	FLD%
20	1748	5229	4703	578	1254	215	38	102	531	429	632	.267	.329	.394	.979

In the postseason, covering 14 games (one NLDS, four NLCS, two World Series) Johnstone batted .476 (10-for-21), with two runs scored, one double, one triple, one home run, and five runs batted in (RBI).

As a pinch hitter, although batting only .228 (92-404) in his MLB career, Johnstone hit 11 home runs along with 66 RBI in that role.

== Film appearances ==
- Body Slam (1986) - Booth Announcer
- The Naked Gun: From the Files of Police Squad! (1988) - Seattle First Up
