= Billy Wynne (baseball) =

American baseball player (born 1943)

- Pitcher
- Born: July 31, 1943 (age 83); Williamston, North Carolina, U.S.
- Batted: Left Threw: Right

MLB debut
- August 6, 1967, for the New York Mets

Last MLB appearance
- April 30, 1971, for the California Angels

MLB statistics
- Win–loss record: 8–11
- Earned run average: 4.33
- Strikeouts: 97
- Stats at Baseball Reference

Teams
- New York Mets (1967); Chicago White Sox (1968–1970); California Angels (1971)

Billy Vernon Wynne (born July 31, 1943) is an American former professional baseball player. He played in Major League Baseball as a right-handed pitcher from 1967 through 1971 for the New York Mets, Chicago White Sox and California Angels. During his playing career Wynne was measured at 6 feet 3 inches (1.91 m) tall and 205 pounds (93 kg).

== Early life ==
Wynne was born in Williamston, North Carolina, the same hometown as Baseball Hall of Fame member Gaylord Perry. He graduated from Williamston High School and then attended Pfeiffer University in Misenheimer, North Carolina.

== Baseball career ==
Wynne was signed by the New York Mets as an amateur free agent before the 1965 season. He made his major league debut at the age of 24 with the Mets on August 6, 1967. On December 15, 1967, the Mets traded Wynne along with Buddy Booker, Tommy Davis and Jack Fisher to the Chicago White Sox for Tommie Agee and Al Weis. Wynne won his first major league game at Milwaukee's County Stadium, but he didn't beat either the Braves or the Brewers. Pitching for the White Sox in a June 16, 1969, game in Milwaukee — the White Sox played a total of 20 "home games" in Milwaukee in 1968 and 1969 — Wynne defeated the Seattle Pilots, 8-3. After a campaign in which he was the winning pitcher only once in 12 appearances, he was dealt along with Ken Berry and Syd O'Brien from the White Sox to the Angels for Jay Johnstone, Tom Egan and Tom Bradley on November 30, 1970. He played in his final major league game with the Angels on April 30, 1971 at the age of 27. He retired with a career MLB record of 8–11 with a 4.33 ERA.
