= Tom Bradley (baseball) =

American baseball player and coach (born 1947)

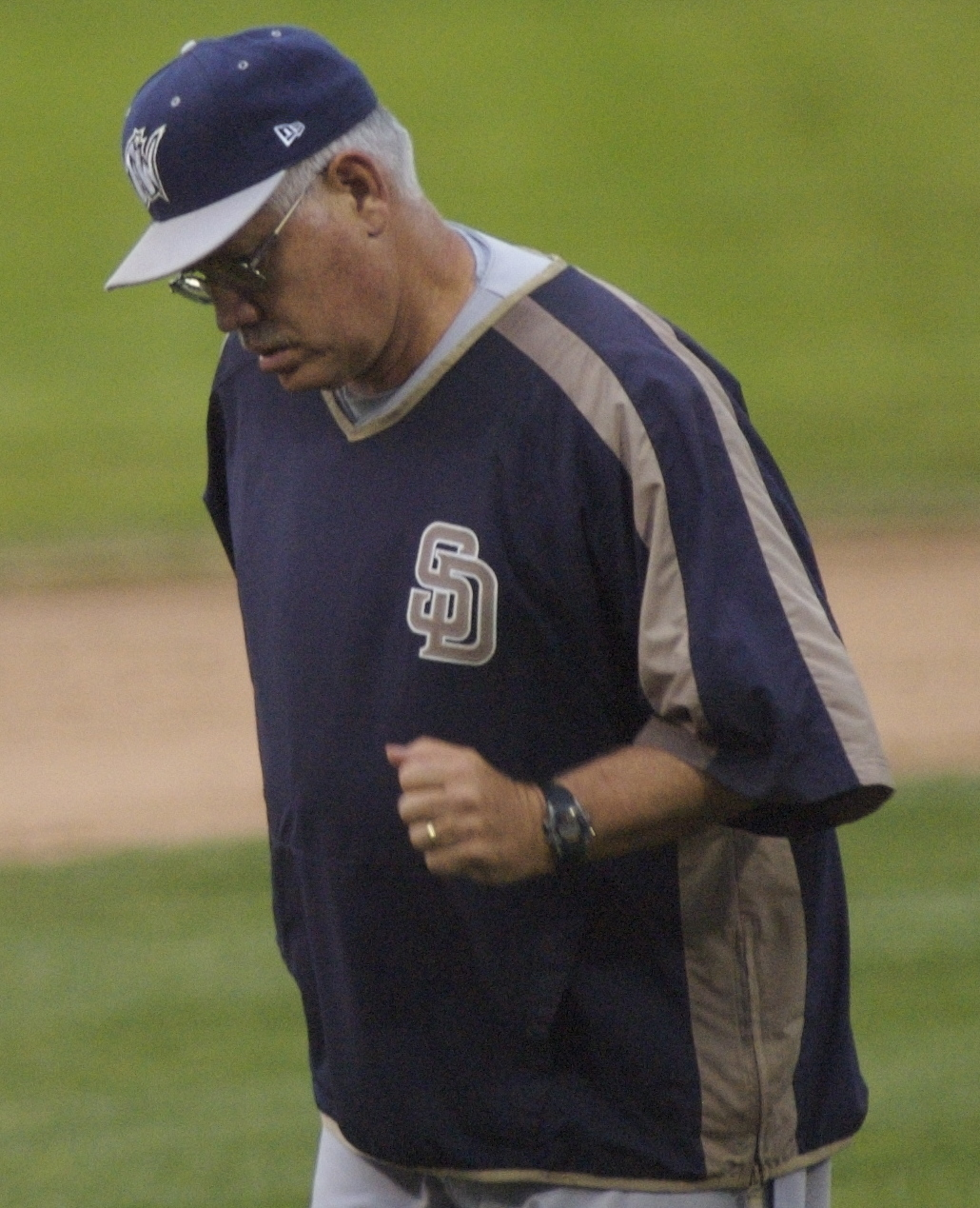
- Bradley in 2006
- Pitcher
- Born: March 16, 1947 (age 79); Asheville, North Carolina, U.S.
- Batted: Right Threw: Right

MLB debut
- September 9, 1969, for the California Angels

Last MLB appearance
- September 15, 1975, for the San Francisco Giants

MLB statistics
- Win–loss record: 55–61
- Earned run average: 3.72
- Strikeouts: 691
- Stats at Baseball Reference

Teams
- California Angels (1969–1970); Chicago White Sox (1971–1972); San Francisco Giants (1973–1975)

Thomas William Bradley (born March 16, 1947) is an American former professional baseball player and coach. He played in Major League Baseball as a right-handed pitcher from 1969 through 1975 for the California Angels, Chicago White Sox and San Francisco Giants.

== Career ==
Bradley was drafted out of the University of Maryland by the California Angels on June 7, 1968, in the 7th round of the 1968 Major League Baseball draft. He made his Major League debut at the age of 22 with the Angels on Sept. 9, 1969. It was not an auspicious one, Bradley being roughed up in a seven-run inning by the Minnesota Twins and taking the loss in an 11–7 defeat. He entered the game in the sixth inning and gave up a leadoff single to César Tovar and a two-run homer by Leo Cárdenas. With two more men on base after Rod Carew reached on an error, Tony Oliva hit a two-run double and Bradley was lifted from the game.

Bradley was traded along with Jay Johnstone and Tom Egan from the Angels to the Chicago White Sox for Ken Berry, Syd O'Brien and Billy Wynne on November 30, 1970. He promptly became one of the team's most reliable starting pitchers. Bradley's 1971 season included a 15–15 record and six shutouts, his 39 starts being the third-highest total in the American League that season. Tommy John thought Bradley would have had an even better year had pitching coach Johnny Sain not insisted he throw a slider. "Bradley began the 1971 season on fire. He was awesome for the first eight weeks, relying on his fastball and curveball. But after Sain got him to go to the slider more and more, he lost his fastball. He might have won 22 or 23 games that year, but finished at 15–15."

One of his most impressive starts came early in the season, when Bradley threw a four-hit shutout against the Oakland A's on April 17, 1971, at Comiskey Park, striking out 10, including Reggie Jackson three times.

After another 15-win season a year later, he was traded by the White Sox to the San Francisco Giants, a team that was in need of serious pitching help, for Ken Henderson and Steve Stone on November 29, 1972. Bradley had a 13–12 record in 1973, but finished his MLB career with the Giants two years later in 1975. He played in his final major league game on September 15, 1975, at the age of 28.

== Coaching ==
Bradley served as the head baseball coach at his alma mater, the University of Maryland, College Park, from 1991 to 2000. As coach, his Maryland Terrapins achieved a record of 243–306–5 (.439). His Atlantic Coast Conference (ACC) record stands at 57–173 (.248). He had more success coaching at Jacksonville University, where he coached the Dolphins. From 1979 to 1990, he compiled a 432–291–5 (.597) record.

In 2001, Bradley managed the Medicine Hat Blue Jays in the Pioneer League. He served as a pitching coach for the Midwest League's Lansing Lugnuts, a Blue Jays affiliate, in 2005. He remained in the Midwest League for the 2006 season, joining the San Diego Padres' affiliate, the Fort Wayne Wizards, as their pitching coach. Bradley spent the 2007 season as the pitching coach for the Padres's short-season Northwest League affiliate, the Eugene Emeralds. He returned to the Wizards in the same capacity in 2008.
