= Richie Moloney =

American baseball player (born 1950)

- Pitcher
- Born: June 7, 1950 (age 76); Brookline, Massachusetts, U.S.
- Batted: Right Threw: Right

MLB debut
- September 20, 1970, for the Chicago White Sox

Last MLB appearance
- September 20, 1970, for the Chicago White Sox

MLB statistics
- Win–loss record: 0–0
- Earned run average: 0.00
- Innings pitched: 1
- Stats at Baseball Reference

Teams
- Chicago White Sox (1970)

Richard Henry Moloney (born June 7, 1950), is an American former baseball player who pitched in the Major Leagues for one season in 1970 with the Chicago White Sox. He was the 3rd youngest player in the American league when he made his first and only appearance. He pitched one inning giving up two hits and striking out one (Jim Holt).
