= Syd O'Brien =

American baseball player (born 1944)

- Infielder
- Born: February 18, 1944 (age 81); Compton, California, U.S.
- Batted: Right Threw: Right

MLB debut
- April 15, 1969, for the Boston Red Sox

Last MLB appearance
- October 1, 1972, for the Milwaukee Brewers

MLB statistics
- Batting average: .230
- Home runs: 24
- Runs batted in: 100
- Stats at Baseball Reference

Teams
- Boston Red Sox (1969); Chicago White Sox (1970); California Angels (1971–1972); Milwaukee Brewers (1972)

Sydney Lloyd O'Brien (born February 18, 1944) is an American former professional baseball player. He played in Major League Baseball as an infielder from 1969 through 1972 for the Boston Red Sox, Chicago White Sox, California Angels and the Milwaukee Brewers. He played more games at third base than any other position, but also played a significant number of games at shortstop, second base, and first base. He batted and threw right-handed and was listed as 6 feet 1 inch (1.85 m) tall and 185 pounds (84 kg).

O'Brien was born in Compton, California graduated from Millikan High School in Long Beach, California. He then attended Long Beach City College and was signed by the Boston Red Sox as an amateur free agent in 1964, but was drafted out of the minors by the Kansas City Athletics in November 1964, only to be traded back to Boston two years later.

At the age of 25, O'Brien made his major league debut for Boston in 1969, pinch hitting for Fred Wenz in the bottom of the eighth inning in a game against the Baltimore Orioles. He finished the season with five triples, ranked ninth in the American League.

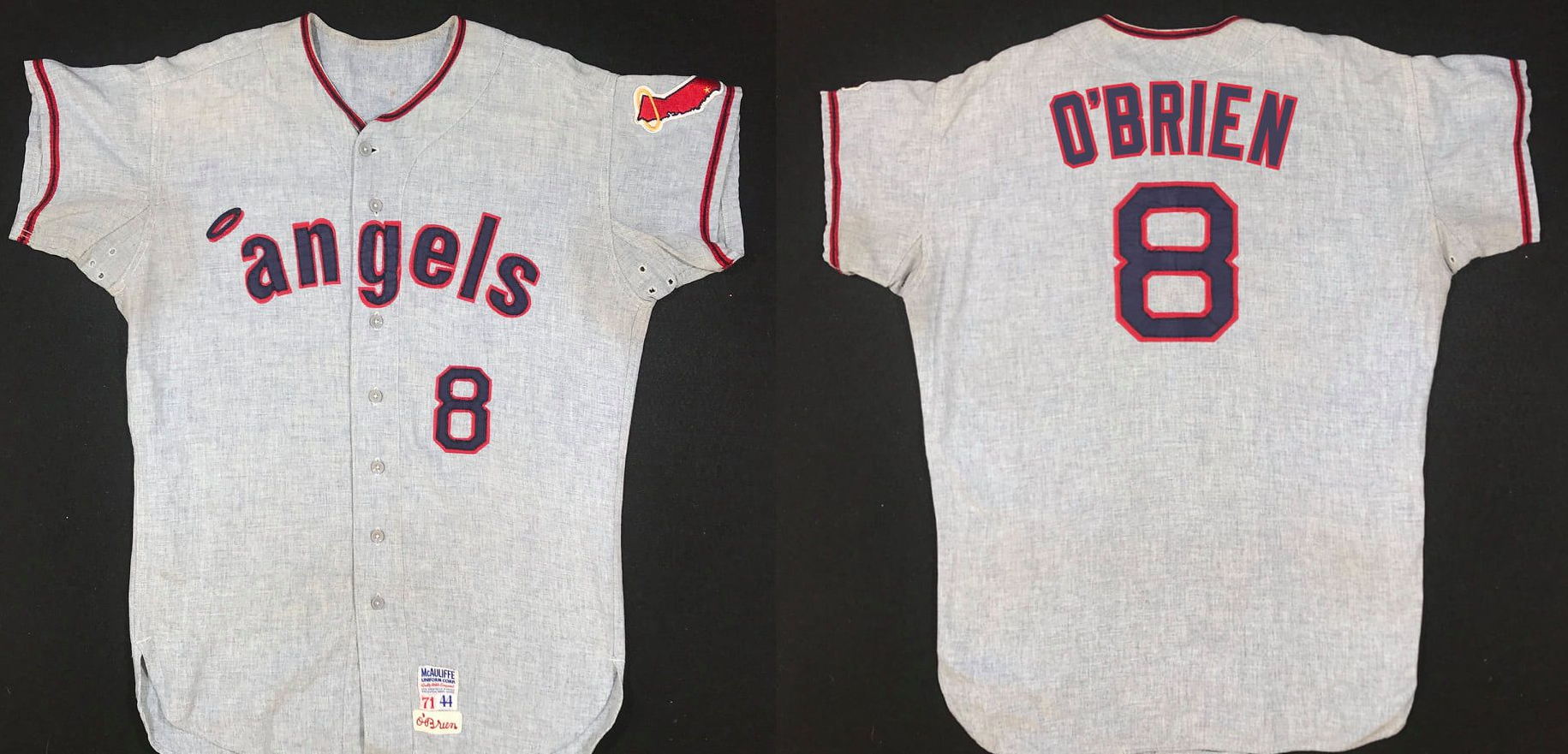
California Angels 1971 #8 Syd O'Brien game worn road jersey

After the 1969 season, the Red Sox traded O'Brien to the Chicago White Sox. He played in 121 games for the White Sox in 1970, the most he would play in a single season, with career highs in batting average, hits, runs batted in (RBI), runs scored, walks, and steals, while also pacing the poor-fielding club with a .948 fielding percentage.

After a campaign in which he batted .242 with 44 RBI and 8 home runs, O'Brien was dealt along with Ken Berry and Billy Wynne from the White Sox to the California Angels for Jay Johnstone, Tom Egan and Tom Bradley on November 30, 1970. He would play a season and a half primarily as a shortstop. In the middle of the 1972 season, he was traded to the Milwaukee Brewers, where he finished his career.
