= Tom Egan =

American baseball player (born 1988)

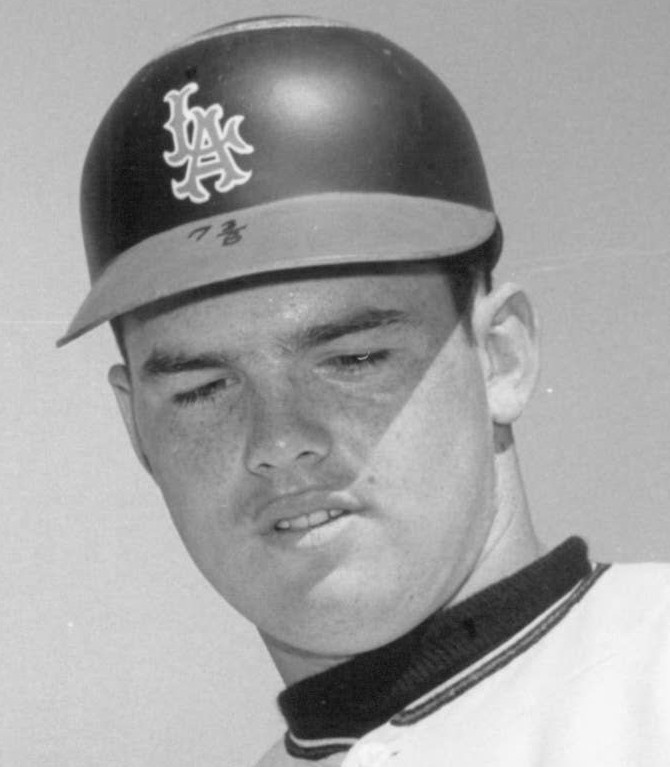
- Catcher
- Born: June 9, 1946 (age 80); Los Angeles, California, U.S.
- Batted: Right Threw: Right

MLB debut
- May 27, 1965, for the Los Angeles Angels

Last MLB appearance
- June 15, 1975, for the California Angels

MLB statistics
- Batting average: .200
- Home runs: 22
- Runs batted in: 91
- Stats at Baseball Reference

Teams
- Los Angeles / California Angels (1965–1970); Chicago White Sox (1971–1972); California Angels (1974–1975)

Thomas Patrick Egan (born June 9, 1946) is an American former professional baseball player. He played in Major League Baseball as a catcher from 1965 through 1975 for the California Angels and the Chicago White Sox. On September 28, 1974, he caught Nolan Ryan's third no-hitter. Egan threw and batted right-handed, stood 6 feet 4 inches (1.93 m) tall and weighed 218 pounds (99 kg).

== Baseball career ==
Born in Los Angeles, he attended El Rancho High School in Pico Rivera, California, and signed to a $100,000 bonus contract by the Angels in 1964. He was just 18 years old when he made his Major League debut on May 27, 1965. Before a crowd of only 1,898 in Washington, D.C., he was the last batter of the Angels' game against the Washington Senators, representing the tying run as the Angels trailed 9–6 with two men on base. Egan struck out against Ron Kline to end the game.

After arguably his best season in 1970, he was traded along with Jay Johnstone and Tom Bradley from the Angels to the White Sox for Ken Berry, Syd O'Brien and Billy Wynne on November 30, 1970. He returned to the Angels three years later when he was selected from the Iowa Oaks in the Rule 5 draft on December 3, 1973. While he ended up with a mere .200 lifetime batting average, Egan's career highlight occurred in the final week of the 1974 season.

Given the assignment to catch Nolan Ryan, a future Hall of Famer, in a Sept. 24 game at Anaheim against the Minnesota Twins, he was behind the plate when Ryan nailed down the third no-hitter of his career. With two out in the ninth inning, Harmon Killebrew, another future Hall of Famer, came up for the Twins to pinch-hit. Ryan walked him, then fanned Eric Soderholm to end the game, Ryan's 15th strikeout of the day.

Egan would be released by the Angels in 1975 and his career came to an end.
