= Ron Lolich =

American baseball player (born 1946)

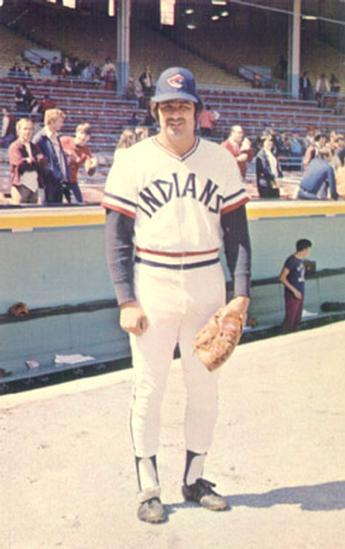
- Right fielder
- Born: September 19, 1946 (age 80); Portland, Oregon, U.S.
- Batted: Right Threw: Right

MLB debut
- July 18, 1971, for the Chicago White Sox

Last MLB appearance
- September 28, 1973, for the Cleveland Indians

MLB statistics
- Batting average: .211
- Home runs: 4
- Runs batted in: 23
- Stats at Baseball Reference

Teams
- Chicago White Sox (1971); Cleveland Indians (1972–1973); Nankai Hawks (1974–1975); Osaka Kintetsu Buffaloes (1976)

Ronald John Lolich (/ˈloʊlɪtʃ/ LOH-litch; born September 19, 1946) is an American former professional baseball right fielder. He played in Major League Baseball (MLB) for the Chicago White Sox in 1971 and the Cleveland Indians from 1972 to 1973. The cousin of Major League pitcher Mickey Lolich, Ron had a nine-year professional career. He threw and batted right-handed, stood 6 feet 1 inch (1.85 m) tall and weighed 185 pounds (84 kg).

Lolich was an accomplished minor league hitter — batting .281 in 745 games (his best season, 1972, coming with his hometown Portland Beavers of the Pacific Coast League) — but he collected only 48 Major League hits in 87 games played. With only 4 all-time MLB home runs, Ron is on the very short list of MLB players who have hit a walk-off grand slam home run when trailing by exactly 3 runs. He accomplished the feat on April 22, 1973, to give the Indians an 8–7 win over the Boston Red Sox.

== See also ==
- List of Major League Baseball ultimate grand slams
