= Rich McKinney =

American baseball player (born 1946)

- Infielder
- Born: November 22, 1946 (age 79); Piqua, Ohio, U.S.
- Batted: Right Threw: Right

MLB debut
- June 26, 1970, for the Chicago White Sox

Last MLB appearance
- October 2, 1977, for the Oakland Athletics

MLB statistics
- Batting average: .225
- Home runs: 20
- Runs batted in: 100
- Stats at Baseball Reference

Teams
- Chicago White Sox (1970–1971); New York Yankees (1972); Oakland Athletics (1973–1975, 1977)

Charles Richard McKinney (born November 22, 1946) is an American former professional baseball player. He played all or part of seven seasons in Major League Baseball (MLB) between 1970 and 1977. Originally an infielder when he came up with the Chicago White Sox, he became more of a utility player as his career progressed.

== Chicago White Sox ==
After playing college baseball at Ohio University, McKinney was selected in the first round (14th overall) of the 1968 Major League Baseball draft by the Chicago White Sox. He was assigned to the Double-A Evansville White Sox, and batted .261 with seven home runs and 37 runs batted in over 86 games at shortstop.

The following season, McKinney spent most of the year injured. He split the 1969 season between the Double-A Columbus White Sox and the Triple-A Tucson Toros, playing just 11 games at each level. While at Columbus, he played in the outfield for the first time in his professional career, appearing in six games there.

McKinney started the 1970 season with Tucson, where he batted .303 with six home runs and 41 RBIs in 62 games. He was called up to the major league White Sox in June, making his debut on June 26 against the Minnesota Twins. Despite never having played the position professionally, he started the game at third base, handling both chances he had without incident. He scored his first major league run in the second after reaching on a César Tovar error, and got his first major league hit off Jim Kaat in the fifth inning.

He hit his first major league home run on September 21 off the Kansas City Royals' Jim York, and proceeded to hit home runs in his next three games to finish the season with four. He finished the year batting just .168 against major league pitching while splitting his time between third base and shortstop.

McKinney had a career year for the White Sox in 1971, setting career highs in many categories including batting average (.271), home runs (8) and RBIs (46). Overall, he played in 114 games, mostly at second base and in right field.

== New York Yankees ==
McKinney was traded from the White Sox to the New York Yankees for Stan Bahnsen at the Winter Meetings on December 2, 1971. Almost immediately after the Yankees acquired him, while playing winter ball, he suffered second-degree burns at a beach party in Puerto Rico. From there, things only got worse. He began the 1972 season as the Yankees regular third baseman, but was unable to handle the "hot corner," committing a record tying four errors in an 11-7 loss to the Boston Red Sox at Fenway Park. After batting .216 with one home run and five RBIs through May, he lost his starting job to rookie Celerino Sánchez. He was demoted to the Triple-A Syracuse Chiefs, where he batted .299 with sixteen home runs and 53 RBIs to earn a second chance with the Yankees that September, compiling two hits in ten at bats upon his return. McKinney was sent to the Oakland Athletics on December 1, 1972, to complete a deal made a week prior on November 24 in which the Yankees acquired Matty Alou for Rob Gardner.

== Oakland A's ==
McKinney started the year with Oakland, where he was mostly used as a pinch hitter. He was demoted to the Toros, which were now an A's farm club, in late July, but returned to the majors in September. He finished the year batting .246 in 48 games.

Over the next two seasons, McKinney spent most of his time with Tucson, where he was converted into a full-time outfielder. Although he batted .285 in 1974 and .297 in 1975, he played just 5 and 8 games in the majors respectively during those seasons. He spent the entire 1976 season with Tucson, batting .317 with career highs in home runs (22) and RBI (95), but did not get a call to the majors.

McKinney was given one last shot in 1977 when the A's, with Charlie Finley having traded off most of their stars, turned him into a first baseman, although he also played 18 games at DH. He spent nearly the entire season in Oakland, with only a brief demotion to the San Jose Missions in late June. While McKinney finally began hitting with some power, with 6 home runs in just 189 at bats, his batting average sunk to .177, and his major league career was over.
