= Bill Melton =

American baseball player and commentator (1945–2024)

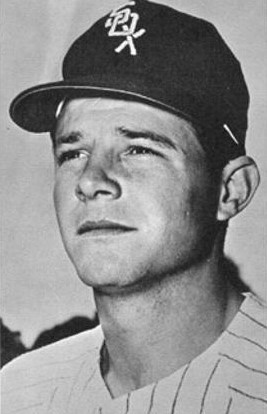
- Melton in 1970
- Third baseman
- Born: July 7, 1945; Gulfport, Mississippi, U.S.
- Died: December 5, 2024 (aged 79); Phoenix, Arizona, U.S.
- Batted: Right Threw: Right

MLB debut
- May 4, 1968, for the Chicago White Sox

Last MLB appearance
- August 30, 1977, for the Cleveland Indians

MLB statistics
- Batting average: .253
- Home runs: 160
- Runs batted in: 591
- Stats at Baseball Reference

Teams
- Chicago White Sox (1968–1975); California Angels (1976); Cleveland Indians (1977)

Career highlights and awards
- All-Star (1971); AL home run leader (1971)

William Edwin Melton (July 7, 1945 – December 5, 2024), nicknamed "Beltin' Bill" and "Beltin' Melton", was an American professional baseball third baseman and television sports commentator. He played in Major League Baseball from 1968 through 1977, most prominently as a member of the Chicago White Sox where he was the 1971 American League home run champion and named to the 1971 American League All-Star team. He also played for the California Angels and Cleveland Indians. He was a commentator for NBC Sports Chicago White Sox broadcasts.

== Early life and college ==
Melton was born on July 7, 1945, in Gulfport, Mississippi. He attended Duarte High School in Duarte, California, graduating in 1963. He suffered from Osgood-Schlatter's disease, and spent weeks in a cast during his sophomore year. He was told not to play sports for at least two years, but he disregarded that advice.

He played on the football and basketball teams at Duarte, but did not play high school baseball. The senior class voted Melton its "Best Looking" male student, and he was an editor on the school's newspaper.

He attended Citrus College in Glendora, California. He chose to play baseball at Citrus, not football or basketball. Chicago White Sox scout Hollis "Sloppy" Thurston saw Melton play baseball at Citrus.

== Baseball career ==
Melton was signed by the White Sox as a minor league free agent prior to the 1964 season, and was assigned to the Sarasota White Sox, a Rookie League team.

=== Minor leagues ===
In 1964, Melton played in 39 Rookie League games as an outfielder and second baseman, with a .286 batting average and 10 home runs in 112 at bats, and a .928 fielding percentage. In 1965, he was assigned to the Single-A Sarasota Sun Sox of the Florida State League. He played in the outfield, with a .972 fielding percentage, but hit .196 with only six home runs in 393 at bats. He also played 38 games in the Florida Instructional League.

In 1966, he was assigned to the Florida Instructional League again, where he batted .331 with two home runs in 47 games. That same year, he played in 97 games for the Single-A Fox Cities Foxes, hitting .284, with 12 home runs, 26 doubles and 67 runs batted in (RBI) in 328 at bats. He had a .983 fielding percentage in 18 games at first base, and .955 fielding percentage in 82 outfield games. He played the 1967 season for the Double-A Evansville White Sox, hitting .251 with only nine home runs in 134 games; playing first base, third base and in the outfield. This was his first minor league season playing third base, where he had a .931 fielding percentage in 130 games played at third.

In 1968, he played at third base and in the outfield for the Triple-A Hawaii Islanders, the White Sox affiliate in the Pacific Coast League, batting .257 with 10 home runs in 63 games. He also played for the Triple-A Syracuse Chiefs of the International League, while on loan to the New York Yankees organization in 1968; hitting .279 in 45 games with five home runs. He had a .908 fielding percentage at third base in 60 games for Hawaii, but a .974 fielding percentage in 32 games at third base for Syracuse.

At each level, he displayed the two characteristics that he would be known for throughout his playing career: a powerful bat and questionable fielding. Los Angeles Times writer Dave Distel stated in 1971, observing that Melton hit only 44 home runs in five minor league seasons, "Through his first five years in professional baseball, [Melton] did not look much like the hitter who would someday be the White Sox' first home run champion". Other sources indicate he hit 42 home runs in five minor league seasons.

=== Chicago White Sox ===
Melton made his major league debut on May 4, 1968, after he was called up from Hawaii to the White Sox to replace third baseman Ken Boyer, who the team had just released. He played 17 games for the White Sox through May 21, and then went back to Hawaii in late May, when the White Sox called up Islander third baseman Dick Kenworthy to replace Melton. Melton had hit only .204 with three RBIs and no home runs in 17 games. Melton played Triple-A ball until September, when he returned to the White Sox. In the 17 games he played from September 10-29 with the White Sox, Melton raised his average from .204 to .266 on the season. He hit two home runs with 13 RBIs during September. Melton won a September 17 game against the Oakland Athletics with a two-run home run.

Melton began the 1969 season with the White Sox, where he was a mainstay at third for the White Sox for the next seven years. Melton led the White Sox in home runs in 1969 with 23, and had a .255 batting average with 87 RBI. He had never had more than 15 home runs or 72 RBIs in any minor league season. He played in 148 games at third base with a .952 fielding percentage. He had the third most errors committed at third base in the American League (AL) (22), but also was fourth in assists (322) and tied for third in double plays (36).

Melton came into his own offensively in 1970, hitting 33 home runs (6th best in the AL), again leading the team and marking the first time a White Sox slugger had eclipsed the 30-home run mark in the history of the franchise. He had a career high 96 RBIs (9th best in the AL) and a .488 slugging percentage (10th best in the AL). He started 70 games in the outfield where he had 124 chances without a fielding error, and 70 games at third base, with .926 fielding percentage. His fielding percentage at third base was the worst in the AL for anyone playing at least 70 games at third base. In a May 1970 game against the Baltimore Orioles, he suffered a broken nose when he missed catching a pop up.

In 1971, Melton had arguably his best season as he made the AL All-Star Team and led the American League with 33 home runs – the first time a White Sox player had led the league in home runs. Melton was the backup to Brooks Robinson at third base for the All-Star Game, and did not play in the game. He had a .269 batting average (second best of his career), and a career high .492 slugging percentage. He played third base full time (148 games) and had a career best .968 fielding percentage at third base, fourth best in the AL. Melton finished 13th in AL Most Valuable Player voting in 1971.

Melton's 1972 playing season ended in June with two herniated discs resulting from trying to break his son's fall from their garage roof in late 1971. While he was still playing, Melton experienced levels of pain that almost left him unconscious. His season ended just weeks before his 27th birthday. He had played in only 57 games, with a .245 batting average and seven home runs.

Melton underwent an experimental therapy in lieu of surgery, chemonucleolysis, where he was injected with the enzyme chymopapain to dissolve the disc. Two years later, the Food and Drug Administration barred this treatment because Melton had been given a second injection; which Melton said had helped significantly in giving him pain relief. He still had sciatic nerve pain for the next 3½ months after the treatment, as he was healing. The injury sapped his power such that he would not again hit more than 21 home runs in a year.

Melton came back to play 152 games in 1973, and was even of the cover of Sports Illustrated early in the year. He played 151 games at third base, the second most games of his career for a single season. His .277 batting average was a career-best, and his .953 fielding percentage at third base was the second best in his career. His home run total fell to 20, but he had 87 RBIs and a career-best 83 runs scored. Among third baseman with at least 300 chances, he was tied for 7th in AL fielding percentage leaders with Graig Nettles, a two-time Gold Glove winner.

In June of 1974, Melton said he did not have back pain, and was diving at third base and sliding as a base runner without concern. He played in 136 games (123 at third base), hitting 21 home runs with a .242 batting average, but only 63 RBIs. He had a .939 fielding percentage, worst in the league among third basemen playing over 100 games, and leading AL third basemen in errors with 24. In 1975, he hit .240 with only 15 home runs, but had 70 RBIs. He again led the AL in errors by a third baseman (26), and had a .945 fielding percentage, second worst among AL third basemen playing over 100 games.

Before his back problems, Melton was a popular player, but when his play began to suffer due to his back injury, he became the target of fans and media. Melton especially drew the ire of White Sox broadcaster Harry Caray, who often railed against Beltin' Bill for his fielding problems. Melton and Caray's animus toward each other became public in 1975, after Caray criticized Melton's base running on a particular play. Melton could accept to some degree Caray commenting on the quality of his play, but not on his motivation or heart as a player. He was quoted as calling Caray "'a no-good sonuvabee" in a hotel lobby, and stating that "'If he's a fair broadcaster, I'm a Hindu mystic.'"

In his eight years with the White Sox, Melton had 154 home runs, 535 RBIs and a .258 batting average. Never good with the glove, finishing either third or fourth in the league for errors by a third baseman every year except his rookie and injury-shortened 1972 seasons, Melton led the league with 24 errors in 1974 and 26 in 1975. However, he was also in the top five in assists by a third baseman in 1969, 1971, and 1973.

=== California Angels and Cleveland Indians ===
On December 11, 1975 Melton was traded along with Steve Dunning from the White Sox to the California Angels for Jim Spencer and Morris Nettles. Expected to become the new designated hitter, Melton was the second right-handed power batter along with Bobby Bonds to have been obtained by the Angels that day. His production continued to decrease as he hit .208 with 6 home runs in 118 games and he clashed with the manager Dick Williams. Following the 1976 season, he was traded again, this time to the Cleveland Indians, for a player to be named later (ultimately relief pitcher Stan Perzanowski) and cash. After appearing in only 50 games for the Indians in 1977, hitting only .241 with no home runs, he retired following the season.

At the time of his retirement, Melton was the White Sox all-time home run leader with 154. Harold Baines passed him in 1987 and entering the 2025 season he ranks ninth on the club's all-time list.

== Career statistics ==
In 1,144 games over 10 seasons, Melton compiled a .253 batting average (1,004-for-3,971) with 496 runs, 162 doubles, 9 triples, 160 home runs, 591 RBIs, 479 base on balls, 669 strikeouts, a .337 on-base percentage, and a .419 slugging percentage. Defensively, he recorded a .956 fielding percentage at third base, first base, and right field; with a .949 fielding percentage as a third baseman.

== Post–playing career ==
After working with his father manufacturing skateboard wheels and becoming a real estate agent following retirement, Melton took a position as a community relations representative and part-time scout for the White Sox in 1992. The next year, Melton was asked by White Sox GM Ron Schueler to work with NBA superstar Michael Jordan on his batting swing. Jordan had recently retired from the NBA and was trying to make a go at in professional baseball.

=== Broadcaster ===
At the time of Melton's death in 2024, White Sox chairman Jerry Reinsdorf described Melton as having two great careers with the White Sox, first as a player and then as a broadcaster doing pre- and postgame television analysis of White Sox games. Melton was known for being blunt, outspoken and passionate. His broadcast career with the White Sox ran for more than 20 years. In 1998, Melton was hired by WGN to be a White Sox pre- and postgame television analyst. In 2005, he was hired by Comcast SportsNet Chicago in a similar position.

== Death ==
Melton died following a brief illness in Phoenix, Arizona, on December 5, 2024, at the age of 79.

== See also ==
- List of Major League Baseball annual home run leaders
