= Bob Spence =

American baseball player (born 1946)

- First baseman
- Born: February 10, 1946 (age 79); San Diego, California
- Batted: Left Threw: Right

MLB debut
- September 5, 1969, for the Chicago White Sox

Last MLB appearance
- September 6, 1971, for the Chicago White Sox

MLB statistics
- Batting average: .202
- Home runs: 4
- Runs batted in: 19
- Stats at Baseball Reference

Teams
- Chicago White Sox (1969–1971)

John Robert (Bob) Spence (born February 10, 1946) is a former Major League Baseball player. Spence played for the Chicago White Sox from 1969 to 1971. He batted left and threw right-handed.

He was drafted by the White Sox in the 1st round (4th overall pick) of the 1967 amateur draft.

He attended St. Augustine High School in San Diego, California and graduated in 1964. Following his retirement from baseball, he returned to St. Augustine as a teacher.
