= Jim Magnuson =

American baseball player (1946–1991)

- Pitcher
- Born: August 18, 1946; Marinette, Wisconsin, U.S.
- Died: May 30, 1991 (aged 44); Green Bay, Wisconsin, U.S.
- Batted: Right Threw: Left

MLB debut
- June 28, 1970, for the Chicago White Sox

Last MLB appearance
- May 27, 1973, for the New York Yankees

MLB statistics
- Win–loss record: 2–7
- Earned run average: 4.59
- Strikeouts: 40
- Stats at Baseball Reference

Teams
- Chicago White Sox (1970–1971); New York Yankees (1973)

James Robert Magnuson (August 18, 1946 – May 30, 1991) was an American Major League Baseball pitcher who played in 1970 and 1971 with the Chicago White Sox and in 1973 with the New York Yankees. He batted right and threw left-handed. Magnuson had a 2–7 record in 36 career games.

== Personal life ==
Magnuson was born in Marinette, Wisconsin, the oldest of five children. His parents were Harry J. and Florence I. Magnuson of Marinette. An alumnus of the University of Wisconsin–Oshkosh, Magnuson was married with two children. He died of alcohol poisoning in Green Bay, Wisconsin in 1991.
