= Joe Jones (baseball) =

- Coach
- Born: December 13, 1941; Lebanon, Tennessee, U.S.
- Died: March 23, 2023 (aged 81); Sarasota, Florida, U.S.
- Batted: Right Threw: Right

Teams
- Kansas City Royals (1987; 1992; 2005); Pittsburgh Pirates (1997–2000)

Joseph Carmack Jones Jr. (December 13, 1941 – March 23, 2023) was an American professional baseball player, coach and manager. He spent all or parts of seven seasons in Major League Baseball as a coach for the Kansas City Royals (1987; 1992; 2005) and Pittsburgh Pirates (1997–2000).

A second baseman during his active career, Jones stood 5 feet 9 inches (1.75 m) tall and weighed 155 pounds (70 kg); he threw and batted right-handed. A native of Lebanon, Tennessee, he graduated from Southeastern High School, Detroit, Michigan, and played varsity baseball at the University of Michigan, where he earned a degree in education. He was signed by the Chicago White Sox in 1963 and played for seven seasons in the ChiSox' farm system, appearing in 813 minor league games, with 773 hits in 3,027 at bats for a career batting average of .255. He also pitched one inning for the Tidewater Tides in 1965, giving up one run for an earned run average of 9.00, but was credited with the win. Most of Jones' playing career occurred at the Class A level; he appeared in one game in Triple-A, for the 1967 Indianapolis Indians of the Pacific Coast League, batting five times with one hit, a single.

Jones then served as a minor league manager from 1970 through 1983, leaving the White Sox' organization for the Royals' system in 1979. His managerial record was 629 wins and 545 losses, for a .536 winning percentage in 1,178 games. Twelve of those 14 seasons were spent in the Rookie-level Gulf Coast League. From 1984–86, Jones was the Royals' field coordinator of minor league instruction, leading to the first of his three separate terms as a member of Kansas City's Major League coaching staff.

In 1987, Jones served as first-base coach for skippers Billy Gardner and John Wathan, then resumed his former role as field coordinator from 1988 through 1996—a nine-year tenure interrupted by service as interim bench coach in 1992 after Glenn Ezell required emergency surgery to repair an aneurysm. From 1997 through early June 2000, Jones was the first-base coach on the Major League staff of Pirates' manager Gene Lamont, a former colleague from the Royals' organization. But Jones was released, along with third-base coach Jack Lind, on June 5, 2000, during a shakeup of Lamont's top aides.

Jones then returned to the Royals in 2001 as coordinator of instruction, serving for four seasons in that role, until one final MLB term in 2005 as the Royals' first-base coach. He then worked as a special assistant for player development in the Royals' system in 2006–07.

Joe Jones died at age 81 on March 23, 2023, survived by his wife of 60 years, two sons, four grandchildren, six great-grandchildren, sister, and nephew.
