= Dennis O'Toole =

American baseball player (born 1949)

- Pitcher
- Born: March 13, 1949 (age 76); Chicago, Illinois, U.S.
- Batted: Right Threw: Right

MLB debut
- September 8, 1969, for the Chicago White Sox

Last MLB appearance
- June 23, 1973, for the Chicago White Sox

MLB statistics
- Win–loss record: 0–0
- Earned run average: 5.04
- Innings: 30 1/3
- Stats at Baseball Reference

Teams
- Chicago White Sox (1969–1973)

Dennis Joseph O'Toole (born March 13, 1949) is an American former professional baseball player. A right-handed relief pitcher and the younger brother (by 12 years) of 1963 National League All-Star lefthander Jim O'Toole, Dennis appeared in 15 Major League games spread over five seasons (1969–1973) for the Chicago White Sox. He stood 6 feet 3 inches (1.91 m) tall and weighed 195 pounds (88 kg).

In 30 1/3 MLB innings pitched, O'Toole gave up 43 hits and ten bases on balls, with 22 strikeouts and no saves. He yielded 17 earned runs for a career ERA of 5.04. He compiled a 53–39 (3.66) mark in 211 minor league games, mostly in the White Sox' farm system, over nine seasons (1967–1975). His MLB career did not overlap with Jim's, who hurled his last big league game with the ChiSox over two years before Dennis' debut.

O'Toole also played winter baseball in the Mexican Pacific League for two seasons with the Naranjeros de Hermosillo.
