= Lee Richard =

American baseball player (1948–2023)

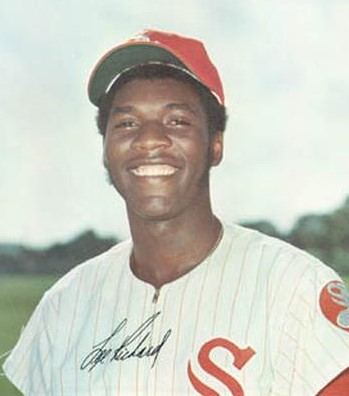
- Shortstop
- Born: September 18, 1948; Lafayette, Louisiana, U.S.
- Died: August 6, 2023 (aged 74); Waco, Texas, U.S.
- Batted: Right Threw: Right

MLB debut
- April 7, 1971, for the Chicago White Sox

Last MLB appearance
- October 3, 1976, for the St. Louis Cardinals

MLB statistics
- Batting average: .209
- Home runs: 2
- Runs batted in: 29
- Stats at Baseball Reference

Teams
- Chicago White Sox (1971–1972, 1974–1975); St. Louis Cardinals (1976)

Lee Edward "BeeBee" Richard (September 18, 1948 – August 6, 2023) was an American Major League Baseball player.

== Playing career ==
He played all or part of five seasons in the majors, between 1971 and 1976, for the Chicago White Sox and St. Louis Cardinals. He played primarily at shortstop, especially early in his career, but his defense was poor, and he later appeared more as a second baseman or third baseman. He was traded from the White Sox to the Cardinals for Buddy Bradford and Greg Terlecky on December 12, 1975.
