= List of professional sports families =

This is a list of all familial relations in professional sports.

== Parents and children ==
Parent	Children	Sport(s)	Country of origin
Cor van Aanholt	Philipine van Aanholt, Odile van Aanholt	Sailing	Netherlands Antilles (Curaçao); Aruba; Netherlands
	Brenden Aaronson, Paxten Aaronson	Association football	United States
Mary Abbott	Margaret Abbott	Golf	United States
	Hifumi Abe, Uta Abe	Judo	Japan
	Tammy Abraham, Timmy Abraham	Association football	United Kingdom (England)
	Paul Accola, Martina Accola	Alpine skiing	Switzerland
	Achmad Kurniawan, Kurnia Meiga	Association football	Indonesia
	Valerie Adams, Steven Adams	Shot put / Basketball	New Zealand
Cláudio Adão	Felipe Adão	Association football	Brazil
Andre Agassi, Steffi Graf	Jaden Agassi	Tennis; Baseball	United States; Germany
	Marija Agbaba, Jelena Agbaba	Handball	Serbia
Óscar Aguirregaray	Matías Aguirregaray	Association football	Uruguay
Ahn Jae-hyung, Jiao Zhimin	An Byeong-hun	Table tennis, Golf	South Korea
	Veronika Aigner, Barbara Aigner, Johannes Aigner	Para-alpine skiing	Austria
	Steve Aizlewood, Mark Aizlewood	Association football	United Kingdom (Wales)
	Julian Alaphilippe, Bryan Alaphilippe	Cycle sport	France
Louie Alas	Kevin Alas, Junjun Alas	Basketball	Philippines
	Nigel Albon, Mark Albon	Motorsport	United Kingdom (England)
Nigel Albon	Alexander Albon	Auto racing	United Kingdom (England); Thailand
Virgilijus Alekna	Mykolas Alekna	Discus throw	Lithuania
Svetlana Alekseeva	Elena Kustarova	Figure skating	Russia
Jean Alesi	Giuliano Alesi	Motorsport	France
	Anna-Maria Alexandri, Eirini-Marina Alexandri, Vasiliki Alexandri (triplets)	Synchronised swimming	Austria
	Muhammad Ali, Rahaman Ali	Boxing	United States
Muhammad Ali	Laila Ali	Boxing	United States
Hasney Aljofree	Sonny Aljofree	Association football	United Kingdom (England)
Joe Allen (great-grandfather) Bobby Allen (grandfather)	Jacob Allen (father) Logan Schuchart. (grandfather)	Auto racing	United States
Mark Alleyne	Max Alleyne	Cricket; Association football	United Kingdom (England)
Bobby Allison	Davey Allison, Clifford Allison	Stock car racing	United States
Jen Allred	Shayna Powless, Neilson Powless	Long-distance running Cycle sport	United States
	Jean-Marie Alméras, Jacques Alméras	Motorsport	France
Marquitos Alonso	Marcos Alonso Peña	Association football	Spain
Marcos Alonso Peña	Marcos Alonso Mendoza	Association football	Spain
Periko Alonso	Xabi Alonso, Mikel Alonso	Association football	Spain
Luc Alphand	Estelle Alphand	Alpine skiing	France; Sweden
	Hamit Altıntop, Halil Altıntop	Association football	Turkey
	Eniola Aluko, Sone Aluko	Association football	United Kingdom (England); Nigeria
	Pedro Amat Fontanals (in Spanish), Jaime Amat Fontanals (in Spanish), Francisco Amat Fontanals (in Spanish), Juan Amat Fontanals (in Spanish)	Field hockey	Spain
Jaime Amat Fontanals (in Spanish)	Santi Amat, Santi Freixa (cousin)	Field hockey	Spain
Francisco Amat Fontanals (in Spanish)	Pol Amat, Santi Freixa (cousin)	Field hockey	Spain
Sébastien Amiez	Steven Amiez	Alpine skiing	France
	Al-Farouq Aminu, Alade Aminu	Basketball	Nigeria; United States
Lala Amarnath	Mohinder Amarnath, Surinder Amarnath, Rajinder Amarnath	Cricket	India
	Anand Amritraj, Vijay Amritraj	Tennis	India
Anand Amritraj	Stephen Amritraj	Tennis	India; United States
Vijay Amritraj	Prakash Amritraj	Tennis	India
Kwame Ampadu	Ethan Ampadu	Association football	Ireland; United Kingdom (Wales)
Carlo Ancelotti	Davide Ancelotti	Association football	Italy
	Ivica Ančić, Mario Ančić, Sanja Ančić	Tennis	Croatia
	Asbjørn Kragh Andersen, Søren Kragh Andersen	Cycle sport	Denmark
Dennis Anderson	Adam Anderson, Ryan Anderson, Krysten Anderson	Monster truck	United States
Viv Anderson	Freddie Anderson	Association football	United Kingdom (England); United States
Roy Andersson	Patrik Andersson, Daniel Andersson	Association football	Sweden
	Erika Andreeva, Mirra Andreeva	Tennis	Russia
Andretti family		Auto racing	Italy; United States
Jon Andrews	Ellesse Andrews	Track cycling	New Zealand
Jesús Angoy	Jesjua Angoy-Cruyff	Association football / American football	Spain
Vyacheslav Anisin Irina Cherniaeva	Marina Anissina, Mikhail Anisin	Ice hockey / Figure skating	Russia
Anoaʻi family		Professional wrestling	American Samoa; Samoa; United States; Canada
Andy Ansah	Zak Ansah	Association football	United Kingdom(England)
	Faisal Antar, Roda Antar	Association football	Lebanon
	Giannis Antetokounmpo, Thanasis Antetokounmpo, Kostas Antetokounmpo, Alex Antetokounmpo	Basketball	Greece
Marco Antonelli	Kimi Antonelli	Motorsport	Italy
Aiva Aparjode	Kristers Aparjods, Kendija Aparjode	Luge	Latvia
Marlou Aquino	Matthew Aquino	Basketball	Philippines / Japan
Franjo Arapović	Marko Arapović	Basketball	Croatia
Hasson Arbubakrr	Hassan Whiteside	American football / Basketball	United States
	Joaquín Arcega, José Arcega, Fernando Arcega	Basketball	Spain
Joaquín Arcega	J. J. Arcega-Whiteside	Basketball, American football	Spain
	John Archibald, Katie Archibald	Cycle sport	United Kingdom (Scotland)
Alun Armstrong	Luke Armstrong	Association football	United Kingdom (England)
Desmond Armstrong	Ezra Armstrong, Dida Armstrong	Association football	United States
	Mai Asada, Mao Asada	Figure skating	Japan
Antonio Ascari	Alberto Ascari	Motorsport	Italy
Lisa Ashton	Danielle Ashton	Darts	United Kingdom (England)
	Dan Atherton, Gee Atherton, Rachel Atherton	Cycle sport, Downhill mountain biking	United Kingdom (England)
Pierre Aubameyang	Catilina Aubameyang, Willy Aubameyang, Pierre-Emerick Aubameyang	Association football	Gabon; France
Ronald Van Avermaet	Greg Van Avermaet	Road bicycle racing	Belgium
Albert Azaryan	Eduard Azaryan	Gymnastics	Soviet Union (Armenian SSR); Armenia
Abedi Pele	André Ayew, Jordan Ayew, Ibrahim Ayew	Association football	Ghana
	Tijani Babangida, Ibrahim Babangida, Haruna Babangida	Association football	Nigeria
Magnus Bäckstedt; Megan Hughes	Elynor Bäckstedt, Zoe Bäckstedt	Cycle sport	Sweden; United Kingdom (Wales)
	Johnsen Bacuna, Leandro Bacuna, Juninho Bacuna	Association football	Netherlands Antilles (Curaçao)
Gustavo Badell	Yamila Badell	Association football	Uruguay
Luca Badoer	Brando Badoer	Motorsport	Italy
Jean-Claude Bagot	Yoann Bagot	Cycle sport	France
Julian Bailey	Jack Clarke	Motorsport	United Kingdom (England)
David Bairstow	Jonny Bairstow	Cricket	United Kingdom (England)
	Mattia Bais, Davide Bais	Road bicycle racing	Italy
John Baldwin Sr.	John Baldwin, Don Baldwin, Donna Baldwin	Figure skating	United States
	Mosab Balhous, Anas Balhous	Association football	Syria
	Lonzo, LiAngelo, and LaMelo Ball	Basketball	United States
Bernard Balleret	Benjamin Balleret	Tennis	France
	Benjamin Balleret, Valentin Vacherot	Tennis	France; Monaco
Sergei Baltacha	Sergei Baltacha Jr., Elena Baltacha	Association football Tennis	Soviet Union (Ukrainian SSR); United Kingdom
Steve Bancroft	Dalton Bancroft	Ice hockey	Canada
Rubens Barrichello	Eduardo Barrichello, Fernando Barrichello	Motorsport	Brazil
Billy Bates	William Bates	Cricket/Association football	United Kingdom (England); United Kingdom (Wales)
William Bates	Ted Bates	Cricket/Association football	United Kingdom (Wales); United Kingdom (England)
	Guin Batten, Miriam Batten	Rowing	United Kingdom (England)
	Rudy Barbier, Pierre Barbier	Cycle sport	France
	Franco Baresi, Giuseppe Baresi	Association football	Italy
Giuseppe Baresi	Regina Baresi	Association football	Italy
	Hannah Barnes, Alice Barnes	Cycle sport	United Kingdom (England)
Sid Barras	Tom Barras	Cycle sport	United Kingdom (England)
	Mutaz Essa Barshim, Muamer Aissa Barsham, Meshaal Barsham	Track and field, Association football	Qatar
	Kane Barrett, Beauden Barrett, Scott Barrett, Jordie Barrett	Rugby union	New Zealand
Michael Barry, Dede Barry	Ashlin Barry	Cycle sport	Canada; United States
Rick Barry	Scooter, Jon, Brent and Drew Barry	Basketball	United States
	Sally Barsosio, Florence Barsosio	Track and field	Kenya
Karel Bártů	Jan Bártů	Modern pentathlon	Czechoslovakia
	Bates Battaglia, Anthony Battaglia	Ice hockey	United States
Giuliano Battocletti	Nadia Battocletti	Running	Italy
Alex Baumann	Ashton Baumann	Swimming	Canada
	Alain Baxter, Noel Baxter	Alpine skiing	Great Britain (Scotland)
	Ryan Bayley, Kristine Bayley	Track cycling	Australia
John Beattie	Johnnie Beattie, Jen Beattie	Rugby union, Association football	United Kingdom (Scotland)
	Bridget Becker, Scott Becker, Sean Becker	Curling	New Zealand
	Muriel Becker, Alisson Becker	Association football	Brazil
Benoni Beheyt (grandfather)	Kurt Van Keirsbulck (father)	Road bicycle racing	Belgium
Kurt Van Keirsbulck (father)	Guillaume Van Keirsbulck (grandson)	Road bicycle racing	Belgium
Derek Bell	Justin Bell	Motor sport	United Kingdom
	Martin Bell, Graham Bell	Alpine skiing	United Kingdom
	Tony Bell, Mark Bell	Cycle sport	United Kingdom (England)
Mark Bellingham	Jude Bellingham, Jobe Bellingham	Association football	United Kingdom (England)
Joseba Beloki	Markel Beloki	Road bicycle racing	Spain
	Chantal Beltman, Ghita Beltman	Road bicycle racing	Netherlands
	Lars Bender, Sven Bender	Association football	Germany
Winston Benjamin	Rai Benjamin	Cricket; Track and field	West Indies; United States
Nigel Benn	Conor Benn	Boxing	United Kingdom (England)
	Takumi Beppu, Fumiyuki Beppu	Road bicycle racing	Japan
	Aleksei Berezutski, Vasili Berezutski	Association football	Russia
Harald Berg	Ørjan Berg, Runar Berg, Arild Berg	Association football	Norway
Ørjan Berg	Patrick Berg	Association football	Norway
Arturo Bergamasco	Mauro Bergamasco, Mirco Bergamasco	Rugby union	Italy
	Lars Berger, Tora Berger	Biathlon, cross-country skiing	Norway
Gregg Berhalter	Sebastian Berhalter	Association football	United States
	Eyal Berkovic, Nir Berkovic	Association football	Israel
Jean-François Bernard	Julien Bernard	Road bicycle racing	France
Jean-René Bernaudeau	Giovanni Bernaudeau	Road bicycle racing	France
	Raimund Bethge, Bernhard Hochwald	Bobsleigh, shooting	East Germany; Germany
	Emmanuel Bett, Josphat Bett Kipkoech, David Kiprotich Bett	Running	Kenya
Jim Bett	Baldur Bett, Calum Bett	Association football	United Kingdom (Scotland); Iceland
	Nicholas Bett, Aron Koech (twins)	Track and field	Kenya
Tony Bettenhausen	Gary Bettenhausen, Merle Bettenhausen, Tony Bettenhausen Jr.	Auto racing	United States
Volodymyr Bezsonov Viktoria Serkyh	Anna Bessonova	Association football / Rhythmic gymnastics	Soviet Union (Ukrainian SSR); Ukraine
	Lucien Bianchi, Mauro Bianchi	Motorsport	Belgium
	Henry Bibby, Jim Bibby	Basketball / Baseball	United States
Henry Bibby	Mike Bibby	Basketball	United States
	Brad Binder, Darryn Binder	Motorcycle racing	South Africa
	Ben and Tom Birchall	Sidecar racing	United Kingdom (England)
Bjarni Guðjónsson	Jóhannes Bjarnason	Association football	Iceland
	Dag Bjørndalen, Ole Einar Bjørndalen	Biathlon, cross-country skiing	Norway
Jo Inge Bjørnebye	Stig Inge Bjørnebye	Ski jumping / Association football	Norway
	Sadie Bjornsen, Erik Bjornsen	Cross-country skiing	United States
Norman Black	Aaron Black (son), Chris Tan (stepson)	Basketball	United States; Philippines
Roger Black, Elsa Devassoigne	Isabelle Black	Sprint (running)	Great Britain (England); France
	Stina Blackstenius, Nina Koppang	Association football, Handball	Sweden
	Danny Blanchflower. Jackie Blanchflower	Association football	United Kingdom (Northern Ireland)
Lou Blaney (grandfather)	Dave Blaney (father), Dale Blaney (uncle)	Stock car racing / All Star Circuit of Champions	United States
Dave Blaney (father)	Ryan Blaney (grandson)	Stock car racing	United States
David Blatt	Tamir Blatt	Basketball	United States; Israel
Michael Bleekemolen	Sebastiaan Bleekemolen, Jeroen Bleekemolen	Motor sport	Netherlands
Danny Blind	Daley Blind	Association football	Netherlands
Stig Blomqvist	Tom Blomqvist	Rallying / Motor racing	Sweden; United Kingdom
Ken Block	Lia Block	Auto racing	United States
	Richard Blood Sr., Victor Blood	Professional wrestling	United States
Richard Blood Sr.	Richard Blood Jr.	Professional wrestling	United States
	Kevin-Prince Boateng, Jérôme Boateng	Association football	Ghana; Germany
	Tarjei Bø, Johannes Thingnes Bø	Biathlon	Norway
	Łukasz Bodnar, Maciej Bodnar	Road bicycle racing	Poland
	Frank de Boer, Ronald de Boer	Association football	Netherlands
	Melayro Bogarde, Lamare Bogarde	Association football	Netherlands
	Patrick Bogere, Cassandra Bogere	Boxing, association football	Sweden; Norway
	Håvard Bøkko, Hege Bøkko	Speed skating	Norway
	Valeria Bondarenko, Alona Bondarenko, Kateryna Bondarenko	Tennis	Ukraine
Bobby Bonds	Barry Bonds	Baseball	United States
Wilfried Bony	Geoffroy Bony	Association football	Ivory Coast; United Kingdom (Wales)
Marco Boogers	Quincy Boogers	Association football	Netherlands
Ray Boone	Bob Boone	Baseball	United States
Bob Boone	Bret Boone, Aaron Boone	Baseball	United States
Juan Carlos de Borbón, Sophia of Greece	Cristina de Borbón, Felipe de Borbón	Sailing	Spain; Greece
	Letizia Borghesi, Giada Borghesi	Cycle sport	Italy
Ferdinando Longo Borghini, Guidina Dal Sasso	Paolo Longo Borghini, Elisa Longo Borghini	Cross-country skiing Cycle sport	Italy
Elisa Longo Borghini, Jacopo Mosca		Cycle sport	Italy
Jacques Borlée	Dylan Borlée, Kevin Borlée, Jonathan Borlée, Olivia Borlée	Track and field	Belgium
	Jan Bos, Theo Bos	Speed skating and Road bicycle racing	Netherlands
	Jordan Bos, Kasey Bos	Association football	Australia
	Dajana Bošković, Tijana Bošković	Volleyball	Bosnia and Herzegovina; Serbia
Ian Botham	Liam Botham	Cricket, association football, rugby union, rugby league	United Kingdom (England)
Liam Botham	James Botham	Cricket, rugby union, rugby league	United Kingdom (England); United Kingdom (Wales)
Ron Bouchard	Chad Bouchard	Motor sport / Golf	United States
	Nacer Bouhanni, Rayane Bouhanni	Cycle sport	France)
Nourdin Boukhari (stepfather)	Noa Lang	Association football	Morocco; Netherlands
Patrick Bourdais	Sébastien Bourdais	Auto racing	France
	Mouhanad Boushi, Nihad Al Boushi	Association football	Syria
Jacky Boxberger	Ophélie Claude-Boxberger	Track and field	France
	Gillian Boxx, Shannon Boxx	Softball / Association football	United States
Ray Boyd; Denise Robert Boyd	Alana Boyd	Track and field	Australia
	Cloyd Boyer, Ken Boyer, Clete Boyer	Baseball	United States
Jack Brabham	Geoff Brabham, Gary Brabham, David Brabham	Motor racing	Australia
Geoff Brabham	Matthew Brabham	Motor racing	Australia; United States
David Brabham, Lisa Thackwell	Sam Brabham	Motor racing	Australia; New Zealand; United Kingdom
	Bob Bradley, Scott Bradley	Association football / Baseball	United States
Bob Bradley	Michael Bradley	Association football	United States
Abel Braga	Fábio Braga	Association football	Brazil; Portugal
Lisa Brambani	Abby-Mae Parkinson	Cycle sport	United Kingdom (England)
	Ernesto Brambilla, Vittorio Brambilla	Motorsport	Italy
	Gjermund Bråten, Øystein Bråten	Snowboarding / Freestyle skiing	Norway
Harald Brattbakk	Filip Brattbakk	Association football	Norway
Lee Brayton	Scott Brayton	Auto racing	United States
	Ben Bright, Rowena Bright, Torah Bright	Snowboarding / Alpine skiing	Australia
Robbie Brightwell; Ann Packer	Ian Brightwell, David Brightwell	Track and field / Association football	United Kingdom (England)
Chris Broad	Stuart Broad	Cricket	United Kingdom (England)
Ben Broeders, Femke Broeders-Bol		Track and field	Belgium; Netherlands
Stuart Brown	Jake Brown	Sidecarcross	United Kingdom (England)
	Alistair Brownlee, Jonny Brownlee	Triathlon	United Kingdom (England)
Mark Brownlee	Scott Brownlee	Rowing	New Zealand
Steve Bruce	Alex Bruce	Association football	United Kingdom (England); United Kingdom (Northern Ireland); Ireland
Martin Brundle	Alex Brundle	Auto racing	United Kingdom (England)
	Martin Brundle, Robin Brundle	Auto racing	United Kingdom (England)
	Bryan brothers	Tennis	United States
Joe Bryant	Kobe Bryant	Basketball	United States
Sergey Bubka	Sergei Bubka	Track and field / Tennis	Soviet Union (Ukrainian SSR); Ukraine
Jiří Bubla	Jiří Šlégr	Ice hockey	Czech Republic
	Nicholas Buckland, Joseph Buckland	Figure skating	United Kingdom (England)
Ion Bucșa	Cristina Bucșa	Biathlon / Tennis	Moldova; Spain
Gianluigi Buffon	Louis Buffon	Association football	Italy; Czech Republic
Andrei Bukin, Elena Vasiuk	Ivan Bukin	Ice dancing	Russia
Alex Bunbury	Teal Bunbury	Association football	Canada; United States
Vladimir Bure	Pavel Bure, Valeri Bure	Swimming; Ice hockey	Soviet Union (Russian SFSR); Russia; United States
	Peter Burge, Albert Burge, Frank Burge	Rugby union Rugby league	Australia
	Luke Burgess, Sam Burgess, Tom Burgess, George Burgess	Rugby league	United Kingdom (England)
	Ilya Burov, Maxim Burov	Freestyle skiing	Russia
	Leroy Burrell, Dawn Burrell	Track and field	United States
Leroy Burrell, Michelle Finn-Burrell	Cameron Burrell, Joshua Burrell	Track and field	United States
Jorge Burruchaga	Mauro Burruchaga, Román Andrés Burruchaga	Association football, Tennis	Argentina
Beryl Burton	Denise Burton	Cycle sport	Great Britain (England)
Jeff Burton	Harrison Burton	Stock car racing	United States
Maurice Burton	Germain Burton	Cycle sport	Great Britain (England)
Ward Burton	Jeb Burton	Stock car racing	United States
Jorge Burruchaga	Mauro Burruchaga, Román Burruchaga	Association football, Tennis	Argentina
	Kamil Bury, Dominik Bury	Cross-country skiing	Poland
Tom Busch	Kurt Busch, Kyle Busch	Stock car racing	United States
Carles Busquets	Sergio Busquets	Association football	Spain
	Vyacheslav Butsayev, Yuri Butsayev	Ice hockey	Russia
John Button	Jenson Button	Rallycross / Auto racing	United Kingdom (England)
Franky De Buyst (in Dutch)	Jasper De Buyst	Cycle sport	Belgium
	Benjamin Bwalya, Kalusha Bwalya, Joel Bwalya	Association football	Zambia
Sonny Cabatu	Junjun Cabatu	Basketball	Philippines
	Rodny Lopes Cabral, Sidny Lopes Cabral	Association football	Cape Verde
Danny Cadamarteri	Bailey Cadamarteri	Association football	United Kingdom (England); Jamaica
John H. Caldwell	Tim Caldwell, Sophie Caldwell	Cross-country skiing	United States
	Cate Campbell, Bronte Campbell	Swimming	Australia
Kevin Campbell	Tyrese Campbell	Association football	United Kingdom (England)
Malcolm Campbell	Donald Campbell	Motorsport	United Kingdom (England)
	Fabio Cannavaro, Paolo Cannavaro	Association football	Italy
	Isabella Cannuscio, Anastasia Cannuscio	Ice dancing	United States
	Eric Cantona, Joel Cantona	Association football	France
	Peter Carruthers, Kitty Carruthers	Figure skating	United States
	Mauro Caviezel, Gino Caviezel	Alpine skiing	Switzerland
Cha Bum-kun	Cha Du-ri	Association football	South Korea; Germany
Giorgio Cagnotto, Carmen Casteiner	Tania Cagnotto	Diving	Italy
Jamie Carragher	James Carragher	Association football	United Kingdom (England); Malta
	Delphine Cascarino, Estelle Cascarino	Association football	France
Daniela Ceccarelli	Lara Colturi	Alpine skiing	Italy; Albania
Johnny Cecotto	Johnny Cecotto Jr.	Auto racing	Venezuela
	Francisco Cerúndolo, Constanza Cerundolo, Juan Manuel Cerúndolo	Tennis; Field Hockey	Argentina
Ray Chadwick	Sydney Leroux	Baseball; Association football	United States; Canada
Brett Chalmers	Kyle Chalmers	Australian rules football Swimming	Australia
	Neville Chamberlain, Mark Chamberlain	Association football	United Kingdom (England)
Mark Chamberlain	Alex Oxlade-Chamberlain, Christian Oxlade-Chamberlain	Association football	United Kingdom (England)
	Richard Chambers, Peter Chambers	Rowing	United Kingdom (Northern Ireland)
Gurwinder Singh Chandi	Manjeet Kaur	Field hockey / Athletics	India
Vicky Chandhok	Karun Chandhok	Motorsport	India
	Ian Chappell, Greg Chappell, Trevor Chappell	Cricket	Australia
	John Charles, Mel Charles	Association football	United Kingdom (Wales)
	John Charles, Clive Charles	Association football	United Kingdom (England)
Mel Charles	Jeremy Charles	Association football	United Kingdom (Wales)
Ruperta Charles	Kaila Charles, Afia Charles	Athletics / Basketball / Athletics	Antigua and Barbuda / United States / Antigua and Barbuda
	Shea Charles, Pierce Charles	Association football	United Kingdom (Northern Ireland)
	Devynne Charlton, Anthaya Charlton	Sport of athletics	Bahamas
	Jack Charlton, Bobby Charlton	Association football	United Kingdom (England)
	Sylvain Chavanel, Sébastien Chavanel	Road bicycle racing	France
	Eddie Cheever, Ross Cheever	Auto sport	United States
Eddie Cheever	Eddie Cheever III	Auto sport	United States; Italy
	Robert Chemonges, Victor Kiplangat, Jacob Kiplimo, Oscar Chelimo	Long-distance running	Uganda
	Mercy Cherono, Caroline Chepkoech Kipkirui	Long-distance running	Kenya
Dmitri Cheryshev	Denis Cheryshev	Association football	CIS; Russia
Peter Chiarelli	Talia Chiarelli	Ice hockey / Gymnastics	Canada
Enrico Chiesa	Federico Chiesa	Association football	Italy
	Rolando Chilavert, José Luis Chilavert	Association football	Paraguay
	Tom Chilton, Max Chilton	Motorsport	United Kingdom
	Mark Christian, Anna Christian	Cycle sport	United Kingdom (Isle of Man)
	Daniele Cinciarini (in Italian), Andrea Cinciarini	Basketball	Italy
	Cesare Cipollini, Mario Cipollini	Road bicycle racing	Italy
	Paul Clarke, Steve Clarke	Association football	United Kingdom (Scotland)
	Florent Claude, Fabien Claude, Émilien Claude	Biathlon	France; Belgium
	Tia Clayton, Tina Clayton	Sprint (running)	Jamaica
	Libby Clegg, James Clegg, Stephen Clegg	Para-sport	United Kingdom (Scotland, England)
Ray Clemence	Stephen Clemence	Association football	United Kingdom (England)
Lei Clijsters	Kim Clijsters, Elke Clijsters	Association football / Tennis	Belgium
Stefano Cobolli	Flavio Cobolli	Tennis	Italy
	Cocada, Müller	Association football	Brazil
Skiing Cochrans		Alpine skiing	United States
Barbara Cochran	Ryan Cochran-Siegle	Alpine skiing	United States
Lindy Cochran	Tim Kelley, Robby Kelley	Alpine skiing	United States
	Jerry Codinera, Harmon Codinera & Pat Codinera	Basketball	Philippines
Richard Coffey	Amir Coffey, Nia Coffey	Basketball	United States
Andy Cole	Devante Cole	Association football	United Kingdom (England)
Joe P. Coleman	Joe H. Coleman	Baseball	United States
Joe H. Coleman	Casey Coleman	Baseball	United States
	Stefano Coletti, Alexandra Coletti	Auto racing / Alpine skiing	Monaco
Rob Collard	Ricky Collard, Jordan Collard	Auto racing	United Kingdom (England)
	Roddy Collins, Steve Collins	Association football, Boxing	Ireland
Enzo Coloni	Paolo Coloni	Motorsport	Italy
	Rubin Colwill, Joel Colwill	Association football	United Kingdom (Wales)
	Luís Pérez Companc, Pablo Pérez Companc	Auto racing	Argentina
Sérgio Marceneiro da Conceição	Sérgio Fernandes da Conceição, Rodrigo Conceição, Francisco Conceição	Association football	Portugal
	Simone Consonni, Chiara Consonni	Cycle sport	Italy
Charles Coody (grandfather)	Parker Coody, Pierceson Coody (twin grandsons)	Golf	United States
Kenny Cooper Sr.	Kenny Cooper Jr.	Association football	United Kingdom (England); United States
Francisco Copado	Lucas Copado	Association football	Germany
	Amber Cope, Angela Ruch	Stock car racing	United States
	Katherine Copely, Dean Copely	Ice dancing	United States
	Fausto Coppi, Serse Coppi	Cycle sport	Italy
	Tim Coronel, Tom Coronel	Motorsport	Netherlands
Gabriel Correa	Yannel Correa	Association football	Uruguay; Spain
	Thibaut Courtois, Valérie Courtois	Association football / Volleyball	Belgium
Lloyd Cowan	Dwayne Cowan	Track and field	United Kingdom (England)
	Tommy Coyle, Lewie Coyle, Rocco Coyle	Boxing, Association football	United Kingdom (England)
Colette Crabbé	Claire Michel	Swimming / Triathlon	Belgium
	Matthew Crampton, Jessica Crampton	Track cycling	Great Britain (England)
	Candace Crawford, Jack Crawford	Alpine skiing	Canada
	Chandra Crawford, Rosanna Crawford	Cross-country skiing / Biathlon	Canada
Johan Cruyff	Jordi Cruyff	Association football	Netherlands
László Cseh Sr.	László Cseh	Swimming	Hungary
Fabio Cudicini	Carlo Cudicini	Association football	Italy
	Marko Ćuk, Miloš Ćuk	Water polo	Serbia
Randall Cunningham	Randall Cunningham II, Vashti Cunningham	American football Track and field	United States
	Ben Curry, Tom Curry	Rugby union	Great Britain (England)
Dell Curry	Stephen Curry, Seth Curry	Basketball	United States
	Irene Curtoni, Elena Curtoni	Alpine skiing	Italy
	Michael Czyborra, Lennart Czyborra	Association football	Germany
Hans Daams	Jessie Daams	Road bicycle racing	Netherlands; Belgium
Derek Daly	Conor Daly	Auto racing	Ireland; United States
	Nina Daniels, Lisa Daniels	Synchronised swimming	New Zealand
Predrag Danilović	Olga Danilović	Basketball; Tennis	Serbia and Montenegro; Serbia
Pál Dárdai (grandfather)	Pál Dárdai (father)	Association football	Hungary
Pál Dárdai (father)	Palkó Dárdai, Márton Dárdai (grandson)	Association football	Hungary; Germany/Hungary
Nigel Davies	Sam Davies	Rugby union	United Kingdom (Wales)
	Billy Davies, John Davies	Association football	United Kingdom (Scotland)
	Alex Davison, Will Davison	Auto racing	Australia
	Julian de Guzman, Jonathan de Guzmán	Association football	Canada; Netherlands
	Mekseb Debesay, Mossana Debesai	Cycle sport	Eritrea
Brian Deegan	Hailie Deegan	Freestyle motocross Auto racing	United States
Iván DeJesús	Iván DeJesús Jr.	Baseball	Puerto Rico
Erik Dekker	David Dekker	Cycle sport	Netherlands
Jean-Denis Delétraz	Louis Delétraz	Motorsport	Switzerland
	Walter Delle Karth, Werner Delle Karth	Bobsleigh	Austria
Werner Delle Karth	Nico Delle Karth	Bobsleigh, Sailing	Austria
	Véronique Delobel, Isabelle Delobel	Ice dancing	France
Grégoire De Mévius	Guillaume De Mévius	Rallying	Belgium
Phil Dent, Betty Ann Grubb Stuart	Brett Hansen-Dent (step-son), Taylor Dent	Tennis	Australia; United States
	Laurens De Plus, Jasper De Plus	Cycle sport	Belgium
Nico Derwael, Marijke Lammens	Nina Derwael	Association football / Table tennis / Gymnastics	Belgium
Delino DeShields	Delino DeShields Jr. Diamond DeShields	Baseball; Basketball	United States
	Nate Diaz, Nick Diaz	Mixed martial arts	United States
Djalma Dias	Djalminha	Association football	Brazil
	Ejegayehu Dibaba, Tirunesh Dibaba, Genzebe Dibaba	Track and field	Ethiopia
	Peter Dibben, Jonathan Dibben	Cycle sport	Great Britain (England)
Michael DiBiase	Ted DiBiase	Professional wrestling	United States
Ted DiBiase	Ted DiBiase Jr., Mike DiBiase II, Brett DiBiase	Professional wrestling	United States
	Manuela Di Centa, Giorgio Di Centa	Cross-country skiing	Italy
Giorgio Di Centa	Martina Di Centa	Cross-country skiing	Italy
Lucien Didier	Laurent Didier	Road bicycle racing	Luxembourg
Jeremy Dier	Eric Dier	Tennis; Association football	Great Britain (England)
	Mick van Dijke, Tim van Dijke	Cycle sport	Netherlands
Adnan Dirjal	Muhannad Darjal	Association football	Iraq
Jean Djorkaeff	Youri Djorkaeff	Association football	France
	William Dod, Lottie Dod	Archery	United Kingdom (England)
	Reginald Doherty, Laurence Doherty	Tennis	United Kingdom
	José Dolhem, Didier Pironi	Auto racing	France
Tie Domi	Max Domi	Ice hockey	Canada
Mick Doohan	Jack Doohan	Motorcycle racing, Auto racing	Australia
Pat Doran	Liam Doran	Rallycross	United Kingdom (England)
Pierre-Antoine Dossevi	Thomas Dossevi, Mathieu Dossevi	Association football	Togo; France
	Guéla Doué, Désiré Doué	Association football	Ivory Coast; France
David Downey	Ray Downey	Boxing	Canada
Phil Dowsett	Alex Dowsett	Motorsport, cycle sport	United Kingdom
	Goran Dragić, Zoran Dragić	Basketball	Slovenia
	Dick Dreissigacker, Pete Dreissigacker	Rowing	United States
Dick Dreissigacker, Judy Geer	Hannah Dreissigacker, Emily Dreissigacker	Rowing, biathlon, cross-country skiing	United States
	Kelly Druyts, Gerry Druyts, Demmy Druyts, Jessy Druyts, Lenny Druyts	Cycle sport	Belgium
	Douglas Dryburgh, James Dryburgh	Curling	Great Britain (Scotland)
	Laros Duarte, Deroy Duarte	Association football	Cape Verde
	Daniel Dubois, Caroline Dubois	Boxing	Great Britain (England)
	Paul Duchesnay, Isabelle Duchesnay	Ice dancing	France; Canada
	Maxime Dufour-Lapointe, Chloé Dufour-Lapointe, Justine Dufour-Lapointe	Freestyle skiing moguls	Canada
	Denise Dupont, Madeleine Dupont, Oliver Dupont	Curling	Denmark
Dainis Dukurs	Tomass Dukurs, Martins Dukurs	Skeleton	Latvia
	Ryan Dunn, Justin Dunn	Basketball / Baseball	United States
Greg Duplantis, Helena Hedlund	Andreas Duplantis, Antoine Duplantis, Armand Duplantis, Johanna Duplantis	Pole vault / Track and field / Baseball	United States; Sweden
	Jason Dungjen, Susan Dungjen	Figure skating	United States
	Joey Dunlop, Robert Dunlop	Motorcycle Racing	United Kingdom (Northern Ireland)
Robert Dunlop	William Dunlop, Michael Dunlop	Motorcycle Racing	United Kingdom (Northern Ireland)
	Conor Dunne, Katy Dunne	Road bicycle racing / Tennis	Ireland; United Kingdom (England)
Peter Dürr	Katharina Dürr, Lena Dürr	Alpine skiing	Germany
Sean Dyche	Max Dyche	Association football	United Kingdom (England)
	Hollie Dykes, Lyndon Dykes	Artistic gymnastics, association football	Australia; United Kingdom (Scotland)
Ralph Earnhardt	Dale Earnhardt	Auto racing	United States
Dale Earnhardt	Dale Earnhardt Jr., Kerry Earnhardt	Auto racing	United States
Kerry Earnhardt	Jeffrey Earnhardt, Bobby Earnhardt	Auto racing	United States
Robert Earnshaw	Silva Mexes	Association football	United Kingdom (Wales); Thailand
	Guy East, Andrew East	Track cycling American football	United States
	Tobias Eberhard, Julian Eberhard	Biathlon	Austria
	Adam Eckersley, Richard Eckersley	Association football	United Kingdom (England)
	Stian Eckhoff, Tiril Eckhoff	Biathlon	Norway
Alfred Eder	Simon Eder	Biathlon	Austria
	Sylvia Eder, Elfi Eder	Alpine skiing	Austria
	Annette Edmondson, Alex Edmondson	Cycle sport	Australia
Vilhjálmur Einarsson	Einar Vilhjálmsson	Track and field	Iceland
	Attila Elek, György Elek	Ice dancing	Hungary
	Mark Ella, Glen Ella, Gary Ella, Marcia Ella-Duncan	Rugby union, Netball	Australia
Bill Elliott	Chase Elliott	Stock car racing	United States
	Dean Ellison, James Ellison	Motorcycle racing	United Kingdom (England)
	Malek El Mala, Said El Mala	Association football	Germany
Yehia Emam and Hamada Emam	Hazem Emam	Association football	Egypt
Yves Ehrlacher, Cathy Muller	Yann Ehrlacher	Association football, motorsport	France
	Juvenal Edjogo-Owono, Alberto Edjogo-Owono	Association football	Equatorial Guinea; Spain
Younes El Aynaoui	Neil El Aynaoui	Tennis; Association football	Morocco
	Fedor Emelianenko, Alexander Emelianenko	Mixed martial arts	Russia
	Vicente Engonga, Óscar Engonga	Association football	Spain
Óscar Engonga	Igor Engonga	Association football	Spain; Equatorial Guinea
	Juan Epitié, Rubén Epitié	Association football	Equatorial Guinea; Spain
	Christian Eriksen, Louise Eriksen	Association football	Denmark
Philippe Ermenault	Corentin Ermenault	Cycle sport	France
	Martina Ertl, Andreas Ertl	Alpine skiing	Germany
Sergio Escudero	Sergio Escudero	Association football	Argentina; Japan; Spain
	Aleix Espargaró, Pol Espargaró	Motorcycle racing Cycle sport	Spain
Daniel Esposito	Chloe Esposito, Max Esposito	Modern pentathlon	Australia
Henri Estanguet	Patrice Estanguet, Tony Estanguet	Canoe slalom	France
	Jonny Evans, Corry Evans	Association football	United Kingdom (Northern Ireland)
	Fred Evans, Aja Evans	American football / Bobsleigh	United States
Gwyndaf Evans	Elfyn Evans	Rallying	United Kingdom (Wales)
Ros Evans	Neah Evans	Fell running, orienteering, cross-country skiing, cycle sport	Great Britain (Scotland)
	Simon Evans, Mitch Evans	Motor racing	New Zealand
Patrick Evenepoel	Remco Evenepoel	Cycle sport	Belgium
Patrick Ewing	Patrick Ewing Jr.	Basketball	Jamaica; United States
Chris Eubank	Chris Eubank Jr.	Boxing	United Kingdom (England)
Cecil Exum	Dante Exum	Basketball	United States; Australia
Wim Eyckmans	Ean Eyckmans	Motorsport	Belgium
Oddmar Færø (grandfather)	Odmar Færø (father)	Association football	Faeroe Islands
Odmar Færø (father)	Odmar Færø (grandson)	Association football	Faeroe Islands
	Teo Fabi, Corrado Fabi	Motorsport	Italy
	Wagnney Fabiano, Leonardo Santos	Mixed martial arts	Brazil
Steve Fairbairn	Ian Fairbairn	Rowing	Australia; United Kingdom (England)
	Miguel Ángel Falasca, Guillermo Falasca	Volleyball	Spain; Argentina
	Esquiva Falcão, Yamaguchi Falcão	Boxing	Brazil
Kuli Faletau	Taulupe Faletau	Rugby union	Tonga; United Kingdom (Wales)
	Elena Fanchini, Nadia Fanchini, Sabrina Fanchini	Alpine skiing	Italy
Fandi Ahmad	Irfan Fandi, Ikhsan Fandi, Ilhan Fandi	Association football	Singapore
	Romy Farah, Robert Farah	Tennis	Colombia
Andy Farrell	Owen Farrell	Rugby union, Rugby league	United Kingdom (England)
	Duarte Félix da Costa, António Félix da Costa	Auto racing	Portugal
	Kurt Felix, Lindon Victor	Combined track and field events	Grenada
	Wes Felix, Allyson Felix	Sprinting	United States
	Josef Fendt, Andrea Fendt	Luge	Germany
	Rio Ferdinand, Anton Ferdinand	Association football	United Kingdom (England)
	Bia Feres, Branca Feres	Synchronized swimming	Brazil
Alex Ferguson	Darren Ferguson	Association football	United Kingdom (Scotland)
	Derek Ferguson, Barry Ferguson	Association football	United Kingdom (Scotland)
Barry Ferguson	Kyle Ferguson	Association football	United Kingdom (Scotland)
Derek Ferguson	Lewis Ferguson	Association football	United Kingdom (Scotland)
	Francisco Fernández Ochoa, Blanca Fernández Ochoa	Alpine skiing	Spain)
Jorge Fernandez	Leylah Fernandez	Association football Tennis	Ecuador; Canada
Sepp Ferstl	Josef Ferstl	Alpine skiing	Germany
	Alain Ferté, Michel Ferté	Motorsport	France
Olivia Féry, Loïc Féry	Arthur Fery	Tennis, Association football	France; Hong Kong; Great Britain (England)
Vasily Georgiyevich Fesikov	Sergey Fesikov	Volleyball; Swimming	Russia
Monika Feuersinger (in German)	Therese Feuersinger (in German)	Triathlon	Austria
	Paulína Fialková, Ivona Fialková	Biathlon	Slovakia
Giovanni Fidanza	Arianna Fidanza, Martina Fidanza	Cycle sport	Italy
Tonga Fifita	Tevita Fifita, Alipate Leone	Professional wrestling	Tonga; United States
	Jaime Fillol, Álvaro Fillol	Tennis	Chile
Jaime Fillol	Jaime Fillol Jr.	Tennis	Chile
Jaime Fillol (grandfather)	Nicolás Jarry (grandson)	Tennis	Chile
	Ralph Firman, Natasha Firman	Motorsport	Ireland; United Kingdom (England)
	Hans Peter Fischnaller, Dominik Fischnaller	Luge	Italy
Alastair Fisher	Colin Fisher	Rugby union	United Kingdom (Scotland)
	Niamh Fisher-Black, Finn Fisher-Black	Cycle sport	New Zealand
Kenni Fisilau	Greg Fisilau	Rugby union	Tonga; United Kingdom (England)
	Wilson Fittipaldi Júnior, Emerson Fittipaldi	Auto racing	Brazil
Wilson Fittipaldi Júnior	Christian Fittipaldi	Auto racing	Brazil
	Pietro Fittipaldi, Enzo Fittipaldi	Auto racing	Brazil
	Matt Fitzpatrick, Alex Fitzpatrick	Golf	Great Britain (England)
Jim Fleeting	Julie Fleeting	Association football	United Kingdom (Scotland)
	Bryan Fletcher, Taylor Fletcher	Nordic combined	United States
Darren Fletcher	Jack Fletcher, Tyler Fletcher	Association football	United Kingdom (Scotland); United Kingdom (England)
Richard Fliehr	David Fliehr, Ashley Fliehr, Reid Fliehr	Professional wrestling	United States
Andrew Flintoff	Rocky Flintoff	Cricket	United Kingdom (England)
	Garry Flitcroft, David Flitcroft	Association football	United Kingdom (England)
	Jostein Flo, Jarle Flo, Tore André Flo	Association football	Norway
	Lukas Flückiger, Mathias Flückiger	Mountain bike racing	Switzerland
	Alejandro Foglia, Andrea Foglia	Sailing	Uruguay
John Force	Ashley Force Hood, Brittany Force, Courtney Force	Drag racing	United States
Mike Ford	Joe Ford, George Ford	Rugby league, Rugby union	Great Britain (England)
George Foreman	George Foreman III	Boxing	United States
Pablo Forlán	Diego Forlán	Association football	Uruguay
	James Forrest, Alan Forrest	Association football	United Kingdom (Scotland)
Nick Foster	Louis Foster	Motorsport	United Kingdom (England)
	Simon Fourcade, Martin Fourcade	Biathlon, cross-country skiing	France
Grant Fox	Ryan Fox	Rugby union, Golf	New Zealand
	Richard Fox, Rachel Crosbee	Canoe slalom	United Kingdom (England)
Richard Fox, Myriam Fox-Jerusalmi	Jessica Fox, Noemie Fox	Canoe slalom	United Kingdom (England); France; Australia
Bill France Sr.	Bill France Jr., Jim France	Auto racing	United States
Bill France Jr.	Brian France, Lesa France Kennedy	Auto racing	United States
	Dario Franchitti, Marino Franchitti	Auto racing	United Kingdom (Scotland)
Patrick Frary	Roy Bevis	Professional wrestling	United Kingdom (England)
Patrick Frary; Julia Hamer	Saraya Bevis, Zak Frary	Professional wrestling	United Kingdom (England)
Don Fraser, Candace Jones	Mat Fraser	Figure skating CrossFit	Canada; United States
Joe Frazier	Jackie Frazier-Lyde	Boxing	United States
	Uwe Freimuth, Jörg Freimuth	Track and field	East Germany
Uwe Freimuth	Rico Freimuth	Track and field	East Germany; Germany
Mario Frick	Yanik Frick	Association football	Liechtenstein
Peter Frischknecht (in French) (grandfather)	Thomas Frischknecht (in French) (father)	Cycle sport	Switzerland
Thomas Frischknecht (in French) (father)	Andri Frischknecht (in French) (grandson)	Mountain bike racing	Switzerland
Guy Fritz; Kathy May	Taylor Fritz	Tennis	United States
Christof Frommelt	Willi Frommelt, Paul Frommelt	Cross-country skiing Alpine skiing	Liechtenstein
	Lado Fumic (in German), Manuel Fumic	Mountain bike racing	Germany
Paul Furlong	Darnell Furlong	Association football	United Kingdom (England)
	Graham Futcher, Paul Futcher, Ron Futcher	Association football	United Kingdom (England)
Paul Futcher	Ben Futcher	Association football	United Kingdom (England)
Gabre Gabric	Eddy Ottoz	Track and field	Croatia; Italy
Tonči Gabrić	Drago Gabrić, Paškvalina Gabrić	Association football	Croatia
Marcelo Gallardo	Nahuel Gallardo	Association football	Argentina
Vittorio Gallinari	Danilo Gallinari	Basketball	Italy
	Alain Gallopin (in French), Joel Gallopin, Guy Gallopin	Cycle sport	France
Joel Gallopin	Tony Gallopin	Cycle sport	France
Bebeto (José Roberto Gama de Oliveira)	Mattheus	Association football	Brazil
Marco Ganna	Filippo Ganna	Canoe sprint Cycle sport	Italy
Ricardo Gardner	Che Gardner	Association football	Jamaica
Wayne Gardner	Remy Gardner	Motorcycle racing	Australia
	Lucy Garner, Grace Garner	Road bicycle racing	United Kingdom (England)
	Agnieszka Gąsienica-Daniel, Maryna Gąsienica-Daniel	Alpine skiing	Poland
	Andrzej Gąsienica Daniel, Helena Gąsienica Daniel, Maria Gąsienica Daniel-Szatkowska, Józef Gąsienica Daniel	Cross-country skiing, alpine skiing, ski jumping, Nordic combined	Poland
	Pau Gasol, Marc Gasol	Basketball	Spain
	Selina Gasparin, Elisa Gasparin, Aita Gasparin	Biathlon	Switzerland
	Sebastiano Gastaldi, Nicol Gastaldi	Alpine skiing	Argentina
Sunil Gavaskar	Rohan Gavaskar	Cricket	India
	Elene Gedevanishvili, Dimitri Gedevanishvili	Figure skating Alpine skiing	Georgia
	Judy Geer, Charlotte Geer	Rowing	United States
Archie Gemmill	Scot Gemmill	Association football	United Kingdom (Scotland)
	Jordi Gené, Marc Gené	Auto racing	Spain
	Riccardo De Gennaro, Giovanni De Gennaro	Canoe slalom	Italy
Ferdinando Gentile	Alessandro Gentile, Stefano Gentile	Basketball	Italy
	Francisco Gento, Julio Gento, Antonio Gento	Association football	Spain
Aladár Gerevich	Pál Gerevich	Fencing	Hungary
Jürgen Geschke	Simon Geschke	Cycle sport	East Germany; Germany
	Abdelkader Ghezzal, Rachid Ghezzal	Association football	Algeria
	Philippe Gilbert, Jérôme Gilbert	Cycle sport	Belgium
Maurice Gillen	Lucien Gillen	Cycle sport	Luxembourg
	Todd Gilles, Piper Gilles, Alexe Gilles	Ice dancing	United States
David Gillow	Shara Gillow	Cycle sport	Zimbabwe; Australia
Graeme Gilmore	Matthew Gilmore	Cycle sport	Australia; Belgium
	Néstor Girolami, Franco Girolami	Motorsport	Argentina
	Dominique Gisin, Marc Gisin, Michelle Gisin	Alpine skiing	Switzerland
	Ilja Glebov, Jelena Glebova	Figure skating	Estonia
Gerhard Gleirscher	David Gleirscher, Nico Gleirscher	Luge	Austria
	Mario Götze, Fabian Götze, Felix Götze	Association football	Germany
	Francesc Godoy, Anna Godoy	Triathlon	Spain
	Christine Goitschel, Marielle Goitschel	Alpine skiing	France
	Carly Gold, Gracie Gold	Figure skating	United States
	Taylor Gold, Arielle Gold	Snowboarding Half-pipe	United States
Gil Gomes	Angel Gomes	Association football	Portugal; United Kingdom (England)
Andrés Gómez	Emilio Gómez	Tennis	Ecuador
	Héctor González (El Turbo), Raúl González Guzmán (El Pollo)	Association football	Venezuela
Pullela Gopichand	PVV Lakshmi	Badminton	India
Tom "Flash" Gordon	Dee Gordon	Baseball	United States
Dean Gorré	Kenji Gorré	Association football	Suriname; Netherlands (Curaçao)
Alexei Gorshkov	Anastasia Gorshkova	Ice dancing	Russia
Charlie Gough	Richard Gough	Association football	United Kingdom (Scotland)
Bobby Gould	Jonathan Gould, Richard Gould	Association football, Cricket	United Kingdom (England); United Kingdom (Scotland)
Jonathan Gould	Matthew Gould	Association football	United Kingdom (Scotland); United Kingdom (England)
Jean-Marc Gounon	Jules Gounon	Motor racing	France
Christian Gourcuff	Yoann Gourcuff	Association football	France
Grace family		Cricket	United Kingdom (England)
Gracie family	Scores of family members, spanning four generations in competitive martial arts	Brazilian jiu-jitsu / Mixed martial arts	Brazil; United States
	Torben Grael, Lars Grael	Sailing	Brazil
Torben Grael	Marco Grael, Martine Grael	Sailing	Brazil
	François-Cyrille Grange, Jean-Baptiste Grange	Alpine skiing	France
	Marcel Granollers, Gerard Granollers	Tennis	Spain
	Horace Grant, Harvey Grant	Basketball	United States
	Logan Gray, Lauren Gray	Curling	Great Britain (Scotland)
	Sophia of Greece, Constantine of Greece	Sailing	Greece
Dick Greenwood	Will Greenwood	Rugby union	United Kingdom (England)
Ken Griffey Sr.	Ken Griffey Jr.	Baseball	United States
Reinier Groenendaal	Richard Groenendaal	Cyclo-cross	Netherlands
Marcus Grönholm	Niclas Grönholm	Rallying	Finland
	Mike Groff, Robbie Groff	Auto racing	United States
	Jannie de Groot, Daan de Groot	Swimming / Cycle sport	Netherlands
	Christine von Grünigen, Michael von Grünigen	Alpine skiing	Switzerland
Michael von Grünigen	Noel von Grünigen	Alpine skiing	Switzerland
Nebojša Gudelj	Nemanja Gudelj, Dragiša Gudelj	Association football	Serbia; Netherlands
Domingos da Guia	Ademir da Guia	Association football	Brazil
	Antonin Guigonnat, Gilonne Guigonnat	Biathlon	France
Matt Guokas Sr.	Matt Guokas	Basketball	United States
Guðjón Þórðarson	Þórður Guðjónsson, Bjarni Guðjónsson, Joey Guðjónsson	Association football	Iceland
Arnór Guðjohnsen	Eiður Guðjohnsen, Arnór Borg Guðjohnsen	Association football	Iceland
Eiður Guðjohnsen	Sveinn Aron Guðjohnsen, Andri Guðjohnsen, Daníel Guðjohnsen	Association football	Iceland
Guerrero family		Professional wrestling	Mexico; United States
Ruud Gullit	Maxim Gullit	Association football	Netherlands
Lourdes Gourriel	Yuli Gurriel, Lourdes Gurriel Jr.	Baseball	Cuba
	Sondre Guttormsen, Simen Guttormsen	Pole vault	Norway
Alf-Inge Haaland	Erling Haaland	Association football	Norway
Rudy Hackett	Daniel Hackett	Basketball	Italy; United States
	Mustapha Hadji, Youssouf Hadji	Association football	Morocco
Mustapha Hadji	Samir Hadji, Zachary Hadji	Association football	Morocco; France
Walter Hadlee	Barry Hadlee, Dayle Hadlee, Richard Hadlee	Cricket	New Zealand
Richard Hadlee, Karen Marsh		Cricket	New Zealand
	Juan José Haedo, Lucas Sebastián Haedo	Road bicycle racing	Argentina
	Andreas Hagara, Roman Hagara	Sailing	Austria
	Bella van der Spiegel-Hage, Keetie van Oosten-Hage, Heleen Hage	Road bicycle racing	Netherlands
Gheorge Hagi	Ianis Hagi	Association football	Romania
Sam Hairston	Jerry Hairston Sr., Johnny Hairston	Baseball	United States
Jerry Hairston Sr.	Jerry Hairston Jr., Scott Hairston	Baseball	United States
Charles Haley	Madison Haley	American football, Association football	United States
Sejad Halilović	Alen Halilović	Association football	Bosnia and Herzegovina; Croatia
	Charles Hamelin, François Hamelin	Short track speed skating	Canada
	Lewis Hamilton, Nicolas Hamilton	Auto racing	United Kingdom (England)
	Matt Hamilton, Becca Hamilton	Curling	United States
	Quinn Hughes, Jack Hughes, Luke Hughes	Ice hockey	United States
	Katsuji Hanada, Mitsuru Hanada	Sumo	Japan
Mitsuru Hanada	Masaru Hanada, Kōji Hanada	Sumo	Japan
	Michael Hannah, Tracey Hannah	Downhill mountain biking	Australia
	John Hansen, Alan Hansen	Association football	United Kingdom (Scotland)
Kenneth Hansen Susann Hansen (née Bergvall)	Timmy Hansen, Kevin Hansen	Rallycross	Sweden
	Lasse Norman Hansen, Louise Hansen	Cycle sport	Denmark
	Louise Hansson, Sophie Hansson	Swimming	Sweden
Tim Hardaway	Tim Hardaway Jr.	Basketball	United States
	Janette Hargin, Mattias Hargin	Alpine skiing	Sweden
	Shaquille Harrison, Monte Harrison	Basketball / Baseball	United States
Hart family		Professional wrestling	Canada; United States; United Kingdom (England)
	Robert Harting, Christoph Harting	Track and field	Germany
	Azat Harutyunyan, Vladimir Harutyunyan (twins) (in Italian)	Diving	Armenia
	Yulduz Hashimi, Fariba Hashimi	Road bicycle racing	Afghanistan
Ron Haslam	Leon Haslam	Motorcycle racing	United Kingdom (England)
Don Hasselbeck	Matt Hasselbeck, Tim Hasselbeck	American football	United States
	Gavin Hastings, Scott Hastings	Rugby union	United Kingdom (Scotland)
Gavin Hastings	Adam Hastings	Rugby union	United Kingdom (Scotland)
Tony Hateley	Mark Hateley	Association football	United Kingdom (England)
Mark Hateley	Tom Hateley	Association football	United Kingdom (England)
Dido Havenaar	Mike Havenaar, Nikki Havenaar	Association football	Netherlands; Japan
	Derek Hawkins, Callum Hawkins	Distance Running	United Kingdom (Scotland)
Chuck Hay	David Hay, Mike Hay	Curling	Great Britain (Scotland)
	Eden Hazard, Thorgan Hazard, Kylian Hazard	Association football	Belgium
	David Hearn, Cathy Hearn	Canoe slalom	United States
Traudl Hecher	Stephan Görgl, Elisabeth Görgl	Alpine skiing	Austria
	Eric Heiden, Beth Heiden	Speed skating, cycle sport, cross-country skiing	United States
Beth Heiden	Joanne Reid	Speed skating, cycle sport, cross-country skiing / Biathlon	United States
	Nick Heidfeld, Sven Heidfeld	Auto racing	Germany
Wolfgang Heinig Katrin Dörre-Heinig (in German)	Katharina Heinig (in German)	Running	East Germany
	Carol Heiss, Nancy Heiss	Figure skating	United States
	Michaela Hejnová, Zuzana Hejnová	Track and field	Czech Republic
Darren Henderson	Jay Henderson	Association football	United Kingdom (Scotland)
Nicky Henderson	Liam Henderson, Ewan Henderson	Association football	United Kingdom (Scotland)
Hendrick family		Auto racing	United States
	Jorik Hendrickx, Loena Hendrickx	Figure skating	Belgium
Larry Hennig	Curt Hennig	Professional wrestling	United States
Curt Hennig	Joe Hennig	Professional wrestling	United States
Javier Hernández Gutiérrez	Javier Hernández	Association football	Mexico
Jean-François Hernandez	Lucas Hernandez, Théo Hernandez	Association football	France
Margarita Geuer	Willy Hernangómez, Juan Hernangómez	Basketball	Spain
	José Herrada, Jesús Herrada	Cycle sport	Spain
Pedro María Herrera	Ander Herrera	Association football	Spain
Bryan Herta	Colton Herta	Auto racing	United States
Emile Heskey	Reigan Heskey, Jaden Heskey	Association football	United Kingdom (England)
	Louis Heusghem, Hector Heusghem	Road bicycle racing	Belgium
	Glynn Hewitt, Darryl Hewitt	Australian rules football	Australia
Glynn Hewitt	Lleyton Hewitt, Jaslyn Hewitt	Australian rules football, Tennis	Australia
Lleyton Hewitt	Cruz Hewitt	Tennis	Australia
George Heyes	Darren Heyes	Association football	United Kingdom (England)
Darren Heyes	Joe Heyes	Association football, Rugby union	United Kingdom (England)
	William Hickox, Laurie Hickox	Figure skating	United States
Luboš Hilgert (father), Štěpánka Hilgertová	Luboš Hilgert (son) Amálie Hilgertová (niece)	Canoe slalom	Czech Republic
Calvin Hill	Grant Hill	American football / Basketball	United States
Graham Hill (grandfather)	Damon Hill (father)	Auto racing	United Kingdom (England)
Damon Hill (father)	Josh Hill (grandson)	Auto racing	United Kingdom (England)
Osamu Higashio	Riko Higashio	Baseball / Golf	Japan
Jorge Higuaín	Gonzalo Higuaín, Federico Higuaín	Association football	Argentina; France
	Sergio Hinestrosa, Ruslán Hinestrosa (cousin)	Association football / Basketball	Equatorial Guinea
	Noah Hobbs, Henry Hobbs	Cycle sport	Great Britain (England)
	Glenn Hoddle, Carl Hoddle	Association football	United Kingdom (England)
	Maria Höfl-Riesch, Susanne Riesch	Alpine skiing	Germany
	Daniel Hoelgaard, Markus Hoelgaard	Cycle sport	Norway
Willie Hogg	Kyle Hogg	Cricket	United Kingdom (England)
	Nicolai Højgaard, Rasmus Højgaard	Golf	Denmark
	Karen Holmgaard, Sara Holmgaard	Association football	Denmark
	Gunnar Holmgren, Ava Holmgren, Isabella Holmgren	Cycle sport	Canada
Erica Hooker, Bill Hooker	Steve Hooker	Track and field	Australia
Gino Van Hooydonck (in Dutch), Edwig Van Hooydonck (uncle)	Nathan Van Hooydonck	Road bicycle racing	Belgium
Tito Horford	Al Horford, Jon Horford	Basketball	Dominican Republic; United States
	Stefanie Horn, Jacqueline Horn	Canoe slalom	Italy; Germany
Jill Horstead	Brooke McIntosh, Summer McIntosh	Swimming, Figure skating	Canada; Spain
Kazuyoshi Hoshino	Kazuki Hoshino	Motorsport	Japan
	Adri van Houwelingen, Jan van Houwelingen	Road bicycle racing	Netherlands
Gordie Howe	Mark Howe, Marty Howe	Ice hockey	Canada; United States
Wendy Hoyte	Justin Hoyte, Gavin Hoyte	Track and field / Association football	United Kingdom (England)
	Keiffer Hubbell, Madison Hubbell	Ice dancing	United States
	Norbert Huber, Günther Huber, Arnold Huber, Wilfried Huber	Bobsleigh, Luge	Italy
	Chris Hughton, Henry Hughton	Association football	Ireland
Chris Hughton	Cian Hughton	Association football	Ireland
	Patrick Huisman, Duncan Huisman	Auto racing	Netherlands
Stefan Hula Sr.	Stefan Hula Jr.	Ski jumping	Poland
Bobby Hull	Brett Hull	Ice hockey	Canada; United States
Randy Hundley	Todd Hundley	Baseball	USA
	James Hunt, David Hunt	Auto racing	United Kingdom (England)
James Hunt	Freddie Hunt	Motorsport	United Kingdom (England)
	Noel Hunt, Stephen Hunt	Association football	Ireland
Marc Hunter	Drew Hunter	Long-distance running, middle-distance running	United States
Patrick Hürlimann, Janet Hürlimann	Briar Hürlimann	Curling	Switzerland
	Daniele Hypólito, Diego Hypólito	Gymnastics	Brazil
Hur Jae	Heo Ung, Heo Hoon	Basketball	South Korea
	Claudio Husaín, Darío Husaín	Association football	Argentina
	Park Hyun-sun, Park Hyun-ha	Synchronised swimming	South Korea
Gianni Iapichino, Fiona May	Larissa Iapichino	Sport of athletics	Italy; Great Britain (England)
	Chiharu Icho, Kaori Icho	Wrestling	Japan
	Pascal Ickx, Jacky Ickx	Auto racing	Belgium
Jacky Ickx	Vanina Ickx	Auto racing	Belgium
	Luka Ilić, Ivan Ilić	Association football	Serbia
Danny Ildefonso	Sean Ildefonso, Dave Ildefonso, Sofia Ildefonso	Basketball / Volleyball	Philippines
Paul Ince	Tom Ince	Association football	United Kingdom (England)
	Miguel Induráin, Prudencio Induráin	Road bicycle racing	Spain
Gjert Ingebrigtsen (in Norwegian)	Kristoffer Ingebrigtsen, Martin Ingebrigtsen Henrik Ingebrigtsen, Filip Ingebrigtsen, Jakob Ingebrigtsen, Ingrid Ingebrigtsen	Middle-distance running	Norway
	Filippo Inzaghi, Simone Inzaghi	Association football	Italy
Ted Irvine	Christopher Irvine	Ice hockey / Professional wrestling	Canada; United States
Sadao Iwahira (grandfather)	Wataru Onami, Minato Otami, Atsushi Onami	Sumo	Japan
	Gorka Izagirre, Ion Izagirre	Road bicycle racing	Spain
William Jackson	Laurence Jackson	Curling	United Kingdom (Scotland)
Liv Jagge-Christiansen	Finn Christian Jagge	Alpine skiing	Norway
	Laurent Jalabert, Nicolas Jalabert	Road bicycle racing	France
LeBron James	Bronny James	Basketball	United States
	Rachel James, Becky James	Cycle sport	United Kingdom (Wales)
	Reece James, Lauren James	Association football	United Kingdom (England)
	Jan Janků, Tomáš Janků	Track and field	Czech Republic
Boban Janković	Vladimir Janković	Basketball	Serbia; Greece
	Britt Janyk, Michael Janyk	Alpine skiing	Canada
Ned Jarrett	Glenn Jarrett, Dale Jarrett	Auto racing	United States
Glenn Jarrett	Jason Jarrett	Auto racing	United States
	Isgandar Javadov, Fizuli Javadov	Association football	Azerbaijan
Fizuli Javadov	Vagif Javadov,	Association football	Azerbaijan
Robert Jaworski	Robert Jaworski Jr.	Basketball	Philippines
Charles Jenkins Sr.	Charles "Chip" Jenkins	Track and field	United States
	Hayes Alan Jenkins, David Jenkins	Figure skating	United States
Pat Jennings	Pat Jennings Jr.	Association football	United Kingdom (Northern Ireland); United Kingdom (England)
	Erik Jensen, John Jensen	Association football	Denmark
Roland Jentsch, Christiane Jentsch	Daniela Jentsch, Analena Jentsch	Curling	Germany
	Aatef Jenyat, Amro Jenyat	Association football	Syria
	Pooh Jeter, Carmelita Jeter	Basketball; Track and field	United States
Joey Guðjónsson	Ísak Jóhannesson, Daniel Jóhannesson	Association football	Iceland
Leif Johansson	Joachim Johansson	Tennis	Sweden
Brandy Johnson	Sydney Johnson-Scharpf	Gymnastics	United States
David Johnson	Brennan Johnson	Association football	Jamaica; United Kingdom (England); United Kingdom (Wales)
Rocky Johnson	Dwayne Johnson	Professional wrestling	United States; Canada
Dwayne Johnson	Simone Johnson	Professional wrestling	United States
	Sammy Johnston, Allan Johnston	Association football	United Kingdom (Scotland)
Allan Johnston	Max Johnston	Association football	United Kingdom (Scotland)
	Craig Joiner, Charline Joiner	Rugby union, cycle sport	Great Britain (Scotland)
	Natasha Jonas, Nikita Parris	Boxing, association football	Great Britain (England)
Stan Jones	Alan Jones	Auto racing	Australia
Alan Jones	Christian Jones	Auto racing	Australia
	Alan Jones, Eifion Jones	Cricket	United Kingdom (Wales)
	Caldwell Jones, Charles Jones, Major Jones, Will Jones	Basketball	United States
	Jon Jones, Arthur Jones, Chandler Jones	Mixed martial arts / American football	United States
Louise Jones	Hayley Jones	Cycle sport	United Kingdom (Wales)
Popeye Jones	Seth Jones, Caleb Jones	Basketball / Ice hockey	United States
Jerry de Jong	Nigel de Jong	Association football	Netherlands
Joe Jordan	Andy Jordan, Tom Jordan	Association football	United Kingdom (Scotland)
Michael Jordan	Jeffrey Jordan, Marcus Jordan	Basketball	United States
Mike Jordan	Andrew Jordan	Auto racing	United Kingdom (England)
	Jonathan Joseph, Will Joseph	Rugby union	United Kingdom (England)
	Ronald Joseph, Vivian Joseph	Figure skating	United States
	Sarah Josephson, Karen Josephson	Synchronized swimming	United States
	Diogo Jota, André Silva	Association football	Portugal
	Al Joyner, Jackie Joyner-Kersee	Track and field	United States
Luis Juncos, Valentina Aracil	Natalie Juncos	Swimming; Association football	Argentina; United States
Marat Kabayev	Alina Kabaeva	Association football / Rhythmic gymnastics	Russia
	Kaká, Digão	Association football	Brazil
Anders Kallur	Susanna Kallur, Jenny Kallur	Ice hockey Track and field	Sweden
Tadashige Kamakari	Yukio Naya, Kōnosuke Naya	Sumo; Professional wrestling	Japan
	Mujinga Kambundji, Ditaji Kambundji	Sprint (running)	Switzerland
	André Kana-Biyik, François Omam-Biyik	Association football	Cameroon
André Kana-Biyik	Jean-Armel Kana-Biyik, Enzo Kana-Biyik	Association football	Cameroon
	Nwankwo Kanu, Christopher Kanu, Henry Isaac	Association football	Nigeria
	Andy Kapp, Uli Kapp	Curling	Germany
Andy Kapp	Benjamin Kapp	Curling	Germany
Vasily Karasev	Sergey Karasev	Basketball	Russia
Ann-Marie Karlsson	Frida Karlsson	Cross-country skiing	Sweden
Dinesh Karthik	Dipika Pallikal Karthik	Cricket / Squash	India
	Rob Kearney, Dave Kearney	Rugby union	Ireland
Frederick Keeping	Michael Keeping	Cycle sport Association football	United Kingdom (England)
Erwin Keller	Carsten Keller, Andreas Keller	Field hockey	Germany
Carsten Keller	Natascha Keller, Florian Keller	Field hockey	Germany
Shannon Kelley; Mary Lou Retton	McKenna Kelley	American football / Gymnastics	United States
John B. Kelly Sr.	John B. Kelly Jr.	Rowing	United States
John B. Kelly Sr. (grandfather)	Albert Grimaldi (grandson), Caroline Grimaldi (granddaughter)	Rowing; Bobsleigh; Auto racing	United States; Monaco
Kembo Uba Kembo	Jirès Kembo Ekoko	Association football	Zaire; France
Peter Kennaugh (cyclist father), Jackie Kennaugh (Time trial cycling mother)	Peter Kennaugh, Tim Kennaugh	Road bicycle racing	United Kingdom (Isle of Man)
Stephen Kenny	Eoin Kenny	Association football	Ireland; United Kingdom (Northern Ireland)
	Sinead Kerr, John Kerr	Figure skating	Great Britain (Scotland)
Mohammad Khadem	Amir Reza Khadem, Rasoul Khadem	Wrestling	Iran (Persia)
	Dmitri Kharine, Mikhail Kharin	Association football	Soviet Union; CIS; Russia
	Sami Khedira, Rani Khedira	Association football	Germany; Tunisia
	Kim Yeong-mi, Kim Kyeong-ae	Curling	South Korea
Mark Kinsella	Liam Kinsella, Alice Kinsella	Association football, Artistic gymnastics	Ireland; Great Britain (England)
Steve Kinser, Randy Kinser	Kraig Kinser	Auto racing	United States
Erny Kirchen	Kim Kirchen	Cycle sport	Luxembourg
	Emanuel Kišerlovski, Robert Kišerlovski	Road bicycle racing	Croatia
Bára Skaale Klakstein	Eyðvør Klakstein	Association football	Faroe Islands
	Vitali Klitschko, Wladimir Klitschko	Boxing	Ukraine
	Markis Kido, Bona Septano, Pia Zebadiah Bernadet	Badminton	Indonesia
Dzintar Klavan	Ragnar Klavan	Association football	Estonia
Jürgen Klinsmann	Jonathan Klinsmann	Association football	Germany; United States
Kenneth Kluivert (grandfather)	Patrick Kluivert (father)	Association football	Suriname; Netherlands
Patrick Kluivert (father)	Justin Kluivert, Ruben Kluivert, Shane Kluivert (grandsons)	Association football	Netherlands
Servais Knaven, Natascha den Ouden	Mirre Knaven	Cycle sport	Netherlands
Gerrie Knetemann	Roxane Knetemann	Road bicycle racing	Netherlands
	Junshirō Kobayashi, Ryoyu Kobayashi	Ski jumping	Japan
Martin Koeman	Ronald Koeman, Erwin Koeman	Association football	Netherlands
	Elias Kolega, Samuel Kolega	Alpine skiing	Croatia
	Arouna Koné, Bakari Koné	Association football	Ivory Coast
Mitsuya Konno	Kamatani Masakatzu	Sumo	Japan
Valery Konovalov (in Lithuanian), Laima Zilporytė	Ignatas Konovalovas	Cycle sport	Russia; Lithuania
Wolfgang Konrad	Patrick Konrad	Middle-distance running / Cycle sport	Austria
	John Konrads, Ilsa Konrads	Swimming	Australia
	Tomáš Kopecký, Matyáš Kopecký, Julia Kopecký	Cycle sport	Czech Republic
Nils Koppang	Nina Koppang	Fencing, Handball	Norway; Sweden
Petr Korda; Regina Rajchrtová	Jessica Korda, Nelly Korda, Sebastian Korda	Tennis / Golf	Czechoslovakia; Czech Republic; United States
Peoria Koshiba	Sydney Francisco	Sprint (running)	Palau
Ante Kostelić	Ivica Kostelić, Janica Kostelić	Handball, alpine skiing	Croatia
	Carolina Kostner, Simon Kostner	Figure skating Ice hockey	Italy
	Jakub Kot, Maciej Kot	Ski jumping	Poland
Jason Koumas	Lewis Koumas	Association football	United Kingdom (Wales)
	Niko Kovač, Robert Kovač	Association football	Croatia
	Richard Krajicek, Michaëlla Krajicek	Tennis	Netherlands
Zlatko Kranjčar	Niko Kranjčar	Association football	Croatia
	Michel Kreder, Raymond Kreder	Road bicycle racing	Netherlands
Roman Kreuziger Sr.	Roman Kreuziger	Road bicycle racing	Czech Republic
	Alison Kreviazuk, Lynn Kreviazuk, Cheryl Kreviazuk	Curling	Canada
Rúnar Kristinsson	Rúnar Alex Rúnarsson	Association football	Iceland
Tommy Kristoffersson	Johan Kristoffersson	Auto racing	Sweden
	Zuzana Kučová, Kristína Kučová	Tennis	Slovakia
Aleksey Kudryavtsev	Yana Kudryavtseva	Swimming / Gymnastics	Soviet Union (Russian SFSR); Russia
	Dmitry Kulagin, Mikhail Kulagin	Basketball	Russia
	Kristian Kulset, Sindre Kulset, Magnus Kulset, Johannes Kulset	Road bicycle racing	Norway
	Karin Künzle, Christian Künzle	Figure skating	Switzerland
	Anastasiya Kuzmina, Anton Shipulin	Biathlon	Slovakia; Russia
	Abdul Kader Kardaghli, Ahmed Kurdughli	Association football	Syria
Kazuhiro Kuroda	Hiroki Kuroda	Baseball	Japan
	Karen Kwan, Michelle Kwan	Figure skating	United States
Lee Labrada	Hunter Labrada	Bodybuilding	United States
	Mathieu Ladagnous, Caroline Ladagnous	Cycle sport Rugby union	France
Jacques Laffite	Margot Laffite	Motorsport	France
	Jean-Philippe Lamoureux, Jacques Lamoureux, Mario Lamoureux, Jocelyne Lamoureux, Monique Lamoureux	Ice hockey	United States
Jan Lammers	René Lammers	Motorsport	Netherlands
Frank Lampard Sr.	Frank Lampard	Association football	United Kingdom (England)
Santiago Lange	Yago Lange, Klaus Lange	Sailing	Argentina
	Nicolás Lapentti, Giovanni Lapentti	Tennis	Ecuador
Barry Larkin	Shane Larkin	Baseball / Basketball	United States
Henrik Larsson	Jordan Larsson	Association football, Floorball	Sweden
Lars Larsson	Robin Larsson	Rallycross	Sweden
Niki Lauda	Mathias Lauda	Motorsport	Austria
Finn Laudrup	Michael Laudrup, Brian Laudrup	Association football	Denmark
Michael Laudrup	Mads Laudrup, Andreas Laudrup	Association football	Denmark
	Renaud Lavillenie, Valentin Lavillenie	Track and field	France
Alan Lawson	Rory Lawson	Rugby union	United Kingdom (Scotland)
Eddie Laure	EJ Laure, Eya Laure	Basketball / Volleyball	Philippines
	Joe Laurinaitis, Marc Laurinaitis, John Laurinaitis	Professional wrestling	United States
Joe Laurinaitis	James Laurinaitis	Professional wrestling / American football	United States
Bob Lazier	Buddy Lazier, Jaques Lazier	Auto racing	United States
Buddy Lazier	Flinn Lazier	Auto racing, Alpine skiing	United States
	Camille Leblanc-Bazinet, Rachel Leblanc-Bazinet	CrossFit; Weightlifting	Canada
Hervé Leclerc	Charles Leclerc, Arthur Leclerc	Auto sport	Monaco
Yvon Ledanois	Kévin Ledanois	Cycle sport	France
Walter Ledgard Sr.	Walter Ledgard Jr.	Swimming	Peru
Walter Ledgard Jr.	Tony Ledgard	Swimming / Cycle sport	Peru
Gerald Lee, Sr.	Gerald Lee, Jr.	Basketball	United States; Finland
	Leron Lee, Leon Lee	Baseball	United States
Leon Lee	Derrek Lee	Baseball	United States
Lee Jong-beom	Lee Jung-hoo	Baseball	South Korea
Rob Lee	Olly Lee, Elliot Lee	Association football	United Kingdom (England)
	Al Leiter, Mark Leiter	Baseball	United States
Mark Leiter	Mark Leiter Jr.	Baseball	United States
	Jerko Leko, Ivan Leko	Association football	Croatia
Lela	Richarlyson, Alecsandro	Association football	Brazil
Irina Lenskiy	Olga Lenskiy	Track and field	Israel
	Aaron Lescott, Joleon Lescott	Association football	United Kingdom (England)
	Maya Le Tissier, Alex Scott	Association football	United Kingdom (England)
	Kelvin van der Linde, Sheldon van der Linde	Motorsport	South Africa
	Andreas Linger, Wolfgang Linger	Luge	Austria
Peter Litchfield	Max Litchfield, Joe Litchfield	Association football / Swimming	United Kingdom (England)
Olavi Litmanen, Liisa Litmanen	Jari Litmanen	Association football	Finland
	Jacqui Little, Skylar Little	Association football	United States
Valeri Liukin; Anna Kotchneva	Nastia Liukin	Gymnastics	Soviet Union (Kazakh SSR); Soviet Union (Russian SFSR); United States
	José Luis Llorente, Paco Llorente, Toñin Llorente (in Spanish), Julio Llorente	Basketball / Association football	Spain
José Luis Llorente	Sergio Llorente, Juan Llorente	Basketball	Spain
Paco Llorente	Marcos Llorente	Association football	Spain
	Hugo Lloris, Gautier Lloris	Association football	France
Clive Lloyd	Jason Clive Lloyd	Cricket, association football	West Indies; Guyana
	Kelvin Lomax, Kieran Trippier	Association football	United Kingdom (England)
Howie Long	Chris Long, Kyle Long	American football	United States
David Longstaff	Sean Longstaff, Matty Longstaff	Ice hockey / Association football	United Kingdom (England)
José Antonio Lopetegui (in Spanish)	Julen Lopetegui	Harri-jasotzaileak; Association football	Spain
	Erazem Lorbek, Domen Lorbek, Klemen Lorbek	Basketball	Slovenia
	Lene Løseth, Nina Haver-Løseth, Mona Løseth	Alpine skiing	Norway
	Tommy Løvenkrands, Peter Løvenkrands	Association football	Denmark
	Cristiano Lucarelli, Alessandro Lucarelli	Association football	Italy
	Derrick Luckassen, Kevin Brobbey, Brian Brobbey	Association football	Ghana; Netherlands
	Luisão, Alex Silva	Association football	Brazil
	Tobias Ludvigsson, Fredrik Ludvigsson	Road bicycle racing	Sweden
	Ron Lugbill, Jon Lugbill	Canoe slalom	United States
	Leila Luik, Liina Luik, Lily Luik	Long-distance running	Estonia
Henrik Lundgaard	Christian Lundgaard	Auto racing	Denmark
Arie Luyendyk	Arie Luyendyk Jr.	Auto racing	Netherlands
	Allan Lyburn, William Lyburn	Curling	Great Britain (Scotland); Canada
Kevin Lyles	Noah Lyles, Josephus Lyles	Track and field	United States
Michael Lynagh	Louis Lynagh, Tom Lynagh	Rugby union	Australia; Italy; Great Britain (England)
	Patricio Mac Allister, Carlos Mac Allister	Association football	Argentina
Carlos Mac Allister	Kevin Mac Allister, Francis Mac Allister, Alexis Mac Allister	Association football	Argentina
Monica MacDonald	Brendan Kerry, Chantelle Kerry	Figure skating	Australia
Laurent Madouas	Valentin Madouas	Road bicycle racing	France
Tyler Magner, Alexis Magner		Road bicycle racing	United States
Glenn Magnusson	Kim Magnusson	Road bicycle racing	Sweden
Jan Magnussen	Kevin Magnussen	Auto racing	Denmark
Pat Mahomes	Patrick Mahomes	Baseball / American football	United States
	Sebastian Mai, Lars Lukas Mai	Association football	Germany
	Hermann Maier, Alexander Maier	Alpine skiing Snowboarding	Austria
Otto Maier Zeuner (in Catalan)	Enrique Maier, Maria Isabel Maier	Association football Tennis	Germany; Spain
	Jean Majerus, Jacques Majerus	Cycle sport	Luxembourg
Cesare Maldini	Paolo Maldini	Association football	Italy
Paolo Maldini	Christian Maldini, Daniel Maldini	Association football	Italy
Karl Malone	Cheryl Ford, Demetress Bell	Basketball / American football	United States
Yulia Berberian-Maleeva	Manuela Maleeva, Katerina Maleeva, Magdalena Maleeva	Tennis	Bulgaria
Jean-Luc Manaudou, Olga Schippers	Nicolas Manaudou, Laure Manaudou, Florent Manaudou	Handball / Badminton / Swimming	France; Netherlands
	Nick Mangold, Holley Mangold	American football / Weightlifting	United States
Archie Manning	Peyton Manning, Eli Manning	American football	United States
	Predrag Manojlović, Nenad Manojlović	Water polo	Serbia
Nigel Mansell	Leo Mansell, Greg Mansell	Auto racing Road bicycle racing	United Kingdom (England,Isle of Man)
	Diego Maradona, Hugo Maradona, Raúl Maradona	Association football	Argentina
Diego Maradona	Diego Sinagra	Association football / Beach soccer	Argentina; Italy
Marcelo	Enzo Alves	Association football	Brazil; Spain
	Christophe Marchand, Xavier Marchand	Swimming	France
Xavier Marchand, Céline Bonnet	Léon Marchand	Swimming	France
Kevork Mardikian	Mardik Mardikian	Association football	Syria
	Anne Kristi Marken, Ingeborg Helen Marken	Cross-country skiing, alpine skiing	Norway
Dmitri Markov	Oleg Markov	Pole vault / Australian rules football	Belarus; Australia
	Barry Markus, Kelly Markus	Cycle sport	Netherlands
	Riejanne Markus, Femke Markus	Cycle sport	Netherlands
	Marc Márquez, Álex Márquez	Motorcycle racing	Spain
Alvin Martin	David Martin, Joe Martin	Association football	United Kingdom (England)
Neil Martin	Dan Martin	Cycle sport	Great Britain (England); Ireland
Mariano Martínez	Miguel Martinez, Yannick Martinez	Cycle sport	France
Miguel Martinez	Lenny Martinez	Cycle sport	France
	Pierluigi Martini, Oliver Martini	Motorsport	Italy
	Matteo Marsaglia, Francesca Marsaglia	Alpine skiing	Italy
John Barasa Masai	Moses Ndiema Masai, Linet Masai, Dennis, Ndiema and Magdaline	Track and field	Kenya
Greg Massialas	Alexander Massialas	Fencing	Greece; United States
	Matthew Massie, Nicholas Massie	Professional wrestling Tag team	United States
Émile Masson Sr.	Émile Masson Jr.	Road bicycle racing	Belgium
Juan Mata Rodríguez	Juan Mata García	Association football	Spain
	Mario Matt, Andreas Matt, Michael Matt	Alpine skiing / Ski cross / Alpine skiing	Austria
	Barbara Matić, Brigita Matić	Judo	Croatia
	Nemanja Matić, Uroš Matić	Association football	Serbia
Maria Mattheussens-Fikkers	Marieke Veenhoven-Mattheussens	Field hockey	Netherlands
Bruce Matthews	Kevin Matthews, Jake Matthews	American football	United States
Clay Matthews Sr.	Clay Matthews Jr., Bruce Matthews	American football	United States
Clay Matthews Jr.	Clay Matthews III, Casey Matthews	American football	United States
Mavuba Mafuila	Rio Mavuba	Association football	Zaire; France
Martin Max	Philipp Max	Association football	Germany
Butch May	Misty May-Treanor	Volleyball	United States
Helmut Mayer	Matthias Mayer	Alpine skiing	Austria
Matthew Maynard	Tom Maynard	Cricket	England; Wales
Floyd Mayweather Sr.	Floyd Mayweather Jr.	Professional boxing	United States
Mazinho	Thiago, Rafinha	Association football	Brazil; Spain
Wilfrid Mbappé, Fayza Lamari	Kylian Mbappé, Ethan Mbappé	Association football, Handball	France
Andy McCall	Stuart McCall	Association football	United Kingdom (Scotland)
	Rex McCandless, Cromie McCandless	Motorcycle racing	United Kingdom (Northern Ireland)
	James McClean, Patrick McClean	Association football	Ireland
Peter McColgan, Liz McColgan (divorced), John Nuttall (stepfather)	Eilish McColgan	Track and field	United Kingdom (Northern Ireland; Scotland; England))
	Robby McCrorie, Ross McCrorie	Association football	United Kingdom (Scotland)
	John McEnroe, Patrick McEnroe	Tennis	United States
John McGeady	Aiden McGeady	Association football	United Kingdom (Scotland); Ireland
Felix McGrath	Atle Lie McGrath	Alpine skiing	United States; Norway
	Kirsty McGuinness, Caitlin McGuinness	Association football, Gaelic football	United Kingdom (Northern Ireland)
	Mark McGwire, Dan McGwire	Baseball / American football	United States
Shirley McIntosh, Donald McIntosh	Jennifer McIntosh, Seonaid McIntosh	Shooting sports	Great Britain (Scotland)
Ron McKeon	Emma McKeon, David McKeon	Swimming	Australia
	Taylor McKeown, Kaylee McKeown	Swimming	Australia
	Steve McKinney, Seth McKinney	American football	United States
McLean family		Rugby union	Australia
	Willie McLean, Jim McLean, Tommy McLean	Association football	United Kingdom (Scotland)
McMahon family		Professional wrestling	United States
Stuart McManus	Sara McManus	Association football / Curling	United Kingdom (Scotland); Sweden
Hammy McMillan	Hammy McMillan Jr.	Curling	Great Britain (Scotland)
	John McNally, Caty McNally	Tennis	United States
Jimmy McRae	Alister McRae, Colin McRae	Rallying	United Kingdom (Scotland)
	Francis McStay, Willie McStay, Jimmy McStay	Association football	United Kingdom (Scotland)
	Willie McStay, Paul McStay, Ray McStay	Association football	United Kingdom (Scotland)
	Loïc Meillard, Mélanie Meillard	Alpine skiing	Switzerland
	Kerrie Meares, Anna Meares	Cycle sport	Australia
	Roger Mears, Rick Mears	Auto racing	United States
Roger Mears	Casey Mears	Auto racing	United States
Rick Mears	Clint Mears	Auto racing	United States
Azmi Mohamed Megahed	Amir Azmy	Volleyball / Association football	Egypt
Paul Meier, Heike Henkel	Marlene Meier	Sport of athletics	Germany
	Alexander Michel Melki, Felix Michel Melki	Association football	Lebanon; Sweden
	Jürgen Melzer, Gerald Melzer	Tennis	Austria
	Haxhi Mema, Ali Mema, Osman Mema	Association football	Albania
Ali Mema	Ardian Mema	Association football	Albania
Haxhi Mema	Sulejman Mema	Association football	Albania
Andrés Mendieta	Gaizka Mendieta	Association football	Spain
Dino Meneghin	Andrea Meneghin	Basketball	Italy
Eddy Merckx	Axel Merckx	Cycle sport	Belgium
Axel Merckx, Lotte Kopecky		Cycle sport	Belgium
Iryna Merkushyna	Anastasiya Merkushyna, Oleksandra Merkushyna	Biathlon	Ukraine
Terry Metcalf	Eric Metcalf	American football	United States
	John Metgod, Edward Metgod	Association football	Netherlands
	Cameron Meyer, Travis Meyer	Cycle sport	Australia
	Jonathan Midol, Bastien Midol	Ski cross	France
Borislav Mihaylov; Maria Petrova	Nikolay Mihaylov	Association football / Rhythmic gymnastics	Bulgaria
Biser Mihaylov	Borislav Mihaylov or Borislav Mihaylov (in Bulgarian), Ruslan Mihaylov (in Bulgarian)	Association football	Bulgaria
Juho Mikkonen	Kerttu Niskanen, Ivo Niskanen	Cross-country skiing	Finland
	Jonathan Milan, Matteo Milan	Cycle sport	Italy
	Jack Milburn, George Milburn, Jim Milburn, Stanley Milburn	Association football	United Kingdom (England)
Vladimir Milić	Marko Milič	Track and field / Basketball	Yugoslavia (Serbia); Slovenia
Nikola Milinković, Milana Savić	Sergej Milinković-Savić, Vanja Milinković-Savić	Association football / Basketball	Serbia
	Diego Milito, Gabriel Milito	Association football	Argentina
	Mark Militano, Melissa Militano	Figure skating	United States
	Lotte Miller, Hanna Miller, William Miller (triplets) (in Norwegian)	Triathlon / Taekwondo / Volleyball	Norway
	Darrell Miller, Reggie Miller, Cheryl Miller	Baseball / Basketball	United States
Lennox Miller	Inger Miller	Sprint (running)	Jamaica; United States
Danny Mills	George Mills, Stanley Mills	Association football, Running	Great Britain (England)
Nicola Minali	Riccardo Minali	Road bicycle racing	Italy
	Rosi Mittermaier, Evi Mittermaier	Alpine skiing	Germany
	Yasutoshi Miura, Kazuyoshi Miura	Association football	Japan
	Yoshinobu Miyake, Yoshiyuki Miyake	Olympic weightlifting	Japan
Yoshiyuki Miyake	Hiromi Miyake	Olympic weightlifting	Japan
	Gilberto, Nélio, Nilde	Association football	Brazil; El Salvador
Dragan Mladenović	Kristina Mladenovic	Handball / Tennis	Yugoslavia; France
Hamlet Mkhitaryan	Henrikh Mkhitaryan	Association football	Armenia
	Erik Mobärg, David Mobärg, Linnea Mobärg	Ski cross	Sweden
	Danny Moir, Scott Moir	Ice dancing	Canada
	Manfred Mölgg, Manuela Mölgg	Alpine skiing	Italy
	Francesco Molinari, Edoardo Molinari	Golf	Italy
	Amanda Moll, Hana Moll	Pole vault	United States
Mitsuhiro Momota	Mitsuo Momota, Yoshihiro Momota	Professional wrestling / Sumo	Japan; North Korea
	Maria Monko, Ksenia Monko	Ice dancing	Russia
Juan Pablo Montoya	Sebastián Montoya	Auto racing	Colombia
Aston Moore	Jonathan Moore	Track and field	Jamaica; United Kingdom (England)
Roger Moran	Scott Moran	Hillclimbing	United Kingdom (England)
Old Tom Morris	Young Tom Morris	Golf	United Kingdom (Scotland)
	Enzo Moser, Aldo Moser, Francesco Moser	Cycle sport	Italy
Diego Moser	Moreno Moser, Leonardo Moser, Matteo Moser	Cycle sport	Italy
Francesco Moser	Ignazio Moser,	Cycle sport	Italy
Alfred Moss	Stirling Moss, Pat Moss	Auto racing	United Kingdom (England)
Charly Mottet	Eva Mottet	Road bicycle racing	France
	Mbo Mpenza, Émile Mpenza	Association football	Belgium
Josef Mucha	Karolína Muchová	Association football / Tennis	Czechoslovakia; Czech Republic
	Shabazz Muhammad, Asia Muhammad	Basketball / Tennis	United States
	Elena Muhhina, Sergei Muhhin	Figure skating	Estonia
	Paul Mullen, Eoin Mullen	Rugby union, cycle sport	United States; Ireland
	Cathy Muller, Yvan Muller	Motorsport	France
	Nancy Murdoch, Neil Murdoch, David Murdoch	Curling	Great Britain (Scotland)
Gordon Muirhead	Glen Muirhead, Eve Muirhead, Thomas Muirhead	Curling	United Kingdom (Scotland)
	Dino Murić, Edo Murić	Basketball	Slovenia
	Satsuki Muramoto, Kana Muramoto	Figure skating	Japan
Shigenobu Murofushi	Koji Murofushi, Yuka Murofushi	Track and field	Japan
Jay Murphy	Erik Murphy, Alex Murphy	Basketball	United States; Finland; France
Judy Erskine Murray	Jamie Murray, Andy Murray	Tennis	United Kingdom (Scotland)
	Rosamund Musgrave, Andrew Musgrave	Cross-country skiing	United Kingdom (England)
Farhat Mustafin	Aliya Mustafina	Wrestling / Gymnastics	Soviet Union (Russian SFSR); Russia
	Yohan M'Vila, Yann M'Vila	Association football	Democratic Republic of the Congo; France
	Aldo Nadi, Nedo Nadi	Fencing	Italy
	Oliver Naesen, Lawrence Naesen	Road bicycle racing	Belgium
Shigeo Nagashima	Kazushige Nagashima	Baseball	Japan
Sándor Nagy Gabriella Remport	Zsuzsanna Nagy	Ice dancing	Hungary
Satoru Nakajima	Kazuki Nakajima, Daisuke Nakajima	Motorsport	Japan
	Yoshio Nakamura, Yukimasa Nakamura, Kenzo Nakamura	Judo	Japan
Annet Nakimbugwe	Hasifah Nassuna	Association football	Uganda
	Steve Nash, Martin Nash	Basketball / Association football	Canada
Vadim Naumov, Evgenia Shishkova	Maxim Naumov	Figure skating	Russia; United States
	Damien Nazon, Jean-Patrick Nazon	Road bicycle racing	France
Phil Neal	Ashley Neal	Association football	United Kingdom (England)
Gerhardt Neef	Melanie Neef	Association football / athletics	West Germany; Great Britain (Scotland)
	John Nemechek, Joe Nemechek	Auto racing	United States
Joe Nemechek	John Hunter Nemechek	Auto racing	United States
	Angelika Neuner, Doris Neuner	Luge	Austria
Christian Neureuther, Rosi Mittermaier	Felix Neureuther	Alpine skiing	Germany
Neville Neville	Gary Neville, Phil Neville, Tracey Neville	Cricket / Association football / Netball	United Kingdom (England)
Adrian Newey	Harry Newey	Auto racing	United Kingdom (England)
	Vincenzo Nibali, Antonio Nibali	Road bicycle racing	Italy
	Bryden Nicholas, Ella Nicholas	Canoe slalom	Cook Islands
	Chris Nicholson, Andrew Nicholson	Speed skating	New Zealand
	James Nicolson, Gavin Nicolson, Skye Nicolson	Boxing	Australia
	Scott Niedermayer, Rob Niedermayer	Ice hockey	Canada
Benny Nielsen	Mie Nielsen	Swimming	Denmark
	Laviai Nielsen, Lina Nielsen	Sprint (running)	Great Britain (England)
	Aldo de Nigris, Antonio de Nigris	Association football	Mexico
Chanoch Nissany	Roy Nissany	Auto racing	Israel
Zacharie Noah	Yannick Noah	Association football / Tennis	Cameroon; France
Yannick Noah	Joakim Noah	Tennis / Basketball	France; United States
Gifton Noel-Williams	Dejon Noel-Williams	Association football	United Kingdom (England); Grenada
	Rodrigo Nogueira, Rogério Nogueira	Mixed martial arts / Boxing	Brazil
Katsuya Nomura	Katsunori Nomura	Baseball	Japan
	Mathias Norsgaard, Emma Cecilie Norsgaard	Cycle sport	Denmark
	Petter Northug, Tomas Northug, Even Northug	Cross-country skiing	Norway
Olav of Norway	Harald of Norway	Sailing	Norway
	Jordan Norwood, Gabe Norwood	American football / Basketball	United States; Philippines
Mona-Liisa Nousiainen, Ville Nousiainen		Cross-country skiing	Finland
Benjamín Noval González	Benjamín Noval Suárez	Cycle sport	Spain
John Nuttall, Alison Wyeth	Hannah Nuttall, Luke Nuttall	Running	United Kingdom (England)
Chucks Nwoko and Udo Nwoko	Kyrian Nwoko	Association football	Malta
Sven Nys	Thibau Nys	Cycle sport	Belgium
	Noh Seon-yeong, Noh Jin-kyu	Speed skating	South Korea
Helga Nowitzki	Dirk Nowitzki, Silke Nowitzki	Basketball	Germany
	Hanna Öberg, Elvira Öberg	Biathlon	Sweden
Emerson Obiena	Ernest John Obiena	Pole vault	Philippines
Jim Ochowicz, Sheila Young	Elli Ochowicz	Cycle sport, speed skating	United States
Tommy O'Connell	Mike O'Connell, Tim O'Connell	American football Ice hockey	United States
	Sam O'Dea, Ben O'Dea	Beach volleyball	New Zealand
	Gary O'Donovan, Paul O'Donovan	Rowing	Ireland
Hans Erik Ødegaard	Martin Ødegaard	Association football	Norway
	Callum O'Dowda, Jade O'Dowda	Association football, Combined track and field events	Ireland; Great Britain (England)
Hitoshi Ogawa	Ryo Ogawa	Motorsport	Japan
	Kenji Ogiwara, Tsugiharu Ogiwara	Skiing	Japan
	Christine Ohuruogu, Victoria Ohuruogu	Sprint (running)	Great Britain (England)
Kristjan Oja	Regina Oja	Biathlon	Estonia
Paul Okon	Paul Okon-Engstler	Association football	Australia
	David O'Leary, Pierce O'Leary	Association football	Ireland
Pierce O'Leary	Ryan O'Leary	Association football	Ireland; United Kingdom (Scotland)
	Jamie Oleksiak, Penny Oleksiak	Ice hockey / Swimming	Canada
Brian Oliver	J. P. Tokoto	Basketball	United States
	Ivo Oliveira, Rui Oliveira	Cycle sport	Portugal
John Olver	Sam Olver	Rugby union	Great Britain (England)
	Eugene Omalla Jaimie Omalla	Sprint (running)	Netherlands; Uganda
	Iffy Onuora, Anyika Onuora	Association football / Athletics	Great Britain (Scotland); Great Britain (England)
	David Opoku-Fordjour, Asher Opoku-Fordjour	Rugby union	United Kingdom (England)
Patrick Ortlieb	Nina Ortlieb	Alpine skiing	Austria
	Mari Osaka, Naomi Osaka	Tennis	Japan
	Patrick O'Shaughnessy, Daniel O'Shaughnessy	Association football	Finland
Ivica Osim	Amar Osim	Association football	Bosnia and Herzegovina
Sonia O'Sullivan	Sophie O'Sullivan	Running	Ireland
Tatyana Ovechkina	Alexander Ovechkin	Basketball / Ice hockey	Soviet Union; Russia
	Steve Ovett, Nick Ovett	Middle-distance running / Luge	Great Britain (England)
Steve Ovett	Freddy Ovett	Middle-distance running / Cycle sport	Great Britain (England); Australia
Jonathan Palmer	Jolyon Palmer, Will Palmer	Auto racing	United Kingdom (England)
Ronak Pandit	Heena Sidhu	Shooting	India
Virginie Paquet	Arthur Rinderknech	Tennis	France
	Aurélien Paret-Peintre, Valentin Paret-Peintre	Road bicycle racing	France
	Park Seung-hi, Park Se-yeong	Speed skating	South Korea
Bobby Parks	Bobby Ray Parks Jr., Bobby Mark Parks	Basketball	United States; Philippines
Yves Parlier	Nicolas Parlier (in French)	Sailing	France
Reg Parnell	Tim Parnell	Motorsport	United Kingdom (England)
Alex Parnov	Vicky Parnov, Liz Parnov	Pole vault	Australia
Rafael Pascual	Rafael Pascual Jr.	Volleyball	Spain
	Irfan Pathan, Yusuf Pathan	Cricket	India
Riccardo Patrese	Lorenzo Patrese	Motorsport, Show jumping	Italy
Joseph Patrick	Lester Patrick, Frank Patrick	Ice Hockey	Canada
Lester Patrick	Lynn Patrick, Muzz Patrick	Ice Hockey	Canada
Lynn Patrick	Craig Patrick, Glenn Patrick, Lester Lee Patrick	Ice Hockey	Canada
Muzz Patrick	Dick Patrick	Ice Hockey	Canada
Stephen Patrick	Steve Patrick, James Patrick	Ice hockey	Canada
Alvin Patrimonio	Anna Christine Patrimonio, Anna Clarice Patrimonio	Basketball / Tennis	Philippines
	Claudio Pätz, Alina Pätz	Curling	Switzerland
John Paul Sr.	John Paul Jr.	Motorsport	United States
	María Paulina Pérez, Paula Andrea Pérez (twins)	Tennis	Colombia
	Eric, Gordon and Julian Pearce	Field hockey	Australia
Natalya Pechonkina	Viktor Chistiakov	Track and field	Russia
Dondinho	Pelé	Association football	Brazil
Pelé	Edinho	Association football	Brazil
	Francis Pélissier, Henri Pélissier, Charles Pélissier	Cycle sport	France
	Mauricio Pellegrino, Maximiliano Pellegrino	Association football	Argentina
Daryl Perkins	Shane Perkins	Track cycling	Australia; Russia
	Erik Pérez, Jair Pérez	Mixed martial arts	Mexico
Franck Perrot, Tone Marit Oftedal	Éric Perrot	Biathlon	France; Norway
	Silvia Persico, Davide Persico	Cycle sport	Italy
Nel Pessoa	Rodrigo Pessoa	Equestrianism	Brazil; France
Wolfgang Peters, Ulrich Peters	Violetta Oblinger-Peters	Canoe slalom	Germany
Yevgeny Petrashov	Denis Petrashov	Swimming	Kyrgyzstan
	Viktor Petrenko, Vladimir Petrenko	Figure skating	Soviet Union (Ukrainian SSR)
	Aleksandar Petrović, Dražen Petrović	Basketball	Croatia
Lee Petty	Richard Petty	Auto racing	United States
Richard Petty	Kyle Petty	Auto racing	United States
Kyle Petty	Adam Petty	Auto racing	United States
Mark Phillips, Anne, Princess Royal (Anne Phillips)	Zara Tindall	Equestrianism	United Kingdom (England)
Bum Phillips	Wade Phillips	American football	United States
Greg Phillips	Erin Phillips	Australian rules football (both), basketball (Erin)	Australia
Connie Carpenter-Phinney, Davis Phinney	Taylor Phinney	Road bicycle racing	United States
	Geeta Phogat, Babita Kumari	Wrestling	India
	Franck Piccard, Ian Piccard, Leila Piccard, Ted Piccard, Jeff Piccard	Alpine skiing	France
Jean Pickering	Shaun Pickering	Track and field	United Kingdom (England)
	Tom Pidcock, Joe Pidcock	Cycle sport	Great Britain (England)
	Sjaak Pieters, Peter Pieters	Cycle sport	Netherlands
Sjaak Pieters, Ans Dekker		Cycle sport, Artistic gymnastics	Netherlands
Peter Pieters	Roy Pieters, Amy Pieters	Cycle sport	Netherlands
	Gojko Pijetlović, Duško Pijetlović	Water polo	Serbia
	Daria Pikulik, Wiktoria Pikulik	Racing cyclist	Poland
Brian Pillman	Brian Pillman Jr.	American football Professional wrestling	United States
	Walter Pirinoli, Marco Pirinoli	Sailing	Italy
Nelson Piquet	Nelson Piquet Jr., Pedro Piquet	Auto racing	Brazil; Germany
	Bogdan Pishchalnikov, Darya Pishchalnikova, Kirill Pishchalnikov	Discus throw	Russia
	Claudio Pizarro, Diego Pizarro	Association football	Peru
	Miles Plumlee, Mason Plumlee, Marshall Plumlee	Basketball	United States
	Paul Pogba, Mathias Pogba, Florentin Pogba	Association football	France; Guinea
	Susan Polgar, Sofia Polgar, Judit Polgár	Chess	Hungary
	Dmitry Polyanski, Igor Andreyevich Polyanski	Triathlon	Russia
	Boonsak Ponsana, Salakjit Ponsana	Badminton	Thailand
Jyrki Ponsiluoma	Martin Ponsiluoma	Cross-country skiing, biathlon	Sweden
Mart Poom	Markus Poom	Association football	Estonia
Jean-Paul van Poppel, Leontine van der Lienden	Boy van Poppel, Danny van Poppel	Road bicycle racing	Netherlands
	Nicolas Portal, Sébastien Portal	Cycle sport	France
	Miguel Porteous, Nico Porteous	Freestyle skiing	New Zealand
	Tiffany Porter, Cindy Ofili	Track and field	United Kingdom (England)
	Kristaps Porziņģis, Jānis Porziņģis	Basketball	Latvia
Steve Potts	Dan Potts, Freddie Potts	Association football	United Kingdom (England)
	Peter Prevc, Domen Prevc, Cene Prevc, Nika Prevc	Ski jumping	Slovenia
Markus Prock	Hannah Prock	Luge	Austria
	Annemarie Moser-Pröll, Cornelia Pröll	Alpine skiing	Austria
	John Paine, Sumner Paine	Shooting sports	United States
Olivier Panis	Aurélien Panis	Auto racing	France
Mark Proctor	Senna Proctor	Motorsport	United Kingdom (England)
Alain Prost	Nico Prost	Auto racing	France
Jiří Prskavec	Jiří Prskavec	Canoe slalom	Czech Republic
	Pablo Punyed, Renato Punyed	Association football	El Salvador; Nicaragua; United States
	Joachim Puchner, Mirjam Puchner	Alpine skiing	Austria
Velibor Pudar	Lana Pudar	Association football Swimming	Bosnia and Herzegovina
Mark Pulisic	Christian Pulisic	Association football	United States
Pilo Pumaren	Derrick Pumaren, Franz Pumaren & Dindo Pumaren	Basketball	Philippines
Ferenc Puskás Sr.	Ferenc Puskás	Association football	Hungary; Spain
Eigil Ramsfjell	Maia Ramsfjell, Magnus Ramsfjell	Curling	Norway
Maria Rosa Quario	Federica Brignone	Alpine skiing	Italy
Nigel Quashie	Brayden Clarke	Association football	United Kingdom (Scotland); United Kingdom (Wales)
Derek Quinnell	Scott Quinnell, Craig Quinnell, Gavin Quinnell	Rugby union	United Kingdom (Wales)
	Nairo Quintana, Dayer Quintana	Road bicycle racing	Colombia
	José Alberto Quiñónez, Cristian Quiñónez	Mixed martial arts	Mexico
	Agnieszka Radwańska, Urszula Radwańska	Tennis	Poland
	Andreas Raelert, Michael Raelert	Triathlon	Germany
	Rafael, Fabio	Association football	Brazil
Bobby Rahal	Graham Rahal	Auto racing	United States
Bernard	Phil Rajzman	Volleyball / Surfing	Brazil
Munaf Ramadan	Ammar Ramadan	Association football	Syria
	Strahinja Rašović, Viktor Rašović	Water polo	Serbia
	Daniele Ratto, Rossella Ratto	Cycle sport	Italy
Bong Ravena	Kiefer Ravena, Thirdy Ravena, Danielle Ravena	Basketball; Volleyball	Philippines
Ken Read, Lynda Robbins	Erik Read, Jeffrey Read	Alpine skiing	Canada
Harry Redknapp	Jamie Redknapp	Association football	United Kingdom (England)
	Cathy Reed, Chris Reed, Allison Reed	Ice dancing	United States; Japan
John Regis, Jennifer Stoute	Renee Regis	Sprint (running)	Great Britain (England)
	Kjetil Rekdal, Sindre Rekdal	Association football	Norway
	Tomas Ress, Kathrin Ress	Basketball	Italy
Claudio Reyna, Danielle Reyna	Giovanni Reyna	Association football	United States
Bernardinho	Bruno Rezende	Volleyball	Brazil
Anfisa Reztsova	Daria Virolaynen, Kristina Reztsova	Biathlon	Russia
	Franck Ribéry, Steeven Ribéry	Association football	France
Glen Rice	Glen Rice Jr.	Basketball	United States
	Maurice Richard, Henri Richard	Ice Hockey	Canada
	Claudia Riegler, Manuela Riegler	Snowboarding	Austria
Leon Riley	Pat Riley, Lee Riley	Baseball Basketball American football	United States
Eusebio Ríos	Roberto Ríos	Association football	Spain
Nick Rimando, Jacqui Little		Association football	United States
Cal Ripken Sr.	Cal Ripken Jr., Billy Ripken	Baseball	United States
	Amy Roberts, Jessica Roberts	Cycle sport	Great Britain (Wales)
Kenny Roberts	Kenny Roberts Jr.	Motorcycle racing	United States
	Zane Robertson, Jake Robertson	Distance Running	New Zealand
	Desmond Robinson, Brian Robinson	Road bicycle racing	Great Britain
Brian Robinson	Louise Robinson	Road bicycle racing	Great Britain
	Bryan Robson, Gary Robson	Association football	United Kingdom (England)
	Stephen Roche, Laurence Roche	Road bicycle racing	Ireland
Stephen Roche	Nicolas Roche	Road bicycle racing	Ireland
	Christophe Rochus, Olivier Rochus	Tennis	Belgium
	Aaron Rodgers, Jordan Rodgers	American football	United States
	Anastasia Rodionova, Arina Rodionova	Tennis	Russia; Australia
Dennis Rodman	DJ Rodman, Trinity Rodman	Basketball / Association football	United States
	Francisco Rodríguez Araya, Ricardo Rodríguez (footballer), Roberto Rodríguez Araya	Association football	Switzerland
	José Luis Rodríguez, Aaron Rodríguez	Professional wrestling	Mexico
José Luis Rodríguez	José Alberto Rodríguez, Guillermo Rodríguez	Mixed martial arts / Professional wrestling	Mexico
	Pedro Rodríguez, Ricardo Rodríguez	Motorsport	Mexico
Eberhard Rösch	Michael Rösch	Biathlon	East Germany; Germany; Belgium
	Mariano Rojas, José Joaquín Rojas	Cycle sport	Spain
Oksana Romanenkova	Viktor Romanenkov	Figure skating	Estonia
Romário	Romarinho	Association football	Brazil
	Yoel Romero, Yoan Pablo Hernández	Wrestling / Boxing	Cuba; Germany
	Ronaldinho, Assis	Association football	Brazil
	Wayne Rooney, John Rooney	Association football	United Kingdom (England); Ireland
	Joe Root, Billy Root	Cricket	United Kingdom (England)
	Abigail Roper, Emily Roper	Artistic gymnastics	Great Britain (Wales)
Keke Rosberg	Nico Rosberg	Auto racing	Finland; Germany
Louis Rosier	Jean-Louis Rosier	Motorsport	France
Graziano Rossi	Valentino Rossi	Motorcycle racing	Italy
Jolanda de Rover	Kira Toussaint	Swimming	Netherlands
Harri Rovanperä	Kalle Rovanperä	Rallying	Finland
	Matthew Rowe, Luke Rowe	Cycle sport	United Kingdom (Wales)
	Joanna Rowsell Shand, Erick Rowsell	Cycle sport	United Kingdom (England)
	Maurício Rua, Murilo Rua	Mixed martial arts	Brazil
	Max Rüegg, Tony Rüegg	Bobsleigh	Switzerland
Tony Rüegg	Ralph Rüegg	Bobsleigh	Switzerland
	Anastasija Reiberger, Lisa Ryzih	Track and field	Germany
Virgil Runnels Jr.	Dustin Runnels, Cody Runnels	Professional wrestling	United States
	Bob Rutherford, Jock Rutherford, Sep Rutherford	Association football	United Kingdom (England)
Jock Rutherford	John Rutherford	Association football	United Kingdom (England)
Tony Rutter	Michael Rutter	Motorcycle racing	United Kingdom (England)
Christian Ruud	Casper Ruud	Tennis	Norway
Buddy Ryan	Rex Ryan, Rob Ryan	American football	United States
	Kendall Ryan, Alexis Ryan	Cycle sport	United States
	Johannes Rydzek, Coletta Rydzek	Nordic combined, Cross-country skiing	Germany
	Martina Sáblíková, Milan Sáblík	Speed skating, Cycle sport	Czech Republic
Arvydas Sabonis	Domantas Sabonis, Tautvydas Sabonis (in Spanish)	Basketball	Lithuania; United States
	Marat Safin, Dinara Safina	Tennis	Russia
	Juraj Sagan, Peter Sagan	Road bicycle racing	Slovakia
Bob Said	Boris Said	Motorsport	United States
	Rupa Saini, Krishna Saini, Prema Saini	Field hockey	India
Carlos Sainz	Carlos Sainz Jr.	Rallying / Auto racing	Spain
	Buvaisar Saitiev, Adam Saitiev	Wrestling	Russia (Chechnya)
Dragan Šakota	Dušan Šakota	Basketball	Serbia; Greece
Joe Saldana	Joey Saldana	Auto racing	United States
Hasan Salihamidžić	Nick Salihamidžić	Association football	Bosnia and Herzegovina
Oleg Salenko	Roman Salenko	Association football	Soviet Union; Ukraine; Russia
István Sallói	Dániel Sallói	Association football	Hungary
Yuliya Salnikova	Stefanos Tsitsipas, Petros Tsitsipas	Tennis	Soviet Union (Russia); Greece
Nino Salukvadze	Tsotne Machavariani	Shooting sports	Georgia
	Chupe Salvador, Gregorio Salvador	Association football	Equatorial Guinea; Spain
Christopher Samba	Tyrone Samba	Association football	Republic of the Congo; France
	Adriana Samuel, Alexandre Ramos Samuel	Volleyball	Brazil
	Emilio Sánchez, Javier Sánchez, Arantxa Sánchez Vicario	Tennis	Spain
	Luis León Sánchez, Pedro León Sánchez	Road bicycle racing / Association football	Spain
	Jesús Sánchez Jover, Francisco Sánchez Jover	Volleyball	Spain
Francisco Sánchez Jover	Javier Sánchez Carreres	Volleyball	Spain
	Sergio Santamaría, Luija Santamaría (in Spanish)	Association football	Spain
Sergio Santamaría	Diana Santamaría (in Spanish)	Association football Swimming	Spain
	Dindin Santiago-Manabat, Jaja Santiago	Volleyball	Philippines
	Luguelín Santos, Juander Santos	Sprinting	Dominican Republic
	Lisa Sargeant, Kristy Sargeant	Figure skating	Canada
Nobuo Satō, Kumiko Sato	Yuka Sato	Figure skating	Japan
Takuma Sato	Rintaro Sato	Motorsport	Japan
Robbie Savage	Charlie Savage	Association football	United Kingdom (Wales)
Ivan Savostikov	Kirill Savostikov	Association football	Belarus
	James Scanlon, Luca Scanlon	Association football	United Kingdom (Gibraltar)
Roland Schär	Michael Schär	Road bicycle racing	Switzerland
	Ian Scheckter, Jody Scheckter	Auto racing	South Africa
Jody Scheckter	Tomas Scheckter, Toby Scheckter	Auto racing	South Africa
	Marlies Schild, Bernadette Schild	Alpine skiing	Austria
Johny Schleck	Fränk Schleck, Andy Schleck	Road bicycle racing	Luxembourg
Peter Schmeichel	Kasper Schmeichel	Association football	Denmark
	Anna Karolína Schmiedlová, Kristína Schmiedlová	Tennis	Slovakia
Paul Scholes	Alicia Scholes	Association football, Netball	United Kingdom (England)
	Michael Schumacher, Ralf Schumacher	Auto racing	Germany
Michael Schumacher, Corinna Schumacher	Mick Schumacher	Auto racing, equestrianism	Germany
Ralf Schumacher	David Schumacher	Auto racing	Germany
	Dave Schultz, Mark Schultz	Wrestling	United States
	Christof Schwaller, Andreas Schwaller	Curling	Switzerland
Christof Schwaller	Yannick Schwaller, Kim Schwaller	Curling	Switzerland
Andreas Schwaller	Xenia Schwaller	Curling	Switzerland
	Kathrin Schweinberger, Christina Schweinberger (twins)	Road bicycle racing	Austria
	Bastian Schweinsteiger, Tobias Schweinsteiger	Association football	Germany
	Miles Scotson, Callum Scotson	Cycle sport	Australia
	Jonny Searle, Greg Searle	Rowing	United Kingdom (England)
	Valentyna Semerenko, Vita Semerenko	Biathlon	Ukraine
Ayrton Senna (uncle)	Bruno Senna	Auto racing	Brazil
Roy Sentjens	Sente Sentjens	Road bicycle racing	Belgium; Netherlands
	Amos Serem, Edmund Serem	Steeplechase	Kenya
Chico Serra	Daniel Serra	Motor sport	Brazil
Ekramy El-Shahat	Sherif Ekramy	Association football	Egypt
Shang Yi, Wu Na	Shang Juncheng	Association football Table tennis Tennis	China
	Alec Shankly, Jimmy Shankly, John Shankly, Bob Shankly, Bill Shankly	Association football	United Kingdom (Scotland)
Carlo Sharma	Fifi Sharma	Basketball / Volleyball	Philippines
Bob Sharp	Scott Sharp	Auto racing	United States
	Cassie Sharpe, Darcy Sharpe	Freestyle skiing / Snowboarding	Canada
	Sterling Sharpe, Shannon Sharpe	American football	United States
Jack Shea	Jim Shea Sr.	Speed skating / Skiing	United States
Jim Shea Sr.	Jimmy Shea	Skiing / Skeleton	United States
Bryan Shelton	Ben Shelton	Tennis	United States
Teddy Sheringham	Charlie Sheringham	Association football	United Kingdom (England)
	Antonina Shevchenko, Valentina Shevchenko	Mixed martial arts	Kyrgyzstan
	Maia Shibutani, Alex Shibutani	Ice dancing	United States
Peter Shilton	Sam Shilton	Association football	United Kingdom (England)
Ahmed Shobair	Mostafa Shobeir	Association football	Egypt
Natalya Shubenkova	Sergey Shubenkov	Track and field	Russia
	Suad Šehović, Sead Šehović	Basketball	Montenegro
	Juris Šics, Andris Šics	Luge	Latvia
Sidek Abdullah Kamar	Misbun, Razif, Jalani, Rahman and Rashid Sidek	Badminton	Malaysia
Misbun Sidek	Misbun Ramdan Misbun	Badminton	Malaysia
	Christina Siggaard, Soren Malling Siggaard	Cycle sport	Denmark
Rui Silva	Patricia Silva	Running	Portugal
Ben Sim	Sami Kennedy-Sim	Cross-country skiing / Freestyle skiing	Australia
	Cristian Javier Simari Birkner, María Belén Simari Birkner, Macarena Simari Birkner	Alpine skiing	Argentina
Diego Simeone	Giovanni Simeone, Gianluca Simeone, Giuliano Simeone	Association football	Argentina; Spain
Dave Simmons	Ben Simmons	Basketball	United States; Australia
	Quinn Simmons, Colby Simmons	Road bicycle racing	United States
Phil Simms	Chris Simms, Matt Simms	American football	United States
	Pascal Simon, Régis Simon, Jérôme Simon, François Simon	Cycle sport	France
Jeff Simpson	Russell Simpson	Tennis	New Zealand
Milkha Singh	Nirmal Kaur	Athletics / Volleyball	India
	Valent Sinković, Martin Sinković	Rowing	Croatia
Alexei Sivakov, Aleksandra Koliaseva	Pavel Sivakov	Cycle sport	Russia; France
Willy Skibby	Jesper Skibby, Karina Skibby	Cycle sport	Denmark
Mickey Skinner	Zak Skinner	Rugby union, Para-athletics	Great Britain (England)
	Ann-Elen Skjelbreid, Liv Grete Skjelbreid	Biathlon	Norway
	Rozanne Slik, Ivar Slik	Cycle sport	Netherlands
Uiloq Slettemark, Øystein Slettemark	Ukaleq Slettemark, Sondre Slettemark, Inuk Slettemark	Biathlon	Denmark; Greenland
Anatoli Šmigun, Rutt Šmigun	Kristina Šmigun-Vähi, Katrin Šmigun	Cross-country skiing	Soviet Union (Estonian SSR); Estonia
	Assoli Slivets, Timofei Slivets	Freestyle skiing	Belarus
	Lotte Smiseth Sejersted, Adrian Smiseth Sejersted	Alpine skiing	Norway
Calvin Smith	Calvin Smith Jr.	Track and field	United States
	Chris Smith, Robin Smith	Cricket	United Kingdom (England)
	David Smith, Pete Smith	Curling	Great Britain (Scotland)
David Smith	Kyle Smith, Cammy Smith, Mili Smith	Curling	United Kingdom (Scotland)
	Laura Smulders, Merel Smulders	BMX racing	Netherlands
	Wesley Sneijder, Rodney Sneijder, Jeffrey Sneijder	Association football	Netherlands
	Sócrates, Raí	Association football	Brazil
	Bright Sodje, Efe Sodje, Sam Sodje, Akpo Sodje	Rugby league, rugby union, association football	United Kingdom (England); Nigeria
Tiit Sokk	Tanel Sokk, Sten Sokk	Basketball	Estonia
	Henning Solberg, Petter Solberg	Rallying	Norway
Petter Solberg	Oliver Solberg	Rallying	Norway; Sweden
	Enrique Solis, Julian Solís, Rafael Solis, Santos Solis	Boxing	Puerto Rico
Diego Soñora	Joel Soñora	Association football	Argentina; United States
Gøran Sørloth	Alexander Sørloth	Association football	Norway
	Scott Spann, Alexi Spann	Swimming	United States
John Spencer	Brad Spencer	Association football	United Kingdom (Scotland)
Leon Spinks, Michael Spinks	Leon Spinks Jr. Darrell Spinks, Cory Spinks	Boxing	United States
Alois Stadlober, Roswitha Steiner	Luis Stadlober, Teresa Stadlober	Cross-country skiing, alpine skiing	Austria
Cees Stam	Danny Stam	Bicycle racing	Netherlands
Hennie Stamsnijder	Tom Stamsnijder	Bicycle racing	Netherlands
Tony Stanger	George Stanger	Rugby union / Association football	Great Britain (Scotland); New Zealand
	Mitchell Starc, Brandon Starc	Cricket / High jump	Australia
Olafur Stefansson (uncle), Jon Arnor Stefansson (uncle)	Martin Hermannsson	Handball; Basketball	Finland
	Ed Stein, Brian Stein, Mark Stein	Association football	United Kingdom (England)
Guy Stéphan	Julien Stéphan, Guillaume Stéphan	Association football	France
John Stephens	Sloane Stephens	American football Tennis	United States
	Wayne Stetina, Dale Stetina	Cycle sport	United States
Dale Stetina	Peter Stetina	Cycle sport	United States
Dennis Stewart	Elliot Stewart	Judo; Paralympic judo	Great Britain (England)
Colin Stewart, Julie Fleeting		Association football	United Kingdom (Scotland)
Jim Stewart	Colin Stewart	Association football	United Kingdom (Scotland)
	Jimmy Stewart, Jackie Stewart	Auto racing	United Kingdom (Scotland)
Jackie Stewart	Paul Stewart	Auto racing	United Kingdom (Scotland)
Josef Stiegler	Resi Stiegler	Alpine skiing	Austria; United States
Hroar Stjernen	Andreas Stjernen	Ski jumping	Norway
John Stockton	David Stockton, Michael Stockton	Basketball	United States
	Luke Stoltman, Tom Stoltman	Strongman	United Kingdom (Scotland)
Gordon Strachan	Gavin Strachan, Craig Strachan	Association football	United Kingdom (Scotland)
Darryl Strawberry	D. J. Strawberry	Baseball / Basketball	United States
Hans Stuck	Hans-Joachim Stuck	Auto racing	Germany
Paul Sturrock	Blair Sturrock	Association football	United Kingdom (Scotland)
	Luis Suárez, Paolo Suárez	Association football	Uruguay; El Salvador
Vaso Subotić	Gavril Subotić	Water polo	FR Yugoslavia; Serbia
Lorenzo Styles	Lorenzo Styles Jr., Sonny Styles	American football	USA
	Cyril Suk, Helena Suková	Tennis	Czechoslovakia; Czech Republic
Sergei Sukhoruchenkov	Olga Zabelinskaya	Road bicycle racing	USSR (Russian SFSR); Russia
Clive Sullivan	Anthony Sullivan	Rugby league, Rugby union	Great Britain (Wales)
	Katie Summerhayes. Molly Summerhayes	Freestyle skiing	United Kingdom (England)
John Surtees	Henry Surtees	Motorsport	United Kingdom (England)
Sutter family		Ice hockey	Canada
	Gary Sutton, Shane Sutton	Road bicycle racing	Australia
Gary Sutton	Christopher Sutton	Road bicycle racing	Australia
Mike Sutton	Chris Sutton, John Sutton	Association football	United Kingdom (England)
Gunde Svan, Marie Svan	Julia Svan (Swedish), Ferry Svan	Cross-country skiing and Auto racing Skiing, Logger sports	Sweden
Gabriela Svobodová	Gabriela Koukalová	Biathlon	Czech Republic
	Allyson Swaby, Chantelle Swaby	Association football	Jamaica; United States
Oscar Swahn	Alfred Swahn	Shooting	Sweden
	Jack Swart, Stephen Swart	Road bicycle racing	New Zealand
Tomasz Świątek	Iga Świątek	Rowing, Tennis	Poland
	Maarten Swings, Bart Swings	Speed skating, inline speed skating	Belgium
	Bernadette Swinnerton, Catherine Swinnerton, Paul Swinnerton	Road bicycle racing	United Kingdom (England)
Steve Swisher	Nick Swisher	Baseball	United States
	Bernadette Szőcs, Hunor Szőcs	Table tennis	Romania
	Nana Takagi, Miho Takagi	Speed skating	Japan
Don Talbot, Jan Cameron (divorced)	Scott Talbot	Swimming	Australia
Marco Tamberi	Gianmarco Tamberi	High jump	Italy
	Joe Tandy, Nick Tandy	Motorsport	United Kingdom (England)
	Harry Tanfield, Charlie Tanfield	Cycle sport	United Kingdom (England)
	Josh Tarling, Finlay Tarling	Cycle sport	Great Britain (Wales)
Mosi Tatupu	Lofa Tatupu	American football	American Samoa; United States
Jeff Taylor	Jeffery Taylor	Basketball	United States; Sweden
Martin Taylor	Caleb Taylor	Association football	United Kingdom (England)
	Jeff Teague, Marquis Teague	Basketball	United States
Alvin Teng	Jeric Teng, Jeron Teng	Basketball	Philippines
	Niki Terpstra, Mike Terpstra	Cycle sport	Netherlands
	Brian-Paul Tesselaar, Jan-Willem Tesselaar	Association football	United Kingdom (Anguilla)
	Lars Teutenberg, Sven Teutenberg, Ina-Yoko Teutenberg	Cycle sport	Germany
Lars Teutenberg	Lea Lin Teutenberg, Tim Torn Teutenberg	Cycle sport	Germany
	Stefan Tewes, Jan-Peter Tewes	Field hockey	Germany
Mike Thackwell, Lisa Thackwell		Motor racing	New Zealand
Jonas Thern	Simon Thern	Association football	Sweden
Kurt Thiim	Nicki Thiim	Motorsport	Denmark
	Marielle Thompson, Broderick Thompson	Ski cross / Alpine skiing	Canada
Mychal Thompson	Mychel Thompson, Klay Thompson, Trayce Thompson	Basketball / Baseball	Bahamas; United States
	Þórður Guðjónsson, Bjarni Guðjónsson, Joey Guðjónsson, Björn Bergmann Sigurðarson	Association football	Iceland
Erik Thorstvedt	Kristian Thorstvedt	Association football	Norway
	Candide Thovex, Mirabelle Thovex	Freestyle skiing / Snowboarding	France
	Amédée Thubé, Gaston Thubé, Jacques Thubé	Sailing	France
Lilian Thuram	Marcus Thuram, Khéphren Thuram	Association football	France
Laurent Tillie, Caroline Keulen	Kim Tillie, Kévin Tillie, Killian Tillie	Volleyball / Basketball	France; Netherlands
	Dylan Timber, Jurriën Timber, Quinten Timber	Association football	Curaçao; Netherlands
	Maija Tīruma, Elīza Cauce	Luge	Latvia
Keith Tkachuk	Matthew Tkachuk, Brady Tkachuk	Ice hockey	United States
	Dorota Tlałka-Mogore, Małgorzata Tlałka-Mogore	Alpine skiing	Poland; France
Pauli Toivonen	Henri Toivonen, Harri Toivonen	Rallying; Auto racing	Finland
Mel Tom	Logan Tom	American football Volleyball	United States
	Susan Tooby, Angela Tooby	Track and field	United Kingdom (Wales)
Geoff Wightman, Susan Tooby	Jake Wightman	Track and field	United Kingdom (Wales, Scotland)
Dragutin Topić, Biljana Topić	Angelina Topić	Sport of athletics	Yugoslavia; Serbia and Montenegro; Serbia
	Ilia Topuria, Aleksandre Topuria	Mixed martial arts	Georgia; Spain
	Yaya Touré, Kolo Touré, Ibrahim Touré	Association football	Ivory Coast
Jorge Trezeguet	David Trezeguet	Association football	Argentina; France
	Emma Trott, Laura Kenny	Cycle sport	United Kingdom (England)
Pål Trulsen	Pia Trulsen	Curling	Norway
Mitsuo Tsukahara	Naoya Tsukahara	Artistic gymnastics	Japan
	Freddie Tuilagi, Henry Tuilagi, Alesana Tuilagi, Anitelea Tuilagi, Sanele Vavae Tuilagi, Manu Tuilagi	Rugby union	Samoa; United Kingdom (England)
Ian Tullett, Hayley Tullett		Track and field	Great Britain (England); Great Britain (Wales)
Jason Tunks, Lieja Tunks	Julia Tunks	Discus throw, Shot put	Canada; Netherlands
	Josh Turek, John Turek	Wheelchair basketball, Basketball	United States
Brian Tutt	Brianne Tutt	Ice hockey / Speed skating	Canada
Jerzy Twardokens	Eva Twardokens	Fencing / Alpine skiing	Poland; United States
	Panna Udvardy, Luca Udvardy	Tennis	Hungary
Ted Uhlaender	Katie Uhlaender	Baseball / Skeleton	United States
	Rory Underwood, Tony Underwood	Rugby Union	United Kingdom (England)
	Jerry Unser Jr., Bobby Unser, Al Unser	Auto racing	United States
Jerry Unser Jr.	Johnny Unser	Auto racing	United States
Bobby Unser	Robby Unser	Auto racing	United States
Al Unser	Al Unser Jr.	Auto racing	United States
Al Unser Jr.	Al Unser III	Auto racing	United States
Iñaki Urdangarin, Cristina de Borbón	Pablo Nicolás Sebastián Urdangarin y Borbón	Handball; Sailing	Spain
Rolando Uríos (in Spanish)	Rolando Uríos González	Handball	Cuba; Spain
	Alexander Uspenski, Vladimir Uspenski	Figure skating	Russia
	Fulvio Valbusa, Sabina Valbusa	Cross-country skiing	Italy
Martina van Berkel, Benoît Schwarz-van Berkel		Swimming, Curling	Switzerland
Jurgen van den Goorbergh	Zonta van den Goorbergh	Motorcycle racing	Netherlands
	Adri van der Poel, Jacques van der Poel	Cycle sport	Netherlands
Adri van der Poel (Raymond Poulidor French grandfather)	David van der Poel, Mathieu van der Poel	Road bicycle racing, cyclo-cross	Netherlands
	Sanne van Kerkhof, Yara van Kerkhof	Speed skating	Netherlands
Andy Van Slyke	Scott Van Slyke	Baseball	United States
Ernie Vandeweghe	Kiki VanDeWeghe, Tauna Vandeweghe	Basketball / Swimming	United States
Tauna Vandeweghe	CoCo Vandeweghe	Swimming / Tennis	United States
	Jelle Vanendert, Dennis Vanendert	Cycle sport	Belgium
Wim Vansevenant	Mauri Vansevenant	Road bicycle racing	Belgium
	Laurens Vanthoor, Dries Vanthoor	Motor racing	Belgium
	Dieter Vanthourenhout, Michael Vanthourenhout	Cycle sport	Belgium
	Sylvain Vasseur, Alain Vasseur	Road bicycle racing	France
Alain Vasseur	Cédric Vasseur, Loïc Vasseur	Road bicycle racing	France
Michael Vaughan	Archie Vaughan	Cricket	United Kingdom (England)
José Velázquez	José de Jesús Mendoza, José Alfredo Mendoza, Arturo Mendoza, Tomas Mendoza, Ray Mendoza Jr.	Professional wrestling	Mexico
	Martin Velits, Peter Velits (twins)	Road bicycle racing	Slovakia
	Julien Vermote, Alphonse Vermote (in Dutch)	Road bicycle racing	Belgium
Juan Ramón Verón	Juan Sebastián Verón	Association football	Argentina
Zoltán Verrasztó	Dávid Verrasztó, Evelyn Verrasztó	Swimming	Hungary
Jos Verstappen, Sophie Kumpen	Max Verstappen	Auto racing	Netherlands; Belgium
František Veselý (in Czech) (great-grandfather)	František Vesely (in Czech) (grandfather)	Association football	Czech Republic
František Veselý (in Czech) (grandfather)	František Veselý (father)	Association football	Czech Republic
František Veselý (father)	Daniel Veselý (in Czech), Lukáš Veselý	Association football	Czech Republic
Frédéric Vichot (uncle)	Arthur Vichot	Road bicycle racing	France
	Jean-Pierre Vidal, Vanessa Vidal	Alpine skiing	France
	Aurelio Vidmar, Tony Vidmar	Association football	Australia
Tony Vidmar	Mikayla Vidmar, Kane Vidmar	Association football	Australia
Roberto Vieri	Christian Vieri, Max Vieri	Association football	Italy; Australia
Jose Marcelo Vildoza	Luca Vildoza	Basketball	Argentina
	Gilles Villeneuve, Jacques Villeneuve (elder)	Auto racing	Canada
Gilles Villeneuve	Jacques Villeneuve	Auto racing	Canada
	Emilio Villoresi, Luigi Villoresi	Auto racing	Italy
Alexander Vinokourov	Alexandre Vinokurov, Nicolas Vinokurov	Cycle sport	Kazakhstan
	Elia Viviani, Attilio Viviani	Cycle sport	Italy
	Erik De Vlaeminck, Roger De Vlaeminck	Cycle sport	Belgium
Joško Vlašić	Blanka Vlašić, Nikola Vlašić	Athletics; Association football	Yugoslavia; Croatia
	Bailey Voisin, Callum Voisin	Motorsport	Switzerland; United Kingdom
	Gerrit Voorting, Adrie Voorting	Road bicycle racing	Netherlands
	Vozinha, Delmiro	Association football	Cape Verde
Petar Vukičević	Christina Vukicevic, Vladimir Vukicevic	Track and field	Yugoslavia (Serbia); Norway
Bill Vukovich (grandfather)	Bill Vukovich II (father)	Auto racing	United States
Bill Vukovich II (father)	Bill Vukovich III (grandson)	Auto racing	United States
Feʻao Vunipola	Mako Vunipola, Billy Vunipola	Rugby union	Tonga; New Zealand; United Kingdom (England); Australia
Jessie Wadworth	Brenda Wadworth	Archery	United Kingdom (England)
Walfridsson family (in German)		Auto sport	Sweden
	Kira Walkenhorst, Pia Walkenhorst	Beach volleyball	Germany
Chris Walker	Jessie Walker	Cycle sport	Great Britain (England)
	Danny Wallace, Ray Wallace, Rod Wallace	Association football	United Kingdom (England)
	George Wallace, Merv Wallace	Cricket	New Zealand
Merv Wallace	Gregory Wallace	Cricket	New Zealand
Jock Wallace Sr.	Jock Wallace Jr.	Association football	United Kingdom (Scotland)
	Alex Walsh, Gretchen Walsh	Swimming	United States
Bill Walton	Luke Walton	Basketball	United States
	Derek Warwick, Paul Warwick	Auto racing	United Kingdom (England)
George Weah	George Weah Jr., Timothy Weah	Association football	Liberia; United States
Christopher Wegelius	Charly Wegelius	Show jumping, Road bicycle racing	Finland; Great Britain (England)
	Steve Wegerle, Geoff Wegerle, Roy Wegerle	Association football, Golf	South Africa; United States
Steve Wegerle	Bryce Wegerle	Association football, Golf	South Africa; United States
Gert Weil, Ximena Restrepo	Martina Weil	Track and field	Chile; Colombia
David Weir	Jensen Weir	Association football	United Kingdom (Scotland); United Kingdom (England)
Robert Weir	Jillian Weir	Track and field	United Kingdom (England); Canada
Harti Weirather, Hanni Wenzel	Tina Weirather	Alpine skiing	Austria; Liechtenstein
	Paul Wellens, Johan Wellens, Leo Wellens	Cycle sport	Belgium
Leo Wellens	Tim Wellens	Cycle sport	Belgium
Bruce Wells	Jossi Wells, Byron Wells, Beau-James Wells, Jackson Wells	Freestyle skiing	New Zealand
	Lotta Udnes Weng, Tiril Udnes Weng	Cross-country skiing	Norway
	Hanni Wenzel, Andreas Wenzel, Petra Wenzel	Alpine skiing	Liechtenstein
Petra Wenzel	Jessica Walter	Alpine skiing	Liechtenstein
	Jacob Wester, Oscar Wester	Freestyle skiing	Sweden
	Curtis White, Emma White	Cycle sport	United States
	Jim Whitley, Jeff Whitley	Association football	United Kingdom (Northern Ireland)
	Tre Whyte, Kye Whyte	BMX racing	Great Britain (England)
Gary Wiggins	Bradley Wiggins	Cycle sport	Australia; Great Britain (England)
Bradley Wiggins	Ben Wiggins	Cycle sport	Great Britain (England)
Lee Wilkie	Jack Wilkie	Association football	United Kingdom (Scotland)
	Dominique Wilkins, Gerald Wilkins	Basketball	United States
Gerald Wilkins	Damien Wilkins	Basketball	United States
	Daniël Willemsen, Marcel Willemsen	Sidecarcross	Netherlands
Frank Williams	Claire Williams, Jonathan Williams	Auto sport	United Kingdom (England)
	Iñaki Williams, Nico Williams	Association football	Ghana; Spain
	Jodie Williams, Hannah Williams	Athletics	Great Britain (England)
J. J. Williams	Rhys Williams	Rugby union / Track and field	United Kingdom (Wales)
	Venus Williams, Serena Williams	Tennis	United States
Stuart Willmott (Jackie Willmott aunt)	Aimee Willmott, Chloe Willmott	Swimming	United Kingdom (England)
	Jahfarr Wilnis, Jason Wilnis	Kickboxing, Mixed martial arts	Netherlands
	Bryon Wilson, Bradley Wilson	Freestyle skiing	United States
Malcolm Wilson	Matthew Wilson	Rallying	United Kingdom (England)
	Markus Windisch, Dominik Windisch	Biathlon	Italy
Manfred Winkelhock	Markus Winkelhock	Auto racing	Germany
	Manfred Winkelhock, Joachim Winkelhock, Thomas Winkelhock	Auto racing	Germany
Kellen Winslow	Kellen Winslow II	American football	United States
	Juliane Wirtz, Florian Wirtz	Association football	Germany
	Peter Withe, Chris Withe	Association football	United Kingdom (England)
Peter Withe	Jason Withe	Association football	United Kingdom (England)
Herbert Wittmann	Marco Wittmann, Nico Wittmann	Auto sport	Germany
Agnesa Wlachovská	Vladimír Búřil, Peter Búřil	Figure skating / Ice hockey	Czech Republic; Slovakia
Alan Woan	Ian Woan	Association football	United Kingdom (England)
Gordon Wood	Keith Wood	Rugby union	Ireland
	Patrik Wozniacki, Caroline Wozniacki	Association football / Tennis	Denmark
Mats Wranå	Rasmus Wranå, Isabella Wranå	Curling	Sweden
	Paul Wright, Campbell Wright	Cycle sport, Biathlon	New Zealand; United States
Ian Wright	Shaun Wright-Phillips, Bradley Wright-Phillips	Association football	United Kingdom (England)
Shaun Wright-Phillips	D'Margio Wright-Phillips	Association football	United Kingdom (England); Grenada
Franz Wurz	Alexander Wurz	Motorsport	Austria
Alexander Wurz	Charlie Wurz, Oscar Wurz	Motorsport	Austria
	Taulant Xhaka, Granit Xhaka	Association football	Albania; Switzerland
	Kal Yafai, Gamal Yafai, Galal Yafai	Boxing	Great Britain (England)
	Adam Yates, Simon Yates	Cycle sport	United Kingdom (England)
	Kazuki Yazawa, Aki Yazawa	Canoe slalom	Japan
Andrey Yefimov	Yuliya Yefimova	Swimming	Russia
Yeo Hong-chul, Kim Chae-eun (formerly Kim Yoon-ji)	Yeo Seo-jeong	Artistic gymnastics	South Korea
	Elias Ymer, Mikael Ymer	Tennis	Sweden
	Clint Yorke, Dwight Yorke	Cricket, association football	Trinidad and Tobago
	Chinami Yoshida, Yurika Yoshida	Curling	Japan
	Sheila Young, Roger Young	Cycle sport, speed skating	United States
Nick Youngs	Tom Youngs, Ben Youngs	Rugby union	Great Britain (England)
	Phil Younghusband, James Younghusband	Association football	Philippines
	Carlos Yulo, Eldrew Yulo	Gymnastics	Philippines
Erik Zabel	Rick Zabel	Road bicycle racing	Germany
Hillar Zahkna	Rene Zahkna	Biathlon	Estonia
Zlatko Zahovič	Luka Zahović	Association football	Slovenia
	Ilnur Zakarin, Aydar Zakarin	Road bicycle racing	Russia
	Adam Žampa, Andreas Žampa	Alpine skiing	Slovakia
	Benjamín Zarandona, Iván Zarandona	Association football	Equatorial Guinea; Spain
	Mauro Zárate, Rolando Zárate, Sergio Zárate, Ariel Zárate	Association football	Argentina
Igor Zavozin, Elena Garanina (divorced)	Maxim Zavozin	Ice dancing	Soviet Union (Russian SFSR); Russia
Vyacheslav Zaytsev, Irina Pozdnyakova	Ivan Zaytsev	Volleyball / Swimming	Soviet Union (Russian SFSR); Italy; Russia
	Zé Elias, Rubinho	Association football	Brazil
Jo Zeller	Sandro Zeller	Motorsport	Switzerland
	Luke Zeller, Tyler Zeller, Cody Zeller	Basketball	United States
	Zico, Edu	Association football	Brazil
Zico	Junior	Association football	Brazil
Zinedine Zidane	Enzo Zidane, Luca Zidane, Théo Zidane, Elyaz Zidane	Association football	France; Spain; Algeria
	Nicky Zijlaard, Maikel Zijlaard	Cycle sport	Netherlands
Dimitar Zlatanov	Hristo Zlatanov	Volleyball	Bulgaria
	Ala Zoghlami, Osama Zoghlami	Running	Italy
Emil Zografski	Vladimir Zografski	Ski jumping	Bulgaria
Zizinho	Giovani dos Santos, Éder dos Santos, Jonathan dos Santos	Association football	Brazil; Mexico
	Haimar Zubeldia, Joseba Zubeldia	Road bicycle racing	Spain
Marina Zueva	Fedor Andreev	Ice dancing	Russia
	Pirmin Zurbriggen, Heidi Zurbriggen	Alpine skiing	Switzerland
Pirmin Zurbriggen	Elia Zurbriggen	Alpine skiing	Switzerland
Alexander Zverev Sr.	Mischa Zverev, Alexander Zverev Jr.	Tennis	Soviet Union (Russian SFSR); Germany
Charles Zwolsman Sr.	Charles Zwolsman Jr.	Motorsport	Netherlands
Iftikhar Ali Khan Pataudi	Mansoor Ali Khan Pataudi	Cricket	India
Roger Binny	Stuart Binny	Cricket	India
Yograj Singh	Yuvraj Singh	Cricket	India
Krishnamachari Srikkanth	Anirudha Srikkanth	Cricket	India
Ramanathan Krishnan	Ramesh Krishnan	Tennis	India
Milkha Singh	Jeev Milkha Singh	Athletics, Golf	India
Dhyan Chand	Ashok Kumar	Field hockey	India
Vece Paes	Leander Paes	Field hockey, Tennis	India
	Hardik Pandya, Krunal Pandya	Cricket	India
	Sara Hagström, Johanna Hagström	Orienteering, cross-country skiing	Sweden
Frank Gray (grandfather), Eddie Gray (great uncle), Andy Gray (father)	Archie Gray, Harry Gray	Association football	United Kingdom (Scotland); United Kingdom (England)
Jim Nildén (grandfather), David Nildén (father)	Matilda Nildén, Amanda Nildén, Charlie Nildén	Association football	Sweden

== Couples ==
1st party	2nd party	Sport	Country of origin
Chris Adcock	Gabby White	Badminton	United Kingdom (England)
Mohammed Al-Modiahki	Zhu Chen	Chess	Qatar; China
Maxim Afinogenov	Elena Dementieva	Ice hockey Tennis	Russia
Andre Agassi	Steffi Graf	Tennis	United States; Germany
Alvin Aguilar	Maybelline Masuda	Brazilian jiu-jitsu	Philippines
Marat Akbarov	Oksana Grishuk	Figure skating	Russia
Nick Aldis	Mickie James	Professional wrestling	United Kingdom (England); United States
Stephen Amritraj	Alison Riske	Tennis	United States
Vyacheslav Anisin	Irina Cherniaeva	Ice hockey Figure skating	Russia; Ukraine
Gillian Apps	Meghan Duggan	Ice hockey	Canada; United States
Lynsey Askew	Alex Blackwell	Cricket	United Kingdom (England); Australia
Magnus Bäckstedt	Megan Hughes	Cycle sport	Sweden; United Kingdom (Wales)
Marcos Baghdatis	Karolina Šprem	Tennis	Cyprus; Croatia
John Baldwin	Rena Inoue	Figure skating	United States
Daniil Barantsev	Jennifer Wester	Ice dancing	Russia; United States
Dean Barker	Mandy Smith	Sailing; Field hockey	New Zealand
Miroslav Barnyashev	C. J. Perry	Professional wrestling	Bulgaria; United States
Michael Barry	Dede Demet	Road bicycle racing	Canada; United States
Mario Bazán	Andrea Ferris	Track and field	Peru; Panama
Valon Behrami	Lara Gut	Association football Alpine skiing	Switzerland
Semyon Belits-Geiman	Natalia Dubova	Freestyle swimming Ice dancing	Russia
Greg Bennett	Laura Reback	Triathlon	Australia; United States
Chris Benoit	Nancy Toffoloni	Professional wrestling	Canada; United States
Tim Berrett	Tara Croxford	Race walking Field hockey	Canada
Mikkel Bjerg	Emma Norsgaard	Road bicycle racing	Denmark
Ole Einar Bjørndalen	Darya Domracheva	Biathlon; Cross-country skiing	Norway; Belarus
Ole Einar Bjørndalen	Nathalie Santer	Biathlon; Cross-country skiing	Norway; Italy; Belgium
Ken Blackman	Debrah Miceli	American football Professional wrestling	United States
Jan Blankers	Fanny Blankers-Koen	Track and field	Netherlands
David Blough	Melissa Gonzalez	American football Track and field	United States; Colombia
Julien Bontemps	Irina Konstantinova	Windsurfing	France; Bulgaria
Juan Carlos de Borbón	Sophia of Greece	Sailing	Spain; Greece
Valtteri Bottas	Emilia Pikkarainen	Auto racing Swimming	Finland
Ray Boyd	Denise Robert	Track and field	Australia
David Brabham	Lisa Thackwell	Motor racing	Australia; New Zealand
Matt Brammeier	Nikki Harris	Road bicycle racing	Ireland; United Kingdom (England)
Chris Brasher	Shirley Bloomer	Track and field Tennis	United Kingdom (England)
Robbie Brightwell	Ann Packer	Track and field	United Kingdom (England)
Ben Broeders	Femke Bol	Track and field	Belgium; Netherlands
Phililp Brooks	April Mendez	Mixed martial arts Professional wrestling	United States
Omar Brown	Veronica Campbell	Track and field	Jamaica
Travis Browne	Ronda Rousey	Mixed martial arts	United States
Rockne Brubaker	Stefania Berton	Figure skating	United States; Italy
Pierre Brunet	Andrée Joly	Figure skating	France
Katherine Brunt	Nat Sciver	Cricket	England
Tim Burke	Andrea Henkel	Biathlon	United States; Germany
Leroy Burrell	Michelle Finn	Track and field	United States
Yuri Butsayev	Viktoria Volchkova	Ice hockey Figure skating	Russia
Mark Calaway	Michelle McCool	Professional wrestling	United States
Pasquale Camerlengo	Anjelika Krylova	Figure skating	Italy; Russia
Matt Cardona	Chelsea Green	Professional wrestling	United States; Canada
Erik Carlsson	Pat Moss	Rallying	Sweden; United Kingdom (England)
Servando Carrasco	Alex Morgan	Association football	United States
John Cena	Nikki Bella	Professional wrestling	United States
Michael Chang	Amber Liu	Tennis	United States
Ilia Chernousov	Selina Gasparin	Cross-country skiing Biathlon	Russia; Switzerland
Andrés Chocho	Érica de Sena	Racewalking	Ecuador; Brazil
Julie Chu	Caroline Ouellette	Ice hockey	United States; Canada
Simone Collio	Ivet Lalova	Track and field	Italy; Bulgaria
Benjamin Compaoré	Ana Peleteiro	Track and field	France; Spain
Bart Conner	Nadia Comăneci	Artistic gymnastics	United States; Romania
Curtis Conway	Laila Ali	American football Boxing	United States
Alan Culpepper	Shayne Wille	Marathon; Track and field	United States
Casey Daigle	Jennie Finch	Baseball; Softball	United States
Bryan Danielson	Brianna Garcia-Colace	Professional wrestling	United States
Guy de Alwis	Rasanjali Silva	Cricket	Sri Lanka
Christopher Dean	Jill Trenary	Figure skating	United Kingdom (England); United States
Andre De Grasse	Nia Ali	Track and field	Canada; United States
Philip Deignan	Lizzie Armitstead	Track cycling and Road bicycle racing	Ireland; United Kingdom (England)
Jay DeMerit	Ashleigh McIvor	Association football Ski cross	United States; Canada
Rohan Dennis	Melissa Hoskins	Cycle sport	Australia
Phil Dent	Betty Ann Grubb Stuart	Tennis	Australia; United States
Taylor Dent	Jennifer Hopkins	Tennis	United States
Andrei Deputat	Ekaterina Bobrova	Figure skating	Russia
Jérémy Desplanches	Charlotte Bonnet	Swimming	Switzerland; France
Tom Dickson	Catarina Lindgren	Figure skating	United States; Sweden
Fabrizio Donato	Patrizia Spuri	Track and field	Italy
Dick Dreissigacker	Judy Geer	Rowing	United States
Alex Dupont	Ilana Duff	Para-sport	Canada
Geoffray Durbant	Anne-Cécile Ciofani	Association football Rugby	France
Andrew East	Shawn Johnson	American football Gymnastics	United States
Ashton Eaton	Brianne Theisen	Track and field	United States; Canada
Brady Ellison	Toja Černe	Archery	United States; Slovenia
Murilo Endres	Jaqueline Carvalho	Volleyball	Brazil
Yves Ehrlacher	Cathy Muller	Association football Motorsport	France
Kalev Ermits	Regina Oja	Biathlon	Estonia
Zach Ertz	Julie Johnston	American football Association football	United States
Neil Fachie	Lora Turnham	Para-sport	United Kingdom (Scotland); United Kingdom (England)
Jonathan Fatu	Trinity McCray	Professional wrestling	United States
Roger Federer	Miroslava Vavrinec	Tennis	Switzerland; Slovakia
A. J. Feeley	Heather Mitts	American football Association football	United States
Ray Ferraro	Cammi Granato	Ice hockey	Canada; United States
Sergey Fesikov	Anastasia Zuyeva	Swimming	Russia
Jess Fishlock	Tziarra King	Association football	United Kingdom(Wales); United States
Fabio Fognini	Flavia Pennetta	Tennis	Italy
David Ford	Kelly VanderBeek	Canoe slalom Alpine skiing	Canada
Richard Fox	Myriam Jerusalmi	Kayak slalom	United Kingdom (England); France
Patrick Frary	Julia Hamer	Professional wrestling	United Kingdom (England)
Don Fraser	Candace Jones	Figure skating	Canada
Bjorn Fratangelo	Madison Keys	Tennis	United States
Bruno Fratus	Michelle Lenhardt	Swimming; Bodybuilding	Brazil
Clayton Fredericks	Lucinda Murray	Eventing	Australia; Great Britain (England)
Roland Gäbler	Nahid Pachai	Sailing	Germany; Denmark
Fernando Gago	Gisela Dulko	Association football Tennis	Argentina
Edward Gal	Hans Peter Minderhoud	Dressage	Netherlands
Tony Gallopin	Marion Rousse	Road bicycle racing	France
Nomar Garciaparra	Mia Hamm	Baseball; Association football	United States
Lucy Garner	Lars van der Haar	Cycle sport	United Kingdom (England); Netherlands
Braden Gellenthien	Tanja Jensen	Archery	United States; Denmark
Riccardo De Gennaro	Stefanie Horn	Canoe slalom	Italy
Thomas Gilbert	Melissa Hyatt	Professional wrestling	United States
Thomas Gilbert	Debrah Miceli	Professional wrestling	United States
Egil Gjelland	Ann-Elen Skjelbreid	Biathlon	Norway
Sergei Gonchar	Ksenia Smetanenko	Ice hockey Ice dancing	Russia
Jody Gooding	Denise Johns	Beach volleyball	United Kingdom (England)
Rener Gracie	Eve Torres	Brazilian jiu-jitsu / Mixed martial arts Professional wrestling	Brazil; United States
Luke Greenbank	Anna Hopkin	Swimming	United Kingdom (England)
Ryan Gregson	Genevieve LaCaze	Track and field	Australia
Albert Grimaldi	Charlene Wittstock	Bobsleigh; Swimming	Monaco; South Africa
Sergei Grinkov	Ekaterina Gordeeva	Figure skating	Russia
Giovanni Guidetti	Bahar Toksoy	Volleyball	Italy; Turkey
Grzegorz Guzik	Krystyna Palka	Biathlon	Poland
Richard Hadlee	Karen Marsh	Cricket	New Zealand
Laird Hamilton	Gabrielle Reece	Surfing; Volleyball	United States
Gro Hammerseng	Anja Edin	Handball	Norway
Hao Haidong	Ye Zhaoying	Association football Badminton	China
Matt Hardy	Rebecca Reyes	Professional wrestling	United States
Mattias Hargin	Matilda Rapaport	Alpine skiing Freeskiing	Sweden
Kevin Harvick	DeLana Linville	Stock car racing	United States
Rob Hayles	Vicky Horner	Cycle sport Swimming	United Kingdom (England)
Bret Hedican	Kristi Yamaguchi	Ice hockey Figure skating	United States
Jayna Hefford	Kathleen Kauth	Ice hockey	Canada; United States
Wolfgang Heinig (in German)	Katrin Dörre (in German)	Running	East Germany
Adam Helcelet	Denisa Ščerbová	Athletics	Czech Republic
Greg Henderson	Katie Mactier	Cycle sport	New Zealand; Australia
John Hennigan	Kira Foster	Professional wrestling	United States; Canada
Ivan Hilgert	Marcela Košťálová	Canoe slalom	Czech Republic
Luboš Hilgert	Štěpánka Prošková	Canoe slalom	Czech Republic
Bernhard Hochwald	Katja Klepp	Shooting	East Germany; Germany
Jrue Holiday	Lauren Cheney	Basketball; Association football	United States
Bill Hooker	Erica Nixon	Track and field	Australia
Steve Hooker	Yekaterina Kostetskaya	Track and field	Australia; Russia
Ondřej Hotárek	Anna Cappellini	Figure skating	Czech Republic; Italy
Robert Booker Huffman	Sharmell Sullivan	Professional wrestling	United States
Reto Hug	Nicola Spirig	Triathlon	Switzerland
Dan Hugo	Flora Duffy	Triathlon	South Africa; Bermuda
Gianni Iapichino	Fiona May	Sport of athletics	Italy; Great Britain (England)
Uladzimir Ignatik	Alexandra Cadanțu	Tennis	Belarus; Romania
Joe Ingles	Renae Hallinan	Basketball; Netball	Australia
John James Jackson	Paula Walker	Bobsleigh	Great Britain (England)
Tomáš Janků	Kateřina Baďurová	Track and field	Czech Republic
Robert Jaworski Jr.	Mikaela Cojuangco	Basketball; Equestrian	Philippines
Hayes Alan Jenkins	Carol Heiss	Figure skating	United States
Casey Jennings	Kerri Walsh	Beach volleyball	United States
Roland Jentsch	Christiane Scheibel	Curling	Germany
Joachim Johansson	Johanna Westerberg	Tennis; Golf	Sweden
Glory Johnson	Brittney Griner	Basketball	United States
Al Joyner	Florence Griffith	Track and field	United States
Luis Juncos	Valentina Aracil	Swimming	Argentina
Gennadi Karponosov	Natalia Linichuk	Figure skating	Russia
Oleksiy Kasyanov	Hanna Melnychenko	Track and field	Ukraine
Shannon Kelley	Mary Lou Retton	American football Gymnastics	United States
Jason Kenny	Laura Trott	Track cycling	United Kingdom (England)
Bob Kersee	Jackie Joyner	Track and field	United States
Safwan Khalil	Carmen Marton	Taekwondo	Australia
Kirill Khaliavin	Ksenia Monko	Ice dancing	Russia
Richard Kilty	Dovilė Dzindzaletaitė	Track and field	United Kingdom (England); Lithuania
Sascha Kindred	Nyree Lewis	Swimming	United Kingdom (Wales)
David King	Stacey Kemp	Figure skating	United Kingdom (England)
Patrik Klüft	Carolina Klüft	Pole vaulting Track and field	Sweden
Servais Knaven	Natascha den Ouden	Cycle sport	Netherlands
Chris Knierim	Alexa Scimeca Knierim	Figure skating	United States
Mark Knoll	Tonny de Jong	Speed skating	Canada; Netherlands
Jernej Koblar	Andreja Grašič	Alpine skiing Biathlon	Slovenia
Valery Konovalov (in Lithuanian)	Laima Zilporytė	Cycle sport	Ukraine; Lithuania
Wesley Koolhof	Julia Görges	Tennis	Netherlands; Germany
Petr Korda	Regina Rajchrtová	Tennis	Czechoslovakia; Czech Republic
Roman Kostomarov	Oksana Domnina	Ice dancing	Russia
Petr Koukal	Gabriela Soukalová	Badminton; Biathlon	Czech Republic
Michael Krumm	Kimiko Date	Auto sport Tennis	Germany; Japan
Alexander Krushelnitskiy	Anastasia Bryzgalova	Curling	Russia
Viktor Kudriavtsev	Marina Titova	Figure skating	Russia
Mikhail Kulagin	Yana Sizikova	Basketball; Tennis	Russia
Luke Kunin	Sophia Shaver	Ice hockey	United States
Brooks Laich	Katrín Davíðsdóttir	Ice hockey CrossFit	Canada; Iceland
Brent Laing	Jennifer Jones	Curling	Canada
Brent Lakatos	Stefanie Reid	Para-sport	Canada; United Kingdom (Scotland)
Betnijah Laney	Jordan Hamilton	Basketball	United States
Vinicius Lanza	Annie Lazor	Swimming	Brazil; United States
Tom Laughlin	Trisa Hayes	Professional wrestling	United States
Patrice Lauzon	Marie-France Dubreuil	Ice dancing	Canada
Vuk Lazović	Barbara Varlec	Handball	Montenegro; Slovenia
Romain Le Gac	Marie-Jade Lauriault	Figure skating	France
Kévin Le Roux	Cursty Jackson	Volleyball	France; United States
Lee Chong Wei	Wong Mew Choo	Badminton	Malaysia
David Lee	Caroline Wozniacki	Basketball; Tennis	United States; Denmark
Dezső Lemhényi	Olga Tass	Water polo Gymnastics	Hungary
Brock Lesnar	Rena Greek	Mixed martial arts Professional wrestling	United States
Allar Levandi	Anna Kondrashova	Nordic combined Figure skating	Estonia; Russia
Paul Levesque	Stephanie McMahon	Professional wrestling	United States
Ricky Lewis	Leslie Osborne	Association football	United States
Lin Dan	Xie Xingfang	Badminton	China
Lin Zhigang	Deng Yaping	Table tennis	China
Valeri Liukin	Anna Kotchneva	Artistic gymnastics Rhythmic gymnastics	Kazakhstan; Russia
Anthony Lobello Jr.	Arianna Fontana	Short track speed skating	United States; Italy
Colby Lopez	Rebecca Quin	Professional wrestling	United States; Ireland
Gary Lough	Paula Radcliffe	Track and field	United Kingdom (England)
Igor Lukanin	Kristin Fraser	Ice dancing	Azerbaijan; United States
Andrei Lutai	Ina Demireva	Figure skating	Russia; Bulgaria
Brian Lynch	Kim Clijsters	Basketball; Tennis	United States; Belgium
Liliane Maestrini	Larissa França	Beach volleyball	Brazil
Tyler Magner	Alexis Ryan	Road bicycle racing	United States
Peter Maivia	Ofelia Fuataga	Professional Wrestling	Samoa
Oleg Makarov	Larisa Selezneva	Figure skating	Russia
Shoaib Malik	Sania Mirza	Cricket / Tennis	Pakistan; India
Xavier Marchand	Céline Bonnet	Swimming	France
Bruno Marcotte	Meagan Duhamel	Figure skating	Canada
Dan Martin	Jess Andrews	Cycle sport / Track and field	Ireland; United Kingdom (England)
Tony Martin	Anastasia Dobromyslova	Darts	United Kingdom (England); Russia
Richie McCaw	Gemma Flynn	Rugby union Field hockey	New Zealand
Peter McColgan	Liz Lynch	Long-distance running	Great Britain (Northern Ireland); Great Britain (Scotland)
Mike McEwen	Dawn McEwen	Curling	Canada
Terry Meek	Cheryl Bernard	Curling	Canada
Dominik Meichtry	Jessica Hardy	Swimming	Switzerland; United States
Paul Meier	Heike Henkel	Sport of athletics	Germany
Axel Merckx	Lotte Kopecky	Cycle sport	Belgium
Per Mertesacker	Ulrike Stange	Association football Handball	Germany
Borislav Mihaylov	Maria Petrova	Association football Rhythmic gymnastics	Bulgaria
Bode Miller	Morgan Beck	Alpine skiing Beach volleyball	United States
Kentaro Minagawa	Aiko Uemura	Skiing	Japan
Łukasz Michalski	Anna Jagaciak	Track and field	Poland
Alexei Mishin	Tatiana Oleneva	Figure skating	Russia
Mike Mizanin	Maryse Ouellet	Professional wrestling	United States; Canada
Tommy Moe	Megan Gerety	Alpine skiing	United States
Gaël Monfils	Elina Svitolina	Tennis	France; Ukraine
Nikolai Morozov	Vasilisa Davankova	Figure skating	Russia
Jacopo Mosca	Elisa Longo Borghini	Cycle sport	Italy
Igor Moskvin	Tamara Bratus	Figure skating	Russia
Moses Mosop	Florence Kiplagat	Long-distance running	Kenya
Carl Myerscough	Melissa Price	Track and field	United Kingdom (England); United States
Felix Neureuther	Miriam Gössner	Alpine skiing Biathlon, cross-country skiing	Germany
Nguyễn Ngọc Trường Sơn	Phạm Lê Thảo Nguyên	Chess	Vietnam
Nguyễn Tiến Minh	Vũ Thị Trang	Badminton	Vietnam
Ville Nousiainen	Mona-Liisa Malvalehto	Cross-country skiing	Finland
John Nuttall	Liz McColgan	Track and field and Road running	United Kingdom (England); United Kingdom (Scotland)
John Nuttall	Alison Wyeth	Running	United Kingdom (England)
Helmut Oblinger	Violetta Peters	Canoe slalom	Austria; Germany
Jim Ochowicz	Sheila Young	Cycle sport, speed skating	United States
Josef Odložil	Věra Čáslavská	Track and field Gymnastics	Czechoslovakia
Jaap Oudkerk	Marianne Heemskerk	Track cycling Swimming	Netherlands
Peter Oppegard	Karen Kwan	Figure skating	United States
Logan Owen	Chloé Dygert	Cycle sport	United States
Madison Packer	Anya Battaglino	Ice Hockey	United States
Gregorio Paltrinieri	Rossella Fiamingo	Swimming; Fencing	Italy
Pang Wei	Du Li	Shooting	China
Candace Parker	Anna Petrakova	Basketball	United States; Russia
Steve Paulding	Julie Forrester	Track cycling	United Kingdom (Wales); United Kingdom (England)
Zdeněk Pazdírek	Karena Richardson	Figure skating	Czech Republic; United Kingdom (England)
David Pelletier	Jamie Salé	Figure skating	Canada
Luis Amaranto Perea	Digna Luz Murillo	Association football Track and field	Colombia; Spain
Shane Perkins	Kristine Bayley	Track cycling	Russia; Australia
Stratos Perperoglou	Erin Buescher	Basketball	Greece; United States
Franck Perrot	Tone Marit Oftedal	Biathlon	France; Norway
Denis Petrov	Chen Lu	Figure skating	Russia; China
Davis Phinney	Connie Carpenter-Phinney	Road cycle sport	United States
Taylor Phinney	Katarzyna Niewiadoma	Road cycle sport	United States; Poland
Sjaak Pieters	Ans Dekker	Cycle sport, Artistic gymnastics	Netherlands
Raphaël Poirée	Liv Grete Skjelbreid	Biathlon	France; Norway
Sergei Ponomarenko	Marina Klimova	Ice dancing	Russia
Hugh Porter	Anita Lonsbrough	Cycle sport Swimming	United Kingdom (England)
Jeff Porter	Tiffany Ofili	Track and field	United States; United Kingdom (England)
Christian Poser	Jamie Greubel	Bobsleigh	Germany; United States
Marie-Philip Poulin	Laura Stacey	Ice hockey	Canada
Roger Prideaux	Ruth Westbrook	Cricket	United Kingdom (England)
Allie Quigley	Courtney Vandersloot	Basketball	United States / Hungary
Graham Rahal	Courtney Force	Auto racing	United States
Benjamin Raich	Marlies Schild	Alpine skiing	Austria
Juan Miguel Rando	Lidón Muñoz	Swimming	Spain
Megan Rapinoe	Sue Bird	Association football Basketball	United States
Steve Redgrave	Anne Callaway	Rowing	United Kingdom (England)
Matthew Rehwoldt	Shaul Guerrero	Professional wrestling	United States
Claudio Reyna	Danielle Egan	Association football	United States
Matt Richards	Emily Large	Swimming	United Kingdom (Wales); United Kingdom (England)
Nick Rimando	Jacqui Little	Association football	United States
Lukáš Rosol	Denisa Ščerbová	Tennis; Track and field	Czech Republic
Aaron Ross	Sanya Richards	American football Track and field	United States
Tom Rouen	Amy Van Dyken	American football Swimming	United States
Ludovic Roux	Isabelle Delobel	Nordic combined / Ice dancing	France
Matthew Rowe	Dani King	Racing cyclists	United Kingdom (Wales)
Danylo Sapunov	Yuliya Yelistratova	Triathlon	Ukraine
Kensuke Sasaki	Hisako Uno	Professional wrestling	Japan
Nobuo Satō	Kumiko Okawa	Figure skating	Japan
Jan Šátral	Denisa Allertová	Tennis	Czech Republic
Luke Saville	Daria Gavrilova	Tennis	Australia; Russia
Elton Sawyer	Patty Moise	Auto racing	United States
Robert Scheidt	Gintarė Volungevičiūtė	Sailing	Brazil; Lithuania
Michael Schumacher	Corinna Betsch	Auto racing Equestrianism	Germany
Benoît Schwarz	Martina van Berkel	Curling, Swimming	Switzerland
Bastian Schweinsteiger	Ana Ivanovic	Association football Tennis	Germany; Serbia
Sean Scott	Rachel Wacholder	Beach volleyball	United States
Tim Seaman	Rachel Lavallée	Racewalking	United States; Canada
Roman Serov	Anna Zadorozhniuk	Figure skating	Russia; Ukraine
Shang Yi	Wu Na	Association football Table tennis	China
Denis Shapovalov	Mirjam Björklund	Tennis	Canada; Sweden
Ishant Sharma	Pratima Singh	Cricket / Basketball	India
Alexander Shevchenko	Anastasia Potapova	Tennis	Russia; Kazakhstan
Matthew Short	Madison Wilson	Cricket; Swimming	Australia
Sileshi Sihine	Tirunesh Dibaba	Track and field	Ethiopia
Georgia Simmerling	Stephanie Labbé	Track cycling, Association football	Canada
Cody Simpson	Emma McKeon	Swimming	Australia
Craig Simpson	Jamie Salé	Ice hockey Figure skating	Canada
Steffen Skel	Diane Sartor	Skeleton; Luge	Germany
Anatoli Šmigun	Rutt Rehemaa	Cross-country skiing	Soviet Union (Estonian SSR)
Pablo Solares	Shannon Rowbury	Track and field	Mexico; United States
Petter Solberg	Pernilla Walfridsson	Rallying	Norway; Sweden
Gary Staines	Linda Keough	Track and field	United Kingdom; England
Mitchell Starc	Alyssa Healy	Cricket	Australia
Maciej Staręga	Monika Hojnisz	Cross-country skiing Biathlon	Poland
Jerramy Stevens	Hope Solo	American football Association football	United States
Colin Stewart	Julie Fleeting	Association football	United Kingdom (Scotland)
Mark Stockwell	Tracy Caulkins	Swimming	Australia; United States
Barney Storey	Sarah Bailey	Paralympic swimming, cycle sport	United Kingdom
Rick Suhr	Jennifer Stuczynski	Track and field	United States
Gunde Svan	Marie Johansson	Cross-country skiing	Sweden
Petr Svoboda	Jiřina Ptáčníková	Track and field	Czech Republic
Mikito Tachizaki	Fuyuko Suzuki	Biathlon	Japan
Bahri Tanrıkulu	Tina Morgan	Taekwondo	Turkey; Australia
Diana Taurasi	Penny Taylor	Basketball	United States; Australia
Teng Haibin	Zhang Nan	Gymnastics	China
Obadele Thompson	Marion Jones	Track and field	Barbados; United States
Mike Tindall	Zara Phillips	Rugby union Equestrianism	United Kingdom (England)
Matt To'omua	Ellyse Perry	Rugby union, cricket, association football	Australia
Maxim Trankov	Tatiana Volosozhar	Figure skating	Russia
Matt Treanor	Misty May	Baseball; Beach volleyball	United States
Luke Trickett	Libby Lenton	Swimming	Australia
Yauhen Tsurkin	Aliaksandra Herasimenia	Swimming	Belarus
Ian Tullett	Hayley Parry	Track and field	Great Britain (England); Great Britain (Wales)
Shane Tusup (in Hungarian)	Katinka Hosszú	Swimming	United States; Hungary
Mitar Tzourits	Martina Guiggi	Volleyball	Greece; Italy
Maicel Uibo	Shaunae Miller	Track and field	Estonia; Bahamas
Anissa Urtez	Amanda Chidester	Softball	Mexico; United States
Jean-Claude Van Damme	Gladys Portugues	Karate; Kickboxing; Bodybuilding	Belgium; United States
Rafael van der Vaart	Estavana Polman	Association football Handball	Netherlands
Jean-Paul van Poppel	Leontine van der Lienden	Cycle sport	Netherlands
Jos Verstappen	Sophie Kumpen	Motor sport	Netherlands; Belgium
Martin Vestby (in Swedish)	Emma Johansson	Cycle sport	Norway; Sweden
Ty Vickery	Arina Rodionova	Australian rules football Tennis	Australia
Thomas Vonn	Lindsey Kildow	Alpine skiing	United States
Kate Walsh	Helen Richardson	Field hockey	United Kingdom (England)
J. J. Watt	Kealia Ohai	American football Association football	United States
Ferry Weertman	Ranomi Kromowidjojo	Swimming	Netherlands
Gert Weil	Ximena Restrepo	Track and field	Chile; Colombia
Harti Weirather	Hanni Wenzel	Alpine skiing	Austria; Liechtenstein
Cory Weston	Sara Lee	Professional wrestling	United States
Charlie White	Tanith Belbin	Ice dancing	United States; Canada
Vic Wild	Alena Zavarzina	Snowboarding	Russia
Jon Wilkin	Francesca Halsall	Rugby league / Swimming	United Kingdom (England)
Jeff Wilson	Adine Harper	Rugby union and Cricket / Netball	New Zealand
Theodore Wilson	Natalie Neidhart	Professional wrestling	Canada
Dean Winstanley	Lorraine Farlam	Darts	United Kingdom (England)
Kris Wirtz	Kristy Sargeant	Figure skating	Canada
Toto Wolff	Susie Stoddart	Auto racing	Austria; United Kingdom (Scotland)
Hunter Woodhall	Tara Davis	Para-athletics, Track and field	United States
Marta Xargay	Breanna Stewart	Basketball	Spain; United States
Yao Ming	Ye Li	Basketball	China
Roger Young	Connie Paraskevin	Cycle sport, speed skating	United States)
Emil Zátopek	Dana Ingrová	Track and field	Czechoslovakia
Zhao Hongbo	Shen Xue	Figure skating	China
Attila Zsivoczky	Györgyi Farkas	Track and field	Hungary
William Poromaa	Frida Karlsson	Cross-country skiing	Sweden
Gustav Berglund	Ebba Andersson	Cross-country skiing	Sweden
Johan Häggström	Linn Svahn	Cross-country skiing	Sweden
JC Schoonmaker	Emma Ribom	Cross-country skiing	United States; Sweden
Kevin Bolger	Maja Dahlqvist	Cross-country skiing	United States; Sweden
Vebjørn Moen	Johanna Hagström	Cross-country skiing	Norway; Sweden
Martin Ponsiluoma	Hanna Öberg	Biathlon	Sweden
Jesper Nelin	Hanna Öberg	Biathlon	Sweden
Peppe Femling	Anna Magnusson	Biathlon	Sweden
David Ekholm	Helena Jonsson	Biathlon	Sweden

== See also ==
- List of family relations in American football
  - List of second-generation National Football League players
- List of association football (soccer) families
  - List of African association football families
  - List of European association football families
    - List of English association football families
    - List of former Yugoslavia association football families
    - List of Scottish football families
    - List of Spanish association football families
  - Category:Association football families
- List of Australian rules football families
- List of second-generation Major League Baseball players
- List of second-generation National Basketball Association players
- List of boxing families
- List of chess families
- List of tennis families
- List of International cricket families
- List of family relations in the National Hockey League
- List of family relations in rugby league
- List of international rugby union families
- List of professional wrestling families
