= Scott Hairston =

Mexican American baseball player (born 1980)

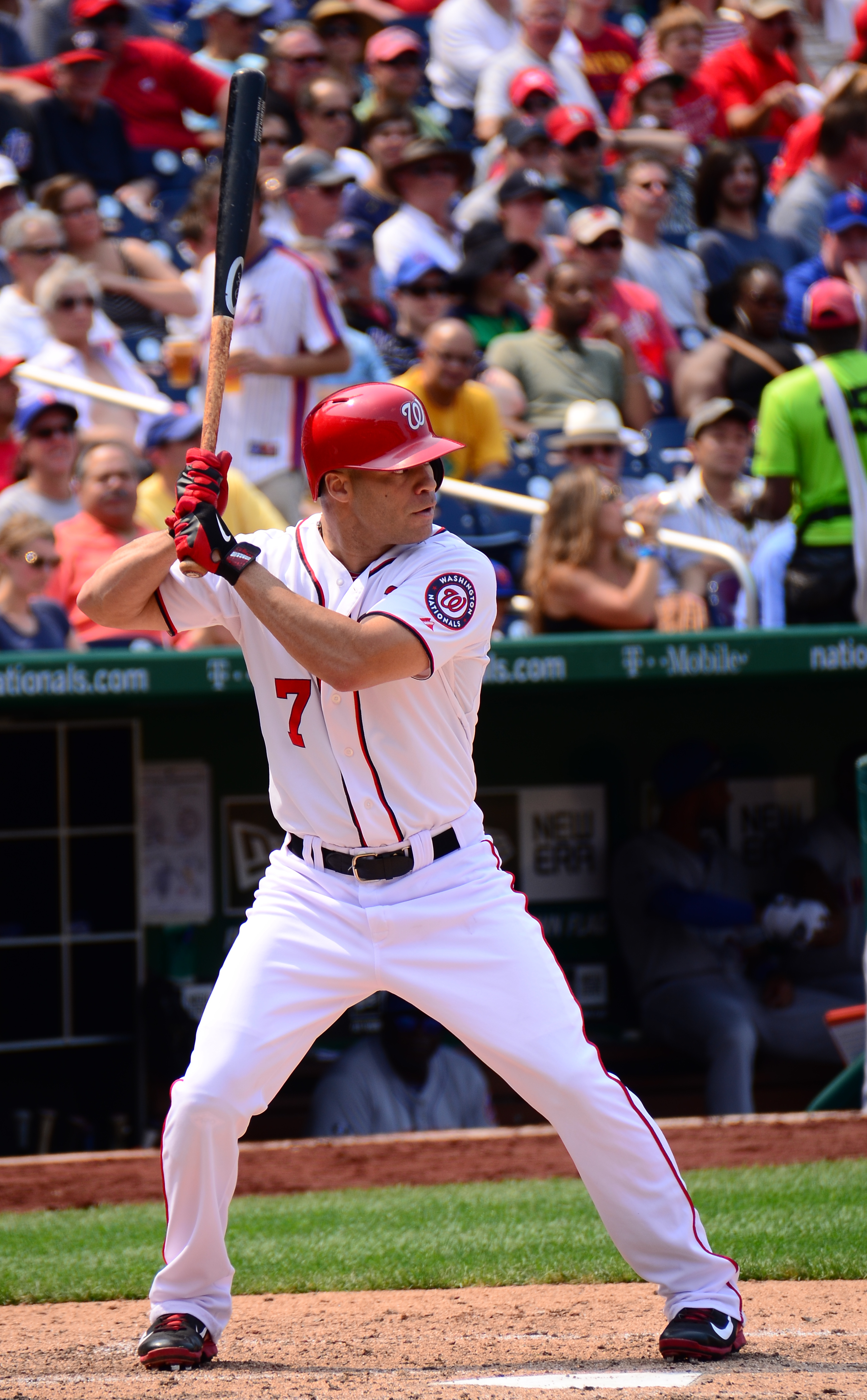
- Hairston with the Washington Nationals in 2014
- Outfielder
- Born: May 25, 1980 (age 46); Fort Worth, Texas, U.S.
- Batted: Right Threw: Right

MLB debut
- May 7, 2004, for the Arizona Diamondbacks

Last MLB appearance
- September 28, 2014, for the Washington Nationals

MLB statistics
- Batting average: .242
- Home runs: 106
- Runs batted in: 313
- Stats at Baseball Reference

Teams
- Arizona Diamondbacks (2004–2007); San Diego Padres (2007–2009); Oakland Athletics (2009); San Diego Padres (2010); New York Mets (2011–2012); Chicago Cubs (2013); Washington Nationals (2013–2014)

Scott Alexander Hairston (born May 25, 1980) is a Mexican-American former professional baseball left fielder. He played in Major League Baseball (MLB) for the Arizona Diamondbacks, San Diego Padres, Oakland Athletics, New York Mets, Chicago Cubs, and Washington Nationals. He bats and throws right-handed.

Hairston comes from a noted baseball family, with his grandfather, Sam Hairston, father, Jerry Hairston, Sr., and his brother, Jerry Hairston Jr. having been Major League players.

== Early life ==
Hairston attended Canyon del Oro High School in the Tucson suburb of Oro Valley, Arizona and was a letterman in baseball. While there, he was a teammate of former second baseman Ian Kinsler.

== College career ==
He played college baseball at Central Arizona College alongside future major leaguer Ian Kinsler.

== Professional career ==
=== Arizona Diamondbacks ===
Hairston was drafted by the Arizona Diamondbacks in the third round of the 2001 MLB draft. He started at second base for part of his rookie season of 2004, but played mostly a reserve role since then. On July 27, 2007, the Diamondbacks traded him to the San Diego Padres for Leo Rosales.

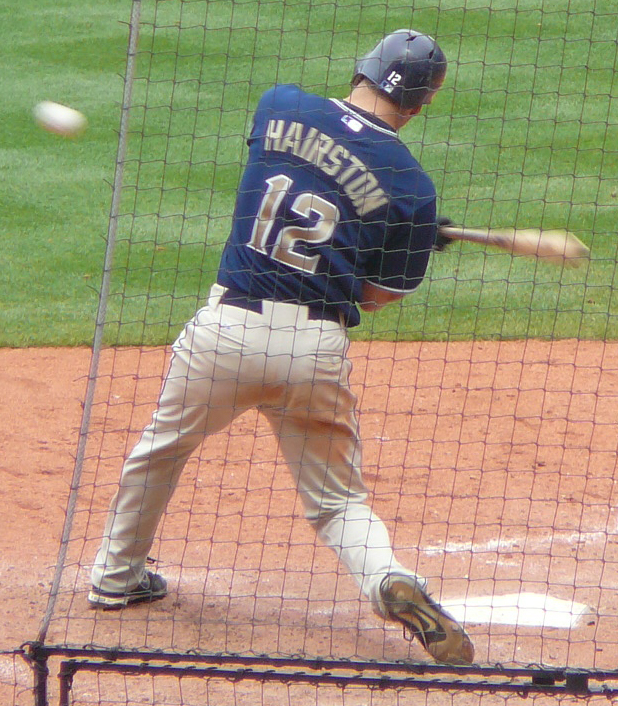
Hairston with the San Diego Padres in 2008

=== San Diego Padres (first stint) ===
During his first game as a San Diego Padres starter (August 3, 2007), Hairston hit two consecutive home runs. The first was a three-run blast in the eighth inning that pushed the game against the Giants into extra innings, and the second was a walk-off blast in the 10th inning. Hairston was placed into the game to substitute for Milton Bradley. The following day in his first at-bat, Hairston hit another home run, making it three home runs in three consecutive at-bats (just the seventh Padre to homer in three straight at-bats). The first game was also the game in which Barry Bonds hit his 755th home run to tie the all-time record previously held by Hank Aaron.

Hairston became a fan favorite in San Diego, well known for his clutch home runs and late-inning heroics. He hit three walk-off home runs for the Padres, in addition to other walk-off hits. From 2007 to 2009, he hit 12 home runs in late and clutch situations. These are classified as at-bats in the 7th or later with the batting team tied, ahead by one, or the tying run at least on deck. He was particularly tough against the Giants, with 11 of his 58 career homers coming off San Francisco, as well as 23 RBI, by far the most against any team he's faced.

Hairston hit a home run to break a 6–6 tie in the top of the 13th inning against the Colorado Rockies in the 2007 Wild Card tie-breaker game. The Rockies won the game in the bottom half of that inning.

Hairston represented Mexico at the 2009 World Baseball Classic alongside his brother Jerry. Hairston's mother was born in Mexico, making him eligible to play for the Mexican team.

=== Oakland Athletics ===
On July 5, 2009, Hairston was traded to the Oakland Athletics for Sean Gallagher and minor leaguers Ryan Webb and Craig Italiano.

=== San Diego Padres (second stint) ===
On January 16, 2010, Hairston was traded back to the Padres, along with outfielder Aaron Cunningham in exchange for third baseman Kevin Kouzmanoff and minor leaguer Eric Sogard.

=== New York Mets ===
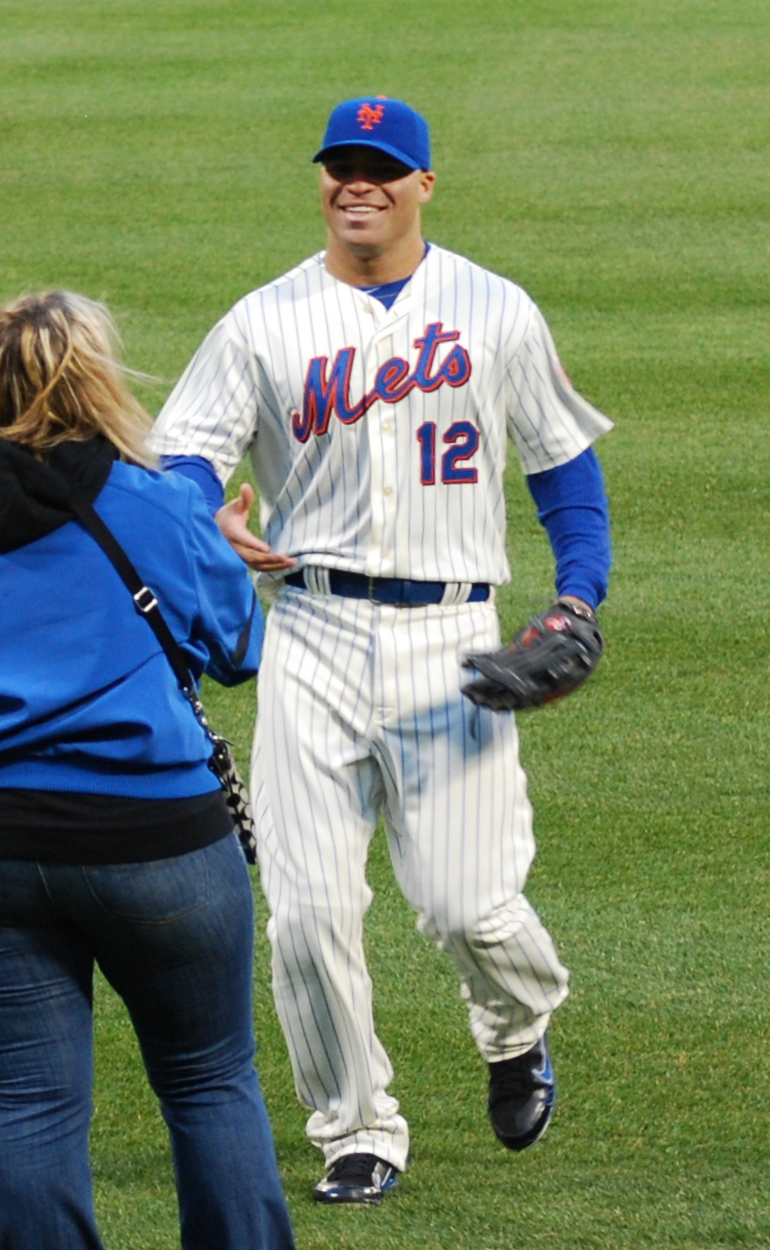
Hairston with the New York Mets in 2011

On January 20, 2011, Hairston signed a one-year contract with the New York Mets. He resigned with the Mets on January 5, 2012, to a one-year contract worth $1.1 million. On April 27 in Colorado, Hairston became the 10th Met in history to hit for the cycle.

On October 3, 2012, Hairston hit his 20th home run (a personal first) of the season off Tom Koehler in the Mets regular season finale against the Miami Marlins.

=== Chicago Cubs ===
Hairston became a free agent following the 2012 season. He agreed to a two-year, $5 million contract with the Chicago Cubs in January 2013 with up to $1 million in performance bonuses. The contract became official on February 10, 2013. He began the year in a platoon in right field with Nate Schierholtz and was used as a pinch-hitter when he didn't start. He went 3–31 with two home runs in April, 8–31 with two home runs in May, and 6–31 in June and the beginning of July with four home runs before being traded.

=== Washington Nationals ===
On July 7, 2013, Hairston was traded to the Washington Nationals for minor league pitcher Ivan Pineyro. Used mostly off the bench in 2013 with Washington, he did start in left field against most left-handed starters, spelling Bryce Harper or Denard Span. He finished July going 2–17 with no home runs, went 6–23 with one home run in August, and went 5–18 with one home run in September. In 85 games combined in 2013, he hit .191 with 10 home runs and 26 RBI in 157 at bats.

=== Chicago White Sox ===
On November 18, 2015, Hairston signed a minor league contract with the Chicago White Sox organization. He was released prior to the start of the season on March 31, 2016.

== Family ==
Hairston comes from the biggest Major League Baseball family. He is the brother of Jerry Hairston Jr., the son of Jerry Hairston Sr., the nephew of Johnny Hairston, and the grandson of Sammy Hairston, a former Negro leaguer who later became the first African American player in Chicago White Sox history. The five Hairstons who have played in the majors set a record; in addition, Sam Hairston, Jr spent a year in the minors as part of the Chicago White Sox organization; Johnny Hairston had three sons, Johnny Jr Jeff and Jason who had brief minor league careers. Two other three-generation MLB families have four members each: the Boone family (Ray, Bob, Bret and Aaron) and the Bell family (Gus, Buddy, David, and Mike). Hairston is of Mexican descent on his mother's side. He and his wife, Jill, and sons, Landon and Dallas, reside in Gilbert, Arizona. Landon plays college baseball at Arizona State.

== See also ==
- Third-generation Major League Baseball families
- List of Major League Baseball players to hit for the cycle

Achievements
Preceded by Pablo Sandoval	Hitting for the cycle April 27, 2012	Succeeded by Aaron Hill
