= Sam Hairston =

American baseball player (1920–1997)

- Catcher
- Born: January 20, 1920; Crawford, Mississippi, U.S.
- Died: October 31, 1997 (aged 77); Birmingham, Alabama, U.S.
- Batted: Left Threw: Right

Professional debut
- NgL: 1944, for the Birmingham Black Barons
- MLB: July 21, 1951, for the Chicago White Sox

Last MLB appearance
- August 26, 1951, for the Chicago White Sox

MLB (Note: On December 16, 2020, Major League Baseball declared the Negro leagues, from the span of 1920–1948, to be a "Major League". Hairston's statistics reflect his time in the Negro leagues from 1944–1948.) statistics
- Batting average: .313
- Home runs: 5
- Runs batted in: 63
- Stats at Baseball Reference

Teams
- Negro leagues: Birmingham Black Barons (1944); Cincinnati / Indianapolis Clowns (1945–1950); Major League Baseball: Chicago White Sox (1951)

Career highlights and awards
- NgL All-Star (1948)

Samuel Harding Hairston (January 20, 1920 – October 31, 1997) was an American Negro league baseball and Major League Baseball player. He played for the Birmingham Black Barons and the Indianapolis Clowns of the Negro leagues and played part of one season with the Chicago White Sox as a catcher. He is buried in Birmingham's Elmwood Cemetery.

== Family ==
Hairston comes from the biggest major league baseball family, as the father of MLB players Jerry Hairston, Sr. and Johnny Hairston, and the grandfather of Jerry Hairston Jr. and Scott Hairston. A son, Sammy Hairston Jr., and three grandsons, Johnny Hairston Jr., Jeff Hairston and Jason Hairston played in the minor leagues. The five Hairstons who have played in the majors are tied for the most ever with the Delahanty brothers. Two of the three other three-generation MLB families have four members each: the Boone family (Ray, Bob, Bret and Aaron) and the Bell family (Gus, Buddy, David, and Mike). The Colemans are the other three generation MLB family (Joe, Joe, and Casey).

== See also ==
- Third-generation Major League Baseball families

== See also ==
- List of Negro league baseball players who played in Major League Baseball
