= Johnny Hairston =

American baseball player (born 1944)

- Catcher
- Born: August 27, 1944 (age 82); Birmingham, Alabama, U.S.
- Batted: Right Threw: Right

MLB debut
- September 6, 1969, for the Chicago Cubs

Last MLB appearance
- October 2, 1969, for the Chicago Cubs

MLB statistics
- Batting average: .250
- Hits: 1
- Home runs: 0
- Runs batted in: 0
- Stats at Baseball Reference

Teams
- Chicago Cubs (1969)

John Louis Hairston (born August 27, 1944) is an American former catcher and left fielder in Major League Baseball who played for the Chicago Cubs in the 1969 season. Hairston batted and threw right-handed. He debuted on September 6, 1969, and played his final major league game on October 2, 1969.

Hairston posted a .250 batting average (1-for-4) in three games played.

== Family ==
Hairston comes from the biggest major league baseball family. He is the son of Sammy Hairston, a former Negro leaguer who later became the first black player in Chicago White Sox history; the brother of Jerry Hairston, Sr., and the uncle of Jerry Hairston Jr. and Scott Hairston. The five Hairstons that have played in the majors set a record. The two other three-generation MLB families have four members each: the Boone family (Ray, Bob, Bret and Aaron) and the Bell family (Gus, Buddy, David, and Mike). Johnny Hairston was the first second-generation African American player in Major League Baseball.

== See also ==
- List of second-generation Major League Baseball players
