= Jerry Hairston =

Jerry Hairston may refer to

- Jerry Hairston Sr. (born 1952), retired Major League Baseball player
- Jerry Hairston Jr. (born 1976), former Major League Baseball player
