= List of second-generation Major League Baseball players =

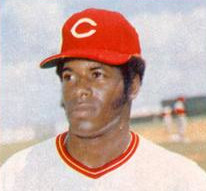
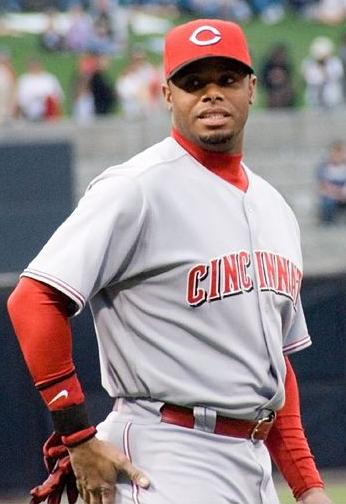
Ken Griffey Sr. (left) and Ken Griffey Jr. were teammates on the Seattle Mariners in 1990.

Dozens of father-and-son combinations have played or managed in Major League Baseball (MLB).

The first was Jack Doscher, son of Herm Doscher, who made his debut in 1903.

Ken Griffey Sr. and Ken Griffey Jr. became the first father-and-son duo to play in MLB at the same time, in 1989 when Ken Jr. was called up by the Seattle Mariners while Ken Sr. was playing with the Cincinnati Reds. They became Mariner teammates in 1990. In Ken Sr.'s first game as a Mariner, on August 31, 1990, the pair hit back-to-back singles in the first inning and both scored. On September 14, in the top of the first off California Angels pitcher Kirk McCaskill, the pair hit back-to-back home runs, the only father-son duo to do so. They played 51 games together before Ken Sr. retired in June 1991.

In 2001, Tim Raines and Tim Raines Jr. played as teammates with the Baltimore Orioles.

At the 2023 Home Run Derby, Vladimir Guerrero Jr. and Vladimir Guerrero Sr. became the first father-son duo to win the trophy.

Cecil and Prince Fielder are the only father-son combination each to hit 50 or more home runs in any season. Cecil Fielder hit 51 homers in 1990; 17 years later, his son Prince, hit 50. Both Prince and Cecil hit exactly 319 home runs in their careers.

Seven families have had a father and son serve as managers:

- the Macks: (Connie and Earle)
- the Sislers: (George and Dick)
- the Skinners: (Bob and Joel)
- the Boones: (Bob and Aaron)
- the Bells: (Buddy and David).
- the Rojas-Alous: Felipe Alou and Luis Rojas
- the Tracys: (Jim and Chad)

== Third-generation families ==
In 1992, Bret Boone became the first third-generation MLB player.

There are seven third-generation MLB-player families:

- The Bells (Gus, Buddy, David, Mike)
- The Boones (Ray, Bob, Bret, Aaron)
- The Colemans (Joe, Joe Jr., Casey) - The Colemans are the only third-generation family of pitchers.
- The Cruzes (José, José Jr., Trei)
- The Hairstons (Sammy, Jerry, Johnny, Jerry Jr., Scott)
- The Kessingers (Don, Keith, Grae)
- The Schofield/Werths (Ducky Schofield, Dick Schofield, and Jayson Werth). Werth is the grandson of Ducky Schofield and nephew of Dick Schofield, and also the stepson of Dennis Werth.

In addition to the pairs listed above, there have been 21 other pairs of grandfathers and grandsons who played Major League Baseball. The list of grandsons includes one current player: Mike Yastrzemski is the grandson of Hall of Famer Carl Yastrzemski.

There are third-generation families affiliated with MLB in roles other than team player:

- The Bossards (Emil, Marshall, Gene, Roger) are a family of MLB groundskeepers.
- The Bush family (George Herbert Walker Jr. was an original owner of the New York Mets; his grand-nephew George W. Bush was co-owner the Texas Rangers; and his nephew George H. W. Bush captained the Yale baseball team, played in the first two College World Series, and threw out many ceremonial first pitches while his nephew Joe Ellis was once president the Denver Broncos football team) are a family of sports executives.
- The DeWitts (brothers Bill DeWitt and Charlie: GM/owners of St. Louis Browns; Bill was also an executive for the Detroit Tigers and the Cincinnati Reds; William DeWitt Jr.: principal owner/managing partner of St. Louis Cardinals; Bill DeWitt III: St. Louis Cardinals President) are a family of MLB executives.
- The Rickeys (Branch Rickey, Branch Rickey Jr., Branch Barrett Rickey)
- The Runges (Ed, Paul, Brian) are a family of MLB Umpires.
- The Veecks (William Veeck Sr.: Chicago Cubs President; Bill Veeck: Cleveland Indians Owner, St. Louis Browns, and Chicago White Sox; Mike Veeck: owner of independent minor-league St. Paul Saints) are a family of MLB executives.
- The Comiskey family (Charles Comiskey: player, manager, and Chicago White Sox owner; J. Louis Comiskey and Grace Comiskey: Chicago White Sox owners; and Dorothy Comiskey Rigney and Chuck Comiskey: Chicago White Sox owners and Johnny Rigney player and husband of Dorothy Comiskey Rigney) were a family of MLB executives and players.
- The O'Malley and Seidler family (Walter O'Malley: Brooklyn/Los Angeles Dodgers President); Peter O'Malley: Los Angeles Dodgers President; Peter Seidler, grandson of Walter O'Malley: San Diego Padres Chairman) are a family of MLB executives.

There are fourth-generation families affiliated with MLB in roles other than team player:

- The Carays (Harry, Skip, Chip, Chris) are a family of MLB play-by-play broadcasters.

== Various potential four-generation families ==
As of 2026, there has never been a fourth-generation major league player. However, two potential fourth-generation players have been drafted and/or signed to minor-league contracts.

- Jake Boone (retired): In 2017, Jake Boone, a middle infielder, was selected by the Washington Nationals in the 38th round of the 2017 MLB draft, but did not sign. Jake's father is Bret Boone; his uncle is Aaron Boone; his grandfather is Bob Boone; and his great-grandfather was the late Ray Boone. Jake played college baseball at Princeton University for three seasons before signing a free-agent contract with the Nationals in July 2020. He was unable to play professional ball immediately after signing his contract because Minor League Baseball canceled its 2020 season. In 2021, he spent the entire season with Washington's Low-A East affiliate, the Fredericksburg Nationals. Heading into the 2022 season, Jake was reassigned to the National's Rookie-level affiliate, but was released on May 4, 2022. Between 2022 and 2024, Jake played in the independent Frontier League. He did not play in 2025, and appears to have retired.
- Luke Bell (still active): Luke Bell, a pitcher, was drafted by the Arizona Diamondbacks in the 34th round of the 2019 MLB draft. His father Mike Bell was a 13-season minor leaguer who played briefly for the Cincinnati Reds in 2000 and was the vice president of player development for the Diamondbacks before his death in March 2021. Luke Bell's uncle is David Bell; his grandfather is Buddy Bell; and his great-grandfather was the late Gus Bell. Luke Bell opted not to play Minor League Baseball in 2019 after he was drafted, In 2020 he made 5 appearances as a pitcher for Chandler-Gilbert Community College before the season was cut short by the COVID-19 pandemic. He transferred to Xavier University in 2021 and played three seasons for the Musketeers. Since 2023, he has been playing in the Chicago White Sox farm system, rising to the triple-A level in 2025.

There are three known cases of a great-grandson following in his great-grandfather's footsteps to play Major League Baseball. Bill Wilkinson played for the Seattle Mariners from 1985 to 1988; his great-grandfather, Jim Bluejacket played for Brooklyn in the Federal League in 1914-15 and for the Cincinnati Reds in 1916. More recently, Drew Pomeranz and his brother Stu Pomeranz, who played briefly in 2012, both followed in the footsteps of their great-grandfather Garland Buckeye who was a regular starting pitcher for the Cleveland Indians for three years in the mid-1920s and also appeared in one game each with two other teams.

The MacPhail family is the first family known to have four generations affiliated with Major League Baseball in roles other than as players. Larry was the general manager of the Reds and Dodgers as well as the president, general manager, and co-owner of the Yankees. Larry's son, Lee, was president and general manager of the Orioles, executive vice president and general manager of the Yankees, and president of the American League. Larry and Lee are also the only father-and-son duo to have been inducted into the Baseball Hall of Fame. The MacPhails became baseball's first three-generation family when Lee MacPhail III became an executive with the Reading Phillies of the Eastern League. Lee II's other son, Andy, is the president of the Phillies and was previously general manager of the Twins, president and chief executive officer of the Cubs, and president of baseball operations for the Orioles. The family became baseball's first four-generation family with Lee MacPhail III's son, Lee MacPhail IV, who has served as director of scouting for the Indians, Expos, Nationals, and Orioles.

== Key ==
Italic	Managed his son(s)
†	Elected to the Baseball Hall of Fame
*	Player is active

== List of players ==
=== Second–generation ===
Father	Positions	Son(s)	Positions
Bobby Adams	Infielder	Mike Adams	Outfielder
Jim Adduci	Outfielder / First baseman	Jim Adduci	Outfielder / First baseman
Eliézer Alfonzo	Catcher	Eliézer Alfonzo Jr.^{*}	Catcher
Sandy Alomar Sr.	Second baseman / Coach	Roberto Alomar^{†}	Second baseman
Sandy Alomar Sr.	Second baseman / Coach	Sandy Alomar Jr.	Catcher
Felipe Alou	Outfielder / Manager	Moisés Alou	Outfielder
Rubén Amaro Sr.	Infielder	Rubén Amaro Jr.	Outfielder / General manager
Ángel Aragón	Infielder / Outfielder	Jack Aragón	Pinch Runner / Manager
Tony Armas	Outfielder	Tony Armas Jr.	Pitcher
Earl Averill^{†}	Outfielder	Earl Averill Jr.	Catcher
Mike Bacsik	Pitcher	Mike Bacsik	Pitcher
Jim Bagby Sr.	Pitcher	Jim Bagby Jr.	Pitcher
Dusty Baker	Outfielder / Manager	Darren Baker^{*}	Second baseman / Outfielder
Floyd Bannister	Pitcher	Brian Bannister	Pitcher
Jesse Barfield	Outfielder	Josh Barfield	Second baseman
Clyde Barnhart	Outfielder	Vic Barnhart	Infielder
Charlie Beamon	Pitcher	Charlie Beamon Jr.	First baseman / Designated hitter
Steve Bedrosian	Pitcher	Cam Bedrosian	Pitcher
Clay Bellinger	Utility player	Cody Bellinger^{*}	Outfielder / First baseman
Dave Bennett	Pitcher	Erik Bennett	Pitcher
Yogi Berra^{†}	Catcher / Manager	Dale Berra	Infielder
Charlie Berry	Second baseman	Charlie Berry	Catcher / Umpire
Joe Berry	Catcher	Joe Berry	Infielder
Dante Bichette	Outfielder	Bo Bichette^{*}	Shortstop
Craig Biggio^{†}	Catcher / Outfielder / Second baseman	Cavan Biggio^{*}	Infielder / Outfielder
Bruce Bochy	Catcher / Manager	Brett Bochy	Pitcher
Bobby Bonds	Outfielder	Barry Bonds	Outfielder
Pedro Borbón	Pitcher	Pedro Borbón Jr.	Pitcher
Lyman Bostock	First baseman	Lyman Bostock	Outfielder
Chris Bourjos	Outfielder	Peter Bourjos	Outfielder
Mickey Brantley	Outfielder	Michael Brantley	Outfielder
Fred Brickell	Outfielder	Fritz Brickell	Infielder
Earle Brucker Sr.	Catcher	Earle Brucker Jr.	Catcher / Manager
Mike Brumley	Catcher	Mike Brumley	Infielder / Outfielder
Don Buford	Outfielder	Damon Buford	Outfielder
Enrique Burgos	Pitcher	Enrique Burgos^{*}	Pitcher
Jeff Burroughs	Outfielder	Sean Burroughs	Third baseman
Sal Butera	Catcher	Drew Butera	Catcher
Alex Cabrera	First baseman / Outfielder	Ramón Cabrera^{*}	Catcher
Mike Cameron	Outfielder	Daz Cameron^{*}	Outfielder
Dolph Camilli	First baseman	Doug Camilli	Catcher
Al Campanis	Second baseman / general manager	Jim Campanis	Catcher
José Canó	Pitcher	Robinson Canó^{*}	Second baseman
Mike Capel	Pitcher	Conner Capel^{*}	Outfielder
Cam Carreon	Catcher	Mark Carreon	Outfielder
Terry Clark	Pitcher	Matt Clark	First baseman
Roger Clemens	Pitcher	Kody Clemens*	Second baseman
Eddie Collins^{†}	Second baseman	Eddie Collins Jr.	Outfielder
Jeff Conine	Outfielder / First baseman	Griffin Conine^{*}	Outfielder
Ed Connolly	Catcher	Ed Connolly	Pitcher
Jimmy Cooney	Shortstop	Jimmy Cooney	Shortstop
Jimmy Cooney	Shortstop	Johnny Cooney	Pitcher / Outfielder
Mardie Cornejo	Pitcher	Nate Cornejo	Pitcher
Red Corriden	Shortstop / Manager	John Corriden	Infielder
Darron Cox	Catcher	Jonah Cox^{*}	Outfielder
Carl Crawford	Outfielder	Justin Crawford^{*}	Outfielder
Chris Cron	First baseman	C. J. Cron	First baseman
Chris Cron	First baseman	Kevin Cron	First baseman
Ed Crosby	Infielder	Bobby Crosby	Shortstop
Bill Crouch	Pitcher	Bill Crouch	Pitcher
Mike Darr	Pitcher	Mike Darr	Outfielder
Jerry DaVanon	Infielder	Jeff DaVanon	Outfielder
Mark Davidson	Outfielder	Logan Davidson^{*}	Infielder
Ron Davis	Pitcher	Ike Davis	First baseman
Willie Davis	Outfielder	Eric Anthony (Note: Anthony discovered that Davis was his biological father in 2018, after a DNA test and research.)	Outfielder
Iván DeJesús	Shortstop	Iván DeJesús Jr.	Second baseman
Art Demery	Outfielder	Larry Demery	Pitcher
Delino DeShields	Second baseman	Delino DeShields Jr.^{*}	Outfielder
Steve Dillard	Infielder	Tim Dillard	Pitcher
Herm Doscher	Third baseman	Jack Doscher	Pitcher
Doug Drabek	Pitcher	Kyle Drabek	Pitcher
Steve Dreyer	Pitcher	Jack Dreyer^{*}	Pitcher
Dave Duncan	Catcher	Chris Duncan	Outfielder
Dave Duncan	Catcher	Shelley Duncan	First baseman / Outfielder
Robert Ellis	Pitcher	Duke Ellis^{*}	Outfielder
Dick Ellsworth	Pitcher	Steve Ellsworth	Pitcher
Jim Eschen	Outfielder	Larry Eschen	Shortstop
José Escobar	Shortstop	Edwin Escobar^{*}	Pitcher
Bill Fahey	Catcher	Brandon Fahey	Infielder
John Farrell	Pitcher / Manager	Luke Farrell	Pitcher
Turk Farrell	Pitcher	Richard Dotson (Note: Dotson discovered that Farrell was his biological father in 2020, after a DNA test and research.)	Pitcher
Cecil Fielder	First baseman	Prince Fielder	First baseman
Bruce Fields	Outfielder / Pinch hitter	Daniel Fields	Outfielder
Bien Figueroa	Infielder	Cole Figueroa	Infielder
Mike Fitzgerald	First baseman	Tyler Fitzgerald^{*}	Centerfielder
Tom Fletcher	Pitcher	Darrin Fletcher	Catcher
Joe Flynn	Outfielder / Catcher	John Flynn	First baseman
Tito Francona	Outfielder / First baseman	Terry Francona	First baseman / Manager
Len Gabrielson	First baseman	Len Gabrielson	Outfielder
Charlie Ganzel	Catcher	Babe Ganzel	Outfielder
Luis García	Shortstop	Luis García Jr.^{*}	Infielder
Larry Gilbert	Outfielder	Charlie Gilbert	Outfielder
Larry Gilbert	Outfielder	Tookie Gilbert	First baseman
Tom Gordon	Pitcher	Dee Strange-Gordon	Second baseman
Tom Gordon	Pitcher	Nick Gordon^{*}	Second baseman
Peaches Graham	Catcher	Jack Graham	First baseman / Outfielder
Fred Green	Pitcher	Gary Green	Shortstop
Tom Grieve	Outfielder	Ben Grieve	Outfielder
Ken Griffey Sr.	Outfielder	Ken Griffey Jr.^{†}	Outfielder
Steve Grilli	Pitcher	Jason Grilli	Pitcher
Ray Grimes	First baseman	Oscar Grimes	Infielder
Ross Grimsley	Pitcher	Ross Grimsley	Pitcher
Vladimir Guerrero^{†}	Outfielder	Vladimir Guerrero Jr.^{*}	Third baseman / First baseman
Mark Guthrie	Pitcher	Dalton Guthrie^{*}	Infielder / Outfielder
Tony Gwynn^{†}	Outfielder	Tony Gwynn Jr.	Outfielder
Larry Haney	Catcher	Chris Haney	Pitcher
Bryan Harvey	Pitcher	Hunter Harvey^{*}	Pitcher
Greg Harris	Pitcher	Trent Harris^{*}	Pitcher
Charlie Hayes	Third baseman	Ke'Bryan Hayes^{*}	Third baseman
Jim Hegan	Catcher	Mike Hegan	First baseman
Ken Heintzelman	Pitcher	Tom Heintzelman	Second baseman
Clarence Heise	Pitcher	Jim Heise	Pitcher
Fernando Hernández	Pitcher	Jonathan Hernández^{*}	Pitcher
Matt Holliday	Outfielder	Jackson Holliday^{*}	Shortstop / Second baseman
Wally Hood	Outfielder	Wally Hood	Pitcher
Bruce Howard	Pitcher	David Howard	Shortstop
Tim Hulett	Infielder	Tug Hulett	Infielder
Randy Hundley	Catcher	Todd Hundley	Catcher
Pat Jacquez	Pitcher	Tom Jacquez	Pitcher
Kevin Jarvis	Pitcher	Bryce Jarvis^{*}	Pitcher
Julián Javier	Second baseman	Stan Javier	Outfielder
Johnny Jeter	Outfielder	Shawn Jeter	Outfielder
Dave Johnson	Pitcher	Steve Johnson	Pitcher
Ernie Johnson	Shortstop	Don Johnson	Second baseman
Rankin Johnson Sr.	Pitcher	Rankin Johnson Jr.	Pitcher
Ron Johnson	First baseman	Chris Johnson	Third baseman
Eric Karros	First baseman	Kyle Karros^{*}	Third baseman
Pat Kelly	Catcher	Casey Kelly^{*}	Pitcher
Fred Kendall	Catcher	Jason Kendall	Catcher
Bob Kennedy	Third baseman / Outfielder	Terry Kennedy	Catcher
Marty Keough	Outfielder	Matt Keough	Pitcher
Don Kessinger	Shortstop	Keith Kessinger	Shortstop
Lew Krausse Sr.	Pitcher	Lew Krausse Jr.	Pitcher
Bill Kunkel	Pitcher	Jeff Kunkel	Shortstop
Joe Landrum	Pitcher	Bill Landrum	Pitcher
Max Lanier	Pitcher	Hal Lanier	Infielder / Manager
Dave LaRoche	Pitcher	Adam LaRoche	First baseman
Dave LaRoche	Pitcher	Andy LaRoche	Third baseman
Vernon Law	Pitcher	Vance Law	Infielder
Bill Laxton	Pitcher	Brett Laxton	Pitcher
Thornton Lee	Pitcher	Don Lee	Pitcher
Charlie Leibrandt	Pitcher	Brandon Leibrandt^{*}	Pitcher
Al Leiter	Pitcher	Jack Leiter^{*}	Pitcher
Mark Leiter	Pitcher	Mark Leiter Jr.^{*}	Pitcher
Dutch Lerchen	Shortstop	George Lerchen	Outfielder / Pinch hitter
Glenn Liebhardt Sr.	Pitcher	Glenn Liebhardt Jr.	Pitcher
Freddie Lindstrom^{†}	Third baseman / Outfielder	Chuck Lindstrom	Catcher
Jack Lively	Pitcher	Buddy Lively	Pitcher
George Lombard	Outfielder	George Lombard Jr.^{*}	Shortstop
Steve Lombardozzi	Second baseman	Steve Lombardozzi Jr.	Second baseman
Connie Mack^{†}	Catcher / Manager	Earle Mack	Catcher / Manager
Harl Maggert	Outfielder	Harl Maggert	Outfielder / Third baseman
Willard Mains	Pitcher	Jim Mains	Pitcher
Charlie Malay	Second baseman	Joe Malay	First baseman
Barney Martin	Pitcher	Jerry Martin	Outfielder
Carlos Martínez	Infielder	José Martínez	Outfielder
Sandy Martínez	Catcher	Ángel Martínez^{*}	Infielder
Clyde Mashore	Outfielder	Damon Mashore	Outfielder
Gary Matthews	Outfielder	Gary Matthews Jr.	Outfielder
Nelson Mathews	Outfielder	T. J. Mathews	Pitcher
Wally Mattick	Outfielder	Bobby Mattick	Shortstop / Manager
Dave May	Outfielder	Derrick May	Outfielder
Pinky May	Third baseman	Milt May	Catcher
John Mayberry	First baseman	John Mayberry Jr.	Outfielder
Jim McAndrew	Pitcher	Jamie McAndrew	Pitcher
Rodney McCray	Outfielder	Grant McCray^{*}	Centerfielder
Lance McCullers	Pitcher	Lance McCullers Jr.^{*}	Pitcher
Dave McKay	Second baseman / Third baseman	Cody McKay	Catcher
Jim McKnight	Infielder	Jeff McKnight	Infielder / Outfielder
Hal McRae	Designated hitter / Manager	Brian McRae	Outfielder
Frank Meinke	Infielder / Pitcher	Bob Meinke	Shortstop
Willie Mills	Pitcher	Art Mills	Pitcher
Brian Milner	Catcher	Hoby Milner^{*}	Pitcher
Raúl Mondesí	Outfielder	Adalberto Mondesí	Infielder
René Monteagudo	Pitcher	Aurelio Monteagudo	Pitcher
Gene Moore	Pitcher	Gene Moore	Outfielder
Guy Morton	Pitcher	Guy Morton Jr.	Pinch hitter
Manny Mota	Outfielder	Andy Mota	Second baseman
Manny Mota	Outfielder	José Mota	Second baseman
Walter Mueller	Outfielder	Don Mueller	Outfielder
Bill Narleski	Infielder	Ray Narleski	Pitcher
Julio Navarro	Pitcher	Jaime Navarro	Pitcher
Dick Nen	First baseman	Robb Nen	Pitcher
Phil Nevin	Third Baseman / Manager	Tyler Nevin^{*}	Infielder
Chet Nichols Sr.	Pitcher	Chet Nichols Jr.	Pitcher
Joe Niekro	Pitcher	Lance Niekro	First baseman
Ron Northey	Outfielder	Scott Northey	Outfielder
John O'Donoghue	Pitcher	John O'Donoghue	Pitcher
Frank Okrie	Pitcher	Len Okrie	Catcher
Ed Olivares	Outfielder	Omar Olivares	Pitcher
Bob Oliver	First baseman / Outfielder	Darren Oliver	Pitcher
Diomedes Olivo	Pitcher	Gilberto Rondón	Pitcher
Jim O'Rourke^{†}	Outfielder / Manager	Jimmy O'Rourke	Infielder / Outfielder
Patsy O'Rourke	Shortstop	Joe O'Rourke	Pinch hitter
Tiny Osborne	Pitcher	Bobo Osborne	First baseman
Steve Partenheimer	Third baseman	Stan Partenheimer	Pitcher
Cliff Pastornicky	Third baseman	Tyler Pastornicky	Shortstop
Stu Pederson	Outfielder	Joc Pederson^{*}	Outfielder
Gerónimo Peña	Second Baseman	Jeremy Peña^{*}	Shortstop
Tony Peña	Catcher / Manager	Tony Peña Jr.	Shortstop / Pitcher
Tony Peña	Catcher / Manager	Francisco Peña^{*}	Catcher
Tony Pérez^{†}	Infielder / Manager	Eduardo Pérez	Infielder
Jay Pettibone	Pitcher	Jonathan Pettibone	Pitcher
Herman Pillette	Pitcher	Duane Pillette	Pitcher
Paul Quantrill	Pitcher	Cal Quantrill^{*}	Pitcher
Mel Queen	Pitcher	Mel Queen	Pitcher / Manager
Tim Raines^{†}	Outfielder	Tim Raines Jr.	Outfielder
Fred Rath Sr.	Pitcher	Fred Rath Jr.	Pitcher
Walt Ripley	Pitcher	Allen Ripley	Pitcher
Cal Ripken Sr.	Manager	Billy Ripken	Second baseman
Cal Ripken Sr.	Manager	Cal Ripken Jr.^{†}	Shortstop / Third baseman
Iván Rodríguez^{†}	Catcher	Dereck Rodríguez^{*}	Pitcher
Gary Roenicke	Outfielder	Josh Roenicke	Pitcher
Kevin Romine	Outfielder	Andrew Romine	Infielder
Kevin Romine	Outfielder	Austin Romine	Catcher
Pete Rose	Infielder / Outfielder / Manager	Pete Rose Jr.	Infielder
Bruce Ruffin	Pitcher	Chance Ruffin	Pitcher
Jeff Russell	Pitcher	James Russell	Pitcher
Mark Ryal	Outfielder	Rusty Ryal	Infielder
Scott Sanders	Pitcher	Cam Sanders^{*}	Pitcher
Ralph Savidge	Pitcher	Don Savidge	Pitcher
Ducky Schofield	Infielder	Dick Schofield	Shortstop
Joe Schultz Sr.	Outfielder	Joe Schultz Jr.	Catcher / Manager
Diego Seguí	Pitcher	David Segui	First baseman
Jeff Sellers	Pitcher	Justin Sellers	Infielder
Jeff Shaw	Pitcher	Travis Shaw	First baseman
Earl Sheely	First baseman	Bud Sheely	Catcher
Larry Sheets	Outfielder	Gavin Sheets^{*}	Outfielder
Dick Siebert	First baseman	Paul Siebert	Pitcher
George Sisler^{†}	First baseman / Manager	Dave Sisler	Pitcher
George Sisler^{†}	First baseman / Manager	Dick Sisler	First baseman / Manager
Bob Skinner	Outfielder / Manager	Joel Skinner	Catcher / Manager
Roy Smalley	Shortstop	Roy Smalley	Shortstop
Dwight Smith	Outfielder	Dwight Smith Jr.^{*}	Outfielder
Brian Snyder	Pitcher	Brandon Snyder	Infielder
Steve Soderstrom	Pitcher	Tyler Soderstrom^{*}	Catcher
Chris Speier	Shortstop	Justin Speier	Pitcher
Ed Spiezio	Third baseman	Scott Spiezio	Infielder
Ed Sprague Sr.	Pitcher	Ed Sprague Jr.	Third baseman
Ebba St. Claire	Catcher	Randy St. Claire	Pitcher
Dave Stenhouse	Pitcher	Mike Stenhouse	Outfielder
Joe Stephenson	Catcher	Jerry Stephenson	Pitcher
Ron Stillwell	Infielder	Kurt Stillwell	Infielder
Mel Stottlemyre	Pitcher	Mel Stottlemyre Jr.	Pitcher
Mel Stottlemyre	Pitcher	Todd Stottlemyre	Pitcher
Billy Sullivan	Catcher / Manager	Billy Sullivan Jr.	Catcher
Haywood Sullivan	Catcher / Manager	Marc Sullivan	Catcher
George Susce	Catcher	George Susce	Pitcher
Steve Swisher	Catcher	Nick Swisher	First baseman / Outfielder
Chuck Tanner	Outfielder / Manager	Bruce Tanner	Pitcher
José Tartabull	Outfielder	Danny Tartabull	Outfielder
Fernando Tatis	Third Baseman	Fernando Tatis Jr.^{*}	Shortstop
Luis Tiant Sr.	Pitcher	Luis Tiant	Pitcher
Tom Timmermann	Pitcher	Phil Leftwich	Pitcher
Wayne Tolleson	Infielder	Steve Tolleson	Infielder
Pablo Torrealba	Pitcher	Steve Torrealba	Catcher
Ricardo Torres	Catcher / First baseman	Gil Torres	Infielder
Mike Tresh	Catcher	Tom Tresh	Outfielder
Hal Trosky	First baseman	Hal Trosky Jr.	Pitcher
Dizzy Trout	Pitcher	Steve Trout	Pitcher
Brian Turang	Outfielder	Brice Turang^{*}	Infielder
Al Unser	Catcher	Del Unser	Outfielder
José Valentín	Shortstop	Jesmuel Valentín	Infielder
Andy Van Slyke	Outfielder	Scott Van Slyke	Outfielder
Gary Varsho	Outfielder	Daulton Varsho^{*}	Catcher / Outfielder
Max Venable	Outfielder / Designated hitter	Will Venable	Outfielder
Ozzie Virgil Sr.	Infielder / Outfielder	Ozzie Virgil Jr.	Catcher
Billy Wagner^{†}	Pitcher	Will Wagner^{*}	Infielder
Howard Wakefield	Catcher	Dick Wakefield	Outfielder
Dixie Walker	Pitcher	Dixie Walker	Outfielder
Dixie Walker	Pitcher	Harry Walker	Outfielder / Manager
Tom Walker	Pitcher	Neil Walker	Second baseman
Tim Wallach	Third Baseman / Coach	Chad Wallach^{*}	Catcher
Ed Walsh^{†}	Pitcher	Ed Walsh Jr.	Pitcher
Gary Ward	Outfielder	Daryle Ward	Outfielder
John Wathan	Catcher / Manager	Dusty Wathan	Catcher
David Weathers	Pitcher	Ryan Weathers^{*}	Pitcher
Hank Webb	Pitcher	Ryan Webb	Pitcher
Dennis Werth	First baseman / Outfielder	Jayson Werth	Outfielder
Jo-Jo White	Outfielder	Mike White	Outfielder
Maury Wills	Shortstop	Bump Wills	Second baseman
Jack Wilson	Shortstop	Jacob Wilson^{*}	Shortstop
Mookie Wilson	Outfielder	Preston Wilson	Outfielder
Bobby Wine	Shortstop / Manager	Robbie Wine	Catcher
Hughie Wise	Catcher / Manager	Casey Wise	Second baseman / Shortstop
Bobby Witt	Pitcher	Bobby Witt Jr.^{*}	Shortstop / Third baseman
Joe Wood	Pitcher	Joe Wood	Pitcher
Clyde Wright	Pitcher	Jaret Wright	Pitcher
Del Young	Outfielder	Del Young	Infielder
Eric Young	Second baseman	Eric Young Jr.	Center fielder

=== Third–generation ===
Grandfather	Position	Son(s)	Position	Grandson(s)	Position
Joe Coleman	Pitcher	Joe Coleman	Pitcher	Casey Coleman^{*}	Pitcher
José Cruz	Outfielder	José Cruz Jr.	Outfielder	Trei Cruz^{*}	Outfielder
Gus Bell	Outfielder	Buddy Bell	Third baseman / Manager	David Bell	Infielder / Manager
Gus Bell	Outfielder	Buddy Bell	Third baseman / Manager	Mike Bell	Infielder
Ray Boone	Infielder	Bob Boone	Catcher / Manager	Aaron Boone	Third baseman / Manager
Ray Boone	Infielder	Bob Boone	Catcher / Manager	Bret Boone	Second baseman
Sam Hairston	Catcher	Jerry Hairston Sr.	Outfielder	Jerry Hairston Jr.	Outfielder
Sam Hairston	Catcher	Jerry Hairston Sr.	Outfielder	Scott Hairston	Outfielder
Sam Hairston	Catcher	Johnny Hairston	Catcher / Outfielder		

== Other second-generation MLB personnel ==
=== Parent played in top-level professional baseball ===
The following families had a parent play top-level professional baseball in a league other than MLB and a child who played in MLB.

Parent	Position	League	Son(s)	Position
Luis Aparicio Sr.	SS	Venezuelan Professional Baseball League	Luis Aparicio^{†}	SS
Helen Callaghan	CF	All-American Girls Professional Baseball League	Casey Candaele	UTL
Pedro Cepeda	SS/1B	Puerto Rico Baseball League	Orlando Cepeda^{†}	1B
Lourdes Gurriel	LF, 1B	Cuba national baseball team	Yuli Gurriel^{*}	1B
Lourdes Gurriel	LF, 1B	Cuba national baseball team	Lourdes Gurriel Jr.^{*}	LF
Kazuhiro Kuroda	CF	Nippon Professional Baseball	Hiroki Kuroda	P
Lee Jong-beom	RF	Korea Baseball Organization	Jung-hoo Lee^{*}	CF
Leon Lee	1B	Nippon Professional Baseball	Derrek Lee	1B
Víctor Mesa	CF/LF	Cuba national baseball team	Víctor Mesa Jr.^{*}	OF
Andy Morales	3B	Cuba national baseball team	Yohandy Morales^{*}	3B/1B
Lázaro Vargas	3B/1B	Cuba national baseball team	Miguel Vargas^{*}	2B

=== Umpiring families ===
*	Umpire is active

Father	League	Son	League^{1}
Shag Crawford	NL	Jerry Crawford^{2}	NL/MLB
Lou DiMuro	AL	Mike DiMuro	AL/MLB, CL (Japan)
Lou DiMuro	AL	Ray DiMuro	AL
Tom Gorman	NL	Brian Gorman	NL/MLB
Ed Runge	AL	Paul Runge	NL
Paul Runge	NL	Brian Runge	NL/MLB
Harry Wendelstedt	NL	Hunter Wendelstedt	NL/MLB

^1 The National and American Leagues consolidated umpiring crews beginning in the 2000 season; umpires who worked after the consolidation are denoted with "MLB".
^2 Joe Crawford, another son of Shag Crawford and brother of Jerry Crawford, is an official in the National Basketball Association.

== See also ==
- List of professional sports families
- List of family relations in American football
  - List of second-generation National Football League players
- List of association football (soccer) families
  - List of African association football families
  - List of European association football families
    - List of English association football families
    - List of former Yugoslavia association football families
    - List of Scottish football families
    - List of Spanish association football families
  - Category:Association football families
- List of Australian rules football families
- List of second-generation National Basketball Association players
- List of boxing families
- List of chess families
- List of International cricket families
- List of family relations in the National Hockey League
- List of family relations in rugby league
- List of international rugby union families
- List of professional wrestling families
