= Jerry Hairston Sr. =

American baseball player (born 1952)

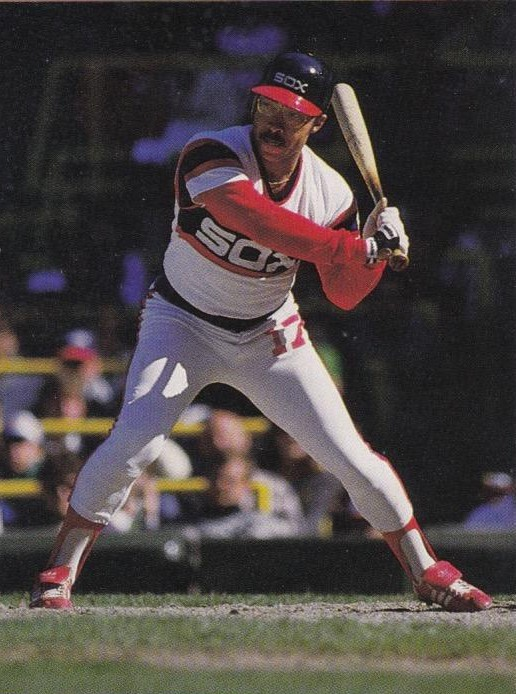
- Outfielder
- Born: February 16, 1952 (age 74); Birmingham, Alabama, U.S.
- Batted: Switch Threw: Right

MLB debut
- July 26, 1973, for the Chicago White Sox

Last MLB appearance
- September 25, 1989, for the Chicago White Sox

MLB statistics
- Batting average: .258
- Home runs: 30
- Runs batted in: 205
- Stats at Baseball Reference

Teams
- Chicago White Sox (1973–1977); Pittsburgh Pirates (1977); Chicago White Sox (1981–1989)

Jerry Wayne Hairston Sr. (born February 16, 1952) is an American former left fielder in Major League Baseball, and the father of Jerry Hairston Jr. and Scott Hairston. During his 14-year career, Hairston specialized as a pinch hitter.

== Career ==
Hairston played 14 seasons in the majors, mostly with the Chicago White Sox and part of one season with the Pittsburgh Pirates. He also played three years (from 1978 to 1980) with Durango of the Mexican League. Hairston is the White Sox's all-time leader in pinch hits. While playing in Mexico, Hairston won a batting title and twice represented Mexican League teams at the Caribbean Series. He met his wife, Esperanza Arellano, in Hermosillo, Mexico and the couple held a wedding ceremony at Héctor Espino Stadium.

On April 15, 1983, Hairston broke a perfect game bid by Milt Wilcox of the Detroit Tigers, singling with two out in the ninth inning.

Hairston is the White Sox's all-time leader in pinch hits with 90, hitting .258 in 349 plate appearances as a pinch hitter with 8 home runs.

== Personal life ==
Hairston was raised a Jehovah's Witnesses by his father, and credits his faith for getting him through four seasons in Mexico.

He is the son of former major leaguer, Sam, and the brother of another, Johnny. He is also the father of Jerry Hairston Jr. and Scott Hairston.

The Hairston family is one of only three families (along with the Boone family and the Bell family) to have had three generations of major league players.

== See also ==
- List of second-generation Major League Baseball players
