= Larry Eschen =

American baseball player (1920–2015)

- Shortstop
- Born: September 22, 1920; Suffern, New York, U.S.
- Died: June 9, 2015 (aged 94); Gainesville, Georgia, U.S.
- Batted: Right Threw: Right

MLB debut
- June 16, 1942, for the Philadelphia Athletics

Last MLB appearance
- July 17, 1942, for the Philadelphia Athletics

MLB statistics
- Plate appearances: 15
- Bases on balls: 4
- Hits: 0
- Stats at Baseball Reference

Teams
- Philadelphia Athletics (1942)

Lawrence Edward Eschen (September 22, 1920 – June 9, 2015) was an American Major League Baseball infielder who played in 1942 with the Philadelphia Athletics. He was born in Suffern, New York. He batted and threw right-handed. Eschen had no hits in 11 at-bats, in 12 games, with four walks. His father, Jim, also played in Major League Baseball, with the Cleveland Indians.

== See also ==
- List of second-generation Major League Baseball players
