= Jim Eschen =

American baseball player (1891–1960)

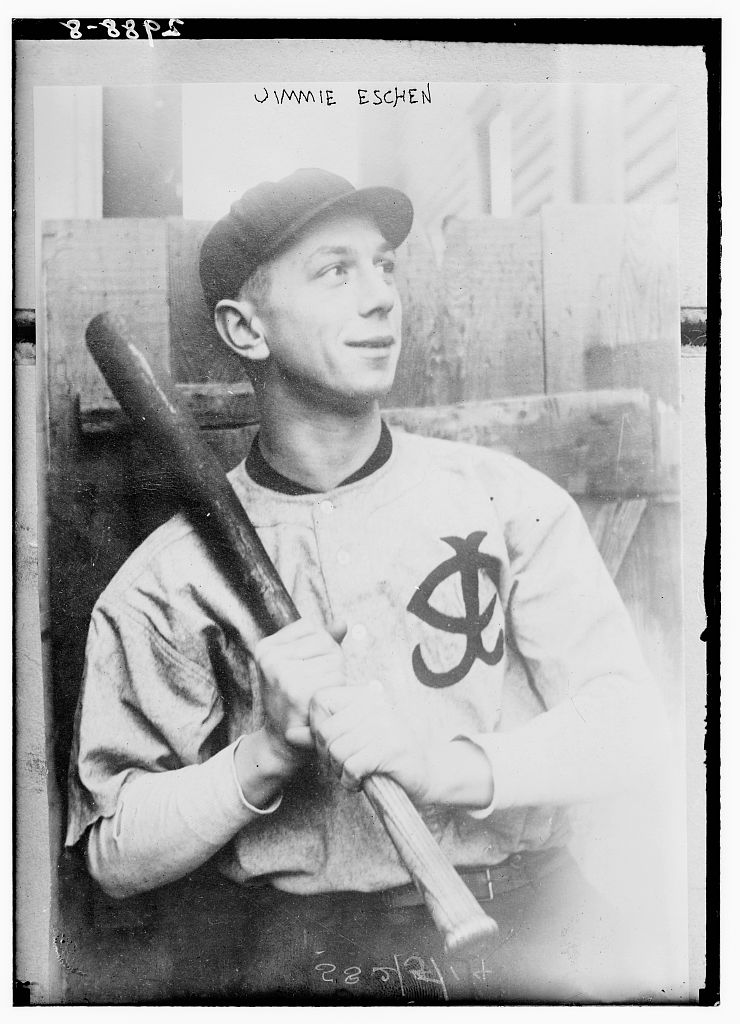
- Outfielder
- Born: August 21, 1891; Brooklyn, New York, U.S.
- Died: September 27, 1960 (aged 69); Sloatsburg, New York, U.S.
- Batted: Right Threw: Right

MLB debut
- July 10, 1915, for the Cleveland Indians

Last MLB appearance
- July 29, 1915, for the Cleveland Indians

MLB statistics
- Batting average: .238
- Home runs: 0
- Runs batted in: 2
- Stats at Baseball Reference

Teams
- Cleveland Indians (1915)

James Godrich Eschen (August 21, 1891 – September 27, 1960) was an American Major League Baseball outfielder who played in 1915 with the Cleveland Indians. He batted and threw right-handed. Eschen had ten hits in 42 at-bats, in 15 games, with a .238 batting average. He was born in Brooklyn, New York and died in Sloatsburg, New York. His son, Larry, also played in Major League Baseball, with the Philadelphia Athletics.
