= Jerry Hairston Jr. =

American baseball player (born 1976)

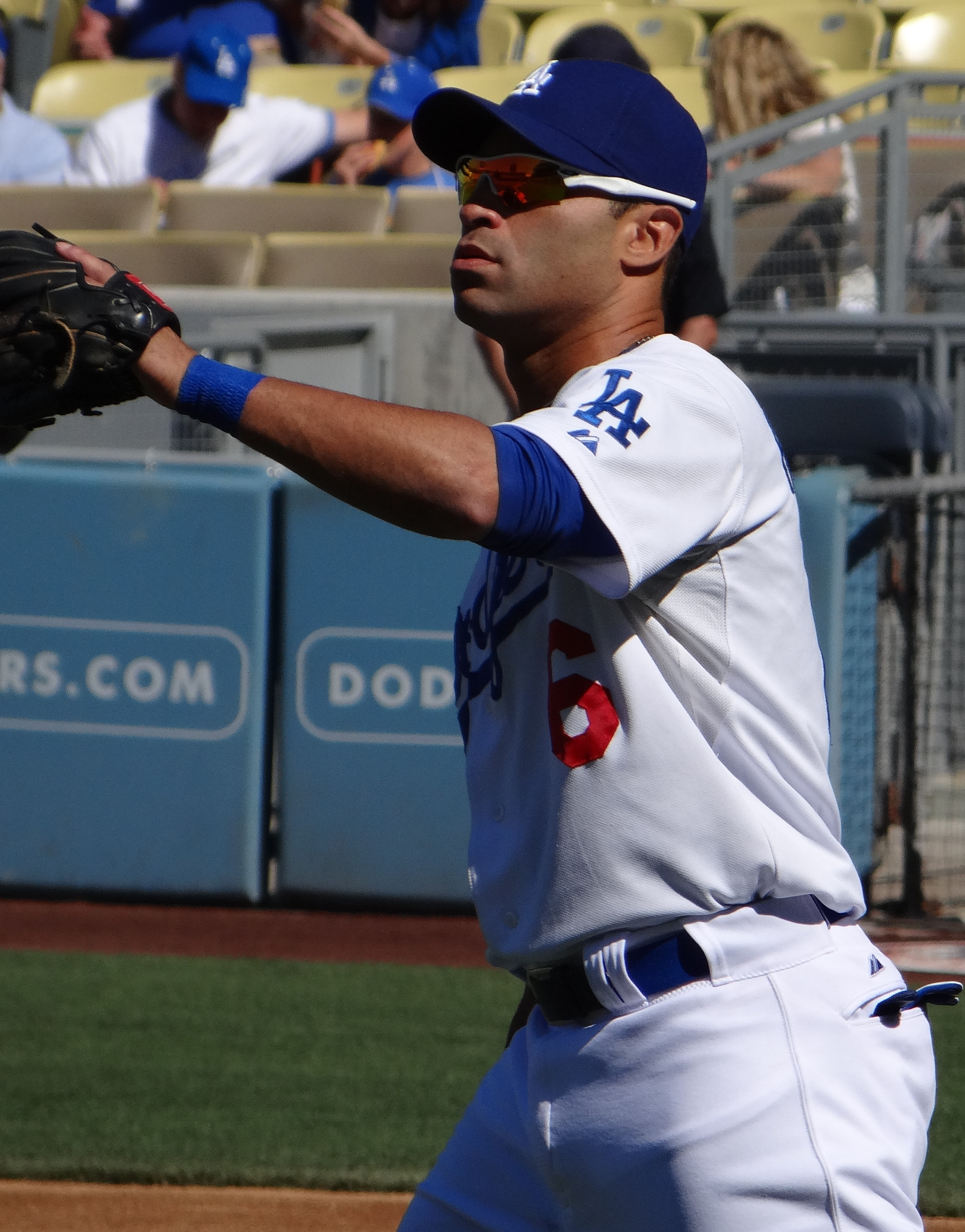
- Hairston with the Los Angeles Dodgers in 2012
- Infielder / Outfielder
- Born: May 29, 1976 (age 50); Des Moines, Iowa, U.S.
- Batted: Right Threw: Right

MLB debut
- September 11, 1998, for the Baltimore Orioles

Last MLB appearance
- September 25, 2013, for the Los Angeles Dodgers

MLB statistics
- Batting average: .257
- Home runs: 70
- Runs batted in: 420
- Stats at Baseball Reference

Teams
- Baltimore Orioles (1998–2004); Chicago Cubs (2005–2006); Texas Rangers (2006–2007); Cincinnati Reds (2008–2009); New York Yankees (2009); San Diego Padres (2010); Washington Nationals (2011); Milwaukee Brewers (2011); Los Angeles Dodgers (2012–2013)

Career highlights and awards
- World Series champion (2009)

Jerry Wayne Hairston Jr. (born May 29, 1976) is an American former professional baseball infielder and outfielder. He played 16 seasons in Major League Baseball (MLB) for the Baltimore Orioles, Chicago Cubs, Texas Rangers, Cincinnati Reds, New York Yankees, San Diego Padres, Washington Nationals, Milwaukee Brewers, and Los Angeles Dodgers. He played every position except pitcher and catcher during his baseball career. He is the grandson of former major leaguer Sam Hairston, the son of former major leaguer Jerry Hairston Sr., and the brother of Scott Hairston.

== Early life and college ==
Hairston attended Naperville North High School in Illinois, and was a two-time All-State selection in baseball and an all-area selection in basketball. He was drafted in the 42nd round of the 1995 Major League Baseball draft by the Baltimore Orioles but chose instead to go to college.

Hairston played college ball at Southern Illinois University in 1996 and 1997, where he batted .360 for his career and was the Missouri Valley Conference Freshman of the Year in 1996. In both years he played collegiate summer baseball in the Cape Cod Baseball League, playing for the Bourne Braves in 1996, and the Wareham Gatemen in 1997. In 2009, he was inducted as a member of the Saluki Hall of Fame.

== Professional career ==
=== Baltimore Orioles ===
Hairston was drafted in the 11th round of the 1997 Major League Baseball draft by the Baltimore Orioles. He made his professional debut as a shortstop in 1997 with the rookie-league Bluefield Orioles, where he hit .330 in 59 games. In 1998, he made a fast rise up the farm system and moved to second base. Starting in High-A with the Frederick Keys, he hit .302 in 80 games. He was promoted to the AA Bowie Baysox, where he hit .326 in 55 games. He was promoted to the majors and made his major league debut with the Orioles on September 11, 1998, against the Anaheim Angels. He appeared in seven games that year, serving primarily as a pinch runner or late-inning defensive replacement.

He began the 1999 season in Triple-A with the Rochester Red Wings, before being called up in June to replace the injured Delino DeShields at second base. Hairston hit .277 with two home runs and seven RBI in 25 games before returning to the minors. He got his first hit on June 27 off of New York Yankees pitcher Orlando Hernández and his first home run on July 1 off of Joey Hamilton of the Toronto Blue Jays. Hairston was called up again in September, hitting .269 with four home runs, nine stolen bases, and 17 RBI in 50 games on the season. The Orioles planned to make Hairston the everyday second baseman for the 2000 season, but a shoulder injury that required surgery in May changed their plans. He was finally called up on August 12, hitting .250 with five home runs and 19 RBI in 49 games as an everyday player.

In 2001, Hairston was the Orioles starting second baseman. He hit .233 with eight home runs, 29 stolen bases, and 47 RBI in 159 games that year. His flashy style of play drew criticism from inside the organization and from rivals, including the Yankees. The Orioles made Hairston the leadoff hitter heading into the 2002 season. However, his patience at the plate did not improve as much as the organization had hoped and second base prospect Brian Roberts was promoted on May 22. The two shared playing time until Roberts was sent back down in July. In total, Hairston hit .268 with five home runs, 32 RBI, and 21 stolen bases in 122 games that year.

He began the 2003 season on a hot streak, hitting .287 with two home runs, 16 RBI, and a league-leading 14 stolen bases through 42 games. Then, on May 20, he caught his foot on the edge of home plate while batting and broke his foot. The injury required surgery to fix, and Hairston was out of action until September. In his place, Robert hit .270 with five home runs, 41 RBI, and 23 stolen bases in 112 games.

In 2004, Hairston broke his finger sliding into third base during the first inning of the Orioles' first spring training game, ending the competition for the second base job prematurely. When Hairston returned in May, he was made the team's DH while Roberts remained at second. He managed to hit .303 and also played all three outfield positions until a broken ankle ended his season in mid-August.

=== Chicago Cubs ===
In January 2005 Hairston was traded (along with Oriole prospects Mike Fontenot and David Crouthers) to the Chicago Cubs for Sammy Sosa. He played all three outfield positions and split time at second base with Todd Walker and Neifi Perez. The Cubs attempted to use Hairston as a leadoff man, but he finished the 2005 season with an unremarkable .336 on-base percentage and stole only eight bases in 17 attempts. On July 15, he hit his first career grand slam in an 11–1 victory over the Pittsburgh Pirates. On August 31, Derek Lowe of the Los Angeles Dodgers pitched a one-hitter against the Cubs; Hairston's first inning infield hit was Chicago's only hit. In 2006, he hit .207 in 38 games, playing mostly at second base.

=== Texas Rangers ===
On May 31, 2006, Hairston was traded to the Texas Rangers for Phil Nevin. He hit .205 in 63 games as both a starter and late-inning defensive replacement, and was designated for assignment after the season. The Rangers re-signed him to a minor league contract with an invitation to spring training before the 2007 season. Hairston won a spot on the opening day roster, as a reserve outfielder and utility player. He missed time in May due to a pinched nerve in his neck and in August from a back injury. Hairston hit just .189 with three home runs, 16 RBI, and five stolen bases on the season.

=== Cincinnati Reds ===
On March 3, 2008, Hairston signed a minor league contract with the Cincinnati Reds. Hairston credits newly hired Reds manager Dusty Baker, who managed him while with the Cubs, for saving his career after struggling in 2006 and 2007. On April 21, his contract was purchased by the Reds and he was added to the roster. Hairston broke his thumb sliding into second base on June 9, the same game Ken Griffey Jr. hit his 600th home run. He also missed time with a hamstring injury. After coming off the disabled list, Hairston re-aggravated the injury in his first game back. Despite these setbacks he enjoyed a nice bounce-back season in 2008, hitting .326 with a .384 on-base percentage across 297 plate appearances. He also had 15 stolen bases, his most since 2002, despite only playing in 80 games.

On January 7, 2009, he re-signed with the Reds; the contract contained $2 million in guaranteed money. Hairston represented Mexico at the 2009 World Baseball Classic alongside his brother Scott. Hairston's mother was born in Mexico, making him eligible to play for the Mexican team. He had four hits in 14 at-bats for Team Mexico. Hairston hit .254 with a .397 OBP, eight home runs, and 27 RBI in 86 games for Cincinnati, mostly playing second, third, and shortstop.

=== New York Yankees ===
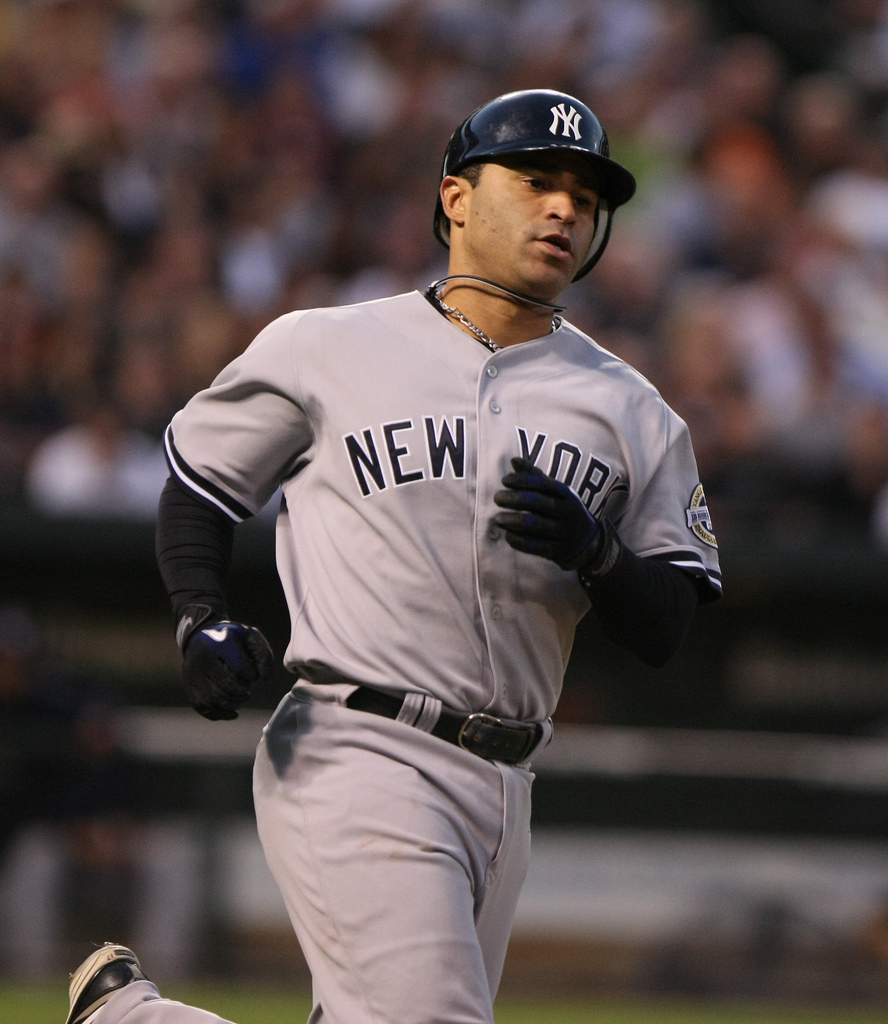
Hairston with the New York Yankees in 2009.

On July 31, 2009, he was traded to the New York Yankees for minor league catcher Chase Weems. The move was made to help shore up the team's bench, with Brett Gardner on the disabled list, and to spell Johnny Damon, Derek Jeter, and Alex Rodriguez when needed. On August 1, Hairston got his first hit and RBI as a Yankee. In his time with the Yankees, he hit .237 with two home runs and 12 RBIs in 45 games

On October 17, 2009, he got his first career post-season hit in his first career post-season at-bat, and later ended a 13-inning ALCS Game 2 by scoring on an error by the Angels' Maicer Izturis. This gave the Yankees a 2–0 advantage going into the third game of the series. He had one hit in six at-bats for the Yankees in the 2009 World Series.

=== San Diego Padres ===
On January 18, 2010, Hairston signed a one-year, $2.15 million contract with the San Diego Padres, the same team that his brother, Scott Hairston, was playing on. After Everth Cabrera went down with a hamstring injury in April, Hairston became the team's starting shortstop for much of the season's first half. He also replaced David Eckstein at second base when the veteran suffered a calf strain in July.

Hairston's 2010 season was cut short by injury. He suffered an elbow injury at the end of August and then broke the tibia in his right leg a week after coming off the disabled list. Hairston still played in 119 games with the Padres, hitting .244 with a career-high 10 home runs (tied with 2009) and 50 RBI, despite playing his home games at notoriously pitcher friendly Petco Park.

=== Washington Nationals ===
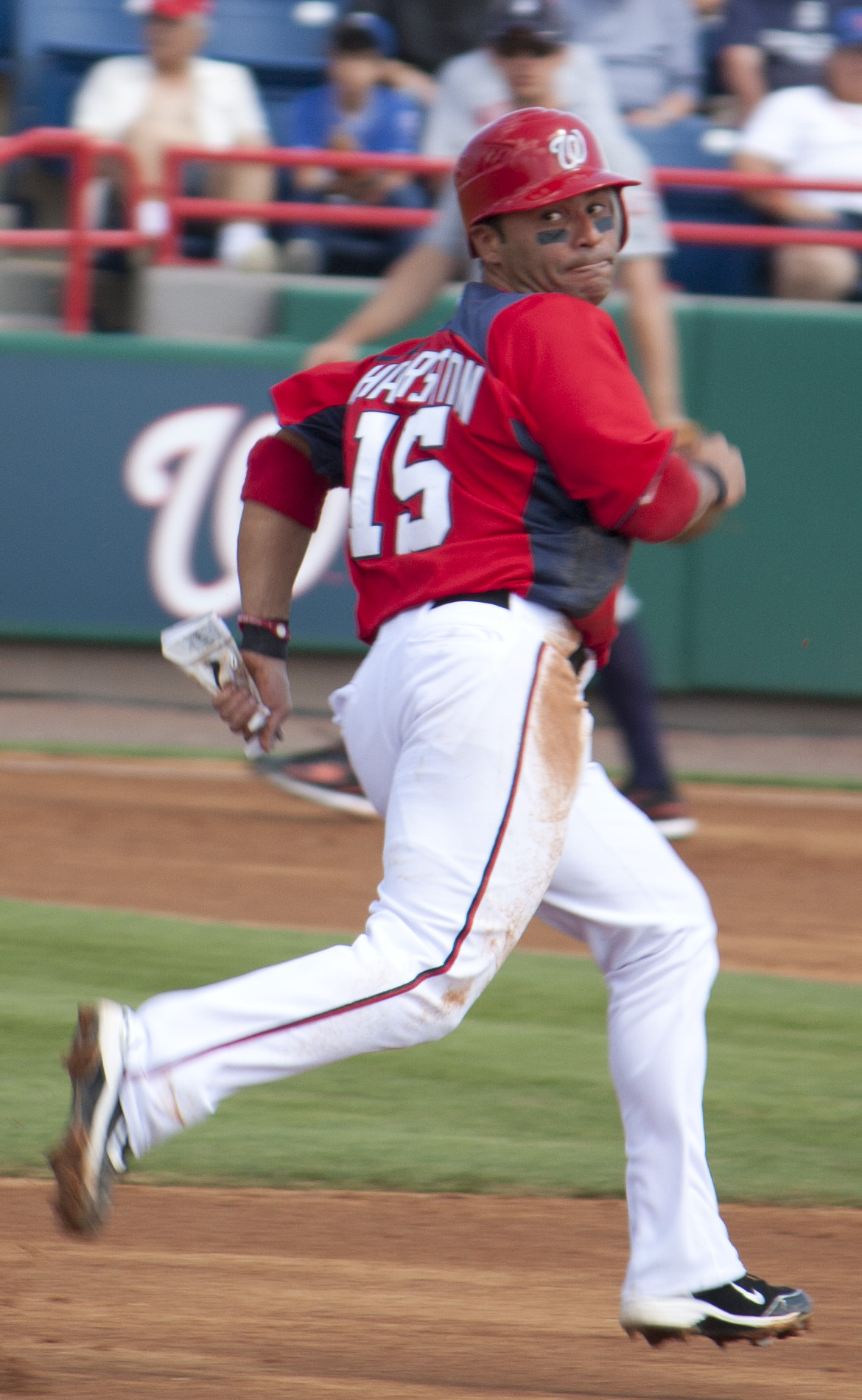
Hairston with Nationals in 2011 spring training.

On January 19, 2011, Hairston agreed to a one-year, $2 million contract with the Washington Nationals that included over $1 million in incentives. He became the team's starting third baseman after Ryan Zimmerman missed significant time to an abdominal injury. He missed most of July with a broken wrist after being hit by Angels pitcher Dan Haren. On July 20, his first game back from the disabled list, Hairston had three hits, including a two-run home run off J.A. Happ. He played in 75 games for the Nationals, hitting .268 with four home runs and 24 RBI.

=== Milwaukee Brewers ===
On July 30, 2011, Hairston was traded to the Milwaukee Brewers for Double-A outfielder Erik Komatsu. The trade was made in order to help fill in for injured second baseman Rickie Weeks and outfielder Carlos Gomez, and offer an improvement over Casey Mcgehee at third base and Yuniesky Betancourt at shortstop. He hit .274 in 45 games for the Brewers.

Hairston was included on the team's playoff roster as the starting third baseman. In Game 4 of the National League Championship Series against the St. Louis Cardinals, he had a clutch double to get the Brewers on the board. Hairston then managed to score by sliding around the tag from Yadier Molina to tie the game. However, he committed one of Milwaukee's four errors in Game 5 that put them behind in the series, which they lost in six games. Overall, Hairston hit .385 with six doubles and four RBI in 11 postseason games.

=== Los Angeles Dodgers ===
On December 5, 2011, the Los Angeles Dodgers signed Hairston to a two-year contract worth $6 million.

On June 1, 2012, Hairston was part of a Dodgers lineup that featured the sons of five former major leaguers (along with Tony Gwynn Jr., Iván DeJesús Jr., Dee Gordon and Scott Van Slyke). This was the first time in Major League history that this had occurred. It was also the first time a starting infield of four major league sons had ever occurred: first baseman Van Slyke, second baseman Hairston, third baseman De Jesus and shortstop Gordon.

On August 22, it was determined that Hairston would need surgery on his left hip. The injury had bothered him for some time before he finally went on the disabled list on August 13. The surgery would sideline him for the rest of the season. In 78 games with the Dodgers in 2012, Hairston hit .273 while playing numerous different positions.

In 2013, Hairston was a key reserve for the Dodgers, playing 28 games at third base, 23 in left field, 4 in right field, 13 at first base and 1 at second base. He struggled with the bat however, hitting just .211.

== Broadcasting career ==
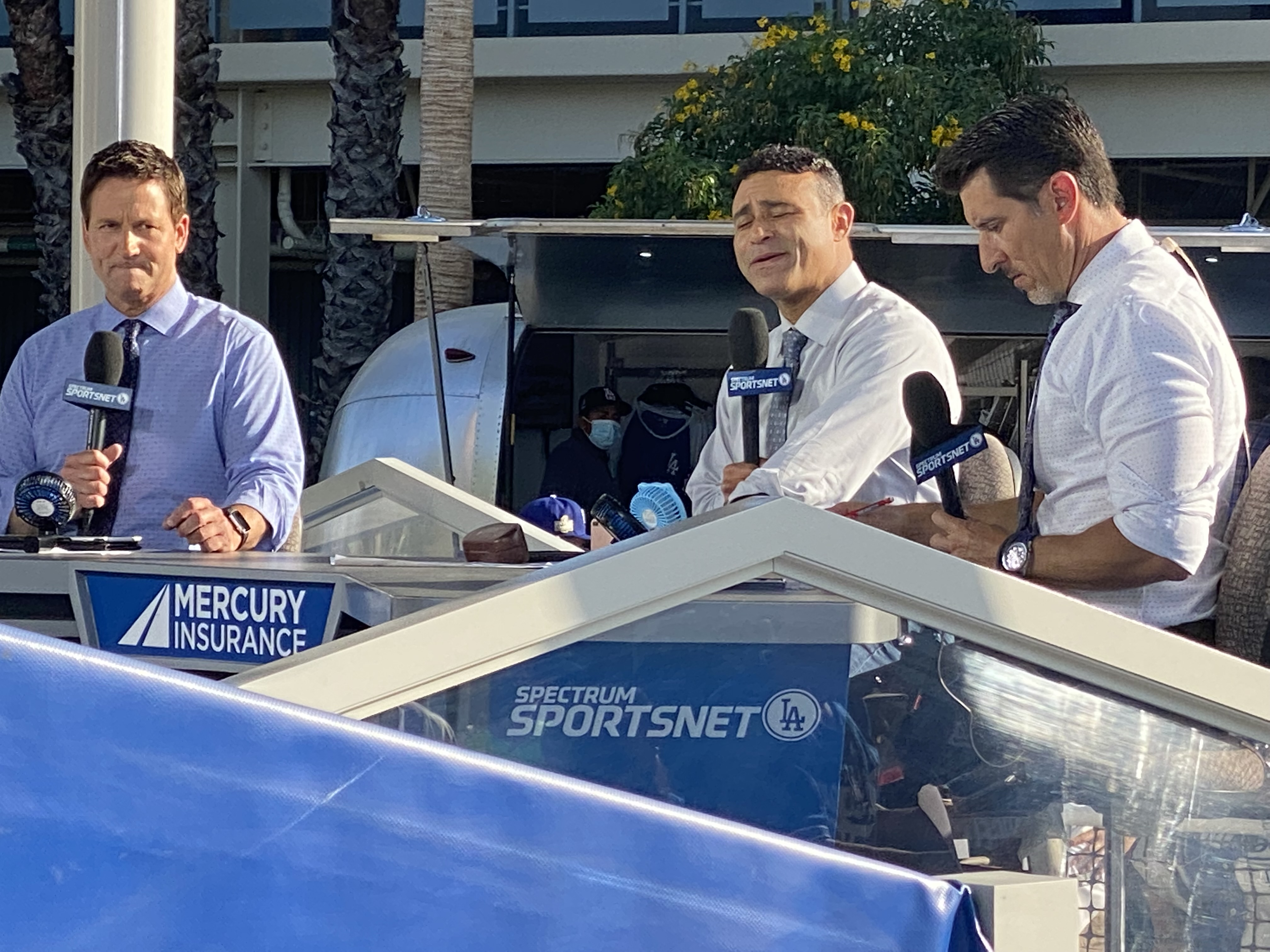
Hairston with John Hartung and Nomar Garciaparra on the SportsNet LA Preshow in 2021

On December 11, 2013, it was announced that Hairston would be retiring as an active player to join the Dodgers pre and post game broadcasting crew on SportsNet LA.

== Performance-enhancing drugs controversy ==
According to a report by Sports Illustrated, Hairston received genotropin, human chorionic gonadotropin (hCG), and clomiphene citrate in 2004. One of Hairston's prescriptions was written by "A. Almarashi." Investigators believe Almarashi is an alias for a Queens, N.Y., doctor stripped of her medical license in 1999. She is awaiting trial on multiple charges after allegedly writing bogus prescriptions for thousands of online customers she never examined.

Hairston denied any connection, stating "Not one time have I taken steroids or anything like that. [ . . .] I would never do anything like that to jeopardize my career or my family's name." He further responded, saying that "I’ve tested in the offseason, tested in spring training, tested during the season, and never tested positive."

On December 13, 2007, he was cited in the Mitchell Report to the Commissioner of Baseball of an Independent Investigation Into the Illegal Use of Steroids and Other Performance Enhancing Substances by Players in Major League Baseball.

== Personal life ==
Hairston is Black and Mexican. His family is descended from the slaves of the wealthy Scotch-Irish Hairston family that owned plantations throughout the United States South.

Jerry's brother Scott Hairston is also a professional baseball player. Their father Jerry Hairston Sr., uncle Johnny Hairston, and grandfather Sam Hairston were also major league players. Several other members of his family played in the minors. Hairston became a Jehovah's Witness in July 2000.

== See also ==
- Third-generation Major League Baseball families
- List of Major League Baseball players named in the Mitchell Report
