= David Bell (baseball) =

American baseball player and coach (born 1972)

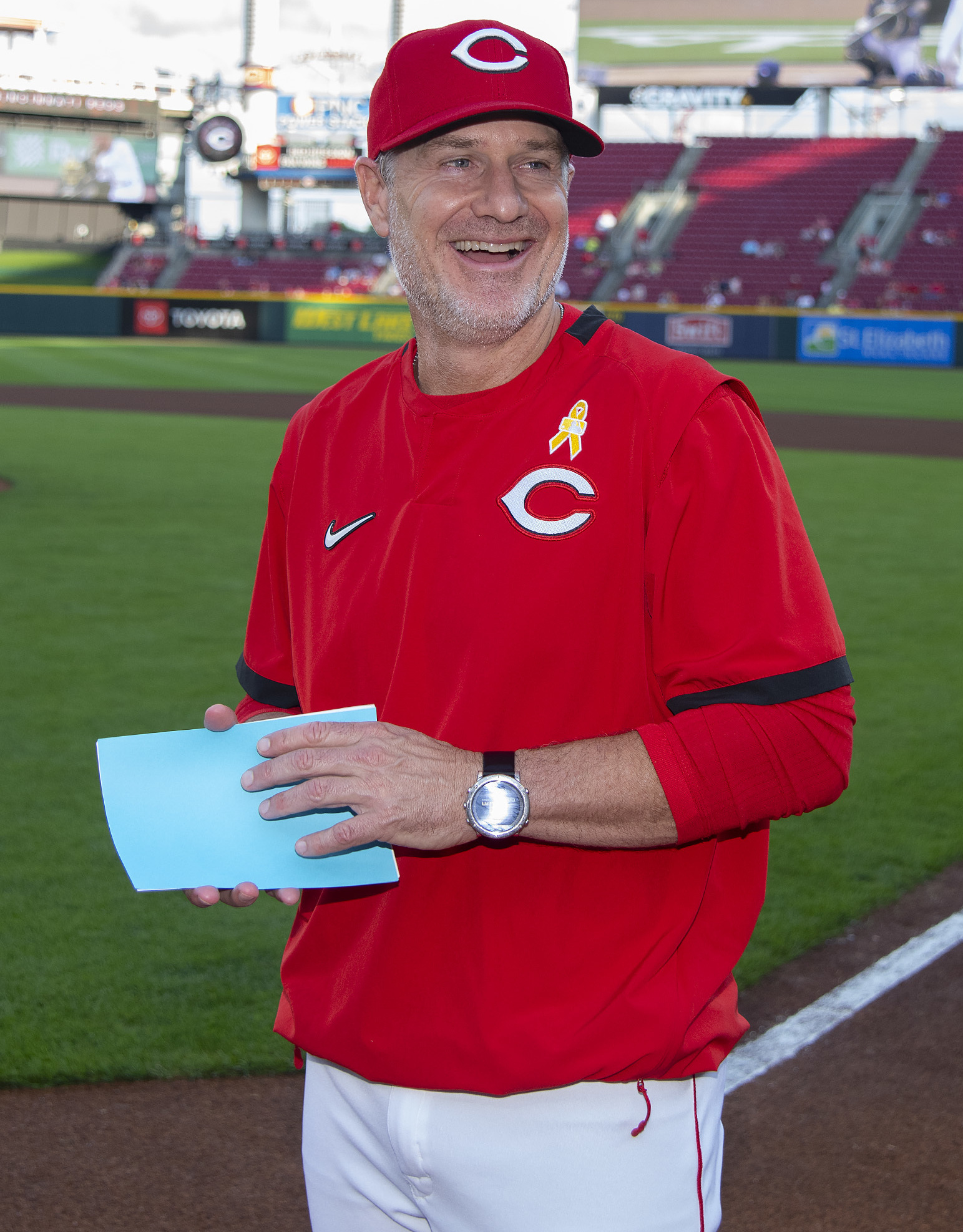
- Bell with the Cincinnati Reds in 2022
- Third baseman / Second baseman / Manager
- Born: September 14, 1972 (age 54); Cincinnati, Ohio, U.S.
- Batted: Right Threw: Right

MLB debut
- May 3, 1995, for the Cleveland Indians

Last MLB appearance
- October 1, 2006, for the Milwaukee Brewers

MLB statistics (through September 22, 2024)
- Batting average: .257
- Home runs: 123
- Runs batted in: 589
- Managerial record: 409–456
- Winning %: .473
- Stats at Baseball Reference
- Managerial record at Baseball Reference

Teams
- As player: Cleveland Indians (1995); St. Louis Cardinals (1995–1998); Cleveland Indians (1998); Seattle Mariners (1998–2001); San Francisco Giants (2002); Philadelphia Phillies (2003–2006); Milwaukee Brewers (2006); As manager: Cincinnati Reds (2019–2024); As coach: Chicago Cubs (2013); St. Louis Cardinals (2014–2017)

David Michael Bell (born September 14, 1972) is an American former professional baseball infielder, coach, and manager who most recently managed the Cincinnati Reds of Major League Baseball (MLB). Over the course of his 12-year MLB playing career, Bell appeared at all four infield positions while playing for the Cleveland Indians, St. Louis Cardinals, Seattle Mariners, San Francisco Giants, Philadelphia Phillies, and Milwaukee Brewers, but played primarily at third and second. Bell made his MLB debut for the Indians in 1995.

After his retirement as an active player, Bell served as a coach for the Chicago Cubs and the St. Louis Cardinals. After managing the Triple-A Louisville Bats and (former) Double-A Carolina Mudcats, both of which are or were in the Reds organization, Bell was chosen as the Reds manager in 2018. Bell spent six seasons with the team before he was fired just before the end of the 2024 season.

The grandson of Gus Bell, son of Buddy Bell, and brother of Mike Bell, David Bell is a member of one of five families to have three generations play in the Major Leagues. In addition, David and Buddy are the fifth father-son pair to serve as major league managers, joining Connie and Earle Mack, George and Dick Sisler, Bob and Joel Skinner, and Bob and Aaron Boone.

== Amateur career ==
Bell attended Moeller High School in Cincinnati, Ohio. Playing for the school's varsity baseball team for three years, where he ranks in the Top Ten in five career categories including doubles and plate appearances. He ranks among the top in Single Season Doubles and Most Doubles in one game. He also played Mickey Mantle and Connie Mack Baseball National Championship teams in 1988 and 1989 respectively as well as leading Moeller to a state championship in 1989. Bell was also a member of the Moeller boys' basketball team. Bell committed to play baseball at the University of Kentucky as a junior.

== Professional career ==
=== Cleveland Indians ===
After the Cleveland Indians selected Bell with their pick in the seventh round (190th overall), Bell decided to forgo his commitment to Kentucky.

Bell made his major league debut on May 3, 1995 as a pinch hitter for Jim Thome and stayed in the game in a defensive replacement. He was optioned to the Buffalo Bisons on May 8, 1995. He hit .272 with eight home runs and 34 RBIs in 70 games.

=== St. Louis Cardinals ===
On July 27, 1995, Bell was traded to the St. Louis Cardinals along with Pepe McNeal and Rick Heiserman for Ken Hill.

=== Return to Cleveland ===
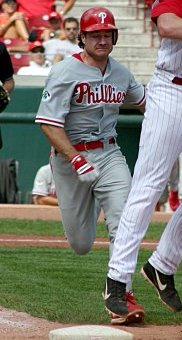
Bell with the Phillies in 2004

On April 14, 1998, Bell was claimed off waivers by the Indians. On April 15, he hit the first inside-the-park home run in Jacobs Field history, and the first for the Indians since 1989.

=== Seattle Mariners ===
On August 31, 1998, Bell was traded to the Seattle Mariners for Joey Cora. Bell was re-signed on December 19, 2001.

=== San Francisco Giants ===
On January 25, 2002, Bell was traded to the San Francisco Giants for Desi Relaford so he could have a chance to play every day. Bell scored the 2002 NLCS winning run for the San Francisco Giants from second on Kenny Lofton's single. Bell was the runner bearing down on home plate in Game 5 of the 2002 World Series when J. T. Snow lifted 3 year old batboy Darren Baker out of harm's way. Near the end of the season, he won the 2002 Willie Mac Award for his spirit and leadership – as voted on by his teammates and coaching staff.

=== Philadelphia Phillies ===
On December 2, 2002, Bell signed a four-year $17 million deal with the Philadelphia Phillies. He made Major League history on June 28, 2004, by joining his grandfather, Gus Bell, as the first grandfather-grandson combination to hit for the cycle.

=== Milwaukee Brewers ===
Bell was traded from the Philadelphia Phillies to the Milwaukee Brewers on July 28, 2006, in a deal that swapped him for minor league pitcher Wilfrido Laureano. The Brewers chose not to re-sign Bell after the 2006 season, and he became a free agent.

== Coaching career ==
On October 31, 2008, the Cincinnati Reds named Bell the manager for their Double-A affiliate, the Carolina Mudcats. Bell spent three seasons as the Mudcats manager. In November 2011 he was named manager of the Reds' Triple-A affiliate Louisville Bats.

On October 23, 2012, the Chicago Cubs named Bell the third base coach for the Major League club.

On December 17, 2013, the St. Louis Cardinals announced hiring Bell as their new assistant hitting coach.

From 2015 through 2017, Bell served as the Cardinals' bench coach. He left the team on October 20, 2017, to become the vice president of player development for the San Francisco Giants.

== Managing career ==
=== Cincinnati Reds ===
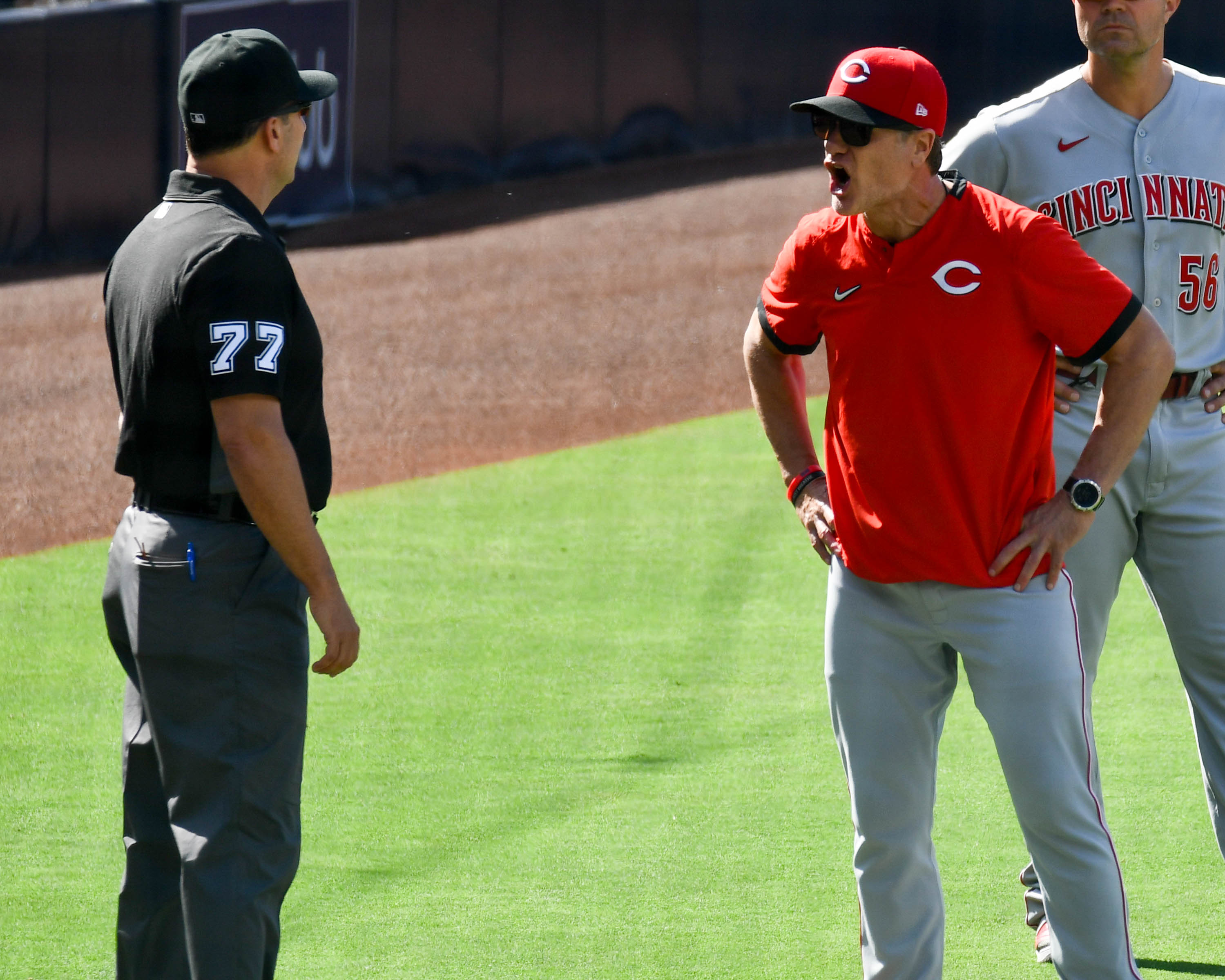
Bell, as the Reds manager, argues with umpire Jim Reynolds during a game in the 2021 season

On October 21, 2018, the Cincinnati Reds announced Bell had been hired as the 63rd manager in franchise history. The contract spans three years with a club option for a fourth.

In an April 7, 2019, game against the Pittsburgh Pirates, Bell was ejected after his role in a bench clearing incident involving Chris Archer, Derek Dietrich, Yasiel Puig, Amir Garrett, Keone Kela, and Felipe Vázquez. This was Bell's first career managerial ejection. Bell received a one-game suspension following the incident on April 9. On July 30, 2019, another bench-clearing mash-up occurred between the Reds and Pirates, with Bell (who had been ejected from the game in the previous half-inning) involved in it. On August 1, 2019, Bell received a 6-game suspension without eligibility to appeal.

On September 22, 2021, Bell agreed to a two-year contract extension with the Reds.

On July 28, 2023, Bell agreed to a contract extension with the Reds through 2026. However, on September 22, 2024, the Reds fired Bell with five games left in the season.

=== Managerial record ===
As of September 22, 2024

Team	Year	Regular season					Postseason			
Team	Year	Games	Won	Lost	Win %	Finish	Won	Lost	Win %	Result
CIN	2019	162	75	87	.463	4th in NL Central	–	–	–	–
CIN	2020	60	31	29	.517	2nd in NL Central	0	2	.000	Lost NLWC (ATL)
CIN	2021	162	83	79	.512	3rd in NL Central	–	–	–	–
CIN	2022	162	62	100	.383	5th in NL Central	–	–	–	–
CIN	2023	162	82	80	.506	3rd in NL Central	–	–	–	–
CIN	2024	157	76	81	.484	4th in NL Central	–	–	–	–
Total		865	409	456	.473		0	2	.000	

== Front office career ==
On November 15, 2024, the Toronto Blue Jays hired Bell to the concurrent roles of vice president of baseball operations and assistant general manager.

== See also ==
- List of Major League Baseball players to hit for the cycle
- List of Major League Baseball players named in the Mitchell Report
- List of second-generation Major League Baseball players
- List of St. Louis Cardinals coaches
- Cleveland Indians all-time roster
- Milwaukee Brewers all-time roster
- Philadelphia Phillies all-time roster
- San Francisco Giants all-time roster
- Seattle Mariners all-time roster
- St. Louis Cardinals all-time roster
- Willie Mac Award

Awards and achievements
Preceded by Jim Thome	Indians' Minor League Player of the Year (the Lou Boudreau Award); 1994	Succeeded by Richie Sexson
Preceded by Daryle Ward	Hitting for the cycle June 28, 2004	Succeeded by Eric Valent
Sporting positions
Preceded by Pat Listach	Chicago Cubs third base coach 2013	Succeeded by Gary Jones
Preceded by Mike Aldrete	St. Louis Cardinals bench coach 2015–2017	Succeeded by Mike Shildt
