= Buddy Bell =

American baseball player and manager (born 1951)

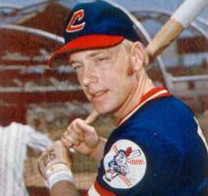
- Bell with the Cleveland Indians, c. 1977
- Third baseman / Manager
- Born: August 27, 1951 (age 75); Pittsburgh, Pennsylvania, U.S.
- Batted: Right Threw: Right

MLB debut
- April 15, 1972, for the Cleveland Indians

Last MLB appearance
- June 17, 1989, for the Texas Rangers

MLB statistics
- Batting average: .279
- Hits: 2,514
- Home runs: 201
- Runs batted in: 1,106
- Managerial record: 519–724
- Winning %: .418
- Stats at Baseball Reference
- Managerial record at Baseball Reference

Teams
- As player: Cleveland Indians (1972–1978); Texas Rangers (1979–1985); Cincinnati Reds (1985–1988); Houston Astros (1988); Texas Rangers (1989); As manager: Detroit Tigers (1996–1998); Colorado Rockies (2000–2002); Kansas City Royals (2005–2007); As coach: Cleveland Indians (1994–1995, 2003–2005)

Career highlights and awards
- 5× All-Star (1973, 1980–1982, 1984); 6× Gold Glove Award (1979–1984); Silver Slugger Award (1984); Texas Rangers Hall of Fame

David Gus "Buddy" Bell (born August 27, 1951) is an American former third baseman and manager in Major League Baseball (MLB) currently serving as vice president and senior advisor to the general manager for the Cincinnati Reds.

After an 18-year career with four teams, most notably the Cleveland Indians, the Texas Rangers, and the Cincinnati Reds, he managed the Detroit Tigers, Colorado Rockies and Kansas City Royals for three seasons each. He served as Vice President/Assistant General Manager for the Chicago White Sox from November 2012 to 2017. He was a five-time MLB All-Star and won six consecutive Rawlings Gold Glove Awards from 1979–1984.

He is the son of outfielder Gus Bell and the father of former third basemen Mike and David Bell, making them one of five families to have three generations play in the Major Leagues. When David was named Reds manager in October 2018, he and Bell became the fourth father-son pair to serve as major league managers, joining George and Dick Sisler, Bob and Joel Skinner, and Bob and Aaron Boone.

== Career ==
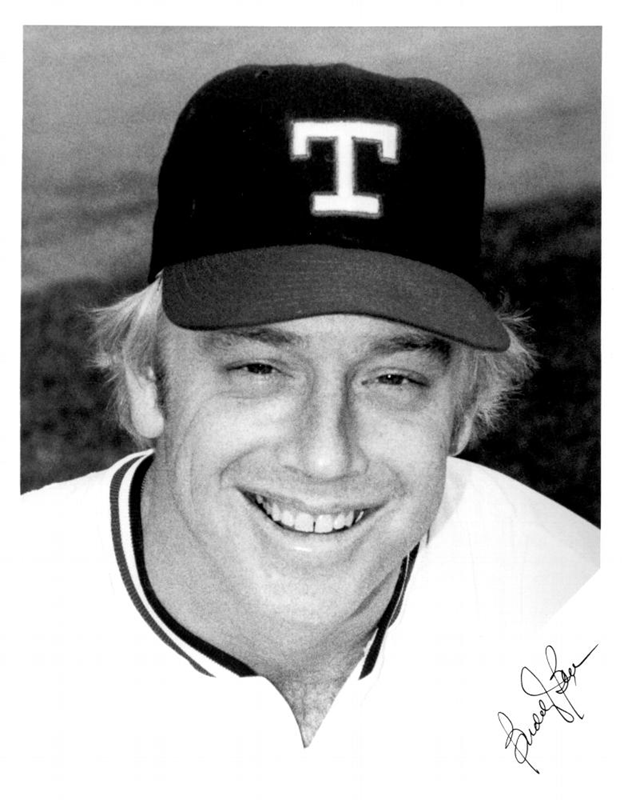
1983 photo of Bell for Texas Rangers

Bell was born while his father was playing for the Pittsburgh Pirates. He attended Moeller High School in Cincinnati. He was drafted in 1969 by the Cleveland Indians and was regarded as a promising prospect from the beginning. He first appeared in the Major Leagues with Cleveland in 1972, appearing mostly in the outfield as a rookie, but afterwards becoming a fixture at third base. The 6 ft 1 in (1.85 m), 185 lb (84 kg) Bell was a solid, but not overpowering, right-handed hitter on a mostly lackluster Indians team. He was named to the All-Star team in 1973.

After the 1978 season, Bell was traded from Cleveland to the Texas Rangers in a position exchange for Toby Harrah (he would play four years for the franchise and coincidentally ended up in the Rangers Hall of Fame just like Bell). Bell enjoyed his best season with the Rangers in 1979, collecting 200 hits, 101 RBI, and his first Gold Glove Award. From 1979 through 1984, Bell won the Gold Glove for third base in the American League. He also won the Silver Slugger Award in 1984. He finished in the top ten in batting average in 1980 and 1984. In the 1984 season, on August 31 against the Milwaukee Brewers, he became the 16th player to hit an "ultimate grand slam", doing so with a walk-off grand slam with two outs in the 9th inning to give them a 7–6 victory; he is the only Ranger to do so in franchise history.

In fielding, Bell was spectacular and often played far off the third base line, taking many base hits from opposing batters. In Total zone runs (a defensive statistic) he is ninth all time (ahead of Willie Mays) and 2nd among all third baseman (behind Brooks Robinson). His Range factor (another defensive stat) is fifth all-time among third baseman. He was in the top 10 in fielding percentage 10 times and finished first three times.

In the 1985 season, Bell reached 2,000 hits for a career, doing so on April 26 against the Toronto Blue Jays. In July of that year, Bell was sent to the Cincinnati Reds, where his father had been a popular player in the 1950s. He responded with two more solid years playing for second place teams under Pete Rose. In 1986, Bell hit a career-high 20 home runs. In the 1988 season, he began to fade and was traded to the Houston Astros. One highlight from his Astros tenure was being awarded the Lou Gehrig Memorial Award (as sponsored by the Phi Delta Theta International Fraternity to honor a player for their contributions in philanthropy and the community), making him the first player in franchise history to receive the honor. Bell was released in December and returned with the Rangers before the 1989 season, in which he appeared sparingly. On June 24, he was placed on the voluntarily retired list, ending his career. He later went public that year about his lifelong battle with epilepsy, having being diagnosed at the age of 23 that resulted in treatment with medication.

In an 18-year career, Bell posted a .279 batting average with 2,514 hits, 201 home runs and 1,106 RBI in 2,405 games. He won six Gold Gloves and made five All-Star Game appearances. At the time he retired, he was one of only eleven players to have played at least 50 percent of their games at third base to have hit for 200 home runs and drive in 1,000 runs. He still ranks in the top ten for primary third basemen in hits as of 2026. He was also one of just 65 players at the time with 2,500 hits in MLB history. In sabermetrics, Bell recorded a Wins above replacement (WAR) of 66.3 while having defensive WAR of 23.8, which ranks highly among players in his position. At the time of his retirement, only three other players had played more games than Bell who never reached the postseason and no player has played more games since Bell that did not reach the postseason.

== Post-playing career ==
Following retirement, Bell worked for several years as a coach for the Reds, and from 1994-1995 for the Indians. He managed the Detroit Tigers from 1996–98. He then managed the Colorado Rockies from 2000 through part of 2002 when he was fired in April after a 6–16 start. As a manager both for Detroit and Colorado, Bell compiled a 184–277 record. Bell managed the American team in the 1999 Pan American Games. They reached the gold medal match, where they lost to Cuba; the result earned the United States a qualifying spot for the 2000 Olympic Games.

In November 2002, Bell returned to coaching for the Cleveland Indians. On May 31, 2005, the Kansas City Royals hired Bell as their manager, three weeks after Tony Peña resigned. Bell won his first four games as a manager, becoming only the second Royals manager (after Whitey Herzog) to do so and guiding the Royals to their first four-game winning streak since 2003.

Bell took a medical leave of absence from the team late in the 2006 season that required surgery. On August 1, 2007, Bell announced that he would not be returning to the Royals bench at the conclusion of the 2007 season, with Bell stating, “I had to make a choice between managing and my family, and to me that’s a no-brainer.” He stated that he would join the team front office in 2008 as a senior adviser to general manager Dayton Moore. However, he instead found a new position with the Chicago White Sox. In 2008, he was hired by the Chicago White Sox to serve as their minor league director; he rose to director of player development the following year. In early 2012, he was promoted to vice president of player development and special assignments and in November was promoted by new GM Rick Hahn to vice president/assistant general manager. In 2015, he was awarded the Sheldon "Chief" Bender Award by Minor League Baseball for his "distinguished service who has been instrumental in player development."

In October 2017, he asked and received permission to interview for the Cincinnati Reds. He was subsequently hired that month by the Reds to work in the front office as vice president and senior advisor to the GM.

== Managerial record ==
Team	Year	Regular season					Postseason			
Team	Year	Games	Won	Lost	Win %	Finish	Won	Lost	Win %	Result
DET	1996	162	53	109	.327	5th in AL East	–	–	–	–
DET	1997	162	79	83	.488	3rd in AL East	–	–	–	–
DET	1998	137	52	85	.380	Fired	–	–	–	–
DET total		461	184	277	.399		–	–	–	
COL	2000	162	82	80	.506	4th in NL West	–	–	–	–
COL	2001	162	73	89	.451	5th in NL West	–	–	–	–
COL	2002	22	6	16	.273	Fired	–	–	–	–
COL total		346	161	185	.465		–	–	–	
KC	2005	112	43	69	.384	5th in AL Central	–	–	–	–
KC	2006	162	62	100	.383	5th in AL Central	–	–	–	–
KC	2007	162	69	93	.426	5th in AL Central	–	–	–	–
KC total		436	174	262	.399		–	–	–	
Total		1,243	519	724	.418		–	–	–	

== See also ==
- Houston Astros award winners and league leaders
- List of Major League Baseball career hits leaders
- List of Major League Baseball career doubles leaders
- List of Major League Baseball career runs scored leaders
- List of Major League Baseball career runs batted in leaders
- List of Major League Baseball ultimate grand slams
- Third-generation Major League Baseball families
- List of second-generation Major League Baseball players

Sporting positions
Preceded by	Cleveland Indians infield coach 1994–1995	Succeeded by Toby Harrah
Preceded by Jeff Datz	Cleveland Indians bench coach 2003–2005	Succeeded by Robby Thompson
