= Bret Boone =

American baseball player (born 1969)

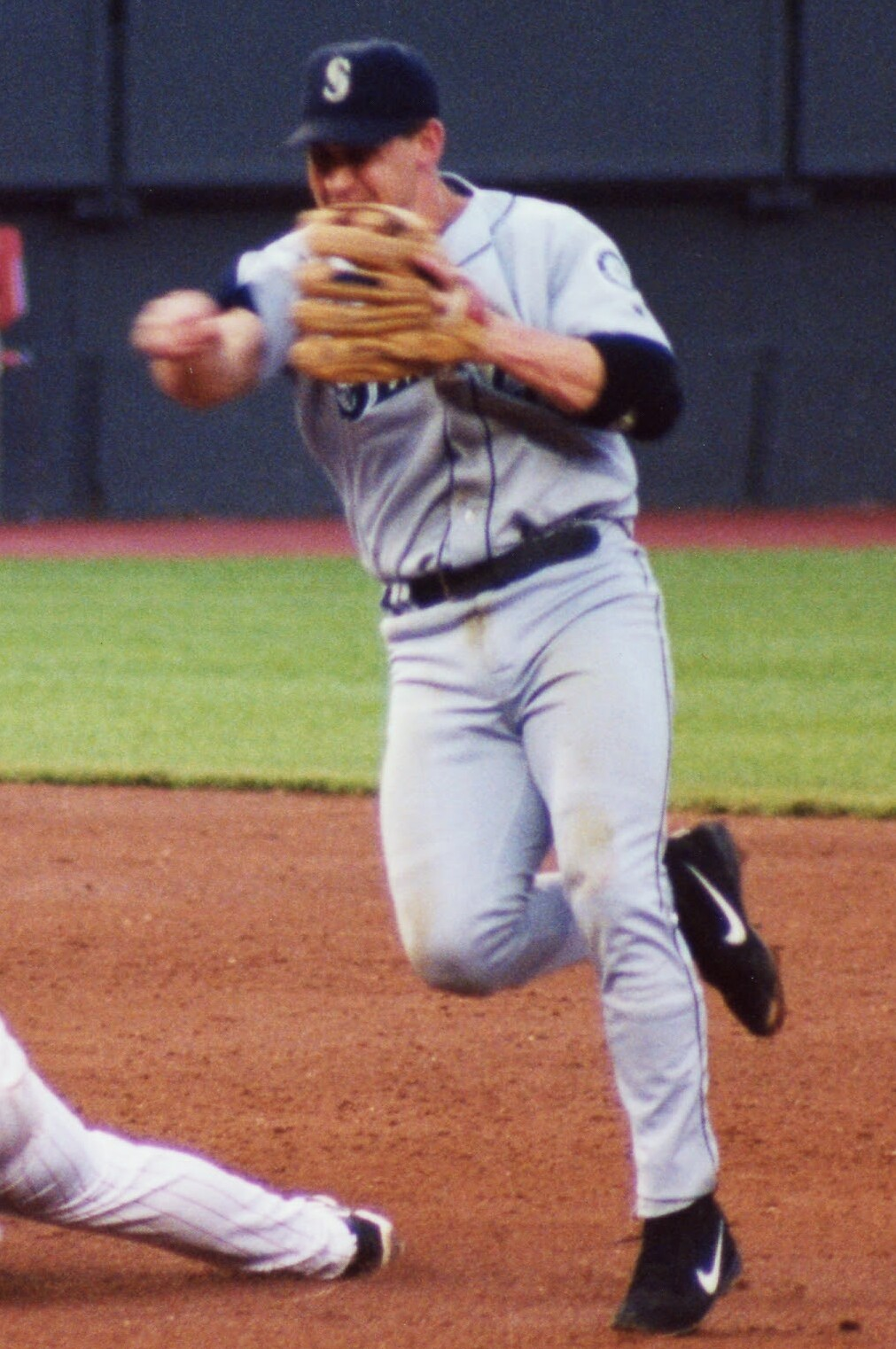
- Boone with the Seattle Mariners in 2002
- Second baseman
- Born: April 6, 1969 (age 57); El Cajon, California, U.S.
- Batted: Right Threw: Right

MLB debut
- August 19, 1992, for the Seattle Mariners

Last MLB appearance
- July 31, 2005, for the Minnesota Twins

MLB statistics
- Batting average: .266
- Home runs: 252
- Runs batted in: 1,021
- Stats at Baseball Reference

Teams
- As player: Seattle Mariners (1992–1993); Cincinnati Reds (1994–1998); Atlanta Braves (1999); San Diego Padres (2000); Seattle Mariners (2001–2005); Minnesota Twins (2005); As coach: Texas Rangers (2025)

Career highlights and awards
- 3× All-Star (1998, 2001, 2003); 4× Gold Glove Award (1998, 2002–2004); 2× Silver Slugger Award (2001, 2003); AL RBI leader (2001)

Bret Robert Boone (born April 6, 1969) is an American former professional baseball second baseman who played in Major League Baseball (MLB) for the Seattle Mariners, Cincinnati Reds, Atlanta Braves, San Diego Padres, Seattle Mariners and Minnesota Twins. During his career, Boone was a three-time All-Star, four-time Gold Glove winner, and two-time Silver Slugger Award winner. He is a third-generation professional athlete. His brother is Aaron Boone, manager of the New York Yankees.

== Personal life ==
Boone was born in El Cajon, California, to Susan G. Roel and major league player and manager Bob Boone. He is also the grandson of major leaguer Ray Boone and brother of former major leaguer and current New York Yankees manager Aaron Boone, as well as a descendant of pioneer Daniel Boone. As a child, Boone hung out in the Phillies clubhouse with Pete Rose Jr., his brother Aaron, Ryan Luzinski, and Mark McGraw.

He is a graduate of El Dorado High School in Placentia, California. Boone attended the University of Southern California and played for the team, but left after his junior year of college when he was drafted by the Seattle Mariners in the fifth round. In 2016 Boone released an autobiography, Home Game: Big-League Stories from My Life in Baseball's First Family.

== Professional career ==
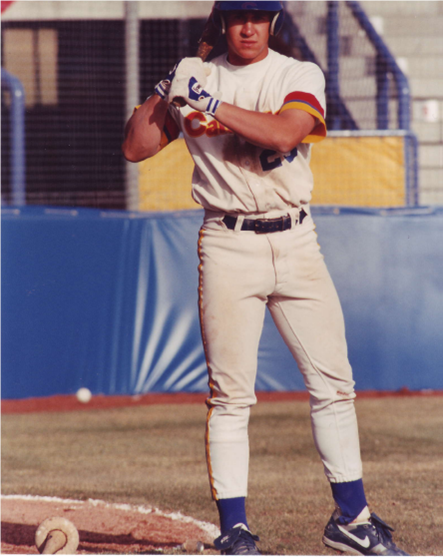
Boone was a member of the AAA Calgary Cannons in 1992.

In 1992, Boone became the first-ever third-generation big-leaguer in baseball history. As a member of an All-Star family, he is the son of Bob Boone, a catcher for the Philadelphia Phillies, California Angels, and Kansas City Royals (1972–1990) and later a manager with the Royals and Cincinnati Reds; his brother Aaron was a third baseman who has played with the Reds, New York Yankees, Cleveland Indians, Florida Marlins, and Houston Astros, and is now the manager of the Yankees. His grandfather Ray Boone was an infielder for the Indians, Detroit Tigers, Chicago White Sox, Kansas City Athletics, Milwaukee Braves, and Boston Red Sox (1948–1960).

=== Seattle Mariners ===
Boone started his playing career with the Seattle Mariners, where he set the club record for home runs in a season by second baseman in 1993 (12 in 76 games) but was traded that same year to the Cincinnati Reds along with Erik Hanson.

=== Cincinnati Reds, Atlanta Braves, and San Diego Padres ===
Boone spent the next four seasons with Cincinnati as their everyday second baseman. In his final year with the team, Boone earned his first All-Star Game appearance as a replacement for the injured Sammy Sosa. For his defensive play that year, he was also awarded his first Gold Glove Award.

On the last day of that 1998 season, the Reds helped him make baseball history by starting the only infield ever composed of two sets of brothers - first baseman Stephen Larkin, second baseman Bret Boone, shortstop Barry Larkin, and third baseman Aaron Boone.

An offseason trade sent Boone to the Atlanta Braves, where he contributed to the fifth of what would become eleven consecutive NL East division titles (and eighth of fourteen consecutive titles including three NL West titles before the division realignment) on their way to a World Series appearance. During their postseason run, Boone posted a .370/369/.481 slash line that included a 7 for 14 World Series performance where the Braves ultimately lost in a sweep by the New York Yankees.

Another winter trade sent Boone to the San Diego Padres for the 2000 season, after which he entered free agency.

=== Return to Mariners ===
In 2001, Boone returned to the Mariners, the organization with which he came up from 1990 to 1993. Now an All-Star, and having averaged 21 home runs a year from 1998 through 2000, twice reaching a career high in doubles (at 38, in 1998 and 1999), Boone's superior play continued as he led the league in runs batted in (141), while producing a batting average of .331. He also broke the Mariners' team record of home runs for a second baseman with 37, while also hitting 37 doubles.

Boone started in the All-Star Game at Safeco Field, received a Silver Slugger Award, and finished third in the AL MVP voting. His Mariners paced the league with a record 116 wins, earning the AL West championship and advancing to the ALCS, tying the all-time team record for wins in a season with the 1906 Chicago Cubs.

The following year, Boone won a Gold Glove Award for his defense and continued to show the power he had demonstrated the previous years, hitting 24 home runs with 34 doubles. On May 2, 2002, Boone and teammate Mike Cameron became the first teammates to each hit two home runs in a single inning, doing so in the first inning against the White Sox. With local media and behind the scenes, he was famous for his humorous behavior. Boone took up three lockers, as Erick Walker notes, "one for him, another with a nameplate above that read 'Boone's friend' and a third with a nameplate that read 'Boone's friend's friend' that was scattered with about 100 bats."

=== Minnesota Twins ===
He was designated for assignment by the Mariners on July 3, 2005, and later traded on July 11 to Minnesota for cash and a player to be named later (minor league pitcher Andy Baldwin). Minnesota released Boone on August 1 after only 14 games, where the second baseman struggled with a .221 batting average, with seven home runs and 37 RBIs in 88 games for the Mariners and Twins.

=== New York Mets ===
On January 4, 2006, Boone signed a minor league contract with the New York Mets. He received an invitation to spring training, but on March 1, only a few days into spring training, he announced his initial retirement from baseball, citing a lack of passion for the game.

=== Washington Nationals ===
On February 18, 2008, Boone came out of retirement and signed a minor league contract with the Washington Nationals. At first he was assigned to the minor league camp, but after five days, he was invited to the team's major league spring training camp. On March 21, 2008, Boone was reassigned to minor league camp after hitting .189 and began the season with the Columbus Clippers, the Nationals Triple-A affiliate. He hoped to get signed by a major league club, and left the Clippers in late April to work out on his own. However, on May 28, he once again announced his retirement. On March 9, 2010, he was named manager of the Victoria Seals of the Golden Baseball League. On May 27, 2010, after managing just four games, the Seals announced Boone was leaving the team permanently to deal with "family matters".

=== Legacy ===
Bret Boone had his best years as a Seattle Mariner, where he is still a fan favorite. He finished his career with a .266 batting average, 252 home runs, and 1,021 RBIs in 1,780 games in 14 MLB seasons. He was a three-time All-Star and four-time Gold Glove winner, and participated in two Home Run Derbies.

==== Steroid controversy ====
Jose Canseco, in his book Juiced, accused Boone of steroid use, saying that in a 2001 spring training game, he was stunned at Boone's physique, and the two chatted about what Boone was taking. However, Boone has denied taking steroids, or having any such conversation with Canseco, pointing out that he never played against Canseco during the 2001 spring training. In fact, Canseco never reached second base in any of the five games the Mariners played against the Angels, where the conversation is alleged to have occurred. Canseco was cut by the Angels on March 28.

== Coaching career ==
On May 5, 2025, Boone announced on his podcast that he had been hired as hitting coach for the Texas Rangers. After serving in that role for the 2025 Rangers, Boone did not return in 2026.

== Related links ==
- List of NL Gold Glove winners at second base
- List of Major League Baseball career home run leaders
- List of second-generation MLB players
- List of Major League Baseball career runs batted in leaders
- List of Major League Baseball annual runs batted in leaders

== See also ==
- Third-generation Major League Baseball families
- List of Major League Baseball annual runs batted in leaders
- List of Silver Slugger Award winners at second base
- List of Gold Glove Award winners at second base

Sporting positions
| Preceded by Tim Hyers | Texas Rangers hitting coach 2025 | Succeeded by Alex Cintrón |
