= Mike Bell (third baseman) =

American baseball player and coach (1974–2021)

- Third baseman
- Born: December 7, 1974; Cincinnati, Ohio, U.S.
- Died: March 26, 2021 (aged 46); Chandler, Arizona, U.S.
- Batted: Right Threw: Right

MLB debut
- July 20, 2000, for the Cincinnati Reds

Last MLB appearance
- October 1, 2000, for the Cincinnati Reds

MLB statistics
- Batting average: .222
- Home runs: 2
- Runs batted in: 4
- Stats at Baseball Reference

Teams
- As player: Cincinnati Reds (2000); As coach: Minnesota Twins (2020)

Michael John Bell (December 7, 1974 – March 26, 2021) was an American professional baseball third baseman and coach. He played in Major League Baseball (MLB) for the Cincinnati Reds, and was the bench coach of the Minnesota Twins during the 2020 season. He was the brother of David Bell, son of Buddy Bell and grandson of Gus Bell.

== Baseball career ==
Bell attended Moeller High School in Cincinnati, Ohio. The Texas Rangers selected Bell in the first round of the 1993 Major League Baseball draft. He played in Minor League Baseball from 1993 to 2005. In 2000, he played in Major League Baseball for the Cincinnati Reds. With the Reds, Bell batted .222 with two home runs and four runs batted in in 19 games.

In 2007, Bell was named the manager of the Yakima Bears, a minor league affiliate of the Arizona Diamondbacks. He managed the Visalia Rawhide in 2008 and 2009. Bell then served as the director of player development for the Diamondbacks from 2011 through 2016 and as vice president of player development from 2017 through 2019.

On December 17, 2019, the Minnesota Twins named Bell to their coaching staff for the 2020 season, replacing Derek Shelton, who left to manage the Pittsburgh Pirates.

== Personal life ==
Bell and his wife, Kelly, had three children. One of his children, Luke, is currently a pitcher in the Chicago White Sox organization. His father, Buddy Bell, grandfather, Gus Bell, and brother, David Bell, all played in the major leagues.

Bell fell ill in July 2020, and an examination in January 2021 discovered tumors on his kidneys. He underwent a procedure on January 28, and went on indefinite leave from the Twins, working remotely from his Phoenix, Arizona home. Bell died on March 26, 2021, less than two months after his diagnosis.

== See also ==
- Third-generation Major League Baseball families
- List of second-generation Major League Baseball players
- List of Major League Baseball players named in the Mitchell Report
