= Gus Bell =

American baseball player (1928–1995)

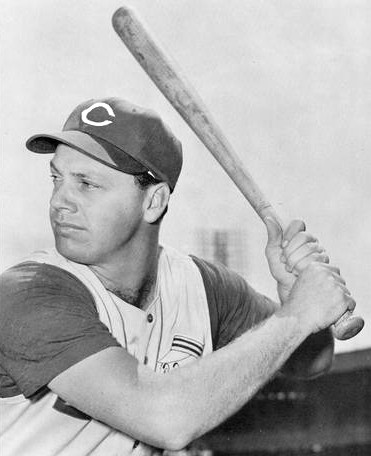
- Bell in 1961
- Outfielder
- Born: November 15, 1928; Louisville, Kentucky, U.S.
- Died: May 7, 1995 (aged 66); Montgomery, Ohio, U.S.
- Batted: Left Threw: Right

MLB debut
- May 30, 1950, for the Pittsburgh Pirates

Last MLB appearance
- May 1, 1964, for the Milwaukee Braves

MLB statistics
- Batting average: .281
- Home runs: 206
- Runs batted in: 942
- Stats at Baseball Reference

Teams
- Pittsburgh Pirates (1950–1952); Cincinnati Redlegs / Reds (1953–1961); New York Mets (1962); Milwaukee Braves (1962–1964)

Career highlights and awards
- 4× All-Star (1953, 1954, 1956, 1957); Cincinnati Reds Hall of Fame

David Russell "Gus" Bell Jr. (November 15, 1928 – May 7, 1995) was an American professional baseball player and scout. He played in Major League Baseball as a center fielder from 1950 to 1964, most prominently as a member of the Cincinnati Reds, where he was a four-time All-Star and a member of Cincinnati's 1961 National League pennant-winning team. Bell had 100 or more runs batted in four times during his Reds career and batted .292 or better six times.

Bell also played for the Pittsburgh Pirates, New York Mets and Milwaukee Braves. He was inducted into the Cincinnati Reds Hall of Fame in 1964.

== Family ==
A native of Louisville, Kentucky, and graduate of Bishop Benedict Joseph Flaget High School, Bell was nicknamed "Gus" as a youngster because he was a fan of longtime MLB player Gus Mancuso.

Gus Bell was the oldest member of a rare three-generation major league family. His son Buddy has been a third baseman, coach, manager and front-office executive in the majors since 1972, and his grandsons, former MLB infielders David and Mike, became coaches, managers or player development officials after their playing careers.

The elder Bell wore uniform #25 during his nine years with the Cincinnati Reds (known as the "Redlegs" from 1953 to 1958). Buddy Bell wore 25 in tribute to his father during much of his playing and managing career, including his 1985–88 tenure with the Reds. David Bell, who managed the Reds from 2019 to 2024, carried on the tradition when he took Cincinnati uniform #25 as well.

== Career ==
=== Pittsburgh Pirates ===
Bell was 18 years old when he made his pro debut in the Pirates' farm system in 1947. In both 1948 and 1949, he batted over .300, and led the Eastern League in hits during the latter season. A torrid start to his 1950 season at Triple-A Indianapolis — he hit .400 with 66 hits in 38 games — earned him a call-up to Pittsburgh. He debuted on May 30 playing both ends of a Memorial Day doubleheader against the St. Louis Cardinals at Forbes Field, and went four for ten; then, the following day, against the Boston Braves, he maintained the same pace, with two hits in five at bats. He ended his rookie season with a .282 batting mark in 111 games as the Bucs' starting rightfielder.

Bell played for the Pirates through 1952, leading the National League in triples with 12 in 1951, and driving in 89 runs. On June 4, 1951, he hit for the cycle against the Philadelphia Phillies. In 2004, his grandson David hit for the cycle; Gus Bell and David Bell are the only grandfather-grandson duo in major league history to hit for the cycle.

But a terrible 1952 campaign, during which the Pirates compiled a franchise-worst 42–112 record and Bell slumped to a .250 batting mark in 131 games, led to his October 14, 1952, trade to the Cincinnati Reds for three players.

=== Cincinnati Redlegs/Reds ===
During his nine years with Cincinnati from 1953 through 1961, Bell achieved success and popularity. A four-time NL All-Star selection (1953–54, 1956–57), he enjoyed his best seasons in 1953, when he hit .300 with 30 home runs and 105 RBI, and in 1955, batting .308 with 27 home runs and 104 RBI. Four times, he recorded more than 100 RBI in a season and hit 103 home runs from 1953 to 1956.

Bell hit home runs in three consecutive at-bats on May 29, 1956. During the 1956 season, Bell, Ted Kluszewski and Bob Thurman became the second trio of teammates each to have three-home run games in the same season. The feat had been accomplished by the Brooklyn Dodgers in 1950 (Duke Snider, Roy Campanella and Tommy Brown) and subsequently was equaled by the Cleveland Indians in 1987 (Cory Snyder, Joe Carter and Brook Jacoby).

In 1957, Bell and six of his teammates – Ed Bailey, Johnny Temple, Roy McMillan, Don Hoak, Wally Post and Frank Robinson — were voted to the National League All-Star starting lineup, the result of a ballot stuffing campaign by Cincinnati fans. Bell remained on the team as a reserve, but Post was taken off altogether due to injury. Bell and Post were replaced as starters by Hank Aaron and Willie Mays. Bell entered the game as a pinch hitter for Robinson in the seventh and drove in both Mays and Bailey with a double against Early Wynn.

Bell's last season as a regular outfielder was 1960, when he started 122 of the Reds' 154 games. In 1961, his final year with Cincinnati, he was a part-time player (starting 54 games) on the Reds' first pennant-winning team in 21 years. In the 1961 World Series, Bell was called on to pinch hit in Games 3, 4 and 5 and went hitless in three at bats. One day after the conclusion of the Fall Classic, won by the New York Yankees four games to one, Bell was the eighth overall selection in the primary phase of the National League expansion draft by the New York Mets.

=== New York Mets ===
Bell started the 1962 season with the Mets, and on April 11, 1962, he was the starting right fielder in the Mets' inaugural game. He became the first base runner in Mets history after hitting a single in the second inning of an 11–4 loss to the Cardinals. But he collected only 15 hits in 101 at bats (.149) in 30 games with the expansion club.

=== Milwaukee Braves ===
On May 21, 1962, Bell was sent to Milwaukee to complete a November 1961 transaction in which the Mets acquired veteran slugger Frank Thomas. He batted .285 in 79 games (with 53 games started as an outfielder) to raise his 1962 season average to .241. But he had only six more MLB at bats as a Brave in 1963–64 until he was released on May 12, 1964, during the roster cutdown then in effect in the major leagues.

== Post-playing career ==
Bell was inducted into the Cincinnati Reds Hall of Fame in 1964. After his playing career, he worked for an auto dealership, ran a temporary employment agency, and was a scout for the Cleveland Indians and Texas Rangers. Bell died in May 1995, at Bethesda North Hospital near Cincinnati, at the age of 66; he had recently had a heart attack. He was survived by seven children and 36 grandchildren.

On what would have been Bell's 83rd birthday – November 15, 2011 – he was inducted into the Louisville Catholic Sports Hall of Fame, with a speech by his grandson David.

== See also ==
- List of Major League Baseball players to hit for the cycle
- List of Major League Baseball annual triples leaders
- List of second-generation Major League Baseball players

Achievements
Preceded by Hoot Evers	Hitting for the cycle June 4, 1951	Succeeded by Larry Doby
