= Bob Boone =

American baseball player and manager (1947–2026)

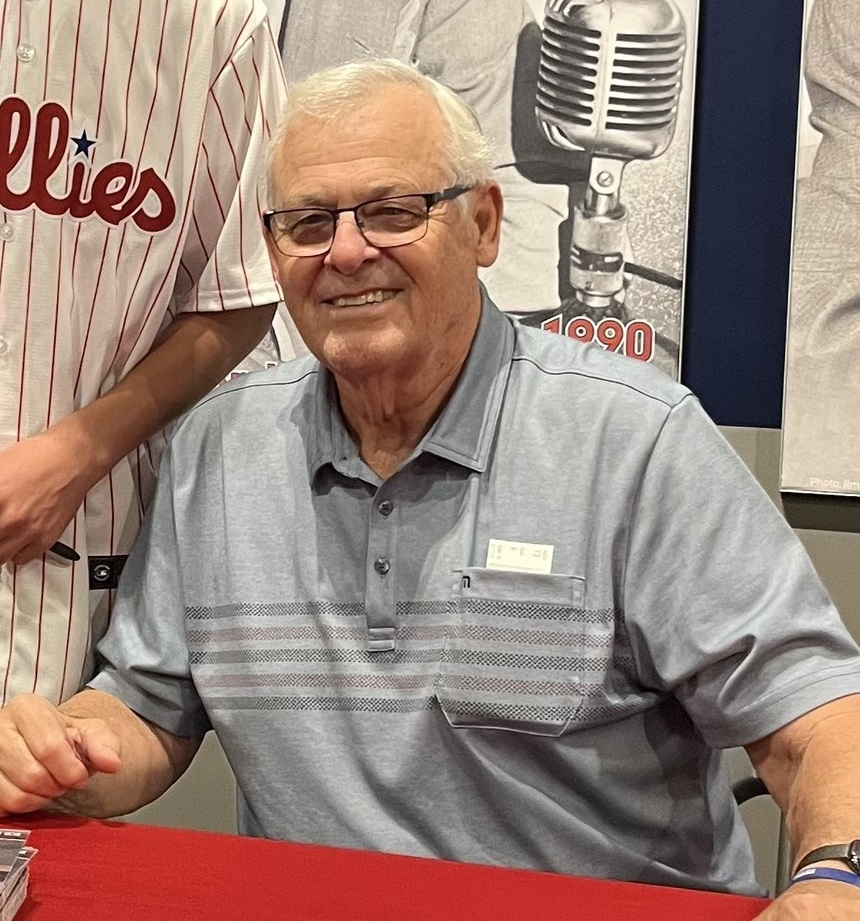
- Boone in 2023
- Catcher / Manager
- Born: November 19, 1947; San Diego, California, U.S.
- Died: November 9, 2026 (aged 78)
- Batted: Right Threw: Right

MLB debut
- September 10, 1972, for the Philadelphia Phillies

Last MLB appearance
- September 27, 1990, for the Kansas City Royals

MLB statistics
- Batting average: .254
- Home runs: 105
- Runs batted in: 826
- Managerial record: 371–444
- Winning %: .455
- Stats at Baseball Reference
- Managerial record at Baseball Reference

Teams
- As player: Philadelphia Phillies (1972–1981); California Angels (1982–1988); Kansas City Royals (1989–1990); As manager: Kansas City Royals (1995–1997); Cincinnati Reds (2001–2003)

Career highlights and awards
- 4× All-Star (1976, 1978, 1979, 1983); World Series champion (1980); 7× Gold Glove Award (1978, 1979, 1982, 1986–1989); Philadelphia Phillies Wall of Fame

Robert Raymond Boone (November 19, 1947 – November 9, 2026) was an American professional baseball player and manager in Major League Baseball (MLB). He played as a catcher for 19 seasons with three teams from 1972 to 1990, primarily for the Philadelphia Phillies. A sixth-round draft pick in the 1969 MLB draft, he was converted from third base to catcher by the Phillies and rose to the full-time job in 1973, where he finished third place for Rookie of the Year. A regular .254 hitter that played at least 100 games in 15 of his 19 years (with all but 39 games played at catcher), Boone was a four-time selection to the All-Star Game and a seven-time Gold Glove Award winner, which included four straight from 1986 to 1989 when he was in his late thirties.

He featured in seven postseasons from 1976 to 1986, most notably with 1980 when he hit .314 with eleven hits as the Phillies won the World Series for their first championship in franchise history. At the time of his retirement from playing, Boone held the record for most career games caught with 2,225.

Boone was part of baseball's first three-generation family, as he was the son of Ray Boone and father of Bret Boone and Aaron Boone, who all played in MLB.

== Early life and college career ==
Born in San Diego, California, Boone was the son of MLB player Ray Boone.

Boone played third base and pitched for the Stanford Cardinal. In his senior season, he batted .311 with seven home runs, while pitching 85 innings with a 9-1 record and 1.27 ERA. Boone, a member of the Zeta Psi fraternity, graduated with degree in psychology. Boone is a member of the Stanford Athletics Hall of Fame.

== Professional career ==
1974 photocard of Boone for Philadelphia Phillies

=== Philadelphia Phillies ===
Boone was drafted by the Philadelphia Phillies in the sixth round (126th overall) of the 1969 amateur draft. As a third baseman, his path to the majors was blocked by fellow prospect Mike Schmidt, so he was converted to a catcher (his father, originally a catcher was made a third baseman in the majors).

Boone was brought to the majors in late 1972. That offseason, the Phillies traded away catchers Tim McCarver and John Bateman, clearing the way for Boone to become the Phillies regular catcher in 1973. Boone responded by hitting .261 with 10 home runs, finishing third in the NL Rookie of the Year balloting.

While Boone never had excellent hitting numbers, he was an excellent defensive catcher, committing only eight errors and allowing only three passed balls in the 1977 season. Boone made the National League All-Star team three times in a Phillies uniform and helped the team win the 1980 World Series. In 1981, he batted .211/.279/.295.

In 2005, Boone was inducted into the Philadelphia Baseball Wall of Fame.

=== California Angels ===
1984 photo of Boone for California Angels

In 1982, the Phillies decided to trade the veteran catcher to the California Angels following an unproductive year from Boone and also as a possible retaliation for Boone's key role in leading the players in negotiations during the 1981 Major League Baseball strike. Boone rebounded by throwing out 21 of the first 34 steal attempts and helping the Angels to the AL West title. In 1983, he made his fourth and final All-Star appearance.

On September 30, 1984, Boone caught Mike Witt's perfect game.

=== Kansas City Royals ===
As a free agent, Boone signed with the Kansas City Royals, but a broken finger in 1990 led to his retirement at age 42 following his shortened season, in which he batted .239/.336/.265.

Boone was a career .254/.315/.346 hitter with 1,838 hits, 105 home runs (HR) and 826 runs batted in (RBI), in 2,264 games. He was selected an All-Star in 1976, 1978–79, and 1983. Boone was one of the top defensive catchers of his era, winning seven Gold Glove awards. He caught 2,225 games in a 19-year big league career, a record that lasted for three years until Carlton Fisk passed him (the record currently is held by Iván Rodríguez, with 2,427). Boone caught 117 shutouts during his career, ranking him tied for 13th all-time in 2010 among major league catchers. He threw out Rickey Henderson 15 out of 26 attempted steals, the highest percentage by any catcher on record.

== Managerial career ==
In 1990, just after Boone retired as a player, a group trying to bring an MLB franchise to Orlando (called the Orlando SunRays) hired him to be its first manager. The job was contingent on Orlando being awarded a National League franchise to begin play in 1993; the NL instead chose Miami and Denver.

Boone returned to the Royals in 1995 as the team's manager but was let go during the 1997 season after a third straight sub-.500 season. In 2001, he was hired to be the skipper of the Cincinnati Reds, replacing Jack McKeon. However, after another two and a half sub-.500 seasons, the Reds replaced Boone with Ray Knight, on July 28, 2003.

=== Managerial record ===
Team	Year	Regular season					Postseason			
Team	Year	Games	Won	Lost	Win %	Finish	Won	Lost	Win %	Result
KC	1995	144	70	74	.486	2nd in AL Central	–	–	–	–
KC	1996	161	75	86	.466	5th in AL Central	–	–	–	–
KC	1997	82	36	46	.439	(fired)	–	–	–	–
KC total		387	181	206	.468		0	0	–	
CIN	2001	162	66	96	.407	5th in NL Central	–	–	–	–
CIN	2002	162	78	84	.481	3rd in NL Central	–	–	–	–
CIN	2003	104	46	58	.442	(fired)	–	–	–	–
CIN total		428	190	238	.444		0	0	–	
Total		815	371	444	.455		0	0	–	

== Personal life and death ==
Boone and his family are descendants of American pioneer Daniel Boone. Boone and his wife, Susan, have three sons; two of his sons, Aaron Boone and Bret Boone, are former Major League Baseball players. Aaron is currently the manager of the New York Yankees. Bret's son Jake Boone played in the Washington Nationals minor league system and later joined the New York Mets' front office.

Boone's extended family have been sportsmen. His mother Patsy was a synchronized swimmer who swam with Esther Williams in the movies. His sister Terry was a champion swimmer, and his brother Rod was a college baseball star who played Triple-A ball in the Astros and Royals organizations.

Boone died on November 9, 2026, at the age of 78.

== See also ==
- List of Major League Baseball career putouts as a catcher leaders
- Third-generation Major League Baseball families
