= Marieke =

Dutch feminine given name

- Pronunciation: Dutch: [maːˈrikə]
- Gender: Feminine
- Language: Dutch

Origin
- Derivation: Marie + ke
- Meaning: little Marie

Other names
- Alternative spelling: Marike
- Derived: Maria

Marieke (Dutch pronunciation: [maːˈrikə]), also spelled Marike, is a Dutch-language feminine given name, a diminutive of Maria. The Polish, Greek and Japanese equivalent is Marika.

The -ke suffix is characteristic for Flemish, Brabantian and Limburgish dialects, indicating that the name perhaps originated in present-day Belgium or the south of the Netherlands.

== People named Marieke or Marike ==
People with the given name Marieke include:

- Marieke van Amerom (born 1942), Dutch painter
- Marieke Blaauw (born 1979), Dutch animator
- Marieke D'Cruz (born 1986), Australian swimmer
- Marieke van Doorn (born 1960), Dutch field hockey player
- Marieke van Drogenbroek (born 1964), Dutch rower
- Marieke van den Ham (born 1983), Dutch water polo player
- Marieke Hardy (born 1976), Australian writer, producer, and actress
- Marieke Hommels, Dutch cricketer
- Marieke Huisman (born 1973), Dutch computer scientist
- Marieke Keijser (born 1997), Dutch rower
- Marieke Koekkoek (born 1989), Dutch politician
- Marieke Lettink, New Zealand herpetologist
- Marieke Nijkamp, Dutch writer
- Marieke Nivard (born 1990), Dutch golfer
- Marieke van der Putten (born 1982), Dutch dressage rider
- Marieke Lucas Rijneveld (born 1991), Dutch writer
- Marieke Sanders-ten Holte (born 1941), Dutch politician
- Marieke Stam (born 1964), Dutch speed skater
- Marieke Veenhoven-Mattheussens (born 1984), Dutch field hockey player
- Marieke Veltman (born 1971), American long jumper
- Marieke Verbiesen, Dutch new media artist
- Marieke Vervoort (1979–2019), Belgian para-athlete
- Marieke van der Wal (born 1979), Dutch handball player
- Marieke van Wanroij (born 1979), Dutch cyclist
- Marieke van der Werf (born 1959), Dutch politician
- Marieke Vellinga-Beemsterboer (born 1986), Dutch politician
- Marieke Westerhof (born 1974), Dutch rower
- Marieke Wijen-Nass (born 1993), Dutch politician
- Marieke Wijsman (born 1975), Dutch speed skater
- Marieke van Witzenburg-de Groot (born 1985), Dutch cyclist

People with the given name Marike include:

- Marike Bok (1943–2017), Dutch portrait painter
- Marike Jager (born 1979), Dutch singer-songwriter
- Marike de Klerk (1937–2001), First Lady of South Africa
- Marike Paulsson, legal scholar
- Marike Steinacker (born 1992), German discus thrower
- Marieke van Emmerik (born 2007), German Model, winner of Miss World 2026

== See also ==
- "Marieke" (song), song by Jacques Brel
- Marieke (album), music album by Jacques Brel
- Marijke, Dutch feminine given name
- Mariken van Nieumeghen, protagonist in a miracle play from the early 16th century
- Marike Forest Park, a forest park in the Gambia
