= Marijke =

Dutch and German feminine given name

- Pronunciation: Dutch: [maːˈrɛikə] German: [maˈʁaɪkə]
- Language: Dutch

Origin
- Derivation: Maria

Other names
- Alternative spelling: Mareike

Marijke, sometimes Germanized as Mareike, is a Dutch feminine given name. It is originally a diminutive of Mary. Phonetically, the name is said muh-rye-kah/keh, preferably with a rolling “r”.

== People named Marijke/Mareike ==
People with the given name Marijke include:

- Princess Marijke (later "Princess Christina"), youngest daughter of Queen Juliana of the Netherlands
- Marijke Abels (born 1948), Dutch visual artist and instructor
- Marijke Amado (born 1954), Dutch television presenter
- Marijke van Beukering-Huijbregts (born 1971), Dutch politician
- Marijke Callebaut (born 1980), retired Belgian footballer
- Marijke Djwalapersad (born 1951), Surinamese politician
- Marijke Engelen (born 1961), Dutch synchronized swimmer
- Marijke de Goey (born 1947), Dutch visual artist
- Marijke van Haaren (born 1952), Dutch politician
- Marijke Hanegraaf (born 1946), Dutch poet
- Marijke Kegge (born 1957), Dutch sprint canoer
- Marijke Mars (born 1965), American billionaire heiress and businesswoman
- Marijke Moser (born 1946), Dutch-born Swiss middle and long-distance runner
- Marijke Nel (born 1967), South African-born Canadian tennis player and former South African women's rugby union player.
- Marijke Ruiter (born 1954), Dutch swimmer, 10-fold champion at the Paralympic Games
- Marijke Schaar née Jansen (born 1944), Dutch tennis player
- Marijke Synhaeve (born 1989), Dutch politician
- Marijke Verpoorten, Belgian researcher and professor at the University of Antwerp
- Marijke Vos (born 1957), Dutch politician
- Marijke van Warmerdam (born 1959), Dutch photographer, installation artist, and video artist

People with the given name Mareike include:

- Mareike Adams (born 1990), German rower
- Mareike Carrière (1954-2014), German actress, spokesperson and translator.
- Mareike Hermeier (born 1989), German politician
- Mareike Miller née Adermann (born 1990), German wheelchair basketball player

== See also ==
- Marieke
- Mariken (disambiguation)
