= Mattheussens =

Mattheussens is a Dutch surname. Notable people with the surname include:

- Maria Mattheussens-Fikkers (born 1949), Dutch field hockey player
- Marieke Veenhoven-Mattheussens (born 1984), Dutch field hockey player, daughter of Maria
