= Van Duren =

van Duren is a surname. Notable people with the surname include:

- André van Duren (born 1958), Dutch film director
- Hendrik Jan van Duren (1937–2008), Dutch politician
- Mart van Duren (born 1964), Dutch footballer
