= Špalíček (ballet) =

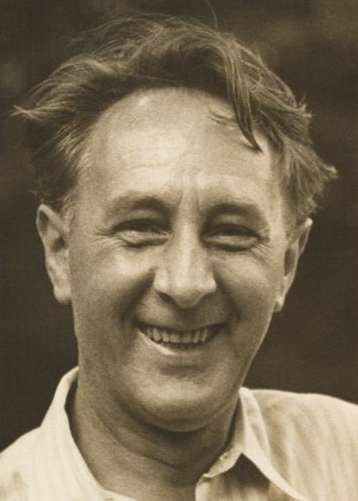
Bohuslav Martinů in c. 1942

Bohuslav Martinů's Špalíček (H. 214), completed in 1932 and subtitled "Ballet from folk games, customs, and fairytales—Ballet-revue", premiered at Prague's National Theatre in 1933. Its title (The Chapbook or The Little Block) refers to eighteenth-century Bohemian folk-song books sold at fairs. Based on Czech folklore and children's games, the work consists of a prologue followed by three acts of episodes treating Puss in Boots, the Cobbler and Death, and the legends of Dorothea and Cinderella.

== Background ==
From a long way off he was preparing himself for theatre work: for national Czech plays, for the ballet Špalíček and the operas Hry o Marii (The Plays of Mary) and Divadlo za bránou (The Theatre beyond the Gate). Špalíček was Martinů's principal theatrical project of the first half of the 1930s. It is possible that Martinů was influenced by his teacher Roussel's opéra-ballet Padmâvatî or by Stravinsky's L'Histoire du soldat. Martinů worked out the scenario himself, basing it on recollections of fairy tales from his childhood. The structure of one unrelated story leading to another was influenced by the pantomime ballet Z pohádky do pohádky by Oskar Nedbal, first performed in Prague in 1908. References to village customs local to his birthplace would recur in works such as Kytice (Bouquet of Flowers) of 1937, the Zbojnické písně (Brigands songs) of 1957, and the four folk cantatas of 1955-59. The work was composed in Paris in 1931 and completed in February 1932.

The first version of Špalíček was for chamber orchestra, but in 1940, alongside alterations, he re-scored it for larger forces. The Spectre's Bride (Svatebni Kosíle), a cantata for soprano, tenor, bass and mixed chorus, titled 'Ballad after K J Erben's poem' was originally the final part of Špalíček but was dropped from the ballet mainly since it made the performance too long. The first version lasts around two hours and 10 minutes, and requires double woodwind, two each horns, trumpets, trombones, timpani and percussion, piano, and strings. The revised version, made by the composer in 1940, premiered at the Národní divadlo in Prague on 2 April 1949, conducted by Václav Kašlík (1917-1989), lasts around 100 minutes, with extra wind and brass. The autograph scores are kept respectively at the Czech National Museum of Music in Prague, and at the BM Memorial museum in Polička, the composer's birthplace.

Soon after the first production opened at the National Theatre in Prague on 19 September 1933, conducted by Josef Charvát (1884-1945), a rival production opened in Brno which ran for four years in repertory. It has been revived over the years at the Prague National Theatre and elsewhere in Czechia and in Slovakia, and was recorded in 1988.

The work won Martinů the Bedřich Smetana prize for composition in 1934. Grove describes the ballet as “an extended and brilliant evocation of folk customs that includes episodes amounting to miniature operas”.

Martinů's Nový Špalíček H.288 is not related to the ballet, being a song cycle set to Moravian folk poetry dating from 1942 for voice and piano. The prize-winning 1947 animated puppet feature film by Jiří Trnka titled Špalíček is often translated as The Czech Year and consists of fairy-tales.

== Scenario ==
In the prologue a chorus of children play four song and dance games where the fairy tale action is danced while singers narrate the stories. which include the chicken and a hen; the former chokes on a large grain of corn and needs to swallow it with water. The hen tries the spring, dress-maker and tailor, but heaven sends the water to save the chicken's life. Then comes Puss in Boots, again with much dance, but no chorus. Three children's games follow: the maidens, the water-sprite, and the wolf.

Act II depicts the story of the Cobbler and Death: an old shoemaker falls out with his neighbours and leaves his home. A butterfly leads him to a black tower in which a princess is held prisoner by a giant. Between them the butterfly and cobbler free the princess and he wins a sack inside of which is death; as long as he wanders abroad with death no one dies, but, exhausted he arrives at heaven and the sack is opened. This tale is mostly danced.

Act III opens with the legend of Dorothea of Caesarea where the girl is killed by a crowd, but the mood changes for Cinderella set in a Czech village, finishing with waltzes to be danced at her wedding.

== Music ==
The ballet makes use of Bohemian/Moravian folk music with Martinů's characteristic scoring. Brian Large describes the music as “tuneful, exciting and eminently danceable” which shows a “flair for writing for the stage”. Šafránek terms the work the “form of a revue in which scenes follow each other in quick succession and the choreography and music are most effectively combined”.

== Recordings ==
- Complete on Supraphon (SU 3925-2): Anna Kratochvílová (soprano), Miroslav Kopp (tenor), Richard Novák (bass), Kantilena Children's chorus (Chorus master Ján Sedláček), Kühn Female Chorus, Chorus master Pavel Kühn, Brno Philharmonic Orchestra, conducted by František Jílek, recorded at the Stadion Studio, Brno in 1988.
- Suites have been recorded by the Brno State Philharmonic Orchestra, conducted by Jiří Waldhans (Supraphon, 1979) and Charles Mackerras (Conifer, 1991)
