= Hanegraaf =

Hanegraaf is a Dutch surname. Notable people with the surname include:

- Jacques Hanegraaf (born 1960), Dutch cyclist
- Marijke Hanegraaf (born 1946), Dutch poet
- Wouter Hanegraaff (born 1961), historian of religion

== See also ==
- Hanegraaff
