= Mariken =

Mariken is a medieval Dutch name (Modern Dutch Marijke), and may refer to:

- Mariken van Nieumeghen, a medieval Dutch prose text and its protagonist
- Mariken van Nieumeghen (1974 film)
- Mariken (2000 film)
