= Divadlo za branou =

Divadlo za branou may refer to:

- Divadlo za branou (opera) (The Theatre beyond the Gate op. H.251) a 1936 radio opera by Bohuslav Martinů
- Divadlo za branou (theatre), theatre in Prague founded by Otomar Krejča in 1965
