= Golden Calf for Best Music =

Dutch film award

The following is a list of winners of the Golden Calf for best music at the NFF. This category has been awarded since 2003.

- 2026 Spinvis - Toutes Directions
- 2025 Ella van der Woude - Alpha.
- 2024 Gino Taihuttu & Jiri Taihuttu - Hardcore Never Dies
- 2023 Minco Eggersman - De man uit Rome
- 2022 Ella van der Woude - Moloch
- 2021 Gino Taihuttu - The East
- 2020 Rui Reis Maia, Jasper Boeke and Diederik Rijpstra - The Promise of Pisa
- 2019 Rutger Reinders - Dirty God
- 2018 Harry de Wit - Cobain
- 2017 Junkie XL - Brimstone
- 2016 Alex Simu - Beyond Sleep
- 2015 Palmbomen - Prins
- 2014 Christiaan Verbeek - Helium
- 2013 New Cool Collective - Toegetakeld door de liefde
- 2012 Helge Slikker - Kauwboy
- 2011 Het paleis van boem - The Gang of Oss
- 2010 Ernst Reijseger - C’est Déjà L’été
- 2009 Perquisite - Carmen van het Noorden
- 2008 Michiel Borstlap - Tiramisu
- 2007 Vincent van Warmerdam - Kicks
- 2006 Giorgio Tuinfort, Bart van de Lisdonk, Big Orange & Earforce - Bolletjes Blues
- 2005 Paul M. van Brugge - Alias Kurban Saïd
- 2004 Mark van Platen - Young Kees
- 2003 Fons Merkies - Boy Ecury

== Sources ==
- Golden Calf Awards (Dutch)
- NFF Website
