= Heading for England =

1992 film by André van Duren

Richting Engeland
- Directed by: André van Duren
- Written by: Willem Wilmink, Peter van Gestel
- Cinematography: Theo Bierkens
- Edited by: Rob Hakhoff
- Music by: Mark van Platen
- Distributed by: Hungry Eye Pictures
- Release date: 1992
- Country: Netherlands
- Language: Dutch

Heading for England or Richting Engeland is a 1992 Dutch film directed by André van Duren.

== Cast ==
- Gerard Thoolen ... Verteller
- Geert Lageveen ... Hans
- Maike Meijer ... Sonja
- Peter Faber ... Vader van hans
- Rick Nicolet ... Moeder van hans
- Herman Veerkamp ... Broer van hans
- Wim Van Der Grijn ... Leraar duits
- Trins Snijders ... Lerares engels
- Huib Broos ... Tekenleraar
- Hein van der Heijden ... Jaap
- Peter Paul Muller ... Wim
- Cees Mooij ... Henkie
- Carol van Herwijnen ... Kapper oostinga
- Henry Drumond ... Joris
- Jurrian Knijtijzer ... Jonge hans
