= Hry o Marii =

Hry o Marii ("The Plays of Mary", sometimes referred to as "The Miracle of Our Lady") is a Czech-language opera cycle in four parts, by Bohuslav Martinů. The first performance was on 23 February 1935 at the National Theatre in Brno, with Antonín Balatka conducting, and stage direction by Rudolf Walter. It has been described as "a work of great originality, unlike any other opera" and "imbued with a strange mysticism".

== Background ==
Hry o Marii was a natural development from Martinů's previous stage work, the folk ballet Špalíček, where he had used the legend of St Dorothea and conjured a series of short folk scenes. The four operas were inspired by open-air performances of plays with religious theme he saw in Paris. He originally set out to set music to several Czech miracle plays but settled on mainly French and Flemish stories, with the Nativity Play based mainly on Moravian folk poetry. In the operas the composer broadened the scope of Czech operatic possibilities by drawing on medieval folk drama and binding together traditional elements into a dramatic whole. A Czechoslovak state prize was conferred on Martinů in 1935 for the work. The musical language is characteristic of the composer at the time, while looking forward to his 1950s cantatas and The Greek Passion. The work enjoyed instant recognition, but its folk-style and religious elements displeased both Nazi and Communist regimes. It was revived in Wiesbaden in 1966 (in a German translation), then in Czechoslovak opera houses in 1968 and 1969, when it was also filmed by Czechoslovak television. A production in Brno nearly two decades later conducted by Jiří Bělohlávek offered an opportunity to witness the opera again. A Prague production was mounted in November 1990. The second part (Mariken of Nijmegen) was given on a double bill with Oedipus Rex, in Oxford in 1993. In 2005 a full production was staged in Plzeň under Jan Zbavitel. Jiří Bělohlávek conducted a new production at the Prague National Theatre in 2009 in a staging by Jiří Herman.

A complete digital recording was issued by Supraphon in the 1980s, with Marie Mrázová, Jiřina Marková, Anna Kratochvílová, Eva Děpoltová, Václav Zítek, Dalibor Jedlička, the Prague Radio Chorus, Prague Symphony Orchestra, conducted by Jiří Bělohlávek.

== Structure ==
=== Prologue (1) ===
The Wise and Foolish Virgins, is based on a 12th century Provençal folk tale, adapted by Vítezslav Nezval. After a chorus calling on the virgins to stay awake for a bridegroom from the East, the Archangel Gabriel then addresses the two group of virgins (those awake, and those whose candles have gone out). The foolish virgins plead to the wise virgins for oil to keep their candles alight, and they are scolded by shopkeepers. The bridegroom scorns the foolish and the scene ends with a chorus acknowledging his arrival. The opera acts as a shorter opening tableau for the longer section which follows (as The Nativity does for Part 4).

=== Part 2 ===
The 'miracle' Mary of Nijmegen, uses a libretto by Henri Ghéon, 1933, after the Flemish legend, in a Czech translation by Vilém Závada. There is a spoken introduction to the story of a young woman who marries the devil. After Mariken's gets lost in woods and her seduction there by the devil, during which he pulls the cross from around her neck, there is a dance for the devil and the maid depicting the struggle for her soul. Mariken sings joyously of her new life, and there is a scene in a tavern with chorus and dancing, and a final section introduced again by the Principal where he describes her despair, but where finally she is redeemed through the intercession of the Mother of God against the case for the devil, Maskaron, and which ends with a female chorus of praise.

=== Part 3 ===
The Nativity of our Lord, (described as a 'pastoral') sets Moravian folk poetry; in the first scene the Virgin seeks a lodging but is turned away by a blacksmith. Later Mary gives birth to Christ in a barn where a miracle restores the hands to the blacksmith's daughter and the blacksmith regrets his action. A children's chorus accompanies the tale of the Virgin's journey to Bethlehem, Christ's birth, baptism and godfathers.

=== Part 4 ===
The 'legend' Sister Pasqualina, is based on a play by Julius Zeyer with words by the composer, and other folk poetry. This is a more dramatic episode, also with dancing, where Pasqualina, entranced through the devil, absconds her convent with a knight and lives a life of sin. But a statue of Mary descends from her pedestal and takes Pasqualina's place in the convent. There is a choral interlude. Meanwhile after several years the devil kills her lover and accuses Pasqualina of murder and she is condemned to death. Mary drives the flames from the stake around Pasqualina who escapes her chains. When in the final scene she returns to regain her place at the convent, as Mary leaves the nuns Pasqualina drops dead; she is lain on her bed by the nuns.
