= Peter van Gestel =

Dutch writer (1937–2019)

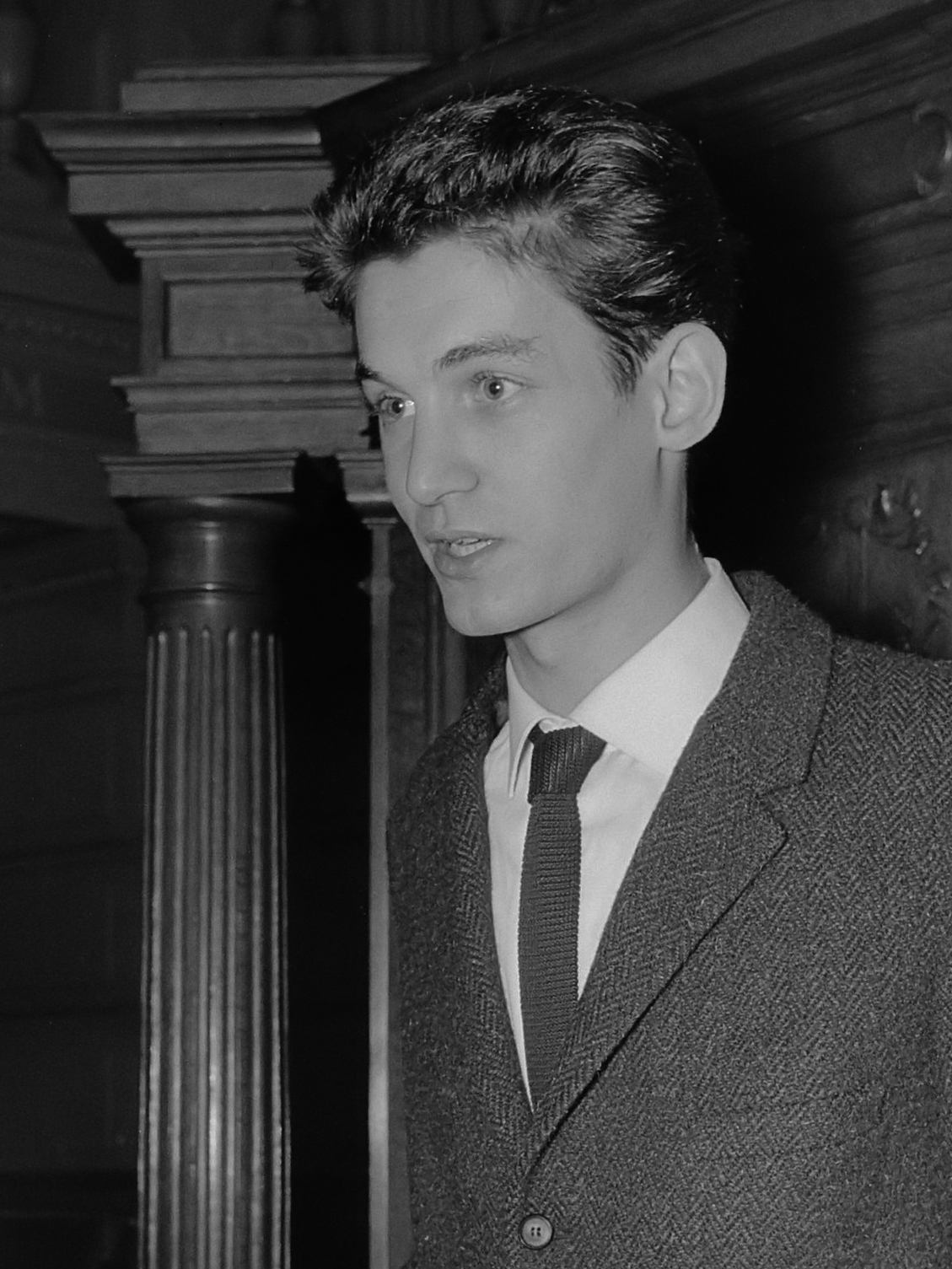
- Peter van Gestel (1961)
- Born: 3 August 1937; Amsterdam, Netherlands
- Died: 1 March 2019 (aged 81); Amsterdam, Netherlands
- Occupation: Writer
- Writing career
- Pen name: Peter van Gestel; Sander Joosten
- Language: Dutch
- Years active: 1962–2019
- Notable awards: Nienke van Hichtum-prijs 1987 2003; Gouden Griffel 2002; Woutertje Pieterse Prijs 2002; Theo Thijssen-prijs 2006

Peter van Gestel (3 August 1937, Amsterdam – 1 March 2019, Amsterdam) was a Dutch writer.

== Career ==
=== Writing ===
Van Gestel made his debut in 1962 with Drempelvrees, a collection of stories. He received the Reina Prinsen Geerligsprijs for this book. In 1976, he published the book Ver van huis under the pseudonym Sander Joosten. He made his debut in children's literature with Schuilen onder je schooltas in 1979. He received the Vlag en Wimpel award for this book. He received the Nienke van Hichtum-prijs 1987 for his book Ko Kruier en zijn stadsgenoten (1985) with illustrations by Peter van Straaten.

For his children's book Winterijs he won the Woutertje Pieterse Prijs 2002 as well as the Gouden Griffel 2002 award and the Nienke van Hichtum-prijs 2003. He became the first to be awarded these three awards for a single book. Winterijs tells the story of a ten year old living in Amsterdam in the winter of 1947 developing a friendship with a Jewish boy. The story is inspired by van Gestel's brother's friendship with a Jewish boy when both were also ten years old. Van Gestel does not consider the book to be an autobiography but acknowledges that there are many similarities between the characters and people from his youth.

In 2006, he won the Theo Thijssen-prijs for his entire oeuvre.

=== Radio, television and film ===
In 1986, he adapted the book Het wassende water (1925) written by Herman de Man to television. The idea to adapt the book to television came from van Gestel's experience as dramaturge for Anton Quintana's radio play also based on the same book.

Van Gestel wrote the story for the 1999 film Een dubbeltje te weinig and he co-wrote the story for 1992 film Richting Engeland with Willem Wilmink. Both films were directed by André van Duren.

In 1997, he adapted late medieval Dutch text Mariken van Nieumeghen into the children's book Mariken. He received the Gouden Uil 1998 award for this book and the story was used for the 2000 film Mariken. Van Gestel co-wrote the screenplay for the film with Kim van Kooten.

== Death ==
Van Gestel died in March 2019.

== Awards ==
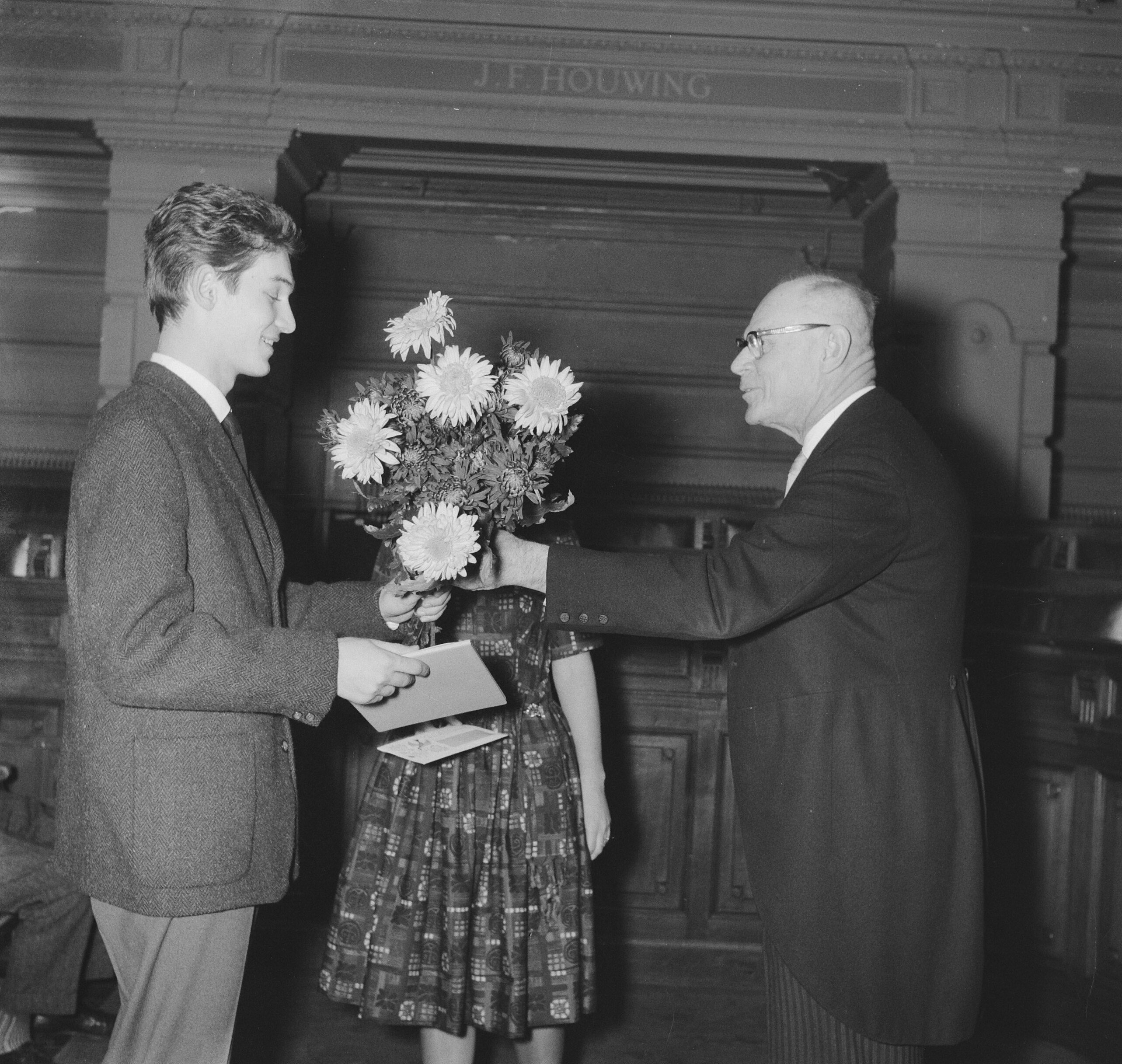
Van Gestel receiving the Reina Prinsen Geerligsprijs (1961)

- 1961 – Reina Prinsen Geerligsprijs, Drempelvrees
- 1980 – Vlag en Wimpel, Schuilen onder je schooltas
- 1982 – Vlag en Wimpel, Joost, of De domme avonturen van een slim jongetje
- 1985 – Zilveren Griffel, Uit het leven van Ko Kruier
- 1987 – Nienke van Hichtum-prijs, Ko Kruier en zijn stadsgenoten
- 1989 – Vlag en Wimpel, OEF van de mensen
- 1995 – Vlag en Wimpel, Prinses Roosje
- 1995 – Vlag en Wimpel, Lieve Claire
- 1998 – Gouden Uil, Mariken
- 1998 – Jonge Gouden Uil, Mariken
- 1998 – Zilveren Griffel, Mariken
- 2000 – Vlag en Wimpel, Slapen en schooieren
- 2000 – nomination Gouden Uil, Slapen en schooieren
- 2002 – Gouden Griffel, Winterijs
- 2002 – Woutertje Pieterse Prijs, Winterijs
- 2003 – Nienke van Hichtum-prijs, Winterijs
- 2004 – nomination Gouden Uil, Die dag aan zee
- 2006 – Theo Thijssen-prijs, entire oeuvre
