= Veessen =

- Village
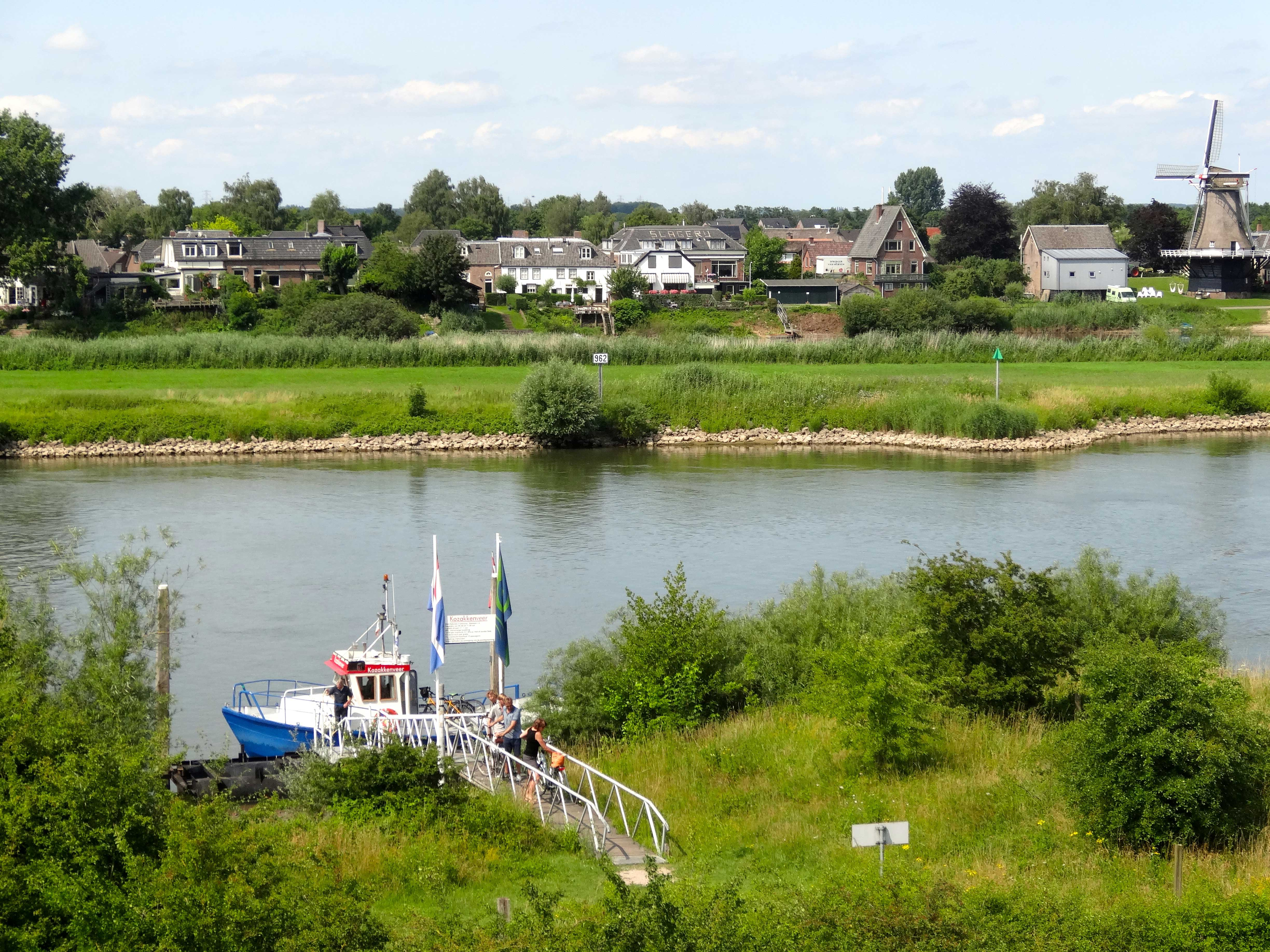
- Harbour of Veessen

- Location in the Netherlands Veessen (Netherlands)
- Coordinates: 52.3750°N 6.0886°E
- Country: Netherlands
- Province: Gelderland
- Municipality: Heerde

Area
  - Total: 4.34 km^{2} (1.68 sq mi)
- Elevation: 5 m (16 ft)

Population (2021)
  - Total: 685
  - Density: 158/km^{2} (409/sq mi)
- Time zone: UTC+1 (CET)
  - Summer (DST): UTC+2 (CEST)
- Postal code: 8194
- Dialing code: 0578

Veessen is a village in the Dutch province of Gelderland. It is located in the municipality of Heerde.

Veessen was a separate municipality between 1812 and 1818, when it was merged with Heerde.

It was first mentioned in 1217 as Vesce. The etymology is unclear. Veessen is an esdorp near the IJssel River. Later, it developed into a linear settlement on the dike. The Dutch Reformed has been built in 1843 as a replacement of a medieval church. The Mölle van Bats is a grist mill built in 1779. A stream engine driven mill was built next to windmill in 1888. In 1840, Veessen was home to 775 people.

== Gallery ==
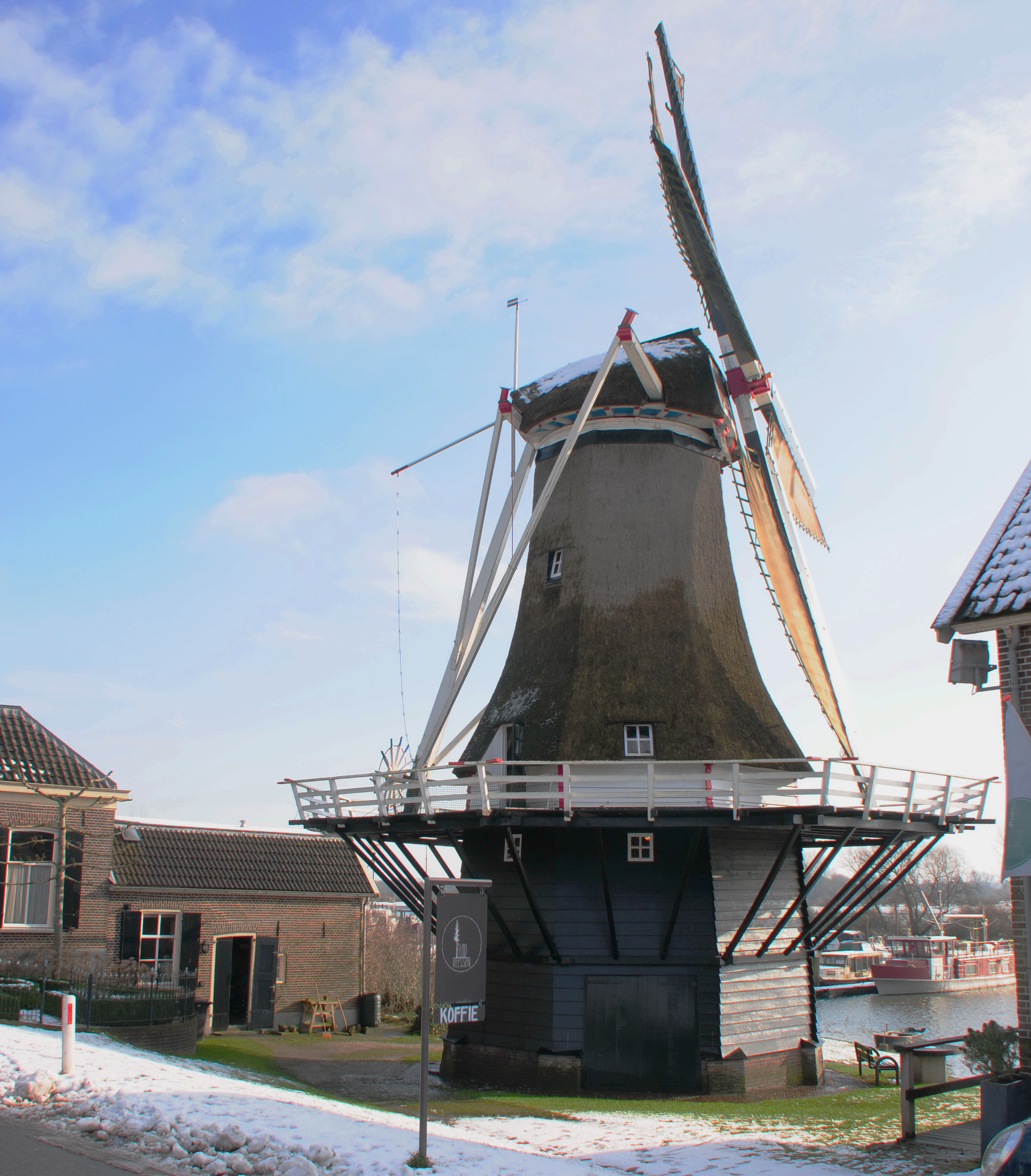
Mölle van Bats

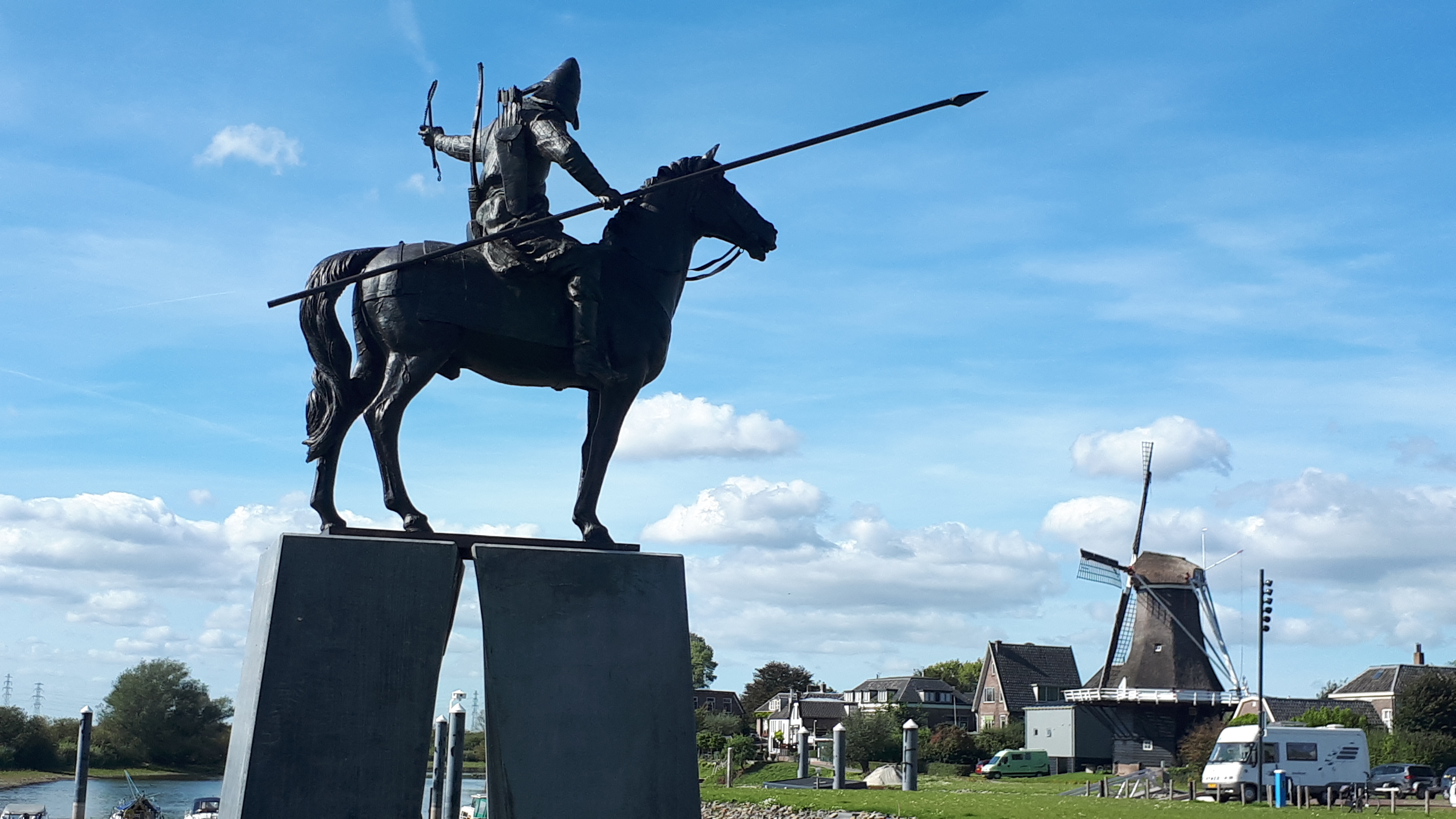
Statue at the harbour

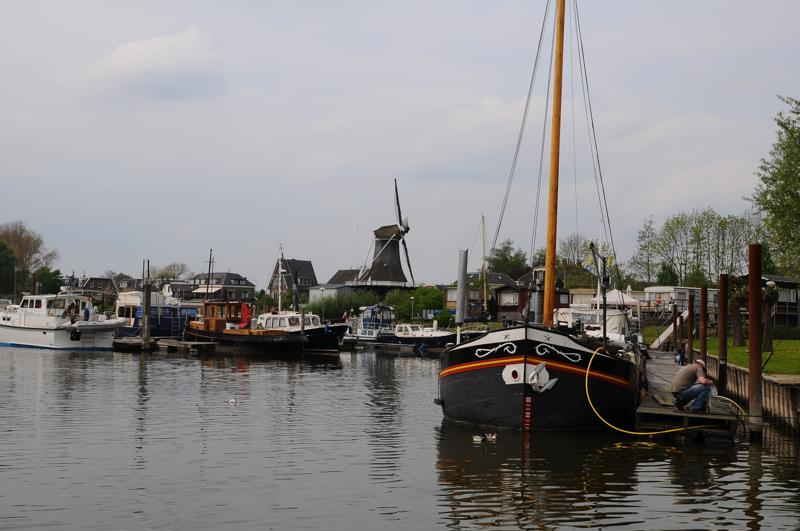
Harbour of Veessen

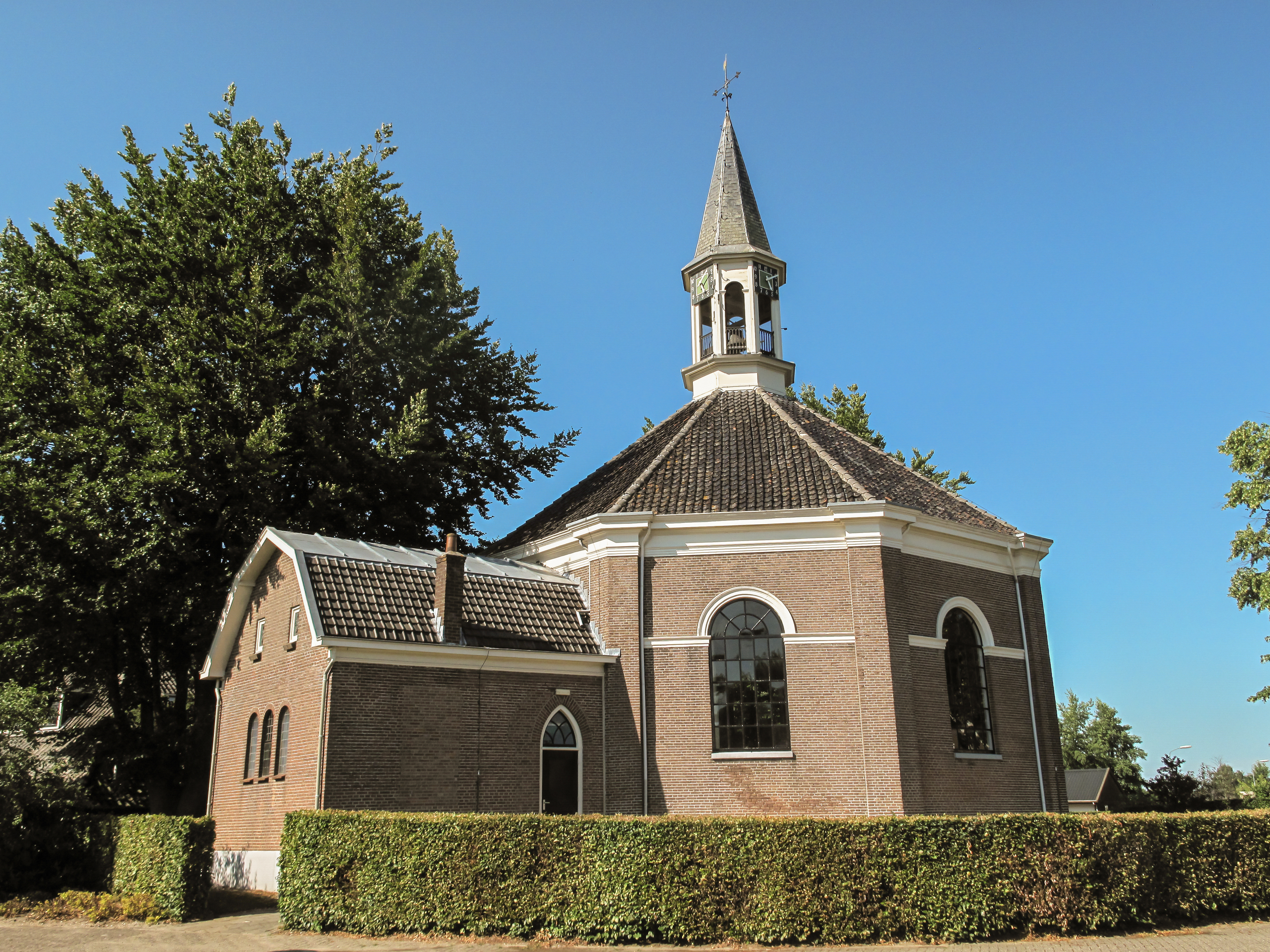
Dutch Reformed Church
