= Hendrik Jan van Duren =

Dutch politician

Hendrik Jan van Duren (30 April 1937, in Heerde, Gelderland – 5 February 2008, in Wapenveld) was a Dutch politician.
