= Young Kees =

2003 Dutch-language film

- Theatrical release poster
- Directed by: André van Duren
- Written by: Bob in 't Hout; Maarten Lebens
- Based on: Kees the boy by Theo Thijssen
- Produced by: Matthijs van Heijningen
- Starring: Ruud Feltkamp; Monic Hendrickx; Hannah Cheney; Theo Maassen; Hans Kesting
- Cinematography: Steve Walker
- Edited by: Martyn Gould
- Music by: Mark van Platen
- Production companies: Sigma Pictures Productions; NCRV
- Distributed by: Universal Pictures (through United International Pictures)
- Release date: 27 November 2003
- Running time: 95 minutes
- Countries: Netherlands; Germany; United Kingdom
- Language: Dutch
- Box office: $440,968

Young Kees (Dutch: Kees de Jongen) is a 2003 Dutch-language drama film directed by André van Duren, based on the 1923 novel Kees the boy by Theo Thijssen.

The film was released on 27 November 2003, It received mixed reviews from critics.

== Cast ==
- Ruud Feltkamp as Kees Bakels
- Hannah Cheney as Rosa Overbeek
- Wim van der Grijn as Opa Bakels
- Nelly Frijda as Opoe Bakels
- Hans Kesting as Meester
- Theo Maassen as Father Bakels
- Monic Hendrickx as Mother Bakels
- Sebas Berman as Van Dam
- Yannick van de Velde as De Veer
- Stefan de Walle as Father De Veer
- Friso van Ham sa Donker
- Merel Hulzink as Truusje Bakels
- Mits Hommeles as Tom Bakels
- Hans Dagelet as Kleermaker Kraak
- Floris van Bommel as Klant
- Tjitske Reidinga as Juffrouw Dubois
- Tanja Jess as Tante Jeanne
- Frederik Brom as Oom Dirk
- Carine Crutzen as Mevr. Bogaerts
- Egbert-Jan Weeber as Kees Bakels (23 years old)
- Katja Herbers as Rosa (23 years old)

== Accolades ==
Accolades received by Young Kees
Year	Award	Category	Recipient(s)	Result	Ref.
2004	Netherlands Film Festival	Golden Calf for Best Music	Mark van Platen	Won	
