= Jaap Zielhuis =

Dutch sailor (born 1966)

Personal information
- Full name: Jacob Dirk Zielhuis
- Nationality: Dutch
- Born: 2 July 1966 (age 60) Heerde, Netherlands
- Height: 1.89 m (6.2 ft)

Sailing career
- Sport: Sailing
- Club: Watersportvereniging Braassemermeer
- Class: Finn
- Updated on 14 February 2014

Jacob Dirk "Jaap" Zielhuis (born 2 July 1966 in Heerde) is a sailor from the Netherlands. Zielhuis represented his country at the 2004 Summer Olympics in Athens. Zielhuis took 19th place in the Finn. During the Sydney Olympics 2000 Zielhuis was coach of the Dutch Olympic Sailing Team.

Nowadays Zielhuis is coach of the Dutch Olympic Sailing Team.
