= Teufenbachweiher =

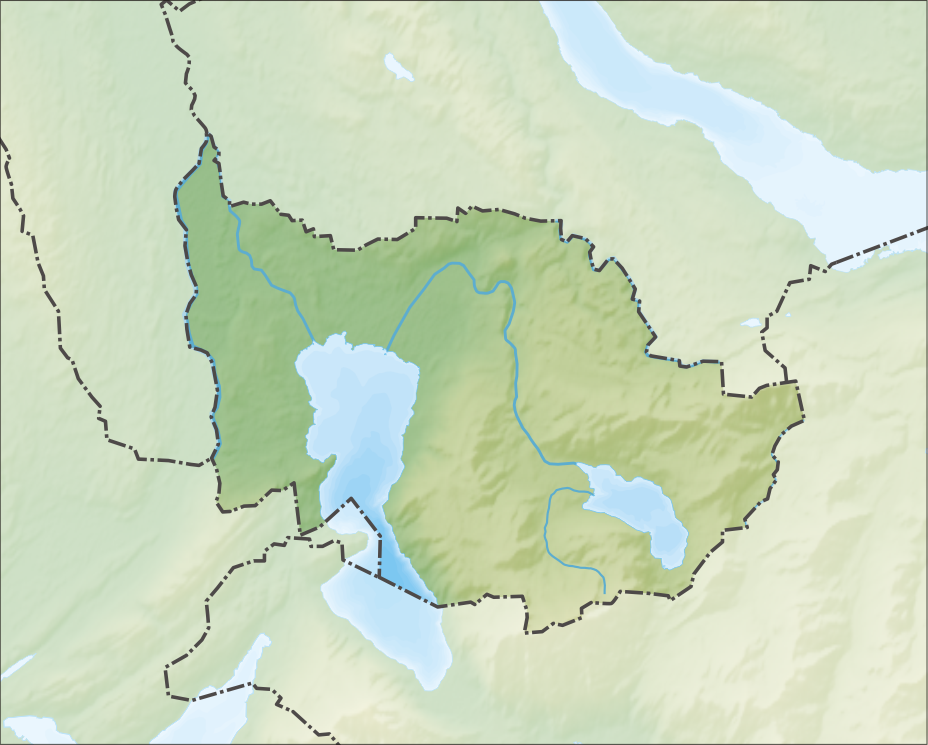
- Location within Canton of Zurich Location within Canton of Zug Location within Switzerland Location within Alps
- Interactive map of Teufenbachweiher
- Location: Canton of Zurich
- Coordinates: 47°10′50.63″N 8°38′18.74″E
- Type: reservoir
- Primary inflows: Teufenbach
- Primary outflows: Teufenbach
- Catchment area: 1.25 km^{2} (0.48 sq mi)
- Basin countries: Switzerland
- Surface area: 4.2 ha (10 acres)
- Water volume: 0.23 million cubic metres (190 acre⋅ft)
- Settlements: Schönenberg

Teufenbachweiher is a reservoir in the municipality of Schönenberg, Canton of Zurich, Switzerland. Its surface area is 4.2 ha (10 acres).
