= Mark van Platen =

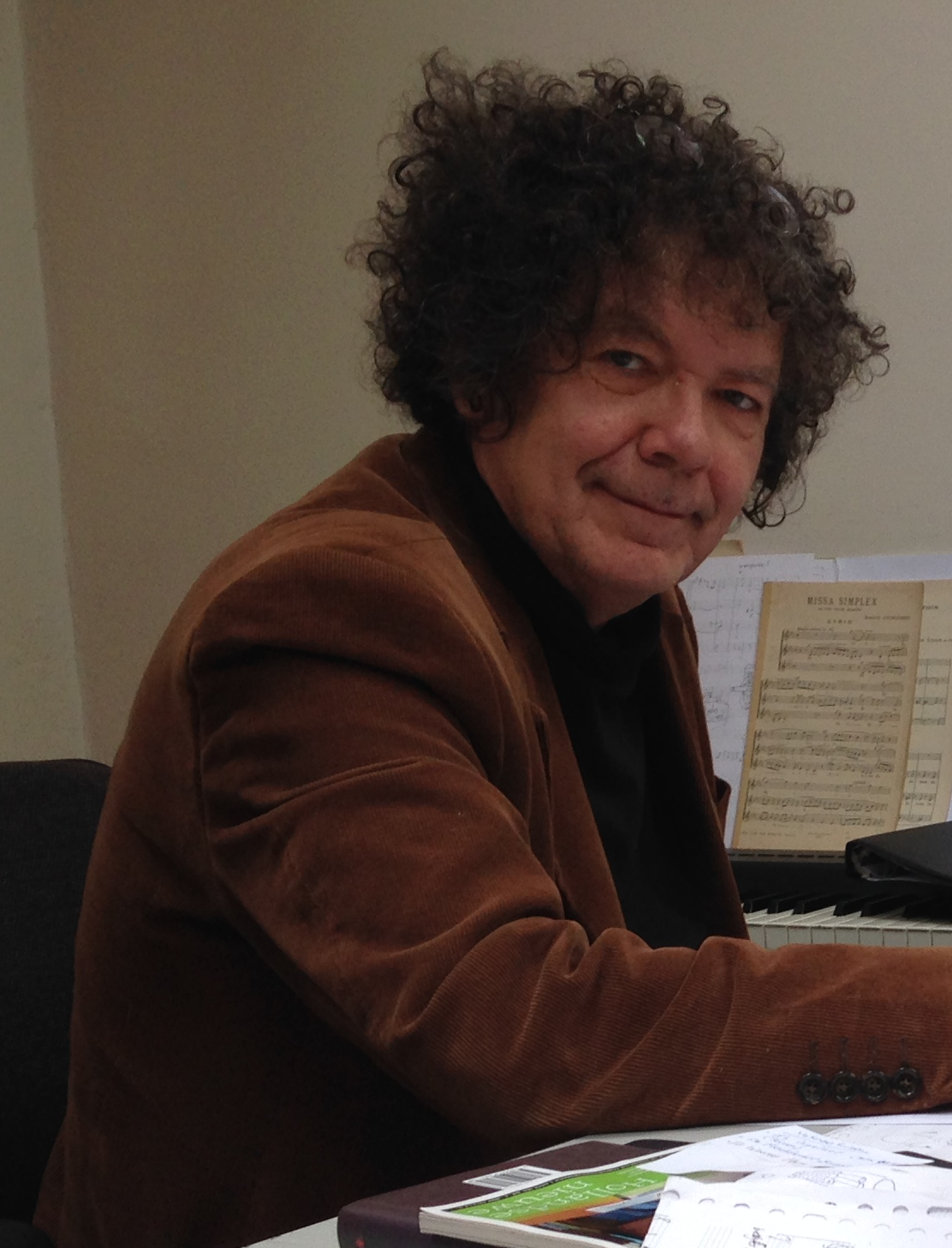

Background information
- Born: Marcus Johannes Nicasius Maria van Platen; January 28, 1955; Netherlands
- Genres: classical
- Occupations: composer, conductor, organist, pianist

Mark van Platen (born 1955) is a Dutch composer, conductor, organist and pianist. In 2004, he was presented a Gouden Kalf (Dutch equivalent of the Oscars) for his music score for the Dutch film Kees De Jongen.

== Biography ==
Van Platen completed his education as an organist, choirmaster and pianist at the Brabants Conservatorium college of music in Tilburg under Maurice Pirenne, Cees Rotteveel and Ton Demmers. In 1992, he obtained the orchestra conductor's diploma at the Royal Conservatory of The Hague under Ed Spanjaard.

== Works ==
=== List of works ( selection ) ===
- Notre Père (1980) for women's choir
- Dance de Puck (1982) for ensemble
- Duo (1983) for violin and cello
- Musica Interrotta (1984) for bassoon and piano
- Variazioni (1985) for chamber ensemble
- Kleine suite (1986) for clarinet quartet
- Introductiemuziek Für Elise (1986) for ensemble
- Preludium-Intermezzo-Postludium (1986) for wind instruments and percussion
- Lamentations (1988) for wind instruments, percussion and guitar
- Drie monologen (1990) for organ
- Licht (2005) for ensemble
- Bewerking van Nederlandse volksliederen (2007) for men's choir
- Compositie voor Het Veldhovens Amateurorkest (2007) for ensemble
- Nunc Dimittis (2008) for men's choir
- Missa Ego Clamavi (2008) for children's choir
- Bewerkingen van delen uit de Midzomernachtsdroom (2009) for wind ensemble
- Lecture de Cioran (2010) for choir
- Attendite et videte (2012) for choir
- After visiting Rothko (2015) for organ

=== Filmography ===
Title	Year	Director	Lead Roles
Richting Engeland	1992	André van Duren	Geert Lageveen, Peter Faber, Rick Nicolet
Tijger	1995	André van Duren	Emile de la Bruheze, Joel Albert de la Bruheze
Tijd van Leven	1996	André van Duren	Anneke Blok, Victor Löw, Anne-Marie Heyligers
El Toro	1997	André van Duren	Emile de la Bruheze, Joel Albert de la Bruheze
Honger	1998	André van Duren	Hidde Maas, Ella van Drumpt, Maike Meijer, Leopold Witte
Mariken	2000	André van Duren	Laurien Van den Broeck, Jan Decleir, Willeke van Ammelrooy
Kees De jongen	2003	André van Duren	Ruud Feltkamp, Wim van der Grijn, Theo Maassen
