= Hanegraaff =

Hanegraaff is a surname. Notable people with the surname include:

- Hank Hanegraaff (born 1950), American Christian author and radio talk-show host
- Wouter Hanegraaff (born 1961), Dutch academic, expert on Western esotericism

== See also ==
- Hanegraaf
