= Heerde =

- Municipality
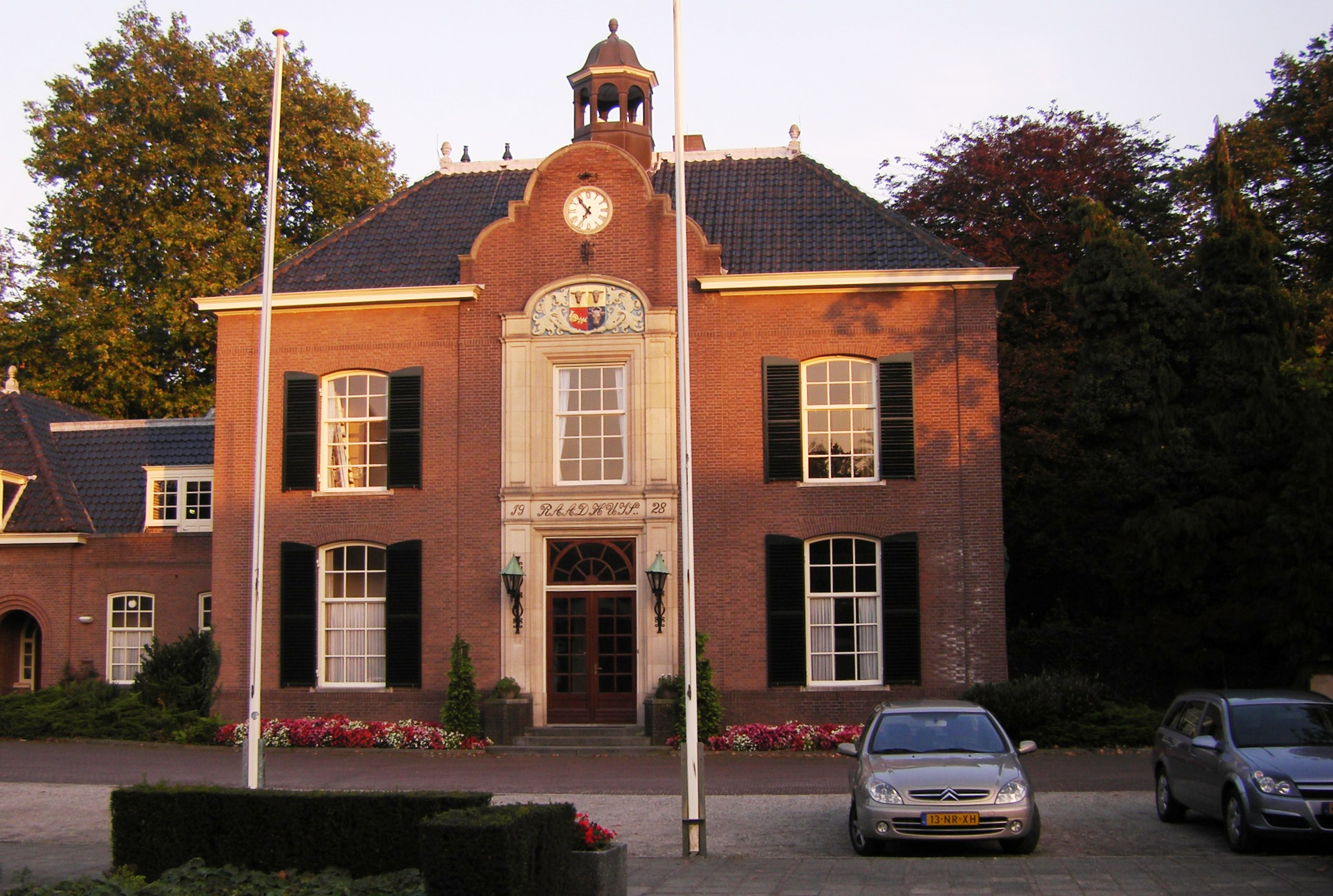
- Heerde town hall

- Flag Coat of arms

- Location in Gelderland
- Coordinates: 52°23′N 6°3′E
- Country: Netherlands
- Province: Gelderland

Government
  - Body: Municipal council
  - Mayor: Olaf Prinsen (D66)

Area
  - Total: 80.42 km^{2} (31.05 sq mi)
  - Land: 78.74 km^{2} (30.40 sq mi)
  - Water: 1.68 km^{2} (0.65 sq mi)
- Elevation: 7 m (23 ft)

Population (January 2021)
  - Total: 18,776
  - Density: 238/km^{2} (620/sq mi)
- Demonym(s): Heerdenaar, Heerder
- Time zone: UTC+1 (CET)
  - Summer (DST): UTC+2 (CEST)
- Postcode: 8180–8194
- Area code: 038, 0578
- Website: www.heerde.nl

Heerde (Dutch pronunciation: [ˈɦeːrdə]) is a municipality and a town in the province of Gelderland, in the eastern Netherlands. Compared to the rest of the Netherlands, Heerde is fairly religious, as are many of the towns and cities in the Veluwe region.

== Population centres ==
- Heerde
- Hoorn
- Veessen
- Vorchten
- Wapenveld

== Politics ==
The Heerde municipal council consists of 17 seats, which since the 2026 municipal elections have been divided as follows:

- Municipal Interest Farmers Party, Heerde - 6 seats
- CDA - 3 seats
- CU-SGP - 3 seats
- GL-PvdA - 2 seats
- VVD - 2 seats
- D66 - 1 seat

== Sport ==
The municipality has five amateur soccer clubs: vv Heerde, SEH, WZC Wapenveld, vv Wapenveld and Vevo.

== Topography ==
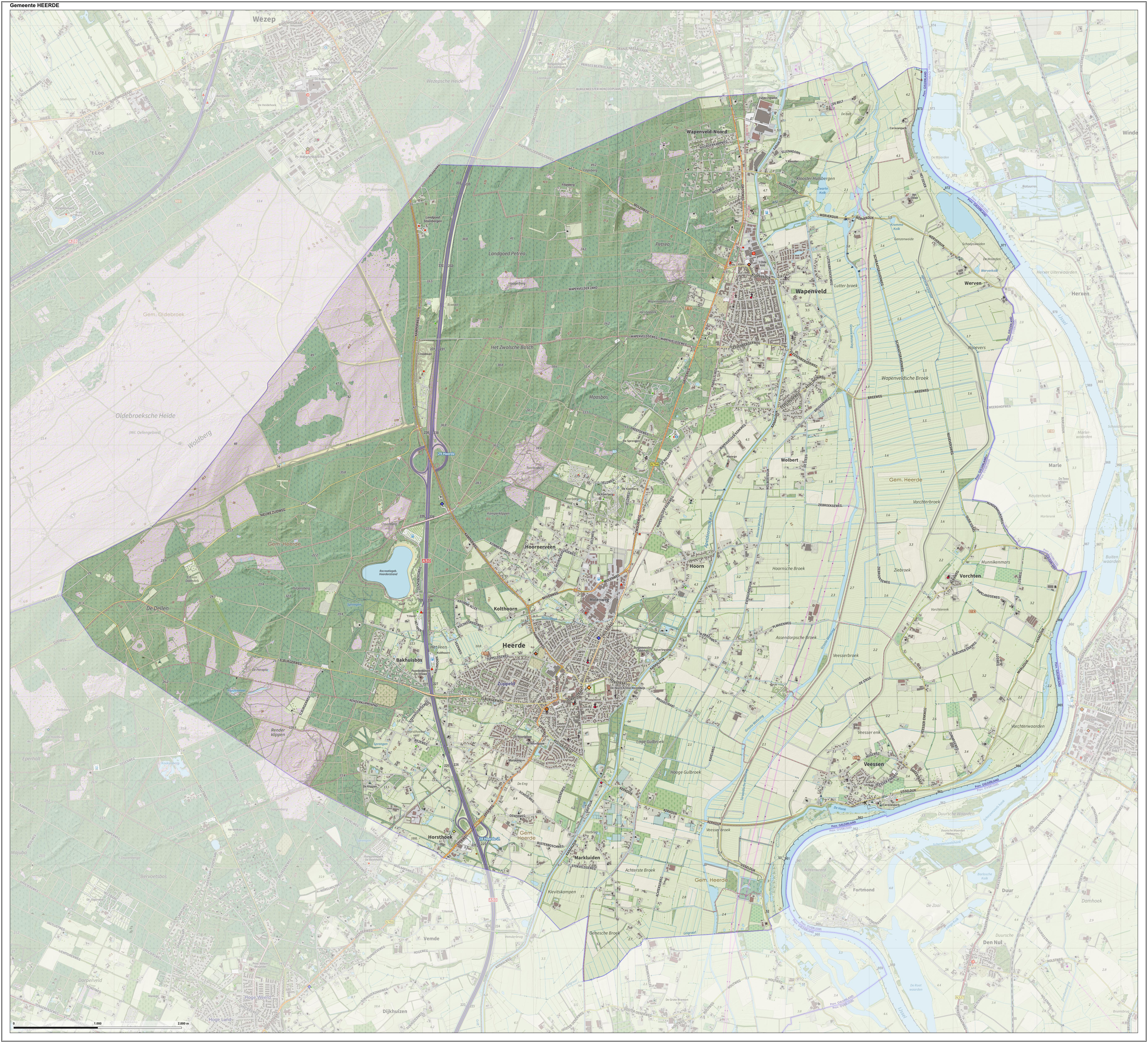
Map of the municipality of Heerde, June 2015.

== Notable residents ==
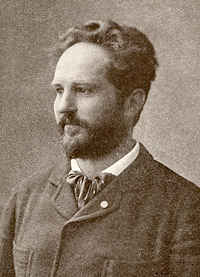
Daan de Clercq

- Daniël de Clercq (1854 in Heerde – 1931) a socialist and activist
- Hendrik Jan van Duren (1937 in Heerde – 2008) a politician.
- Marijke Abels (born 1948 in Deventer) a visual artist, one of her sculptures is at the roundabout of the A50 junction in Heerde

=== Sport ===
- Jaap Zielhuis (born 1966 in Heerde) a sailor, competed at the 2004 Summer Olympics
- Jacco Eltingh (born 1970 in Heerde) a former professional tennis player
- Gerard van Velde (born 1971 in Wapenveld) a Dutch retired speed skating sprinter, gold medallist in the 2002 Winter Olympics

== Gallery ==
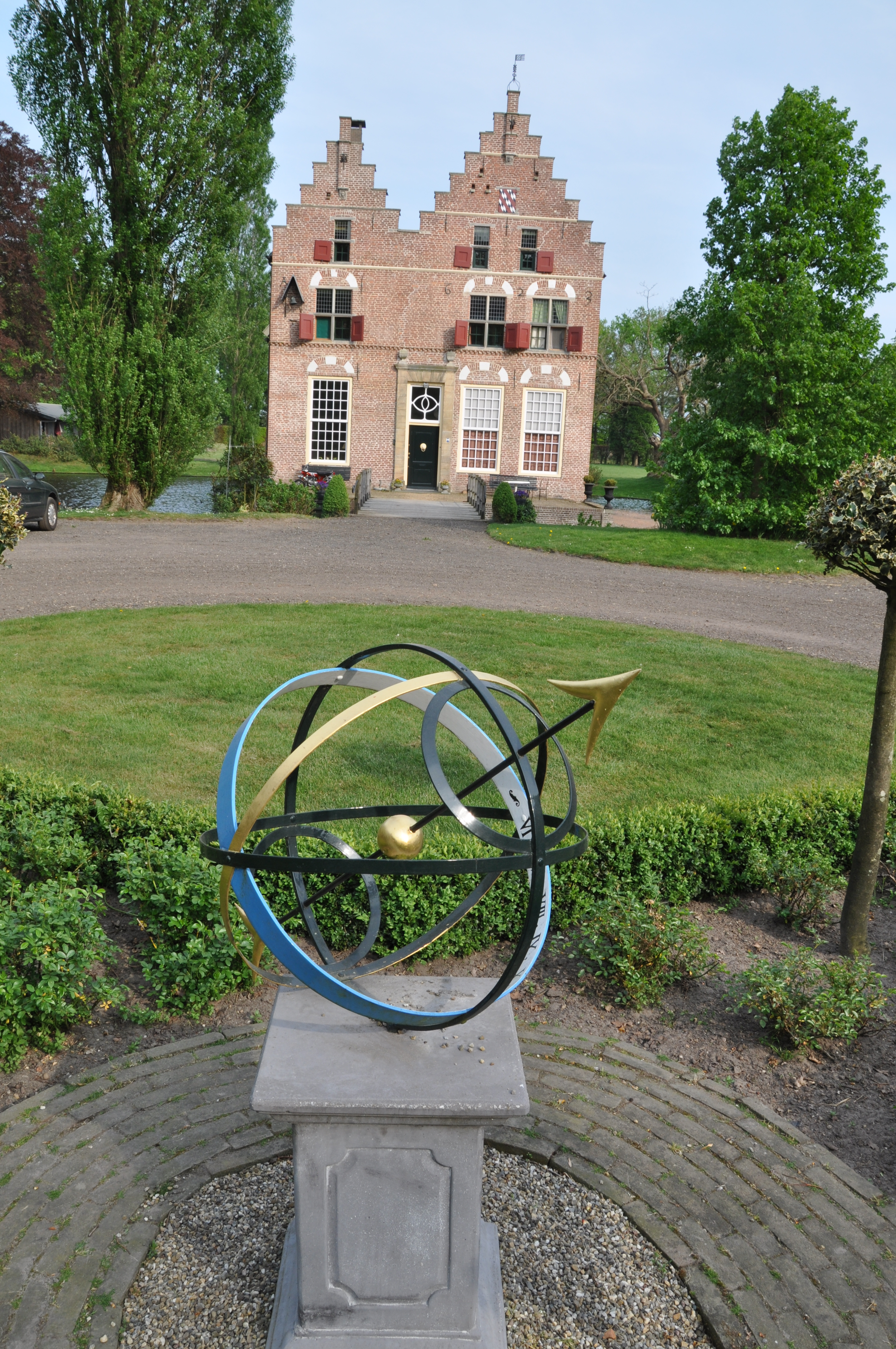
Heerde - Huis Vosbergen - sundial

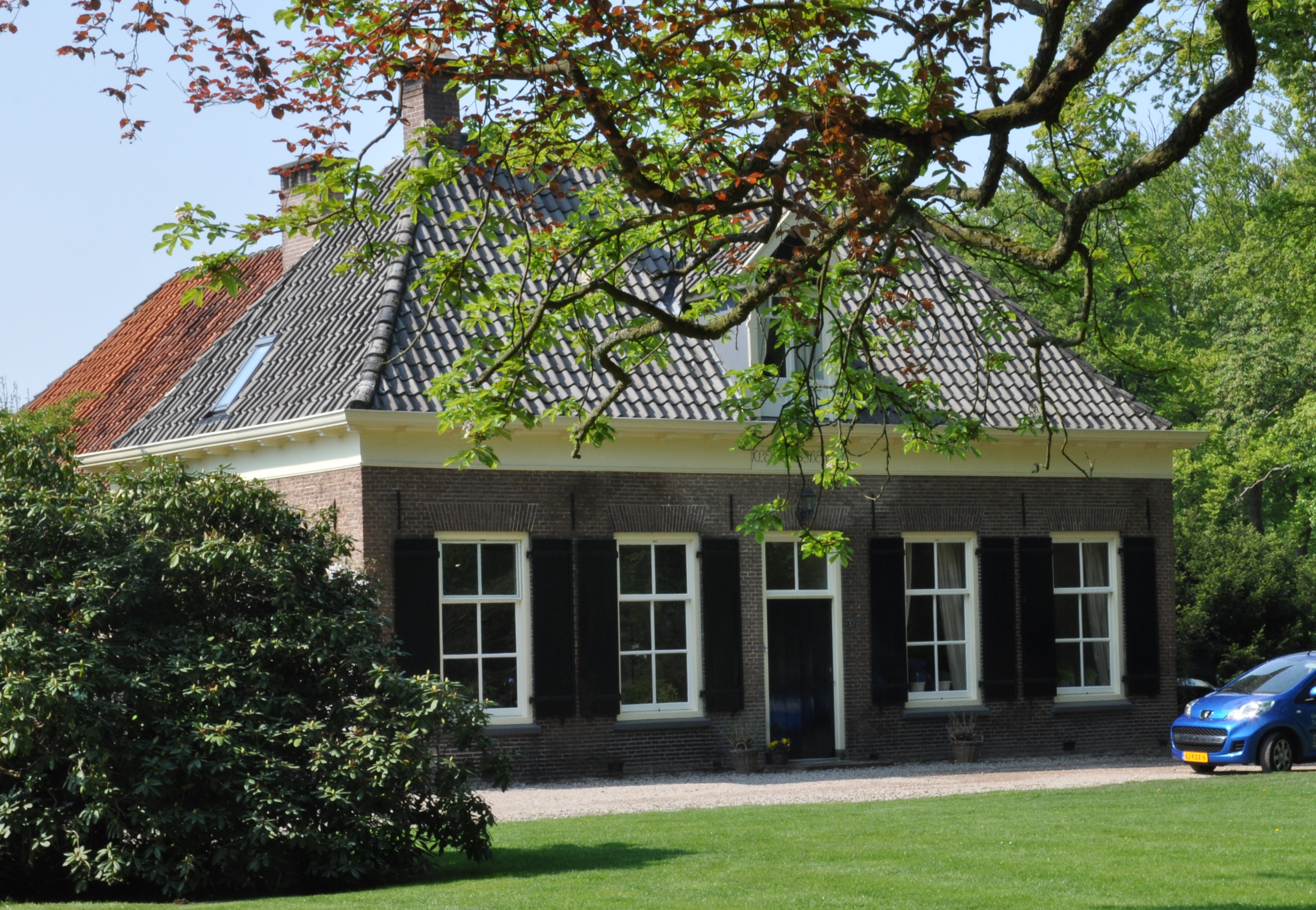
Heerde, Farm at Boerderij Vosbergerweg

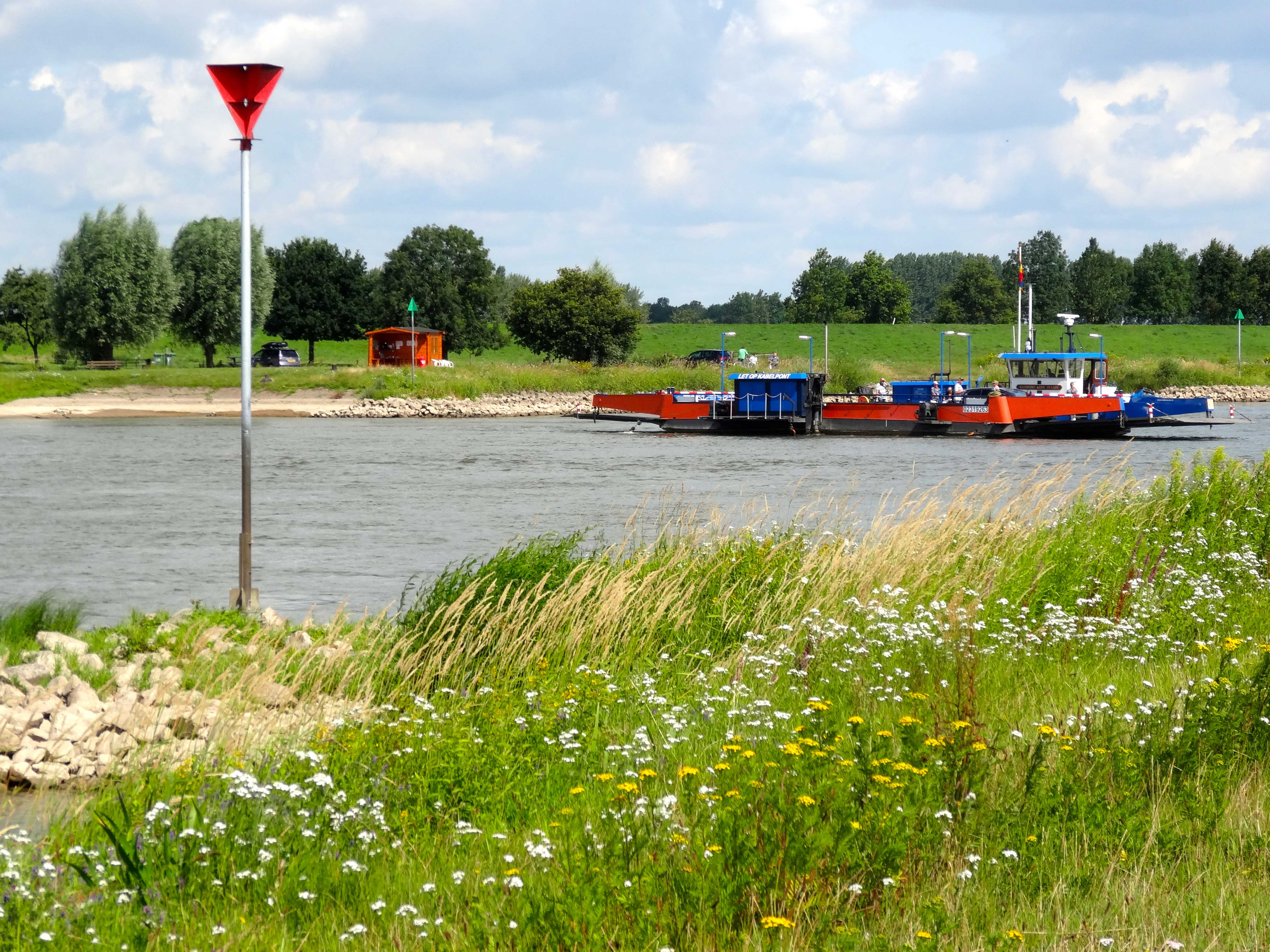
Wijhese ferry over the IJssel

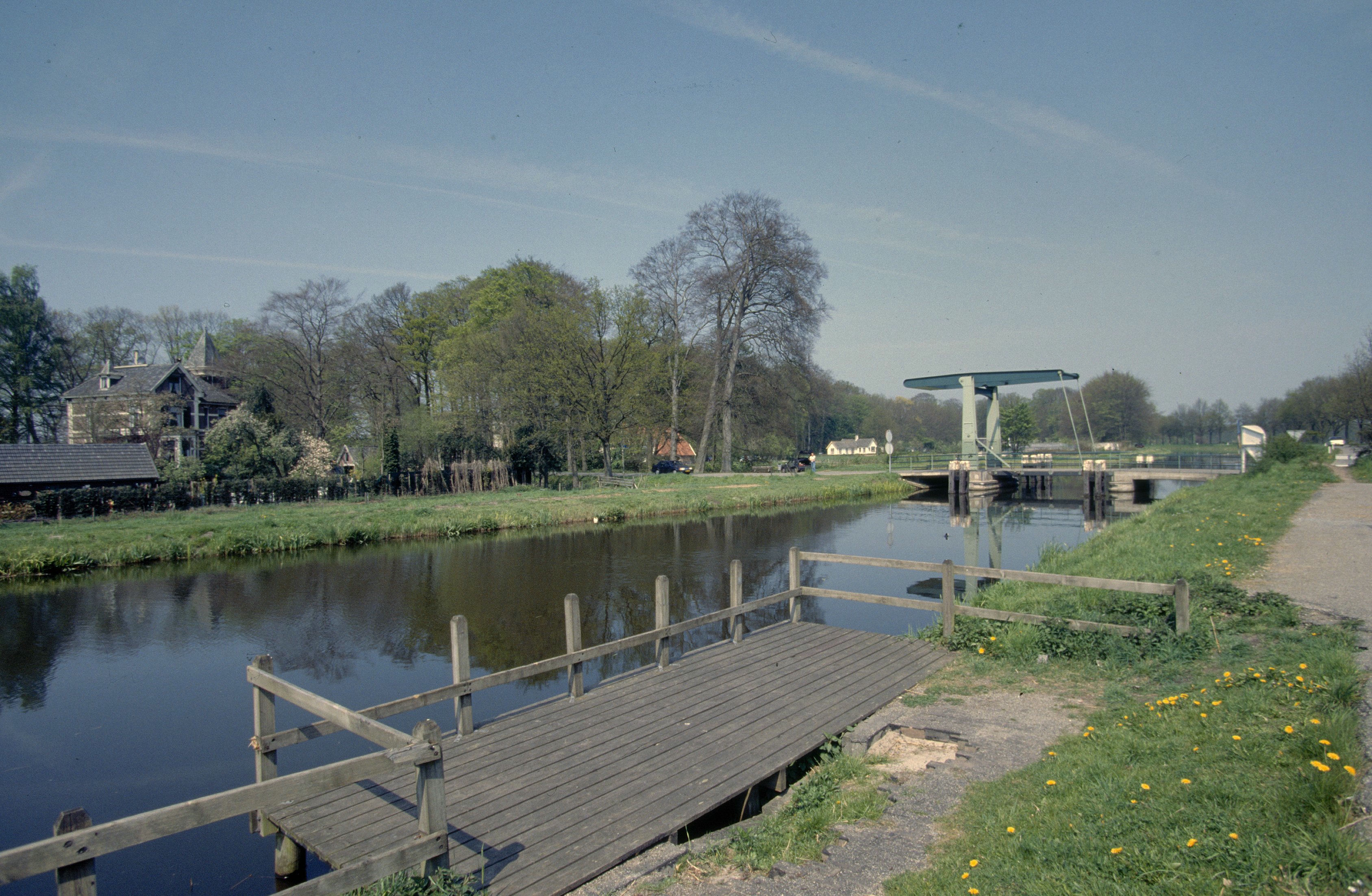
Apeldoorn Canal: view at Bonenbergerbrug - Heerde
