= Divadlo za branou (opera) =

Divadlo za bránou (The Theatre beyond the Gate, H.251, sometimes translated as The Suburban Theatre) is a 1936 stage work in three acts by Bohuslav Martinů with his own libretto; the first act is a ballet pantomime (with no words); acts two and three are entitled opera buffa. The work is a mixture of theatrical styles: ballet and pantomime, opera buffa and folk dance and music from Czechoslovakia. He aimed to employ texts "once the vehicle of genuine folk theatre" to emphasize the theatrical principle rather than what he described as "a musical libretto" where music simply accompanies the nuances of the drama. The title refers to a place of entertainment outside the gates of a city, such as where a travelling troupe might perform.

== Background ==
As well as Czech traditional song text, the work incorporates ideas from Molière's Le Médecin volant and the mime Jean-Gaspard Deburau. The work is an example of the extension of Martinů's operatic technique by using older theatrical traditions, here commedia dell'arte, but is the last of his operatic works to quote Czech folk melodies. It also looks forward to his 1954 opera Mirandolina with its commedia dell’arte elements, two decades later. The composer at first approached a few known writers, including Vítězslav Nezval, who had collaborated with Martinů on his opera The Voice of the Forest, but eventually he set about writing the libretto himself. The genre is not easy to define; after an act of pure dance, the two following combine song and dance in equal measure, and while using Czech folk music, the work both quotes it and makes variations on it. The original choreographer was Ivo Váňa Psota (1908–1952), a former member of the Ballets Russes, who also danced Pierrot.

Commedia dell'arte, describes an Italian comedy of the French type with the characters Pierrot, Colombína and Harlequin. Katuška, the mayor, night-watchman and others are the Czech folklore features mixed with the Commedia dell'arte in the opera buffa, where Martinů's plays with Czech and Moravian folklore plus neoclassical ideas.

Composed in Paris from June 1935 and April 1936, the work was premiered in Brno in 1936. Later performances included a radio recording made in Brno in 1956 with František Jílek conducting, which the composer heard when it was broadcast on the radio on 25 September 1957, listening from his home in Schönenberg in exile in Switzerland.

There was a stage production in Olomouc in 1958 conducted by Iša Krejčí, and another during the 1968–69 season at the National Theatre in Prague conducted by Albert Rosen. The Olomouc production came to Prague for the Martinů centenary celebrations in 1990, where 14 of his 16 operas were given.

A five-movement suite from the opera compiled by Miloš Řiha was recorded by the Brno State Philharmonic Orchestra, conducted by František Jílek, in May 1973, for Supraphon and issued on LP alongside other orchestral music from Martinů operas. In 2019 the 1956 radio broadcast was restored and issued on two CDs.

== Roles ==
Role	Voice type	Dancer (act 1)	Premiere Cast, 20 September 1936 (Conductor: Antonín Balatka)
Kolombína	soprano	Figarova	Věra Strelcová
Harlekýn	tenor	Emerich Gabzdyl	Antonín Pelz
Katuška	mezzo-soprano	–	Marie Řezníčková
Pierrot	baritone	Ivo Váňa-Psota	Géza Fischer
Confectioner	–	Josei Sokol	–
Ponocný (Night-watchman)	bass-baritone	–	Václav Bednář
Starosta (Mayor)	bass	–	Vladimír Jedenáctík
Hospodský (Inn-keeper)	baritone	Otto Strejček	Vlastimil Šíma
Stařec (an old man)	baritone	–	Leonid Pribytkov
Baba-Zaříkávačka (a soothsayer)	contralto	–	Božena Michlová
Chorus: Peasants

== Synopsis ==
The work divides into three acts: the first consists of a ballet-pantomime, the second and the third an opera buffa.

In the first act ('Ballet-pantomime') Pierrot reports the flirtation of Harlequin with Colombine to the latter's father, an innkeeper who drags his daughter back home. Following more byplay, the jealous Pierrot fights with Harlequin, only to be pulled apart by the other dancers. After stealing gingerbread from the confectioner he is roughed up by Pierrot and the inn-keeper. Eventually after more quarrels, the inn-keeper resignedly gives his blessing to Harlequin and Colombina.

The second and third acts, using lyrics of folk songs depict the mayor this time trying to abduct Colombina, hoping to bribe the night-watchman to help him. Pierrot is still jealous and flirts with Colombina, but after further plots and ruses, Pierrot falls into a duckpond, and then everyone gets drenched in a downpour – upon which the act ends in praise of rain, that gives a good harvest. In the third act, the mayor and night-watchman are still plotting but are overheard by Katuška and Pierrot, who with Harlequin and Colombina devise a plan to thwart them by staging a play with a false doctor (Pierrot) tending a sick Colombina. When the inn-keeper spots the likeness of Pierrot and the pseudo doctor the plot unravels, but not before the mayor and night-watchman are scared by the four lovers as ghosts. Eventually the innkeeper bows to the marriages of Harlequin with his daughter Colombina and Pierrot with his maid Katuška.
