= Marieke Verbiesen =

Dutch new media artist

- Education: Frank Mohr Institute
- Known for: New media, digital art
- Notable work: 2 Player Unvirtual Playground, Plan 10, Mayhem Machine
- Movement: digital art, New media

Marieke Verbiesen is a Dutch new media artist based in Bergen, Norway. She creates interactive installations and performances using experimental animation, exhibited and screened at various festivals, museums, cinema's, artspaces, galleries and public spaces. She has previously and currently works as Advisor in Art and Technology at the Bergen Centre for Electronic Arts and has previously worked at Harvestworks.

== Works ==
=== Loud Matter ===
Loud Matter is a live audiovisual performance that incorporates real-time stop motion animation, drums, livecode and 8-bit chiptune music.

=== Pole Position ===
Pole Position is a handcrafted and lo-fi interpretation interactive installation of Pole Position, a racing video games released in 1982 by Namco on the Atari 2600.

=== 2 Player Unvirtual Playground ===
2 Player Unvirtual Playground 2 Player Unvirtual Playground is a large scale public participatory sculpture consisting a live play environment for two players. It features moving objects and top projected lights that are responsive to each player, in relation to their position on the playground, and subsequent gameplay progression in realtime. As a sculpture, it is a tactile translation of a digital framework created in the procedural game environment Minecraft.

=== Cosmic Jungle ===
Cosmic Jungle is a Cinematic Interactive Installation that combines audience participation in conjunction with both classic and novel film techniques, creating a reallife moving Filmset. Visitors play the main role in this installation, and find themselves inside a filmset surrounded by cameras and lights, projected into a world that consists of otherworldly creatures, Unidentief Flying Objects and other surreal events. By using motion control techniques, visitors are controlling the events that unfold around them by moving in front of the camera.
