= Schönenberg, Zürich =

Schönenberg
- Former municipality
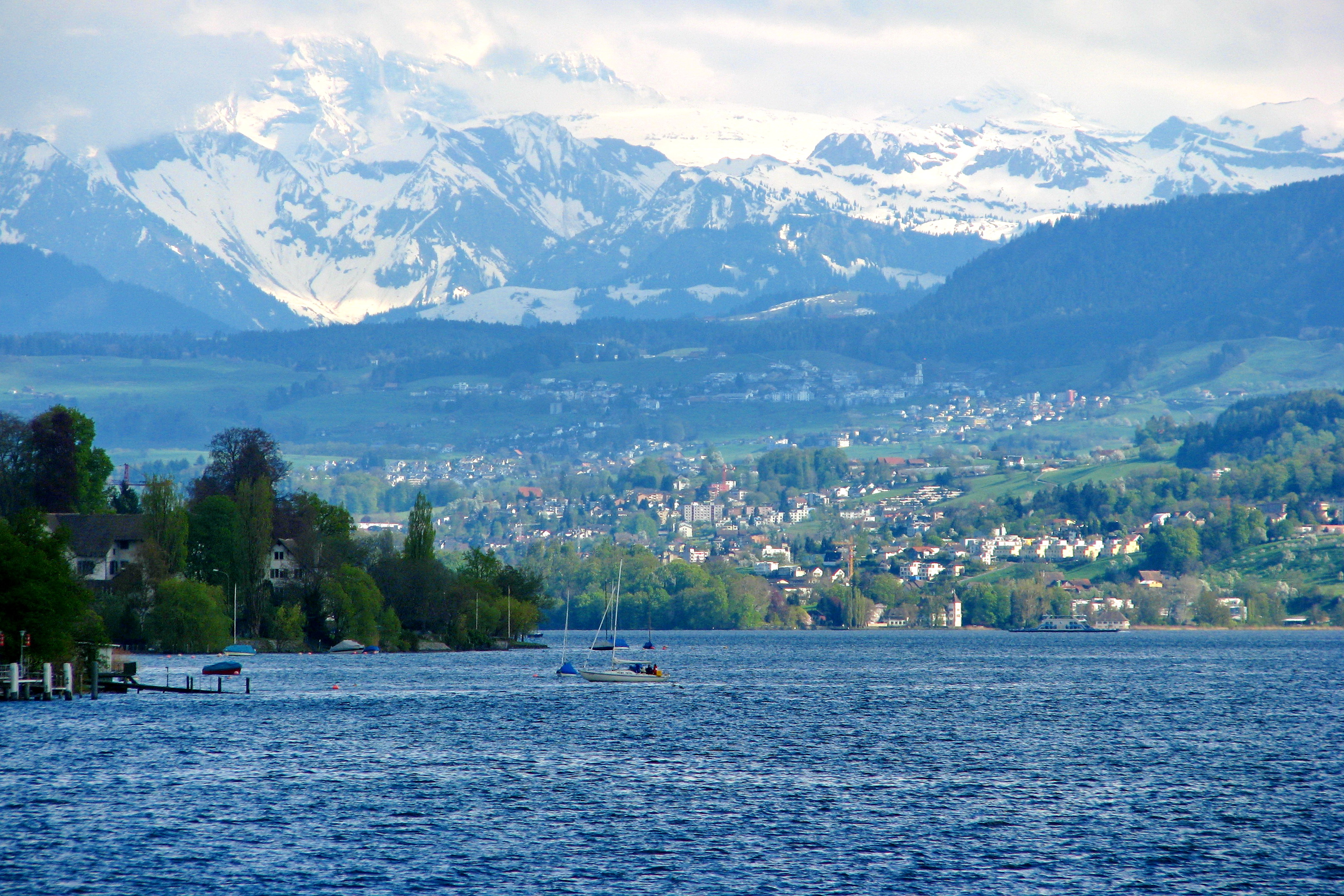

- Flag Coat of arms
- Location of Schönenberg
- Location within Switzerland Location within Canton of Zurich
- Coordinates: 47°12′N 8°39′E
- Country: Switzerland
- Canton: Zurich
- District: Horgen

Area
  - Total: 11.00 km^{2} (4.25 sq mi)
- Elevation: 714 m (2,343 ft)

Population (December 2020)
  - Total: 1,832
  - Density: 166.5/km^{2} (431.4/sq mi)
- Time zone: UTC+01:00 (CET)
  - Summer (DST): UTC+02:00 (CEST)
- Postal code: 8824
- SFOS number: 140
- ISO 3166 code: CH-ZH
- Surrounded by: Hirzel, Hütten, Menzingen (ZG), Richterswil, Wädenswil
- Website: www.schoenenberg.ch

Schönenberg (Swiss Standard German pronunciation: [ˈʃøːnənbɛrɡ]; Alemannic German pronunciation: [ˈʃøːnəbɛrg]) is a former municipality in the district of Horgen in the canton of Zürich in Switzerland. On 1 January 2019 the former municipalities of Hütten and Schönenberg merged into the municipality of Wädenswil.

== Geography ==
Aerial view from 1500 m by Walter Mittelholzer (1924)

Schönenberg has an area of 11 km^{2} (4.2 sq mi). Of this area, 77.1% is used for agricultural purposes, while 11.3% is forested. Of the rest of the land, 9.2% is settled (buildings or roads) and the remainder (2.4%) is non-productive (rivers, glaciers or mountains). In 1996 housing and buildings made up 7% of the total area, while transportation infrastructure made up the rest (2.2%). Of the total unproductive area, water (streams and lakes) made up 1.3% of the area. As of 2007 3.2% of the total municipal area was undergoing some type of construction.

Teufenbachweiher is a reservoir on the Teufenbach creek.

== Demographics ==
Schönenberg has a population (as of 31 December 2020) of 1,832. As of 2007, 8.9% of the population was made up of foreign nationals. As of 2008 the gender distribution of the population was 49.6% male and 50.4% female. Over the last 10 years the population has grown at a rate of 11.6%. Most of the population (as of 2000) speaks German (96.5%), with French being second most common ( 0.8%) and English being third ( 0.8%).

In the 2007 election the most popular party was the SVP which received 49.8% of the vote. The next three most popular parties were the FDP (13.3%), the SPS (10.2%) and the CSP (9.2%).

The age distribution of the population (as of 2000) is children and teenagers (0–19 years old) make up 26.1% of the population, while adults (20–64 years old) make up 60.3% and seniors (over 64 years old) make up 13.7%. In Schönenberg about 81% of the population (between age 25-64) have completed either non-mandatory upper secondary education or additional higher education (either university or a Fachhochschule). There are 670 households in Schönenberg.

Schönenberg has an unemployment rate of 1.05%. As of 2005, there were 167 people employed in the primary economic sector and about 58 businesses involved in this sector. 103 people are employed in the secondary sector and there are 19 businesses in this sector. 232 people are employed in the tertiary sector, with 58 businesses in this sector. As of 2007 37.2% of the working population were employed full-time, and 62.8% were employed part-time.

As of 2008 there were 595 Catholics and 975 Protestants in Schönenberg. In the 2000 census, religion was broken down into several smaller categories. From the census, 57.1% were some type of Protestant, with 54.5% belonging to the Swiss Reformed Church and 2.6% belonging to other Protestant churches. 30.7% of the population were Catholic. Of the rest of the population, 0% were Muslim, 1.4% belonged to another religion (not listed), 1.8% did not give a religion, and 8.8% were atheist or agnostic.

== Transportation ==
The Zimmerberg bus line (Zimmerbergbus), provided by the Sihltal Zürich Uetliberg Bahn (SZU), connects the Zimmerberg region and parts of the Sihl valley. There is also two Postauto routes(150, 160) connecting Schönenberg with the rest of the ZVV network.
