= Marieke Lettink =

New Zealand ecologist and herpetologist

Marieke Lettink is a New Zealand herpetologist.

== Biography ==
Lettink holds a master's in science from the University of Canterbury, and a postgraduate diploma in wildlife management and a PhD in Zoology both from the University of Otago.

She is a member of the Department of Conservation's Lizard Technical Advisory Group, a council member of the Society for Research of Amphibians and Reptiles of New Zealand (SRARNZ), and the Canterbury representative to the New Zealand Herpetological Society.

== Publications ==
- Lettink, M. & Whitaker, A. H. (2004). Lizards of Banks Peninsula. Christchurch [N.Z.] Dept. of Conservation
- Lettink, M. (2005). Attracting lizards to your garden: Options for Canterbury. Christchurch [N.Z}.: Dept. of Conservation
