= Wapenveld =

- Village
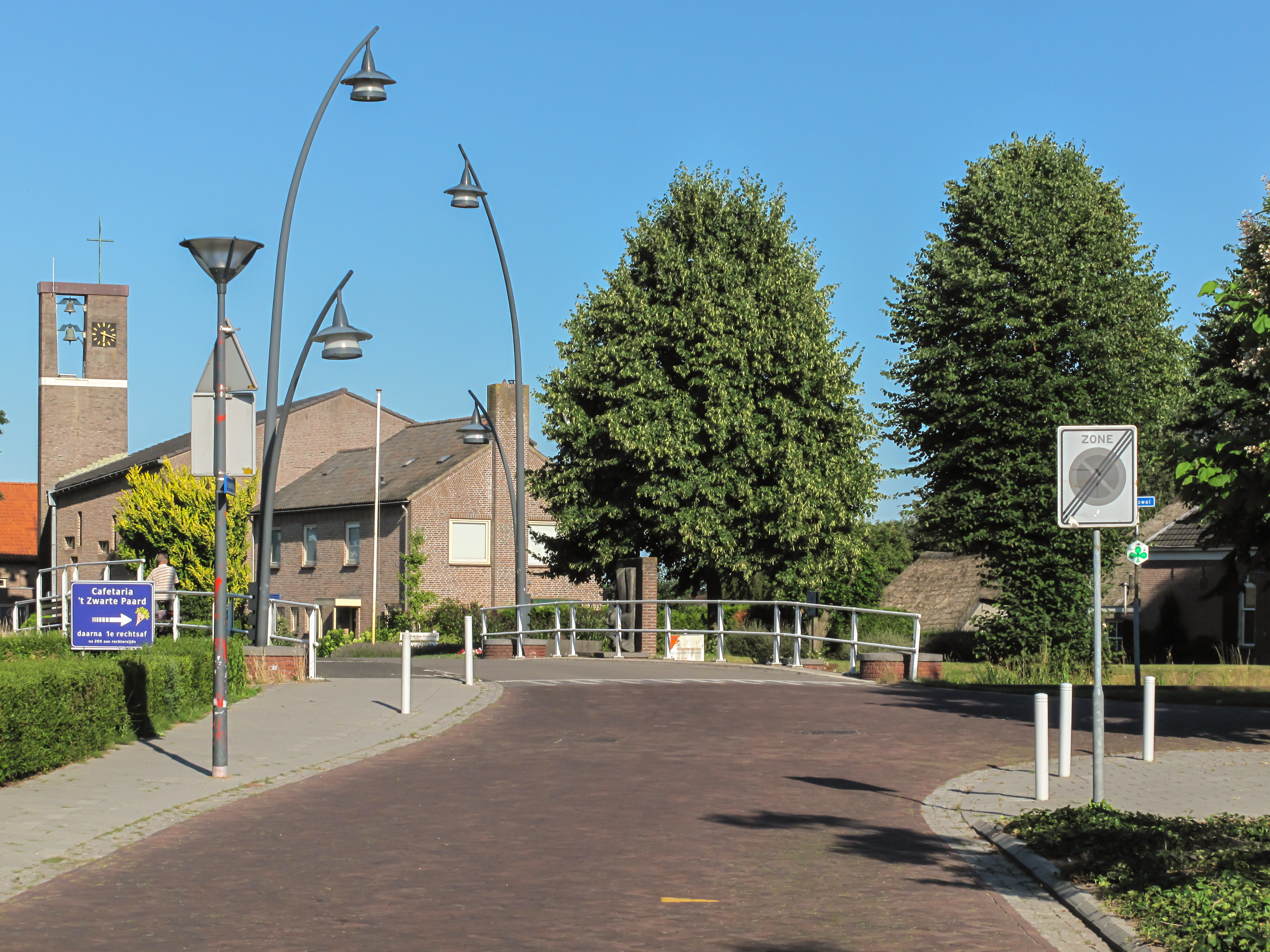
- Church street

- Location in the province of Gelderland in the Netherlands Wapenveld (Netherlands)
- Coordinates: 52°25′40″N 6°4′19″E
- Country: Netherlands
- Province: Gelderland
- Municipality: Heerde

Area
  - Total: 29.73 km^{2} (11.48 sq mi)
- Elevation: 5.2 m (17 ft)

Population (2021)
  - Total: 6,260
  - Density: 211/km^{2} (545/sq mi)
- Time zone: UTC+1 (CET)
  - Summer (DST): UTC+2 (CEST)
- Postal code: 8191
- Dialing code: 038

Wapenveld is a village in the eastern Netherlands. It is located in the municipality of Heerde, Gelderland, about 10 km from Zwolle and 100 km from Amsterdam.

The village with 6,000 inhabitants, is situated where the valley of the river IJssel meets the Veluwe woods. The Apeldoornse kanaal, which once was used by ships to shortcut the IJssel, runs right through it.

The people of Wapenveld earn their living from agriculture (mainly cattle) and industry, mainly AKZO Nobel. Until 2008, Wapenveld was also home to the Berghuizer paper factory.

A notable person born in Wapenveld is the speedskater Gerard van Velde.

== Gallery ==
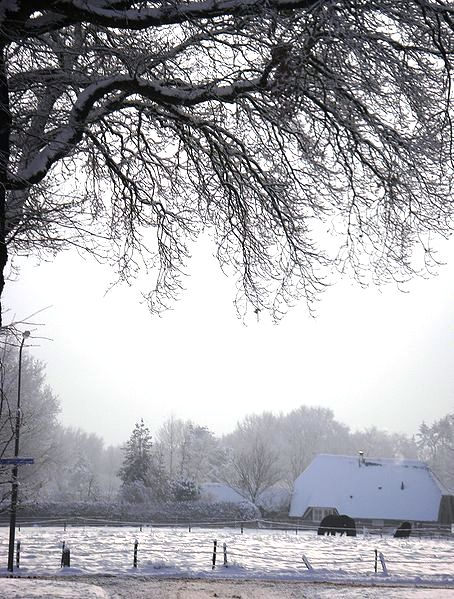
Winter in Wapenveld

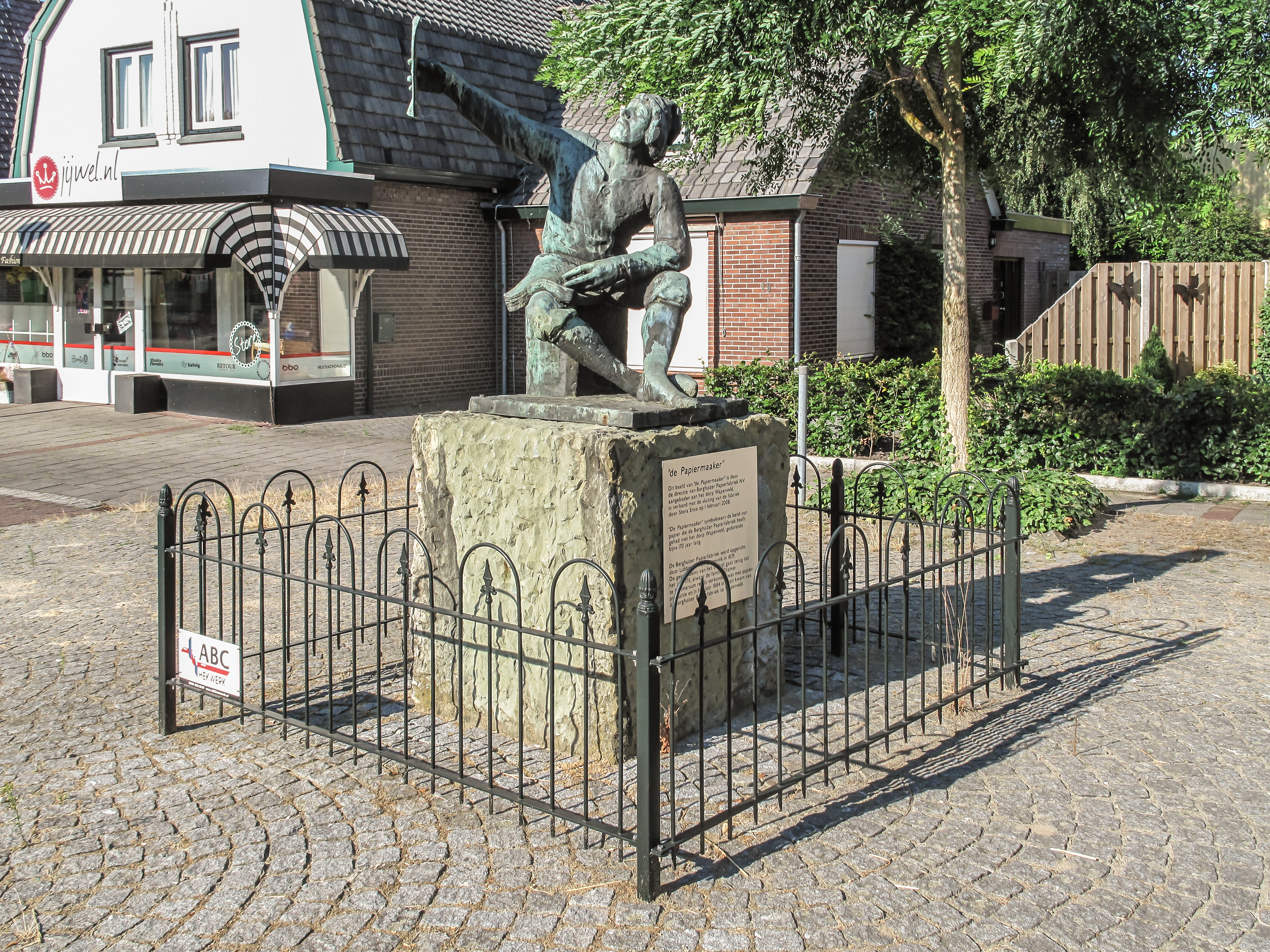
Sculpture: de Papiermaker van Berghuizer Papierfabriek

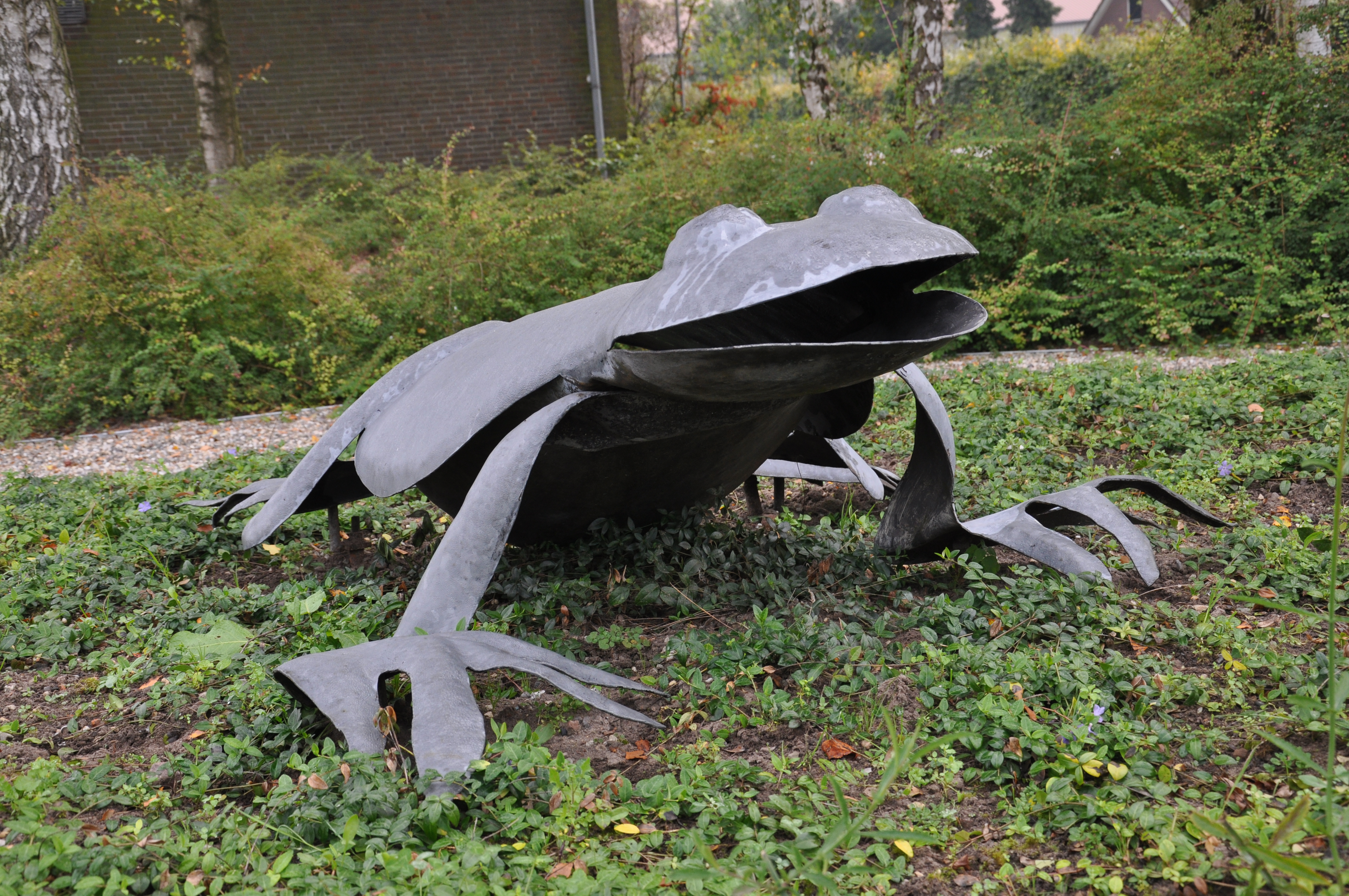
Toad sculpture

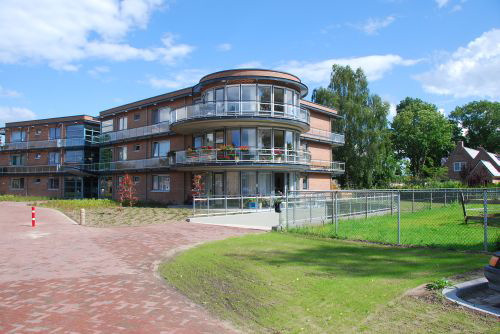
Apartment buildings
