= The Gang of Oss =

2011 film

- Film poster
- Dutch: De Bende van Oss
- Directed by: André van Duren
- Screenplay by: Paul Jan Nelissen; André van Duren
- Story by: André van Duren
- Produced by: Guurtje Buddenberg; Matthijs van Heijningen
- Starring: Sylvia Hoeks; Matthias Schoenaerts; Frank Lammers
- Cinematography: Piotr Kukla
- Edited by: Ad Rietvelt
- Music by: Paleis van Boem
- Production company: Sigma Pictures Productions
- Distributed by: Entertainment One Benelux
- Release date: 21 September 2011 (Nederlands Film Festival)
- Running time: 112 minutes
- Country: Netherlands
- Language: Dutch
- Budget: €2.9 million
- Box office: $1,2 million

The Gang of Oss (Dutch: De Bende van Oss) is a 2011 Dutch crime drama period film directed by André van Duren starring Sylvia Hoeks and Matthias Schoenaerts. It tells the story of a woman involved with the criminal gangs of the town of Oss in the Netherlands in the 1930s. The film is partly based on real events.

The film won the Golden Film award after selling over 100,000 tickets at the box office.

== Cast ==
- Sylvia Hoeks as Johanna van Heesch
- Matthias Schoenaerts as Ties van Heesch
- Pierre Bokma as Sal Hedeman
- Frank Lammers as Harry den Brock
- Daan Schuurmans as Wachtmeester Roelofse
- Marcel Musters as Wim de Kuiper
- Theo Maassen as Van Schijndel
- Maria Kraakman as Trees Biemans
- Benja Bruijning as Jan
- Elle van Rijn as Ellie
