= Marike Forest Park =

Forest park in the Gambia

- IUCN category IV (habitat/species management area)
- Interactive map of Marike Forest Park
- Location: North Bank Division Gambia
- Nearest city: Kerewan
- Coordinates: 13°28′26″N 16°4′36″W
- Area: 174 ha (430 acres)
- Established: January 1, 1954

Marike Forest Park is a forest park, and is located in North Bank in the Gambia. Established on January 1, 1954, it covers 174 hectares.

Marike Forest Park has an elevation of 17 metres.
