= Mariken van Nieumeghen =

16th century Dutch miracle story of Mariken

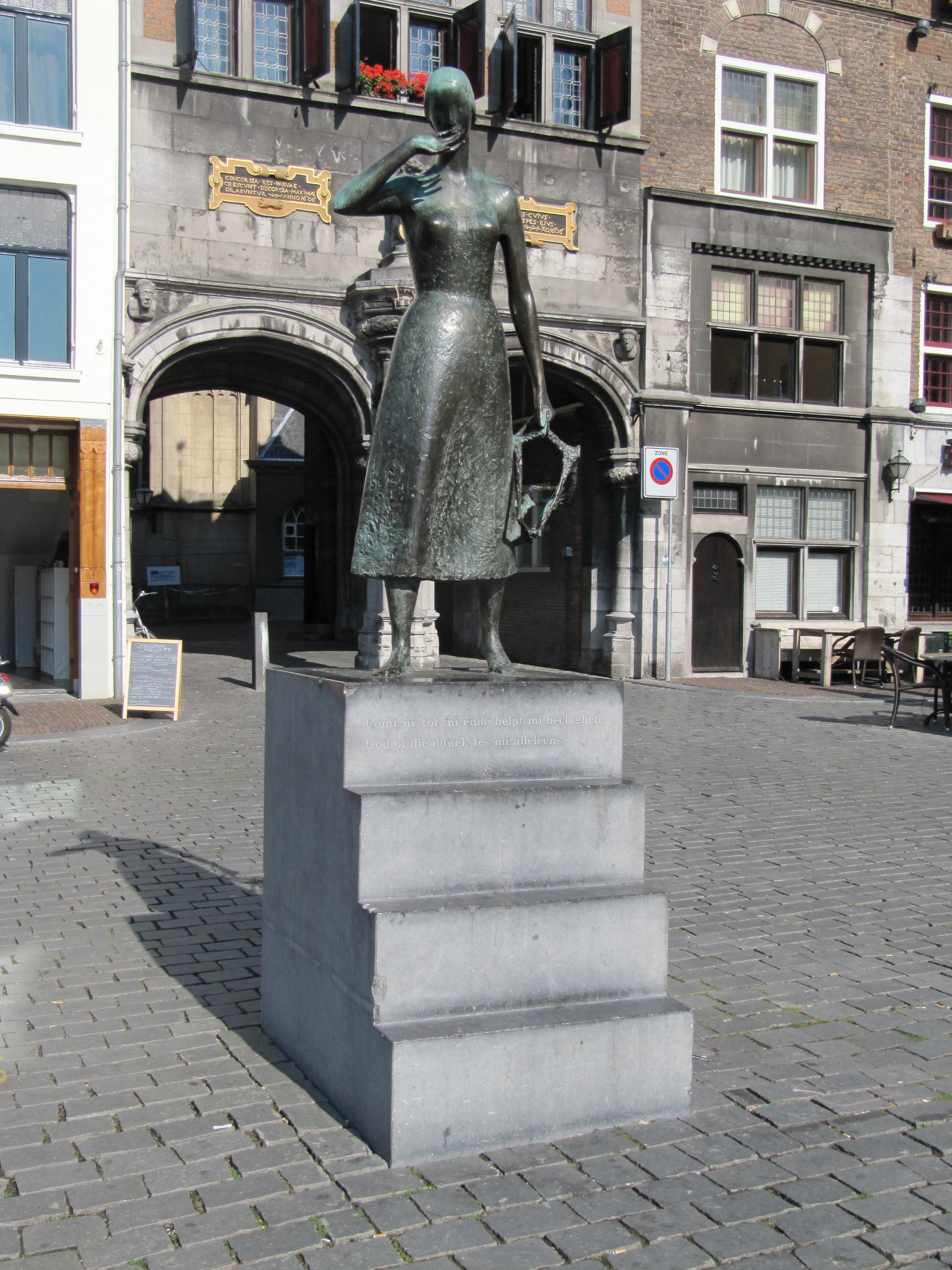
Statue of Mariken in Nijmegen

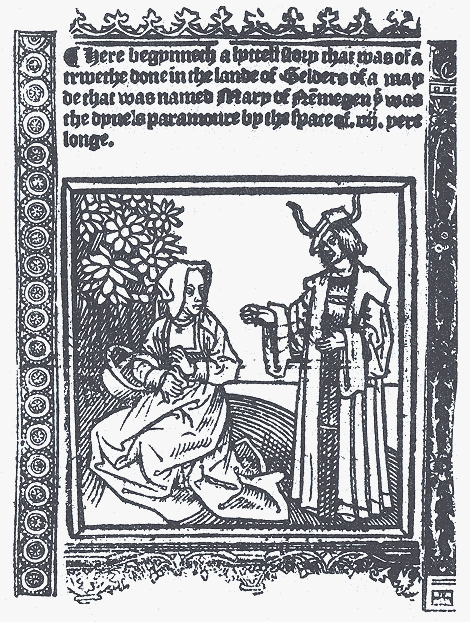
Title page of Mariken van Nieumeghen, published ca. 1518 in Antwerp.

Mariken van Nieumeghen ("Mary of Nijmegen") is a miracle play recorded in a Middle Dutch text from the early 16th century. The protagonist Mariken of the story spends seven years with the devil, after which she is miraculously released. The oldest edition dates from 1515 and was printed by Willem Vorsterman. Linguistic evidence suggests it was written by a poet from an Antwerp chamber of rhetoric.

== Themes and genre ==
Like the fourteenth-century Beatrijs, the story involves a beautiful young woman who is seduced, but unlike that poem Mariken has a lively, "Burgundian" style in often lower-class language, as opposed to the courtly elegance of the Beatrijs.

Though the story is often called a miracle play, Dirk Coigneau, in his 2002 edition, argues that the story was not intended as a drama; he likens its organization (the text is separated into sections where verse dialogues are preceded by prose introductions) to that of a prose novel.

== History ==
The earliest known version, printed in 1515 in Antwerp (found in the Bavarian State Library, Munich) is designated A. The story was popular enough to become widespread very quickly. An English translation was printed by Antwerp printer Jan van Doesborch, as Mary of Nemmegen in the early-sixteenth century--this manuscript is usually designated D. The actual origins of the story are not well known, though in 2009 Dirk Coigneau proposed that it may originate in Syria, claiming as evidence a sixth-century novella about Saint Abraham the Great of Kashkar, a text which Coigneau claims shows many similarities with the Mariken.

== Later translations and adaptations ==
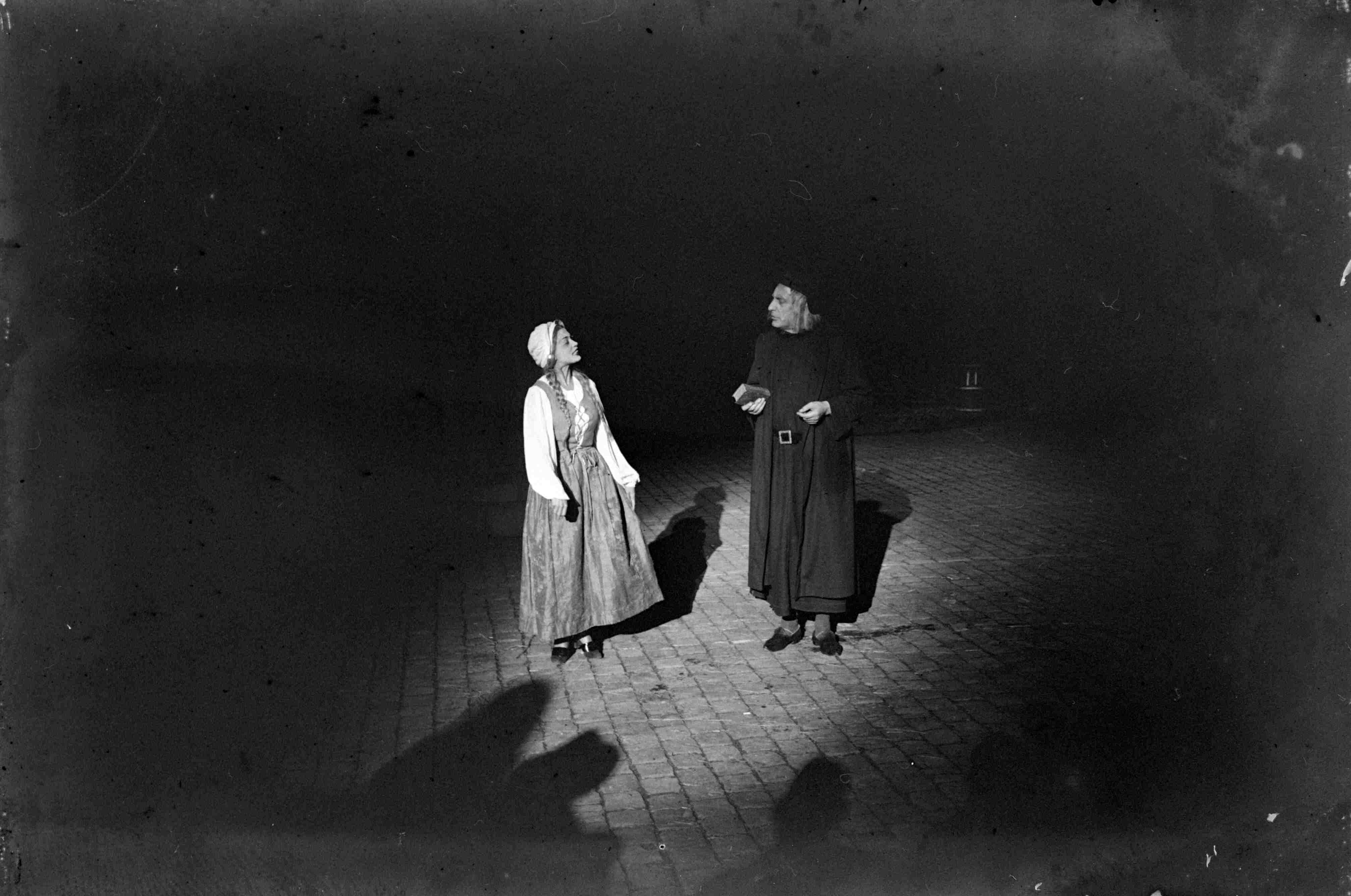
From a 1950 outdoor production

A Latin version was included by Hadrianus Lyraeus in his Trisagion Marianum (1648), and ended up in the Italian book Sabati del Giesù di Roma by P. Joannes Rho (1655), from which it traveled to the Marianischer Gnaden- und Wunderschatz (Augsburg 1737) and finally in Alphonsus Maria de Liguori's Italian Glorie di Maria (1750). Luise von Ploennies made a German Faust out of her (1853). Eugen d'Albert wrote an opera in 1923 (libretto by Herbert Alberti), Mareike von Nymwegen, in 1923. The story of Mariken is part of Bohuslav Martinů's opera cycle "Hry o Marii" (1935) in Czech translation.The book was translated into German (1918 and 1950), English (1924), French (1929), and Norwegian (1975), and adapted for radio in Afrikaans.

The story was popular in the Middle East as well. In 2008, Herman Teule, professor of Eastern Christianity at Radboud University Nijmegen, discovered an 1821 translation in Syrian, which turned out to be a popular translation of an Italian version, distributed by Christian missionaries.

The story has been adapted for film twice, in 1974 by Jos Stelling and in 2000 by André van Duren, the latter based on a Peter van Gestel's adaptation of the story in children's book Mariken.
