= Maria Mattheussens-Fikkers =

Dutch field hockey player

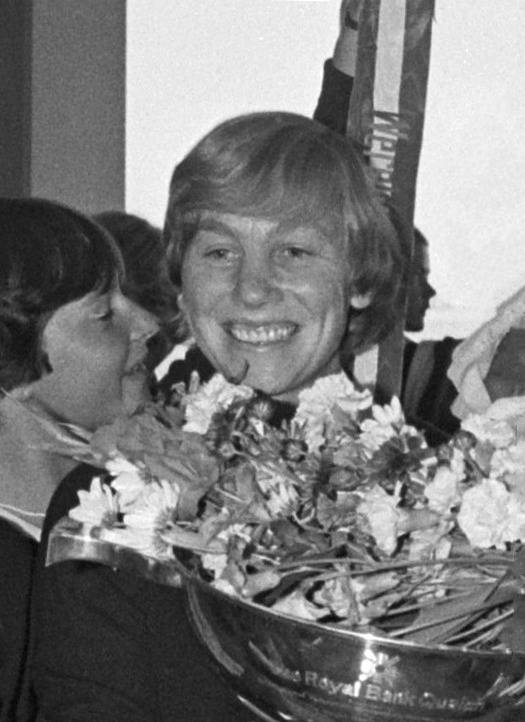
- Maria Mattheussens-Fikkers in 1979

Personal information
- Born: 31 October 1949 (age 76) Bergen op Zoom

Sport
- Sport: Field hockey
Medal record
Representing the Netherlands
Hockey World Cup
Bronze medal – third place	1976 Berlin	Team
Gold medal – first place	1978 Madrid	Team

Maria Mattheussens-Fikkers is a retired field hockey player from the Netherlands. Together with the Dutch team she won a bronze and a gold medal at the 1976 and 1978 World Cups, respectively.

Her daughter, Marieke Veenhoven-Mattheussens (born 1984), also competed internationally in field hockey.
