= Marieke van Amerom =

Dutch painter and draftsman

Marieke van Amerom (born January 25, 1942) is a painter and draftsman from Alphen aan den Rijn.

Van Amerong's drawings are narrative and inspired by her lively nocturnal dream life. She writes down her dreams in the morning and then draws them on paper. Her preferred mediums include Indian ink, pen, and brush, sometimes with color accents. This is a daily routine for her that gives her inspiration and ideas for other work.

== Career ==
Van Amerom trained at the Academy of Visual Arts, later followed by a post-academy year at the Willem de Kooning Academy and Master classes with Theo Jansen, Peter Struycken and Herman Makking.

Since 1966 she has lived in Alphen.

Van Amerong was involved in the Literary Café of Alphen aan den Rijn and was co-founder of the Alphen Ateliers Foundation (STA-ART) in 1987. STA-ART had been established on the initiative of fellow Van Amerongen because, as a foundation, they would have more weight than a group of individual artists in their then struggle for their own studios.

Her work has been exhibited widely, both in the Netherlands and abroad, such as in St. Petersburg, Tallinn, Perugia and Murcia.

In Alphen, her work has been shown during open studio days, Art Relays and projects, such as "Travel companions" and "Then and Now". In 1996 she was nominated for the Kunstprijs Stad Gouda. There she also participated in the exhibition "Male Nude". Painting from nude models she continued to do until 2008, which led, among other things, to a retrospective exhibition at the Garenspinnerij in Gouda.
