= Marijke Abels =

Dutch artist and instructor (born 1948)

- Born: July 30, 1948 (age 77); Deventer, Netherlands

Marijke Abels (born July 30, 1948) is a Dutch visual artist and instructor.

== Life and work ==
Abels was born in Deventer. She creates sculptures of bronze, paper, and photographs. Her work follows the theme of "the complex relationship between humans and animals."

She studied at the Vrije Academie voor Beeldende Kunsten in Nunspeet, Netherlands, where she received formal training in the art of sculpture. Abels was asked to contribute to an exhibition in Heerde in honor of the discovery of Venus of Heerde, a Roman figurine that was found in the area in 1985 and is now on display in the Museum Het Valkhof in Nijmegen. However, after a protest from the ChristenUnie/SGP, the plan was abandoned, ostensibly due to worry about the theft of the bronze in the sculptures.

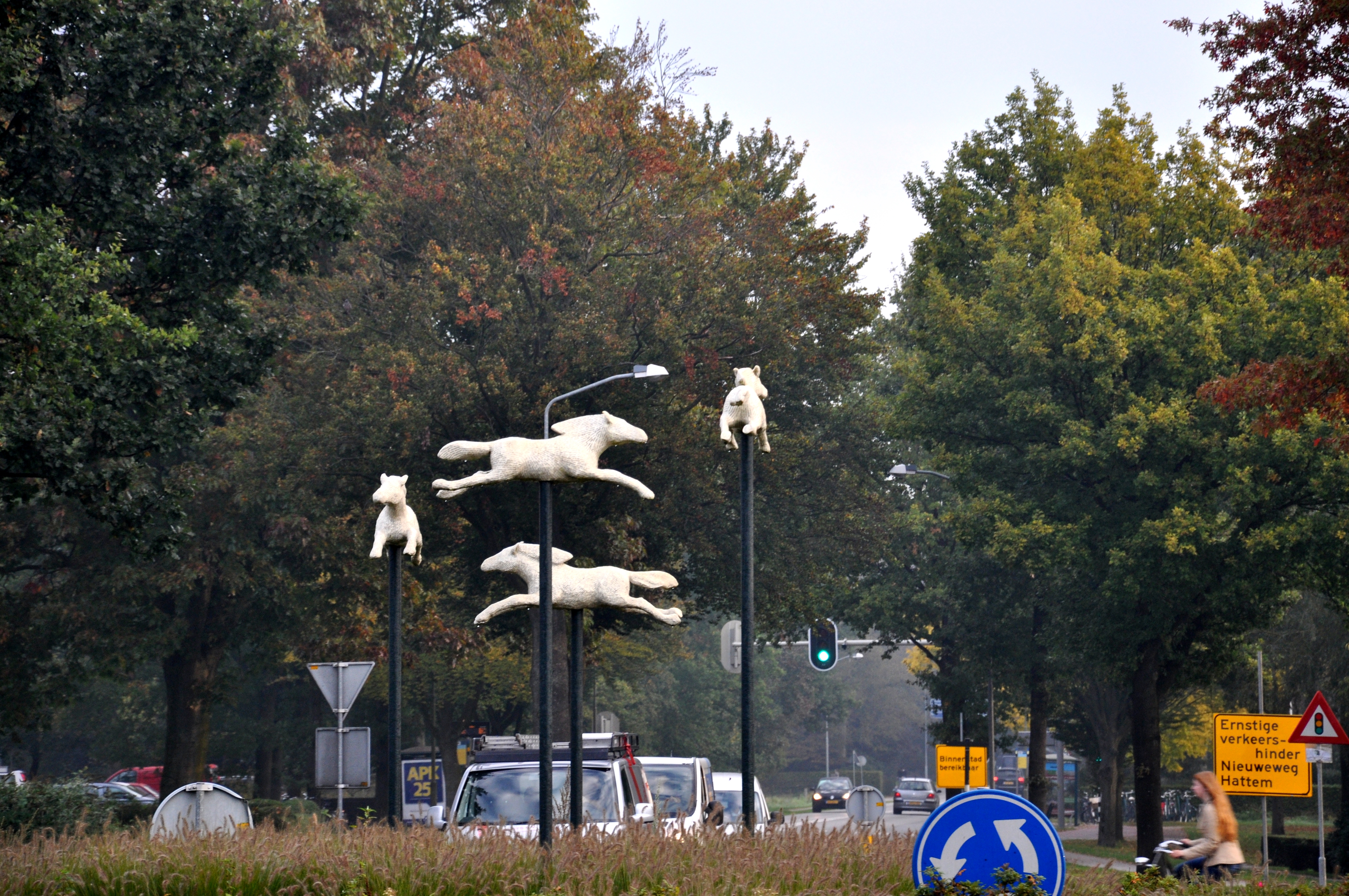
The Carousel sculpture in Heerde, Netherlands.

In 2009, Abels's sculpture Carousel was unveiled at the roundabout of the A50 junction in Heerde. The four horses symbolize the four villages that make up the municipality of Heerde; the horses are named after students in the high school and the residents of a nursing home.
