= Mariken (2000 film) =

2000 film

- Theatrical release poster
- Directed by: André van Duren
- Written by: Kim van Kooten
- Based on: Mariken by Peter van Gestel
- Produced by: Hans de Weers
- Starring: Laurien Van den Broeck; Jan Decleir; Willeke van Ammelrooy; Kim van Kooten; Ramsey Nasr
- Cinematography: Steve Walker
- Edited by: René Wiegmans
- Music by: Mark van Platen
- Production company: Egmond Film & Television
- Distributed by: C-Films
- Release date: 7 December 2000 (Netherlands)
- Running time: 92 minutes
- Country: Netherlands
- Language: Dutch
- Budget: ƒ4.1 million
- Box office: €352,146

Mariken is a 2000 Dutch medieval family film directed by André van Duren, from a screenplay written by Kim van Kooten based on the children's book Mariken by Peter van Gestel, an adaptation of the early sixteenth-century text Mariken van Nieumeghen. It stars Laurien Van den Broeck as the titular character alongside Jan Decleir, Willeke van Ammelrooy, Kim van Kooten and Ramsey Nasr.

At the Cinekid Festival, Mariken was the opening film and won the audience award for best youth film. It also won the audience award at the 2001's Netherlands Film Festival, and was nominated for Best Feature Film.

== Plot ==
The story is set in the Middle Ages. Mariken is an orphan who was raised by an old man and his goat in a forest. When the goat dies Mariken decides to go to town and buy a new one. On her way she comes across many people who are either sympathetic to her or want to do her harm...

== Cast ==
- Laurien Van den Broeck as Mariken
- Jan Decleir as Archibald
- Willeke van Ammelrooy - Griet
- Kim van Kooten as Isabella
- Ramsey Nasr as Joachim
- Johanna ter Steege as Countess
- Kees Boot as Dirk
- Dora van der Groen as Zwarte Weeuw
- Willem Van den Broeck as Rattenjan
- Geert Lageveen as Broeder Willem
