= André van Duren =

Dutch film director (born 1958)

- Born: 20 June 1958 (age 66); Reek, Netherlands

André van Duren (born 20 June 1958) is a Dutch film director. He has directed several films which won the Golden Film award for success at the box office.

== Career ==
His 1992 film Heading for England won the Dutch Film Critics Award at the Netherlands Film Festival.

In 2000, he directed the film Mariken which is based on Peter van Gestel's children's book Mariken which itself is based on the early sixteenth-century text Mariken van Nieumeghen. The film won the Audience Award at the Cinekid Festival that year. Mariken also won the Adult's Jury Award at the 2001 Chicago International Children's Film Festival. Lastly, the film also won the Audience Award as the 2001 Netherlands Film Festival.

In 2011, he directed the film The Gang of Oss which received the Golden Film award that year.

In 2016, the film The Fury won several Golden Calf awards: Hannah Hoekstra won the Golden Calf for Best Actress award for her role in the film and Anneke Blok won the Golden Calf for Best Supporting Actress award. The film is based on the book of the same name by A. F. Th. van der Heijden.

He also directed the 2022 thriller film Faithfully Yours. The film won the Golden Film award after having sold 100,000 tickets.

Van Duren also directed episodes of the television series Van God los, Dokter Tinus, Flight HS13, Moordvrouw, Nieuwe buren and De 12 van Schouwendam.

== Selected filmography ==
- 1991: Een dubbeltje te weinig
- 1992: Heading for England
- 2000: Mariken
- 2000: Young Kees
- 2011: The Gang of Oss
- 2016: The Fury
- 2022: Faithfully Yours
