= Marijke Hanegraaf =

Dutch poet

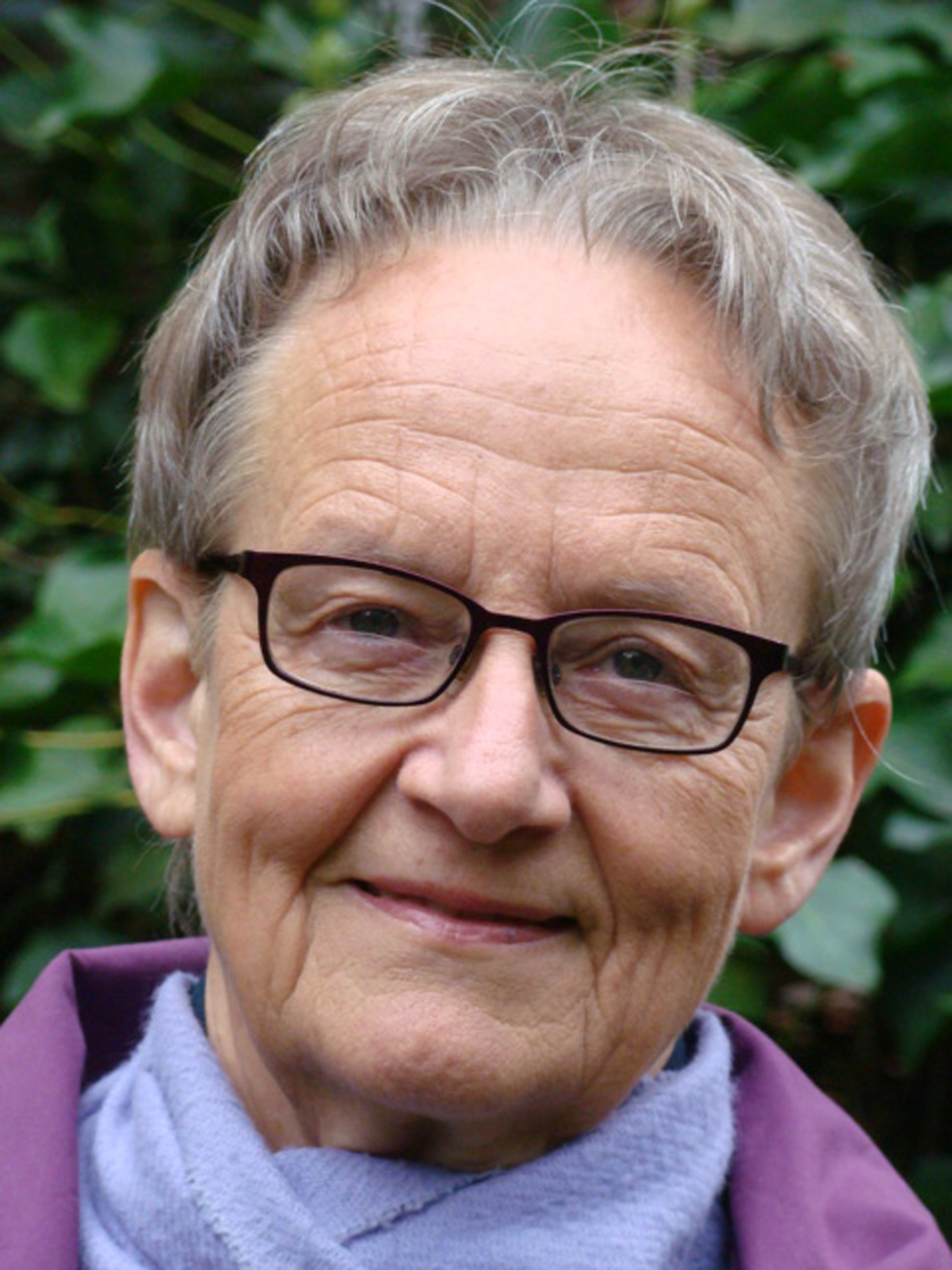
- Born: 6 March 1946 (age 80); Tilburg, the Netherlands
- Writing career
- Genre: Poetry
- Notable awards: Nijmeegse Literatuurprijs 1997
- Website: marijkehanegraaf.nl

Marijke Hanegraaf (born 1946) is a Dutch poet. Since 1997, she has lived in Nijmegen; she was the city's official poet in 2013 and 2014.

== Biography ==
Hanegraaf was born in Tilburg, The Netherlands. She began her career as a laboratory technician for a large Dutch pharmaceutical company, Organon, and after that she worked at the predecessor of the Dutch government organization for food and plant safety.

Her career took a turn into writing when she started working for children's magazine Taptoe. She wrote stories, informative articles and reports for the magazine. She also wrote information booklets for primary and secondary school children on various subjects. For many years, Hanegraaf worked as a freelance copy-editor.

She studied at a writers' vocational school, where she became fascinated by poetry. She writes about the desire to remain within a multitude of impressions. Eye and ear observations are essential to her poetry. It is poetry about life, with the intention of understanding another person and the surroundings better.

In August 1996 Hanegraaf made her debut in literary magazine Bloknoot. Excerpts of her work have appeared in the literary magazines Hollands Maandblad, Maatstaf, De Tweede Ronde, Ballustrada, and Het Liegend Konijn, as well as on several websites such a Cubra, KB, and DBNL (Digital Library for Dutch Literature).

In 2001 her debut poetry collection, Veerstraat, was published. Subsequently Proefsteen, Restruimte, Ergens slapen de anderen and Bestaansbegeerte were also published by Arbeiderspers, a Dutch national publishing house that is now part of Singel Uitgeverijen.

In 2013 and 2014 Hanegraaf was the official poet of the city of Nijmegen, her home town. The poems she wrote in this period are printed on a banner called Stadsgedichten. Three poems, Stadswaard, Station Nijmegen Lent, and Oversteken (Crossing over) have been recognised by the city of Nijmegen as literary beacons.

Hanegraaf is involved as a volunteer at the Poeziecentrum Nederland, a study and collection centre for modern Dutch poetry. She is active as a tour guide for the poetry walks in the city of Nijmegen. They also hold a collection of her work.

Her poems Waalkade and Albany-Nijmegen are set to music. Oversteken (Crossing Over) and Albany-Nijmegen are translated into English. Several poems have been translated into French, German, and Indonesian.

In November 2024, Marijke Hanegraaf exhibited her series Van ons vandaan together with photographs by Ineke Janssen at the Marienburg Library in Nijmegen. The works are poems about her mother's euthanasia. A poetry collection was also published in conjunction with the exhibition.

=== Awards and honours ===
In 1997 she won both the jury and the Audience Award at the Nijmeegse Literatuurprijs. For her debut poetry collection she was nominated in 2002 for the C. Buddingh’ prijs, an annual award for writers who have not yet published with a national publishing house.

== Poetry collections ==
- Van ons vandaan (2024), Uitgeverij Roelants, photos Ineke Janssen
- Bestaansbegeerte (2022), De Arbeiderspers
- Ergens slapen de anderen (2016), De Arbeiderspers
- Stadsgedichten (2015)
- Restruimte (2010) De Arbeiderspers
- Proefsteen (2006), De Arbeiderspers, e-book versie
- Veerstraat (2001), De Arbeiderspers, nominated for the C. Buddingh' prijs.

The poems she wrote as the official poet of Nijmegen were published in 2015 by the Stichting Literaire Activiteiten (Nijmegen), in conjunction with Poeziecentrum Nederland.
