= Marieke Veenhoven-Mattheussens =

Dutch field hockey player

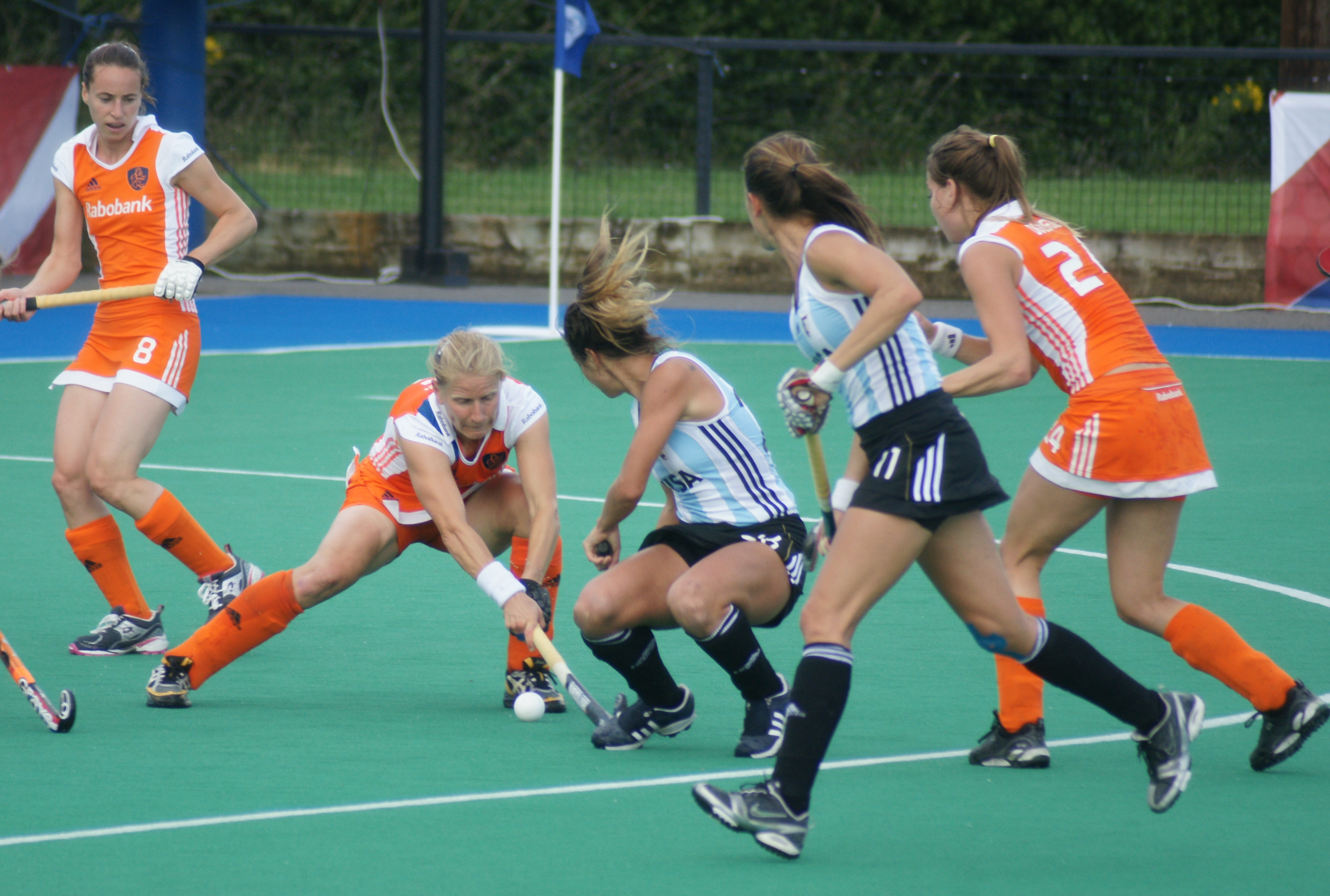
- Marieke Veenhoven-Mattheussens (left, 2010)

Personal information
- Born: 8 March 1984 (age 42) Leiden
- Height: 1.64 m (5 ft 5 in)

Sport
- Sport: Field hockey
- Club: Amsterdam
Medal record
Representing the Netherlands
Hockey World Cup
Silver medal – second place	2010 Rosario	Team
Hockey Champions Trophy
Bronze medal – third place	2009 Sydney	Team
Silver medal – second place	2010 Nottingham	Team
Gold medal – first place	2011 Amstelveen	Team
EuroHockey Nations Championship
Gold medal – first place	2009 Amsterdam	Team

Marieke Veenhoven-Mattheussens (born 8 March 1984) is a field hockey player from the Netherlands. She was part of the Dutch teams that won the silver medal at the 2010 World Cup and three medals, including a gold, at the Hockey Champions Trophy in 2009–2011.

Her mother, Maria Mattheussens-Fikkers, also competed internationally in field hockey.
