= List of Spanish association football families =

This is a list of Spanish association football (soccer) families.

Families included on the list must have

1. at least, one member of the family is capped by a national team on the senior level or an important person in the game of football (e.g., notable coaches, referees, club chairmen, etc.)
2. a second member must be a professional player or capped by a national team on the U-17 level or above.

== List ==
=== A ===
- José Luis Ablanedo, Juan Carlos Ablanedo (brother)
- (Brazil) Adalberto, Rodrigo (son)
- José Antonio Agirre, Juan Mari Agirre, Tomas Agirre, Teodoro Agirre, Iñaki Agirre, Ángel Agirre (brothers)
- Marcelino Agirrezabala (Chirri), Chirri II (brother)
- Xavi Aguado, Marc Aguado (son)
- Miguel Albiol, Raúl Albiol (brother)
- Rafael Alkorta Sr. (Alcorta), Rafael Alkorta Jr., Óscar Alkorta (sons)
- Marcos Alonso Imaz (Marquitos), Marcos (son), Marcos Alonso (grandson), Luis Zabala (Marcos Alonso's great-grandfather)
- Periko Alonso, Mikel Alonso, Xabi Alonso (sons)
- Santos Alonso (Santos), Emilín (brother)
- Antonio Alsúa, Rafael Alsúa (brother)
- Antonio Álvarez, Juan Álvarez (brother)
- Manuel Aparicio, Alfonso Aparicio (brother)
- José Agustín Aranzábal (Gaztelu), Agustín Aranzábal (son)
- Luis Arconada, Gonzalo Arconada (brother)
- Serafín Areta, Esteban Areta, José Luis Areta, Jesús María Areta (brothers)
- Eneko Arieta, Antón Arieta (brother)
- Ángel Arocha, Arsenio Arocha (brother)
- Peio Artola, Pedro Artola (brother)
- Gilberto Asensio, Igor Asensio, Marco Asensio (sons)
- Adolfo Atienza, Ángel Atienza (brother)
- Miguel Ayestarán, Antonio Ayestarán (brother)
- Juan Pablo Azpilicueta, César Azpilicueta (brother)

=== B ===
- Manuel Badenes, Virgilio Badenes (brother)
- (Serbia) Srđan Bajčetić, Stefan Bajcetic (son)
- José Mari Bakero, Santiago Bakero, Jon Bakero (brothers), Itziar Bakero (sister), Jon Bakero (son)
- Rubén Baraja, Javier Baraja (brother)
- Marc Bartra, Èric Bartra (twin brother)
- Estanislau Basora, Joaquín Basora (brother)
- Amador Bernabéu, Gerard Piqué (grandson)
- Antonio Bernabéu, Marcelo Bernabéu, Santiago Bernabéu (brothers)
- Custodio Bienzobas, Paco Bienzobas, Cuqui Bienzobas (brothers)
- Carles Busquets, Sergio Busquets (son)

=== C ===
- José Callejón, Juanmi Callejón (twin brother)
- Juan José Camacho, Luis Camacho (brother), Juanjo Camacho, Ignacio Camacho (sons)
- Sergio Canales, Borja Docal (cousin)
- Santiago Cañizares, Lucas Cañizares (son)
- Fran Carmona, Olga Carmona (sister)
- Paco Castellano, Fernando Castellano (brother)
- Enrique Castro (Quini), Jesús Castro (brother)
- José Claramunt, Enrique Claramunt (brother)
- Gerardo Clares, Manolo Clares (brother)
- Jesús Clavería, Pablo Clavería (son)
- Antonio Collar, Enrique Collar (brother)
- Quique Costas, Quique Álvarez, Óscar Álvarez (sons)

=== D ===
- Raúl de Tomás (Beni), Raúl de Tomás, Rubén de Tomás (sons)
- (Italy) Alfredo Di Stefano Sr., (Argentina) (Colombia) (Spain) Alfredo Di Stéfano (son)
- (Guinea-Bissau) Álvaro Djaló, Malcom Adu Ares (cousin)

=== E ===
- (Equatorial Guinea) Vicente Engonga Nguema, Vicente Engonga, Julio Engonga, Rafa Engonga, Óscar Engonga (sons), (Equatorial Guinea) Igor (grandson/son of Óscar), Joshua Engonga (grandson/son of Julio)

=== F ===
- (Guinea-Bissau) Bori Fati, (Guinea-Bissau) Braima Fati, Ansu Fati (sons)
- Ignacio Fernández (Nacho), Álex Fernández (brother)
- Guille Fernández, Toni Fernández (double cousin)
- (Brazil) Roberto Firmino, Selton Sánchez (cousin)

=== G ===
- Miguel Gainza, Agustín Gainza (brother)
- Juan Galán Bayarri, Enrique Galán (brother)
- José García (Moñino), Javi García (son)
- Óscar, Roger, Genís (brothers)
- Ángel Garitano (Ondarru), Ander Garitano (brother), Gaizka Garitano (son), Asier Garitano (distant relative)
- Paco Gento, Julio Gento, Antonio Gento (brothers), Paco Llorente, Julio Llorente (nephews), Ramón Grosso (father-in-law of Paco Llorente), Marcos Llorente (son of Paco Llorente)
- José Glaría, Francisco Glaría, Jaime Glaría, Jesús Glaría (brothers)
- Joan Golobart, Román Golobart (son)
- José Ramón González (José Ramón), Fran (brother), Nico González (nephew/son of Fran)
- Miguel González, Míchel (son), Adrián (grandson)
- Raúl González (Raúl), Jorge González (son), María González (daughter)
- Juli Gonzalvo, Josep Gonzalvo, Marià Gonzalvo (brothers)
- Adrien Goñi, Iker Muniain (cousin)
- Julen Guerrero, José Félix Guerrero (brother), Julen Jon Guerrero (son)
- José Guillamón, Fernando Guillamón (brother)
- Dani Güiza, Nuria Bermúdez (former agent and partner/mother of his son, Daniel)
- José María Gutiérrez (Guti), Javi Hernández (cousin)

=== H ===
- Iván Helguera, Luis Helguera (brother)
- Pedro Herrera, Ander Herrera (son)
- (England) Emile Heskey, Mateo Joseph (second nephew)
- Antonio Hierro, Manolo Hierro, Fernando Hierro (brothers)
- (Netherlands) Donny Huijsen, Dean Huijsen (son)

=== I ===
- Silvestre Igoa, Antonio Igoa (brother)
- Ander Iturraspe, Gorka Iturraspe (brother)

=== J ===
- Gabriel Jorge, Valentín Jorge, Manuel Jorge (brothers)
- Joselu, Dani Carvajal (wife's brother-in-law)
- Cristóbal Juncal, Urbe Aspas, Jonathan Aspas, Iago Aspas (nephews), Adrián Cruz (nephew), Raúl Blanco (nephew), Aitor Aspas (Aspas brothers' cousin)

=== K ===
- Aitor Karanka, David Karanka (brother)
- (Socialist Federal Republic of Yugoslavia) Bojan Krkić, Bojan (son), (Argentina) Lionel Messi (fourth cousin of Bojan Jr.), (Argentina) Maxi Biancucchi, (Argentina) Emanuel Biancucchi (cousins of Lionel), (Argentina) Lucas Scaglia (cousin-in-law of Lionel)

=== L ===
- Amadeo Labarta (Amadeo), Pepito (brother)
- Ricardo Lapetra, Carlos Lapetra (brother), Christian Lapetra (nephew/son of Carlos)
- Joan Laporta, Pol Laporta (son)
- Aymeric Laporte, (France) Leo Laporte (brother)
- Txomin Larrainzar, Iñigo Larrainzar (brother)
- Robin Le Normand, (France) Théo Le Normand (brother)
- Francisco Lesmes, Rafael Lesmes (brother)
- Julen Lopetegui, Juan José Maqueda (brother-in-law)
- Sergi López, Julià López i Segú, Gerard (brothers)
- Luis López Rekarte, Aitor López Rekarte (brother), Maitane López (niece)

=== M ===
- (Brazil) Marcelo, Enzo Alves (son)
- Martín Marculeta, José María Marculeta (brother)
- Álvaro Martínez, Javi Martínez (brother)
- José Martínez (Pirri), Daniel Martínez (son)
- Juan Mata Sr., Juan Mata (son)
- Cristian Mayoral (Kity), Borja Mayoral (brother)
- (Brazil) Mazinho, Thiago, (Brazil) Rafinha (sons)
- Modesto Méndez (Pupi), Brais Méndez (son)
- Andrés Mendieta, Gaizka Mendieta (son)
- Julián Merino, Ángel Merino (brother), Mikel Merino (nephew/son of Miguel)
- Míchel, Álex Sánchez (son)
- Juan José Mieza, Bernabé Mieza (brother)
- Óscar Mingueza, Ariadna Mingueza (sister)

=== N ===
- Joaquín Navarro Perona, Alfonso Navarro Perona (brother)
- Marco Navas, Jesús Navas (brother)

=== Ñ ===
- José Antonio Ñíguez (Boria), Jony, Aarón Ñíguez, Saúl Ñíguez (sons)

=== O ===
- Luis Olaso, Alfonso Olaso (brother)
- Miquel Olmo, Carlos Olmo, Dani Olmo (sons)
- Jesús Orejuela, Diego Orejuela (brother), Antonio Orejuela (cousin)

=== P ===
- José Ramón Palacio, (Argentina) Rodrigo Palacio (son)
- César Palacios Chocarro, César Palacios Pérez (son)
- Luis Ernesto Paños (Luis), Javier Paños (son), Sandra Paños (daughter)
- Alfonso Pérez (Alfonso), Iván Pérez (brother)
- Hernán Pérez, Michu (brother)
- (Argentina) Mauricio Pochettino, Maurizio Pochettino (son)
- María José Pérez, Ayoze Pérez (cousin)
- Francisco Puado, Javi Puado (son)
- (Hungary) Ferenc Puskás Sr., (Hungary) (Spain) Ferenc Puskás (son)

=== Q ===
- Jacinto Quincoces, Juan Quincoces Sr. (brother), Juan Quincoces Jr. (nephew/son of Juan Sr.), Juan Carlos Quincoces (nephew)

=== R ===
- René Ramos, Sergio Ramos (brother), José Mari (second cousin)
- Luis Regueiro Sr. (Corso), Pedro Regueiro (brother), (Mexico) Luis Regueiro Jr. (son)
- Miguel Reina, Pepe Reina (son)
- José Antonio Reyes, José Reyes López (son)
- Llorenç Rifé, Joaquim Rifé (brother)
- Eusebio Ríos, Roberto Ríos (son)
- Ricardo Rodríguez Álvarez, Severino Rodríguez, César Rodríguez (brothers), Peli (son)
- Txetxu Rojo, José Ángel Rojo (brother)
- Ana Romero, (Netherlands) Merel van Dongen (wife)
- Francisco Rufete, Fran Pérez (son)

=== S ===
- Víctor Salas, Kike Salas (nephew)
- Julio Salinas, Patxi Salinas (brother)
- Aurelio Sánchez, Lucas, Ricardo Sánchez, Joaquín (sons)
- Manuel Sanchís, Manolo Sanchís (son)
- Fede San Emeterio, Borja San Emeterio (twin brother)
- Miguel San Román Núñez, Miguel San Román Ferrándiz (grandnephew)
- Lorenzo Sanz, Paco Sanz, Fernando Sanz (sons), Paco Sanz Mora (grandson), Míchel Salgado (son-in-law)
- Manuel Sarabia, Eder Sarabia (son)
- Imanol Sarriegi, Oier Sarriegi (brother), Amaiur Sarriegi (sister)
- Jesús María Satrústegui, Ignacio Satrústegui (brother)
- Agustín Sauto (Bata), José Sauto (brother)
- Marcos Senna, (Brazil) Márcio Senna (brother), (Brazil) Marcos Assunção (cousin)
- Félix Sesúmaga, Críspulo Sesúmaga (brother)
- Quique Setién, Laro Setién (son)
- José Suárez, Luis Suárez (brother)
- Roberto Solozábal, Hugo Solozábal (son)
- Néstor Susaeta, Markel Susaeta (cousin)

=== T ===
- Marc Torrejón, Marta Torrejón (sister)
- Fernando Tirapu, Mariano Tirapu (brother), Ainhoa Tirapu (cousin-nephew)
- (Mali) Mohamed Traoré (Moha), Adama Traoré (brother)

=== U ===
- Fidel Uriarte, Gabriel Uriarte (brother)

=== V ===
- Luis Valle Benítez, Joaquín Valle (brother)
- Martí Ventolrà, (Mexico) José Vantolrá (son)
- José Luis Violeta, José María Violeta (brother)

=== W ===
- (Ghana) Iñaki Williams, Nico Williams (brother)

=== Z ===
- Ricardo Zamora, Ricardo Zamora de Grassa (son)
- Tomás Zarraonandia, Domingo Zarraonandia, Telmo Zarra (brothers)
- Santi Zubieta, Ángel Zubieta (brother)

== See also ==
- List of professional sports families
- List of family relations in American football
  - List of second-generation National Football League players
- List of association football (soccer) families
  - List of African association football families
  - List of European association football families
    - List of English association football families
    - List of former Yugoslavia association football families
    - List of Scottish football families
  - Category:Association football families
- List of Australian rules football families
- List of second-generation Major League Baseball players
- List of second-generation National Basketball Association players
- List of boxing families
- List of chess families
- List of International cricket families
- List of family relations in the National Hockey League
- List of family relations in rugby league
- List of international rugby union families
- List of professional wrestling families
