= Bakero =

Bakero is a Spanish surname. Notable people with the surname include:

- Itziar Bakero (born 1969), Spanish former footballer
- Jon Bakero (born 1996), Spanish footballer
- Jon Bakero (born 1971), Spanish retired footballer
- José Mari Bakero (born 1963), Spanish retired footballer
- Santiago Bakero (born 1958), Spanish retired footballer
