= Setién =

Setién is a surname. Notable people with the surname include:

- José María Setién (1928–2018), Spanish Catholic prelate
- Laro Setién (born 1995), Spanish football midfielder
- Miguel Delibes Setién (1920–2010), Spanish writer
- Quique Setién (born 1958), Spanish football manager and former football central midfielder
