= Gento =

Gento may refer to:

- Gento (son of Genseric) (died 477), the fourth and youngest son of Genseric, the founder of the Vandal kingdom in Africa
- Gento (Goth), 5th century Gothic soldier in Eastern Roman service
- Francisco Gento (1933–2022), also known as Gento I, a Spanish footballer
- Julio Gento (1939–2016), also known as Gento II, a Spanish footballer
- Antonio Gento (1940–2020), also known as Gento III, a Spanish footballer
- Francisco Llorente Gento (born 1965), Spanish footballer
- Gentō, Japanese name for magic lanterns
- "Gento" (song), by SB19

== See also ==
- Gentoo Linux, a computer operating system based on the Linux kernel
