= Lorenzo Sanz Jr. =

Spanish basketball player and manager

Personal information
- Born: 16 June 1971 (age 54) Madrid, Spain
- Listed height: 1.98 m (6 ft 6 in)

Career information
- College: Lafayette (1991–1993)
- Playing career: 1993–1998
- Position: Small forward

Career history
- 1993–1994: Las Rozas
- 1994–1996: Real Canoe
- 1996–1998: Real Madrid

Lorenzo Sanz Durán (born 16 June 1971) is a former Spanish basketball player and manager. He is a commentator on Real Madrid games on Real Madrid TV, along with Siro López and Vicente Paniagua as well as presenter of the Las Carreras program, which is broadcast on www.lascarreras.com and on Teledeporte, where it is held at Madrid's Hipódromo de la Zarzuela and which follows the Spanish horse racing circuit live.

== Professional career ==
Sanz played two seasons for the Lafayette Leopards. Later he would have a modest career as a player, retiring in 1999 from basketball. After leaving the sport, he would take over the reins as director general of Real Madrid, his time in the offices being as brief as successful, since he won the Liga ACB title in the only year he was in command of the merengue team. In a tight final against FC Barcelona, Real Madrid broke all odds and won the league in the fifth game at the Palau Blaugrana. Shortly after, his father, who at that time presided over Real Madrid, would lose the elections against Florentino Pérez, and Sanz himself would cease to hold his position as technical director, although the new president offered him to continue in office.

== Post-playing career ==
In 2006 Lorenzo Sanz Sr. granted a loan through Nuada and Renfisa (sued by Grupo Barada for outstanding multi-million euro debts) to Fomento del Deporte e Imagen, S.L., managed by Lorenzo Sanz Durán, to acquire 96% of Málaga CF for 6 million euros plus debt (24 million), becoming president. Fomento del Deporte e Imagen was owned by Ingrid Asensio (50%), her husband Fernando Sanz Duran (49.8%) and Pascual Gómez (0.2%), advisor to Lorenzo Sanz Sr. In 2010 Abdullah bin Nasser Al Thani acquired the club from the Sanz family for 36 million euros.

== Personal life ==
Sanz is the older brother of footballers Paco and Fernando Sanz, and the oldest son of Lorenzo Sanz, who was president of Real Madrid for five years. He is also the brother-in-law of Míchel Salgado.

== Awards and accomplishments ==
=== Professional career ===
- FIBA EuroCup Champion: (1997)
