= Junyent =

Junyent is a surname which may refer to:

- Carme Junyent (1955-2023), Catalan linguist
- Genís García Junyent (born 1975), Spanish former footballer
- Manuel de Amat y Junyent (1707-1782), Spanish military officer and colonial administrator
- Oriol Junyent (born 1976), Spanish basketball player
- Quim Junyent (born 2007), Spanish footballer
