= Míchel Salgado =

Spanish footballer (born 1975)

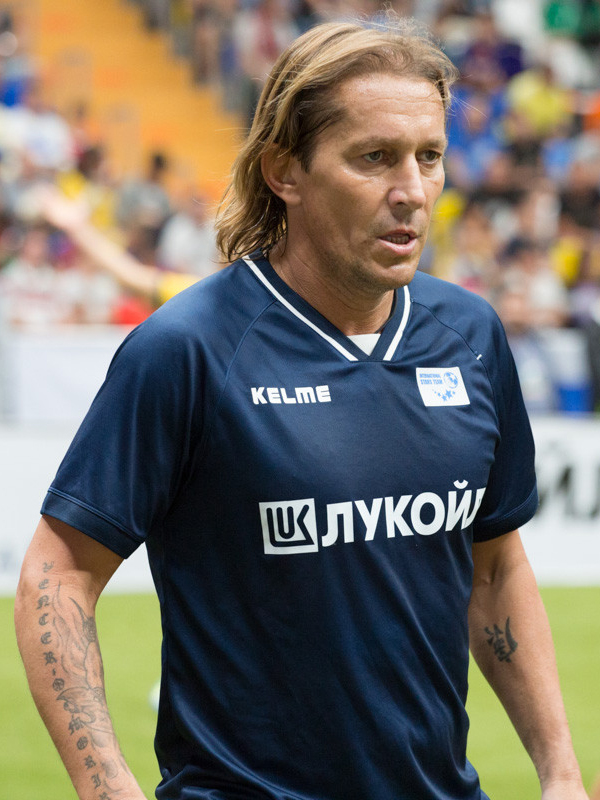
- Salgado playing in a legends match in 2018

Personal information
- Full name: Miguel Ángel Salgado Fernández
- Date of birth: 22 October 1975 (age 51)
- Place of birth: As Neves, Spain
- Height: 1.74 m (5 ft 9 in)
- Position: Right-back

Team information
- Current team: Saudi Arabia (under-15)

Youth career
- 1990–1992: Cristo Victoria
- 1992–1994: Celta

Senior career*
Years	Team	Apps	(Gls)
1994–1995	Celta B	20	(1)
1995–1999	Celta	92	(3)
1996–1997	→ Salamanca (loan)	36	(1)
1999–2009	Real Madrid	251	(4)
2009–2012	Blackburn Rovers	66	(0)
2018	Independiente	1	(0)
Total		466	(9)

International career
1994	Spain U18	7	(0)
1995	Spain U19	2	(0)
1995	Spain U20	5	(1)
1996–1998	Spain U21	10	(0)
1998–2006	Spain	53	(0)
2005	Galicia	1	(0)

Managerial career
- 2016–2017: Galicia
- 2022: Pafos (interim)
- 2023: Pafos (interim)
- 2024–: Saudi Arabia (under-15)
- * Club domestic league appearances and goals

Miguel Ángel "Míchel" Salgado Fernández (born 22 October 1975) is a Spanish former professional footballer who played as a right-back.

Nicknamed Il Due ("two" in Italian), he was known for his combative tackling and attacking play. After excellent displays at Celta, he spent an entire decade at Real Madrid, where former teammate Steve McManaman attested to his aggressive style by describing him as "the hardest person in the world....a genuine psychopath, even in training." He also played three seasons in England with Blackburn Rovers.

Salgado, who played 343 La Liga matches and scored seven goals, represented the Spain national team over eight years, collecting more than 50 caps and appearing in one World Cup and one European Championship.

== Club career ==
=== Celta ===
Born in As Neves, Province of Pontevedra, Galicia, Salgado began his professional career with hometown's RC Celta de Vigo, making his La Liga debut on 22 January 1995 in a 4–0 away loss against Real Madrid. He was loaned for a season to UD Salamanca in the Segunda División, and after his return became the first-choice in his position.

Whilst at Celta, Salgado was involved in an incident with Atlético Madrid's Juninho Paulista in February 1998: after a dangerous challenge, the Brazilian was sidelined for six months and missed that year's FIFA World Cup.

Salgado scored a career-best three goals in the 1998–99 campaign, helping his team to finish fifth and qualify for the UEFA Cup.

=== Real Madrid ===
In 1999, Salgado was purchased by Real Madrid for €11,000,000, playing 29 league games in his first season while also helping the club win the UEFA Champions League. He was the capital side's starter during his first seven years, but was relegated to the bench by former Sevilla FC youngster Sergio Ramos in 2006–07.

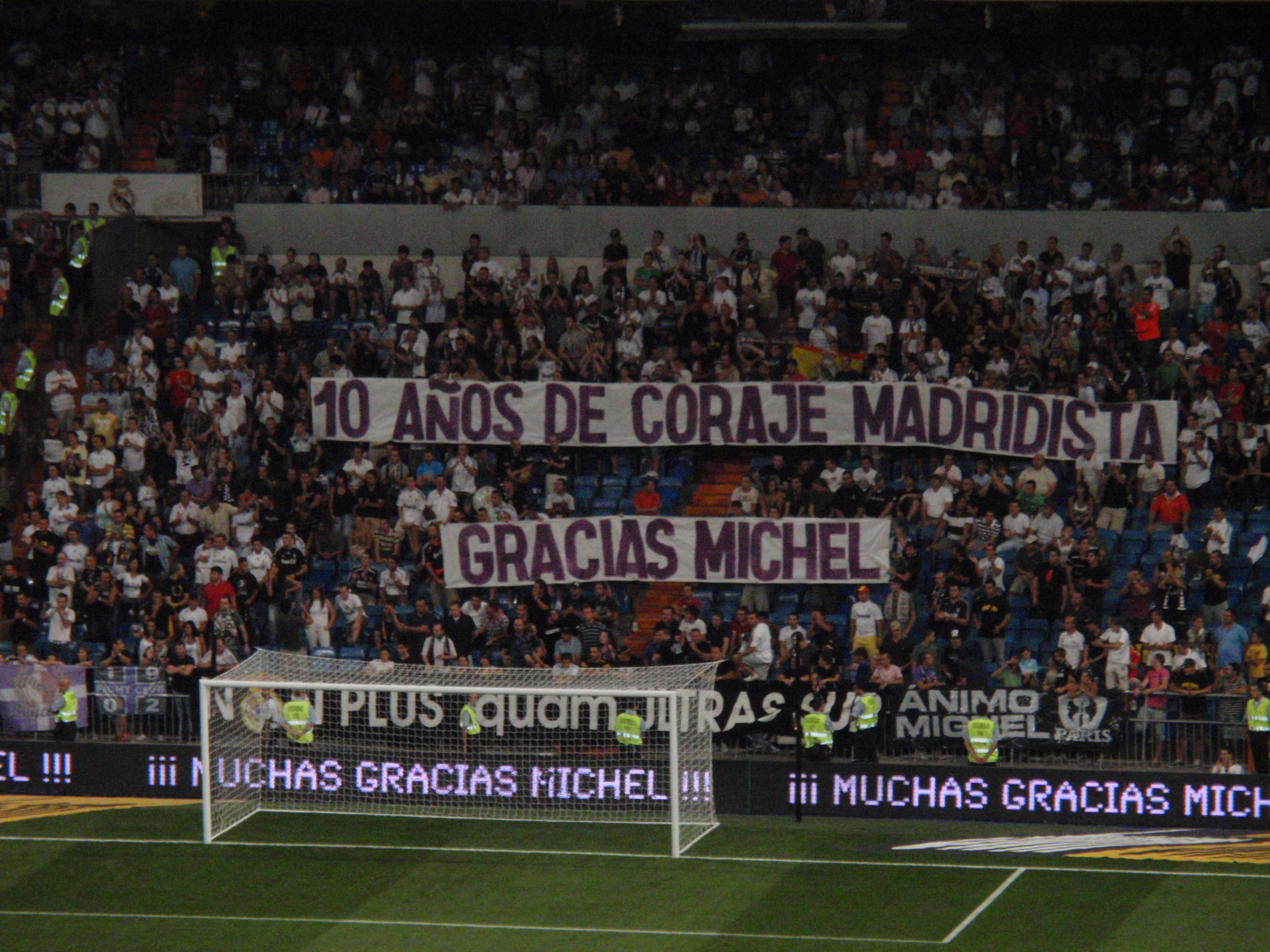
Real Madrid fans show their appreciation of Salgado's ten years service to the club

Salgado was only able to contribute 16 matches to the Merengues' 30th national title, mainly due to injuries. In the following two campaigns he featured very rarely (only 17 appearances), being sent off in the final game of 2008–09, a 2–1 loss at CA Osasuna on 31 May 2009 as Madrid slumped to a fifth consecutive league defeat.

Salgado was released in early August 2009, with the team already midway into pre-season.

=== Blackburn Rovers ===
Salgado moved to Blackburn Rovers of the Premier League on 19 August 2009, signing a two-year deal after impressing manager Sam Allardyce whilst on trial. He went on to say he was happy to be playing for his new club, intending to retire at Ewood Park.

Salgado made his competitive debut on 12 September 2009, against Wolverhampton Wanderers as a late substitute (3–1 home win). On 27 October he scored his only goal for his new team, in a 5–2 victory over Peterborough United in the Football League Cup.

On 27 January 2011, the 35-year-old Salgado agreed to a contract extension. He was first choice in the first games of the 2011–12 season, until picking up an injury.

Blackburn manager Steve Kean revealed in December 2011 that Salgado was being omitted from the squad as his contract stated that the player was entitled to a new deal if he played nine more matches in the campaign, the club not being able to afford fresh terms.

=== Futsal and later years ===
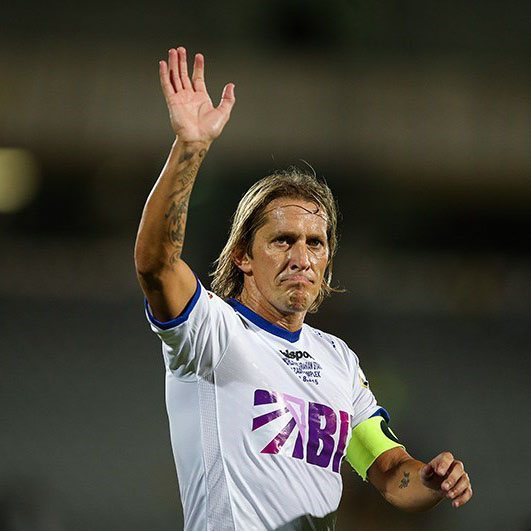
Salgado in a charity match in Tehran in 2015

Aged 40, Salgado came out of retirement to join Kochi 5s in India's Premier Futsal as a marquee player. He later was part of the board of Heritage Sports Holdings, which owned the football clubs Gibraltar United F.C. and UD Los Barrios.

Salgado came out of retirement again in April 2018, starting for C.A. Independiente de La Chorrera in a 1–1 draw against C.D. Plaza Amador in the quarter-finals of the Panamanian Clausura tournament. He settled in Dubai, United Arab Emirates after retiring, and in 2020 helped to found Fursan Hispania FC, initially as an academy.

On 5 February 2021, Salgado was appointed director of football of Cypriot First Division side Pafos FC. On two occasions, he acted as their caretaker manager.

== International career ==
Salgado won the first of his 53 caps for Spain on 5 September 1998, in an infamous 3–2 loss in Cyprus for the UEFA Euro 2000 qualifiers. He was part of the nation's squads at Euro 2000 and the 2006 FIFA World Cup.

Due to last-minute injuries, Salgado missed out on the 2002 World Cup and Euro 2004. He also represented the Galician autonomous side, which he later coached alongside Deportivo de La Coruña's Fran.

On 4 September 2018, Salgado was named assistant manager to the Egyptian national team. In June 2024, following rumours that he would be taking over TFF First League club Sakaryaspor, he became head coach of the Saudi Arabia under-15 national team.

== Personal life ==
Salgado married Malula Sanz, daughter of former Real Madrid president Lorenzo Sanz, on 5 July 2000. They have three children, daughter Malu (born 2003) and sons Miguel (2005) and Alán (2009). Malu is a singer, while her brothers are also footballers.

Salgado is brother-in-law of former Real Madrid players Fernando Sanz and Paco Sanz, as well as of basketball player Lorenzo Sanz Jr. He is an avid chess fan.

== Career statistics ==
=== Club ===
Appearances and goals by club, season and competition
Club	Season	League			National Cup		League Cup		Continental		Total	
Club	Season	Division	Apps	Goals	Apps	Goals	Apps	Goals	Apps	Goals	Apps	Goals
Celta B	1993–94	Segunda División B	20	1	0	0	—		0	0	20	1
Celta	1994−95	La Liga	14	0	1	0	—		0	0	15	0
Celta	1995−96	La Liga	18	0	5	0	—		0	0	23	0
Celta	1997−98	La Liga	25	0	5	0	—		0	0	30	0
Celta	1998−99	La Liga	35	3	2	0	—		7	0	44	3
Celta	Total		92	3	13	0	—		7	0	112	3
Salamanca (loan)	1996–97	Segunda División	36	1	2	0	—		0	0	38	1
Real Madrid	1999−2000	La Liga	29	0	0	0	—		17	0	46	0
Real Madrid	2000−01	La Liga	27	1	0	0	—		11	0	38	1
Real Madrid	2001−02	La Liga	35	0	1	0	—		14	0	50	0
Real Madrid	2002−03	La Liga	35	0	0	0	—		16	1	51	1
Real Madrid	2003−04	La Liga	35	1	1	0	—		10	0	46	1
Real Madrid	2004−05	La Liga	30	2	0	0	—		9	0	39	2
Real Madrid	2005−06	La Liga	27	0	1	0	—		5	0	33	0
Real Madrid	2006−07	La Liga	16	0	0	0	—		1	0	17	0
Real Madrid	2007−08	La Liga	8	0	3	0	—		2	0	13	0
Real Madrid	2008−09	La Liga	9	0	0	0	—		1	0	10	0
Real Madrid	Total		251	4	6	0	—		86	1	343	5
Blackburn Rovers	2009–10	Premier League	21	0	1	0	4	1	—		26	1
Blackburn Rovers	2010–11	Premier League	36	0	2	0	0	0	—		38	0
Blackburn Rovers	2011–12	Premier League	9	0	0	0	0	0	—		9	0
Blackburn Rovers	Total		66	0	3	0	4	1	—		73	1
Independiente	2017–18	Liga LPF	1	0	0	0	—		0	0	1	0
Career total			466	9	24	0	4	1	93	1	587	11

=== International ===
Appearances and goals by national team and year
National team	Year	Apps	Goals
Spain	1998	3	0
Spain	1999	9	0
Spain	2000	5	0
Spain	2001	0	0
Spain	2002	5	0
Spain	2003	10	0
Spain	2004	8	0
Spain	2005	8	0
Spain	2006	5	0
Total		53	0

== Honours ==
Real Madrid

- La Liga: 2000–01, 2002–03, 2006–07, 2007–08
- Supercopa de España: 2001, 2003, 2008
- UEFA Champions League: 1999–2000, 2001–02
- Intercontinental Cup: 2002
- UEFA Super Cup: 2002

Independiente

- Liga LPF: Clausura 2018

Spain U21

- UEFA European Under-21 Championship: 1998
