= Óscar Engonga =

Spanish football player and manager (born 1968)

Personal information
- Full name: Óscar Engonga Maté
- Date of birth: 12 September 1968 (age 58)
- Place of birth: Torrelavega, Spain
- Height: 1.78 m (5 ft 10 in)
- Position: Midfielder

Youth career
- 1986–1987: Gimnástica

Senior career*
Years	Team	Apps	(Gls)
1987	Barcelona C	1	(0)
1987–1988	Mirandés	7	(1)
1988–1989	Gimnástica	4	(0)
1989–1990	Langreo	12	(2)
1990–1991	Sporting Mahonés	32	(3)
1991	Valladolid	1	(0)
1992	Tudelano		
1992–1993	Toledo	30	(2)
1993–1994	Racing Santander	2	(0)
1994	Figueres	7	(1)
1994–1995	Mensajero	27	(2)
1995–1996	Racing Ferrol	29	(3)
1996–1998	Gimnástica	56	(12)
1998	Burgos	15	(0)
1999	Castellón	2	(0)
Total		225	(26)

Managerial career
- 2003: Equatorial Guinea
- 2012: Nsok Nsomo
- * Club domestic league appearances and goals

Óscar Engonga Maté (born 12 September 1968) is a Spanish former football player and manager who played as a midfielder.

== Football career ==
Engonga was born in Torrelavega, Cantabria. During his career, spent mainly in Spain's lower leagues, he appeared in three La Liga matches, one for Real Valladolid and two for Racing de Santander. He retired in 1999, aged only 30.

Shortly after, Engonga took up coaching, managing for a brief period Equatorial Guinea, which featured former fellow professionals in Spain Rodolfo Bodipo and Benjamín Zarandona. Subsequently, he served as technical assistant to his brother Vicente when the latter was in charge of the national team.

== Personal life ==
Engonga came from a football family. His father Vicente was also a footballer who left Equatorial Guinea in 1958 and settled in Torrelavega, playing for Gimnástica de Torrelavega and other teams in the region. Óscar was the youngest of four brothers (all former players), the most prominent being older Vicente, who represented Spain at UEFA Euro 2000; Óscar and Vicente coincided at Gimnástica – with siblings Julio and Rafael – and Valladolid in the 1991–92 season.

Engonga's son, Igor, who was born in Santa Cruz de La Palma while he played in that city for CD Mensajero, represented Equatorial Guinea at both under-16 and senior level.
