= Óscar García (footballer, born 1973) =

Spanish footballer and manager

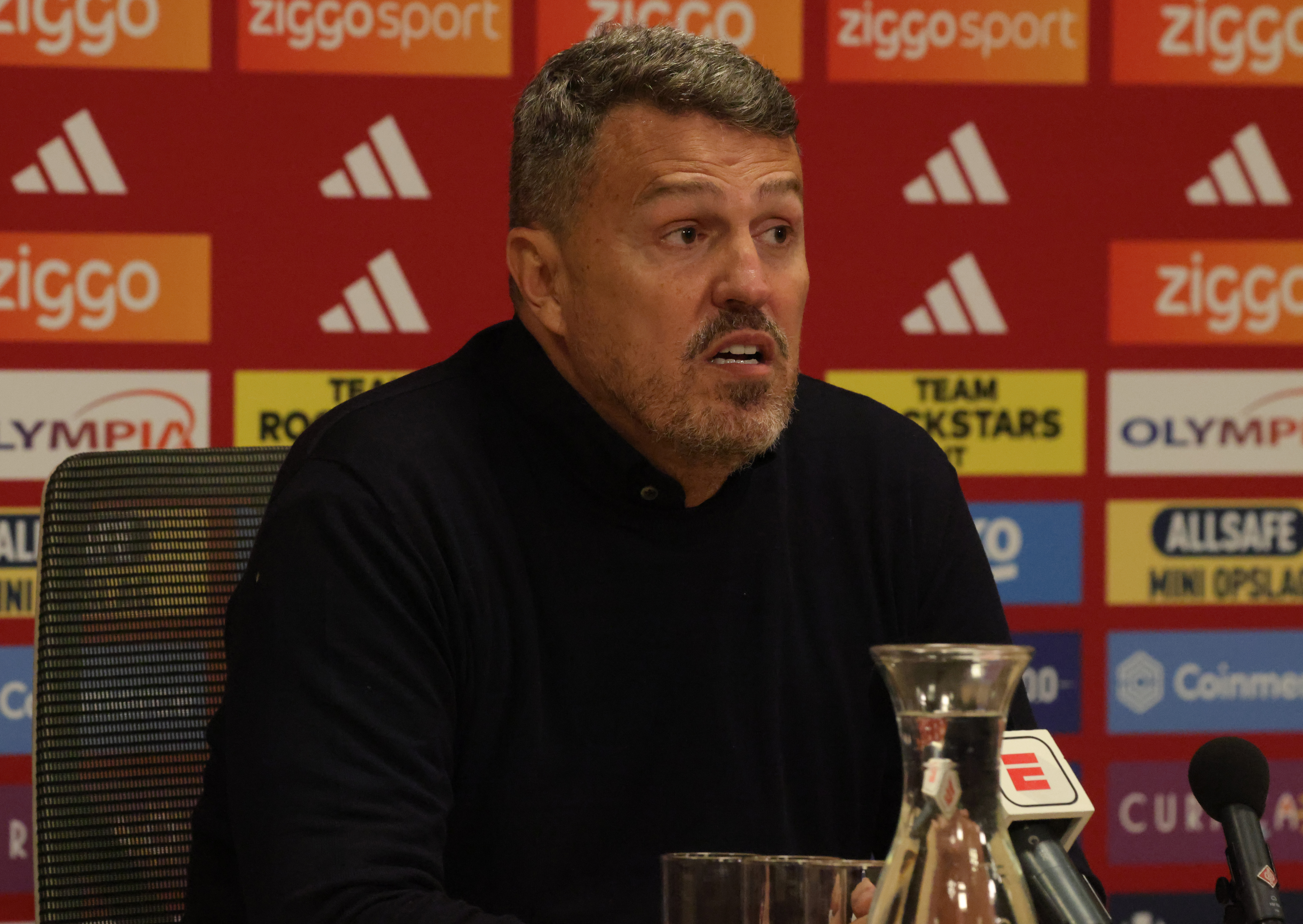
- García as caretaker manager of Ajax in 2026

Personal information
- Full name: Óscar García Junyent
- Date of birth: 26 April 1973 (age 53)
- Place of birth: Sabadell, Spain
- Height: 1.82 m (6 ft 0 in)
- Position: Attacking midfielder

Team information
- Current team: Pogoń Szczecin (manager)

Youth career
- 1980–1984: Mercantil
- 1984–1991: Barcelona

Senior career*
Years	Team	Apps	(Gls)
1991–1994	Barcelona B	79	(24)
1993–1999	Barcelona	69	(21)
1994–1995	→ Albacete (loan)	29	(2)
1999–2000	Valencia	20	(4)
2000–2004	Espanyol	51	(4)
2004–2005	Lleida	23	(3)
Total		271	(58)

International career
1989	Spain U16	1	(1)
1991	Spain U18	4	(1)
1991	Spain U19	1	(0)
1991	Spain U20	3	(0)
1992–1996	Spain U21	24	(12)
1996	Spain U23	4	(2)

Managerial career
- 2010–2012: Barcelona (youth)
- 2012–2013: Maccabi Tel Aviv
- 2013–2014: Brighton & Hove Albion
- 2014: Maccabi Tel Aviv
- 2014: Watford
- 2015–2017: Red Bull Salzburg
- 2017: Saint-Étienne
- 2018: Olympiacos
- 2019–2020: Celta
- 2021–2022: Reims
- 2023–2024: OH Leuven
- 2025: Guadalajara
- 2026: Jong Ajax
- 2026: Ajax (caretaker)
- 2026–: Pogoń Szczecin
Medal record
Men's football
Representing Spain
UEFA European Under-21 Championship
Runner-up	1996 Spain
Bronze medal – third place	1994 France
- * Club domestic league appearances and goals

Óscar García Junyent (born 26 April 1973), known simply as Óscar as a player, is a Spanish former professional footballer. He is currently manager of Ekstraklasa club Pogoń Szczecin.

He was a versatile attacking option as a player, able to feature as an attacking midfielder or a second striker. He spent most of his 14-year professional career with Barcelona, with relative impact, appearing for four other clubs. In La Liga, he amassed totals of 169 matches and 31 goals over 12 seasons, also representing Espanyol (four years), Albacete, Valencia and Lleida (one apiece).

García started working as a manager in 2009, going on to work in ten countries including his own. He won the Israeli Premier League with Maccabi Tel Aviv and two consecutive Bundesliga and Cup doubles with Red Bull Salzburg.

== Club career ==
Born in Sabadell, Barcelona, Catalonia, Óscar made his professional debut with Barcelona. Between 1992 and 1994 he played five La Liga matches for Barça who were champions each year and, following a loan at fellow top-division club Albacete, he returned and was often used (with good results) in a variety of attacking roles: during the 1995–96 season he scored ten league goals, most in the squad, even though he only started eleven of his 28 appearances; the team came out empty in silverware, however.

With his role gradually diminishing, Óscar joined Valencia, finishing off with Barcelona neighbours Espanyol (teaming up again with his brother Roger, for three seasons) and Lleida and retiring in June 2005 at the age of 32. On 7 January 2001, whilst playing for the second club against Numancia, he was taken to hospital after swallowing his tongue.

Óscar nearly signed for West Ham United in the summer of 2002, but an eventual deal fell through after a one week trial and he returned to Espanyol, with whom he never scored more than one goal per season in four years.

== International career ==
Óscar appeared for Spain at the 1996 Summer Olympics in Atlanta, scoring twice for the eventual quarter-finalists.

== Coaching career ==
=== Maccabi Tel Aviv and England ===
In late 2009, García joined former Barcelona coach Johan Cruyff's coaching staff in the Catalonia national team, as the Dutchman had just been appointed. On 22 May 2012, he received his first head coach appointment, signing a two-year contract with Maccabi Tel Aviv, where Cruyff's son Jordi acted as sporting director. Exactly one year later, after leading the club to the Israeli Premier League after a ten-year drought, he resigned from his post citing personal reasons.

García was unveiled as the new head coach of Football League Championship side Brighton & Hove Albion on 26 June 2013, replacing Gus Poyet. His first win came on 17 August, 1–0 at Birmingham City; he was November's Manager of the Month, with three wins and a draw. On 12 May 2014, following their play off semi-final defeat to Derby County, his offer of resignation was accepted by the board.

On 2 June 2014, García returned to Maccabi by signing a two-year contract, but left on 26 August due to ongoing war. A week later he was appointed at Watford, replacing Giuseppe Sannino. He was admitted to hospital with minor chest pains on 15 September, forcing him to miss the team's upcoming match with Blackpool. These health problems eventually led to him stepping down, two weeks later.

=== Red Bull Salzburg ===
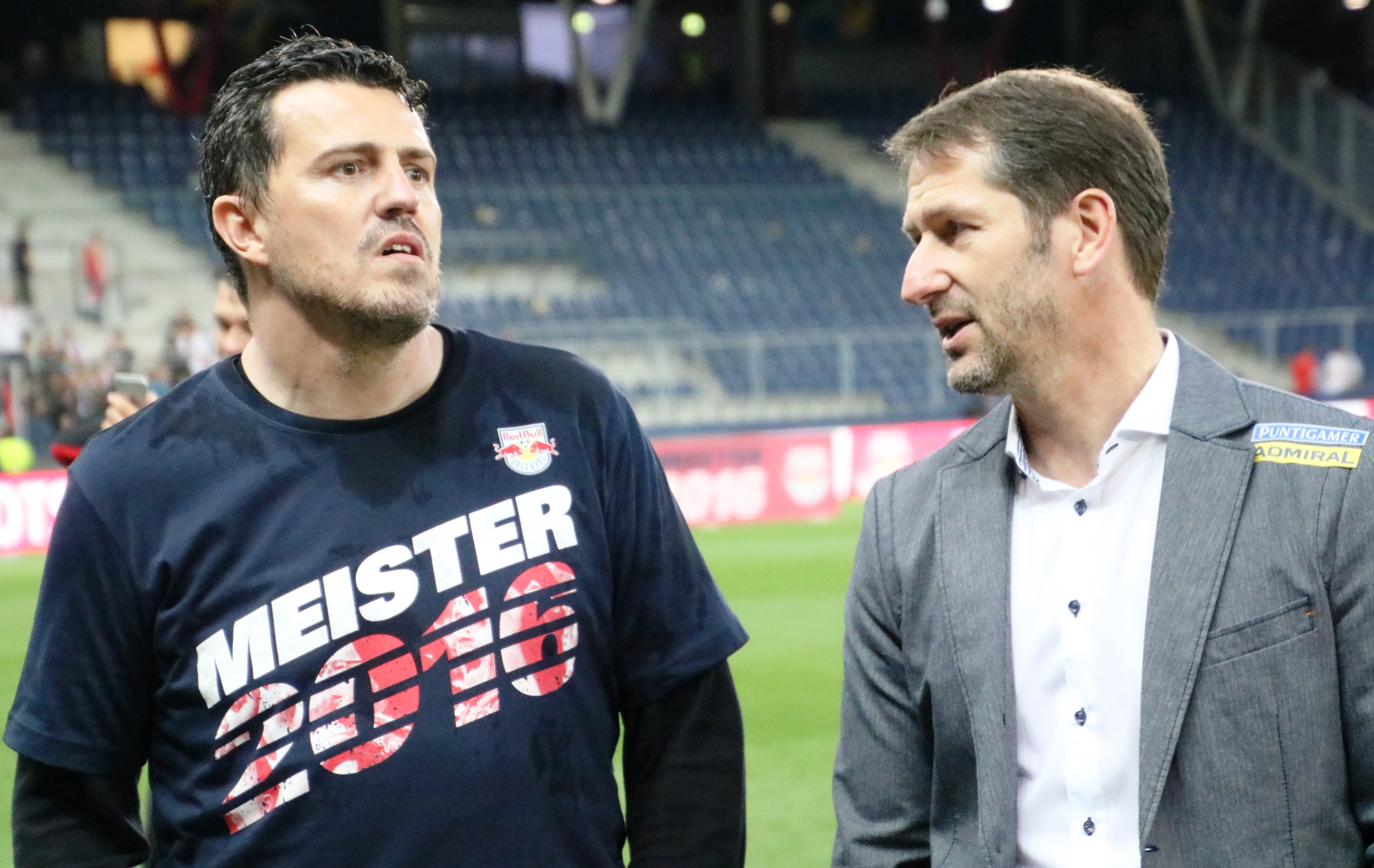
García and Sturm Graz manager Franco Foda in May 2016

Austrian double holders Red Bull Salzburg hired García on 28 December 2015, following the dismissal of Peter Zeidler. His team, for which fellow Spaniard Jonathan Soriano was the main striker, ended the season as national champions. On 19 May the latter scored a hat-trick in a 5–0 cup final victory over Admira Wacker to seal another double.

In 2016–17, Salzburg retained both major honours. After the loss of Soriano, García built the attack around South Korean Hwang Hee-chan.

=== Saint-Étienne ===
On 15 June 2017, Saint-Étienne signed García to a two-year contract. In November, however, following a 5–0 home loss against Lyon in the Derby du Rhone, he left the club by mutual agreement.

=== Olympiacos ===
Olympiacos announced García as their new manager on 5 January 2018, to replace Takis Lemonis. His contract was terminated by mutual consent on 3 April, following a 1–1 away draw with Levadiakos; the side had also been eliminated from the Greek Cup for a third consecutive year, and he was held partially responsible for the lack of dressing room, training and match discipline.

=== Celta ===
García had his first head coach experience in Spain in November 2019, when he took over for Fran Escribá at Celta de Vigo, who stood third from the bottom in the standings. His team stayed up on the last day of the season, as Leganés could not win their fixture.

On 9 November 2020, after only one win in nine matches of the new campaign, García was dismissed.

=== Reims ===
García returned to the French Ligue 1 in June 2021, being appointed at Reims on a three-year deal. Starting with a goalless draw at Nice on 8 August, he won on his fifth attempt with a 2–0 victory at Rennes.

García's one full season at the Stade Auguste-Delaune resulted in a 12th-place finish. He was relieved of his duties on 13 October 2022, with his team 15th in the table, and was replaced by his assistant Will Still.

=== OH Leuven ===
On 3 November 2023, García was hired at Oud-Heverlee Leuven, taking over a club in the Belgian Pro League relegation zone after 12 games. He eventually managed to avoid a drop, with a 1–0 win against Mechelen in injury time.

One year after arriving, with the side again in the bottom part of the table, García was dismissed alongside his staff.

=== Guadalajara ===
On 2 December 2024, Guadalajara of the Liga MX announced García as their new head coach from January 2025. He was fired three months later, less than 24 hours before a game at UNAM.

=== Ajax ===
On 10 February 2026, García was appointed at Jong Ajax, placed bottom in the Eerste Divisie; he arrived shortly after Willem Weijs was relieved of his duties by the newly installed technical director Jordi Cruyff. He managed some improvement and, on 8 March, became caretaker manager of the first team in place of the dismissed Fred Grim, who returned to his role in the academy.

=== Pogoń Szczecin ===
On 23 June 2026, García became coach of Ekstraklasa club Pogoń Szczecin on a three-year contract.

== Personal life ==
García's brothers, Roger and Genís, were also footballers. All youth products of Barcelona, they had however different fates as professionals (especially the latter).

On 17 June 1997, during the final of the Copa Catalunya, all three appeared with the first team in a 3–1 loss to Europa.

== Managerial statistics ==
As of match played 20 November 2026

Team	Nat	From	To	Record				
Team	Nat	From	To	P	W	D	L	Win %
Maccabi Tel Aviv	(Israel)	22 May 2012	22 May 2013	43	28	7	8	65.12
Brighton & Hove Albion	(England)	26 June 2013	12 May 2014	53	21	16	16	39.62
Maccabi Tel Aviv	(Israel)	2 June 2014	26 August 2014	7	3	2	2	42.86
Watford	(England)	2 September 2014	29 September 2014	4	1	2	1	25.00
Red Bull Salzburg	(Austria)	28 December 2015	15 June 2017	73	51	12	10	69.86
Saint-Étienne	(France)	15 June 2017	15 November 2017	13	5	4	4	38.46
Olympiacos	(Greece)	6 January 2018	3 April 2018	13	6	5	2	46.15
Celta	(Spain)	9 November 2019	9 November 2020	38	8	17	13	21.05
Reims	(France)	23 June 2021	13 October 2022	51	14	19	18	27.45
OH Leuven	(Belgium)	3 November 2023	22 November 2024	44	12	16	16	27.27
Guadalajara	(Mexico)	2 December 2024	2 March 2025	12	5	3	4	41.67
Jong Ajax	(Netherlands)	10 February 2026	8 March 2026	5	2	1	2	40.00
Ajax	(Netherlands)	8 March 2026	24 May 2026	10	4	4	2	40.00
Pogoń Szczecin	(Poland)	23 June 2026	Present	15	7	3	5	46.67
Total				382	167	112	103	43.72

== Honours ==
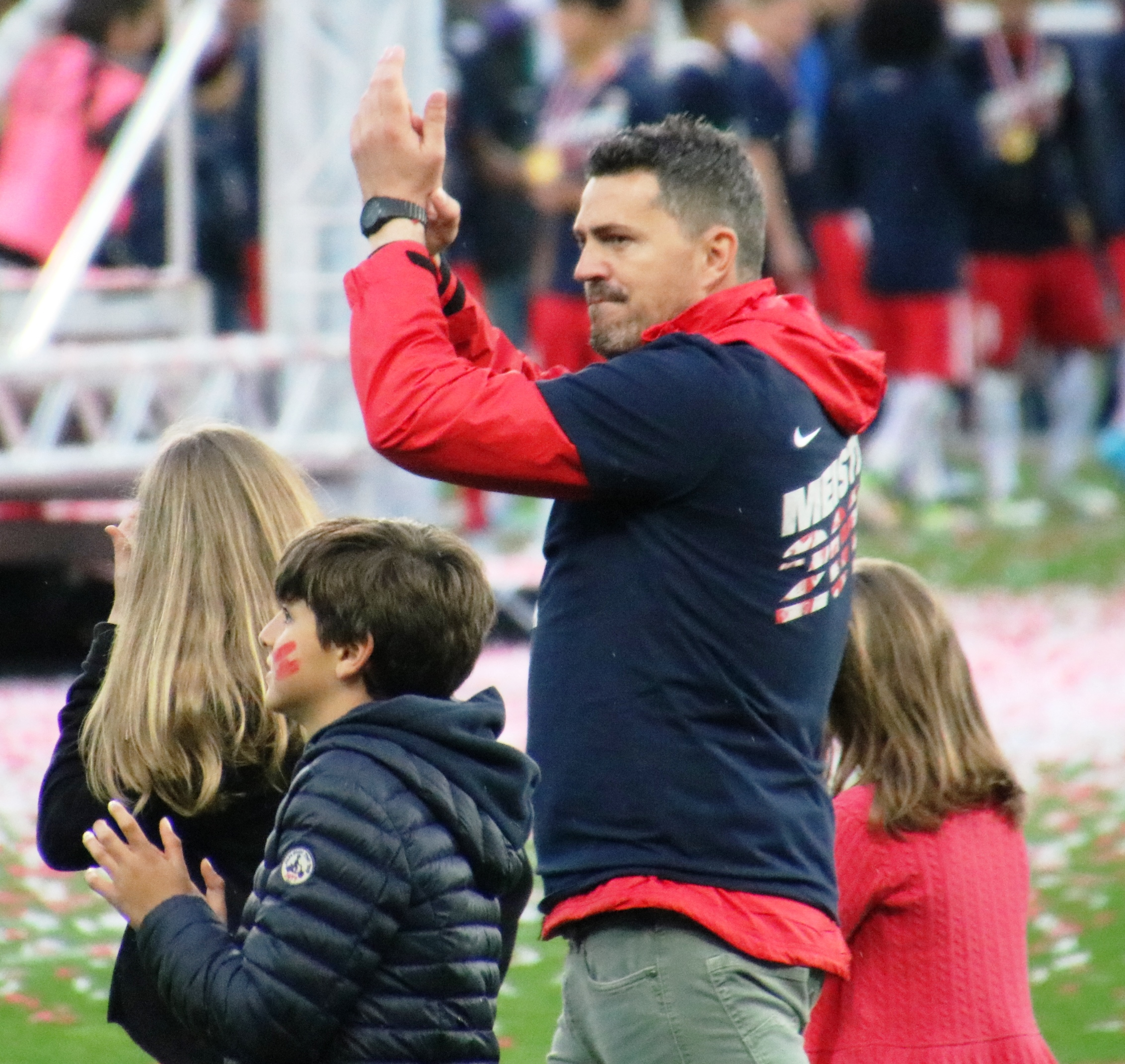
García celebrating Salzburg's Bundesliga win in May 2016

=== Player ===
Barcelona

- La Liga: 1992–93, 1993–94, 1997–98, 1998–99
- Copa del Rey: 1996–97, 1997–98
- UEFA Cup Winners' Cup: 1996–97
- UEFA Super Cup: 1997

Valencia

- Supercopa de España: 1999
- UEFA Champions League runner-up: 1999–2000

Spain U-21

- UEFA European Under-21 Championship runner-up: 1996; third place 1994

=== Manager ===
Maccabi Tel Aviv

- Israeli Premier League: 2012–13

Red Bull Salzburg

- Austrian Football Bundesliga: 2015–16, 2016–17
- Austrian Cup: 2015–16, 2016–17

Individual

- Football League Manager of the Month: November 2013
