= Jon Bakero (footballer, born 1971) =

Spanish footballer

Personal information
- Full name: Jon Bakero Escudero
- Date of birth: 16 July 1971 (age 55)
- Place of birth: Goizueta, Spain
- Height: 1.72 m (5 ft 8 in)
- Position: Forward

Youth career
- Real Sociedad

Senior career*
| Years | Team | Apps | (Gls) |
| 1989–1992 | Real Sociedad B | 83 | (5) |
| 1992–1997 | Barcelona B | 105 | (28) |
| 1995–1996 | → Almería (loan) | 29 | (5) |
| 1997–1998 | Málaga | 19 | (3) |
| 1998–1999 | Gavà | 14 | (0) |
| 1999–2001 | Universidad Las Palmas | 34 | (4) |
| 2001–2002 | Gáldar | | |
| Total | | 284 | (45) |

Managerial career
- 2010: Polonia Warsaw (assistant)
- * Club domestic league appearances and goals

Jon Bakero Escudero (born 16 July 1971) is a Spanish former professional footballer who played as a forward.

He appeared in 153 Segunda División matches over six seasons, scoring a total of 35 goals for Barcelona B, Almería and Universidad de Las Palmas.

== Club career ==
Bakero was born in Goizueta, Navarre. He was a product of Real Sociedad's youth system, spending his first three seasons as a senior with their reserves in the Segunda División B.

In 1992, Bakero signed with FC Barcelona, being assigned to the B team in the Segunda División. He played his first match at the professional level on 20 September, coming on as a late substitute in a 2–1 away loss against Real Madrid Castilla.

Bakero scored his first goal in the second tier on 16 January 1993, the only in the home win over CD Lugo. He managed a squad and career-best 13 in the 1994–95 campaign, for the sixth-placed side. During his spell at the Mini Estadi, he also served a loan at UD Almería of the same league.

From 1997 to 1999, Bakero competed in division three. He achieved promotion with Málaga CF, being relegated with CF Gavà.

Bakero helped Universidad de Las Palmas CF reach the second division in 1999–2000, the first time in the club's history. With 19 games and two goals from the player, they were immediately relegated the following season as third from the bottom.

Bakero retired in 2002 at the age of 31, after a stint with amateurs UD Gáldar in the Canary Islands. In January 2010, he joined the coaching staff of his older brother José Mari at Ekstraklasa's Polonia Warsaw.

== Personal life ==
Bakero's brothers Santiago and José Mari were also footballers and forwards. His nephew, named Jon as him, is also a professional player.

== Career statistics ==
Appearances and goals by club, season and competition
| Club | Season | League | | | Cup | | Other | | Total | |
| Club | Season | Division | Apps | Goals | Apps | Goals | Apps | Goals | Apps | Goals |
|---|---|---|---|---|---|---|---|---|---|---|
| Real Sociedad B | 1989–90 | Segunda División B | 20 | 1 | – | | 0 | 0 | 20 | 1 |
| Real Sociedad B | 1990–91 | Segunda División B | 27 | 3 | – | | 5 (Note: Appearances in Segunda División B play-offs) | 0 | 32 | 3 |
| Real Sociedad B | 1991–92 | Segunda División B | 36 | 1 | – | | 0 | 0 | 36 | 1 |
| Real Sociedad B | Total | | 83 | 5 | 0 | 0 | 5 | 0 | 88 | 5 |
| Barcelona B | 1992–93 | Segunda División | 14 | 3 | – | | 0 | 0 | 14 | 3 |
| Barcelona B | 1993–94 | Segunda División | 27 | 7 | – | | 0 | 0 | 27 | 7 |
| Barcelona B | 1994–95 | Segunda División | 35 | 13 | – | | 0 | 0 | 35 | 13 |
| Barcelona B | 1995–96 | Segunda División | 0 | 0 | – | | 0 | 0 | 0 | 0 |
| Barcelona B | 1996–97 | Segunda División | 29 | 5 | – | | 0 | 0 | 29 | 5 |
| Barcelona B | Total | | 105 | 28 | 0 | 0 | 0 | 0 | 105 | 28 |
| Almería (loan) | 1995–96 | Segunda División | 29 | 5 | 2 (Note: Appearances in Copa del Rey) | 0 | 0 | 0 | 31 | 5 |
| Málaga | 1997–98 | Segunda División B | 19 | 3 | 0 | 0 | 4 | 0 | 23 | 3 |
| Gavà | 1998–99 | Segunda División B | 14 | 0 | 0 | 0 | 0 | 0 | 14 | 0 |
| Universidad Las Palmas | 1999–00 | Segunda División B | 15 | 2 | 0 | 0 | 4 | 1 | 19 | 3 |
| Universidad Las Palmas | 2000–01 | Segunda División | 19 | 2 | 1 | 0 | 0 | 0 | 20 | 2 |
| Universidad Las Palmas | Total | | 34 | 4 | 1 | 0 | 4 | 1 | 39 | 5 |
| Career total | | | 284 | 45 | 3 | 0 | 13 | 1 | 300 | 46 |
