= Igor Engonga =

Equatoguinean footballer (born 1995)

Personal information
- Full name: Igor Engonga Noval
- Date of birth: 4 January 1995 (age 31)
- Place of birth: Santander, Spain
- Height: 1.85 m (6 ft 1 in)
- Position: Centre-back

Team information
- Current team: Naval

Youth career
- Amistad
- Reocin
- 2007–2012: Racing Santander
- 2012–2013: Gimnástica Torrelavega
- 2013–2014: Celta

Senior career*
Years	Team	Apps	(Gls)
2013	Gimnástica Torrelavega	14	(3)
2014–2015	Celta B	0	(0)
2014–2015	→ Tropezón (loan)	25	(0)
2015–2016	Portugalete	25	(0)
2016–2019	Almería B	75	(7)
2019–2020	Doxa Drama	1	(0)
2020–2022	Futuro Kings		
2023–	Naval	26	(1)

International career^{‡}
2015–2020	Equatorial Guinea	23	(1)
- * Club domestic league appearances and goals as of 12 October 2024 ‡ National team caps and goals as of 11 November 2020

Igor Engonga Noval (born 4 January 1995) is a professional footballer who plays for Tercera Federación club Naval. Mainly a centre-back, he can also operate as a central midfielder. Born in Spain, he played for the Equatorial Guinea national team.

== Early life ==
Engonga was born in Santander, Cantabria to Spanish parents.

== Club career ==
Engonga graduated from Gimnástica de Torrelavega's youth setup. He made his senior debuts in the 2012–13 campaign, being relegated from Segunda División B.

On 13 December 2013 Engonga joined Celta de Vigo, being assigned to the Juvenil squad. On 7 August 2014 he joined third-tier CD Tropezón, in a season-long loan deal.

On 31 July 2015, Engonga moved to Club Portugalete also in the third division. The following 16 July, he signed for Tercera División club UD Almería B.

In August 2019, Engonga joined Greek Super League Two club Doxa Drama FC.

== International career ==
Born in Spain, Engonga is of Equatoguinean descent through his paternal grandfather, Vicente Engonga Nguema, who was born in Bisabat, Kié-Ntem.

On 7 January 2015 Engonga made his full international debut, coming on as a substitute in a 1–1 friendly draw against Cape Verde. A day later, he was included in Esteban Becker's 23-man list for the 2015 Africa Cup of Nations, but did not play at the tournament, in which his country finished fourth on home soil.

Engonga scored his first goal for Equatorial Guinea on 6 June 2015, the only goal in the 17th minute to win an away friendly against Andorra.

=== International goals ===
No.	Date	Venue	Opponent	Score	Result	Competition
1.	6 June 2015	Estadi Comunal, Andorra la Vella, Andorra	Andorra	1–0	1–0	Friendly

== Personal life ==
Engonga is the son of former Equatorial Guinea national coach Óscar Engonga and the nephew of former Spain international footballer Vicente Engonga.

== Statistics ==
=== International ===
As of 11 October 2016

Equatorial Guinea
Year	Apps	Goals
2015	6	1
2016	5	0
Total	11	1
