= Lorenzo Sanz =

Spanish businessman (1943–2020)

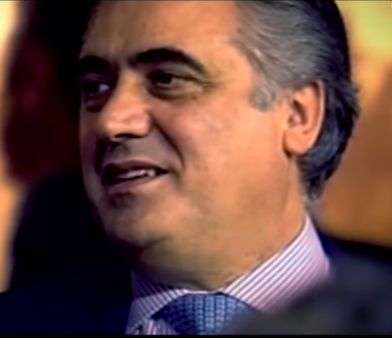

14th President of Real Madrid
- In office 26 November 1995 – 16 July 2000
- Preceded by: Ramón Mendoza
- Succeeded by: Florentino Pérez

Personal details
- Born: Lorenzo Sanz Mancebo; 9 August 1943 Madrid, Spain
- Died: 21 March 2020 (aged 76) Madrid, Spain
- Spouse: María Luz Durán Muñoz (m. 1970)
- Children: 5, including Lorenzo, Paco and Fernando
- Relatives: Míchel Salgado (son-in-law)
- Occupation: Real estate developer
- Known for: President of Real Madrid and owner of Málaga

Lorenzo Sanz Mancebo (9 August 1943 – 21 March 2020) was a Spanish businessman who was the 14th President of Real Madrid and a former owner of Málaga.

== Early life ==
He was born in August 1943 in a humble family in Madrid, being the eldest of ten siblings. During his youth, he was a goalkeeper for several soccer teams in Madrid, such as Puerta Bonita. He began his business career with a wallpaper factory. He was linked to Fuerza Nueva, an extreme right-wing party for which he managed advertising. Married to María Luz Durán Muñoz, he was the father of five children. The first son, Lorenzo, was a basketball player and played two seasons with Real Madrid's first team and later as technical director of the section for two seasons. The following sons, Paco -who played eight games in the First Division- and Fernando -who played four seasons with Real Madrid's first team and seven with Málaga-, were soccer players and later presidents of Granada Club de Fútbol and Málaga Club de Fútbol, respectively. Their daughters are María Luz "Malula" (1975), who is married to former Real Madrid player Míchel Salgado, and Diana (1977).

== Professional life ==
In 1985, Sanz left Blas Piñar's notary and was appointed as a member of the board of directors of Real Madrid, chaired by Ramón Mendoza, while he shifted his professional activities towards the real-estate sector by joining the Swiss Jose Antonio Roth, a wealthy developer who controlled the real-estate development company Barada ("Grupo Barada"). Sanz would borrow funds from Grupo Barada to acquire land through his own companies (Nuada and Renfisa) and then use his influence through Real Madrid's presidential box, frequently visited by politicians and the spanish jet set. Once permission had been gained, the land was sold back to Barada. In 1995 Lorenzo Sanz became president of Real Madrid after covering, with the economic support of Barada, the majority of the 1,045 million pesetas of financial guarantees required by LaLiga. During the 2000s Lorenzo Sanz was attributed a net worth of 20,000 million pesetas (120 million euros), below Roth's wealth, who managed his controlling stake in Grupo Barada through the shell company Merenco Capital B.V., registered in the Netherlands. In the early 2000s, after Mr. Sanz lost the elections of Real Madrid, he was sued by Grupo Barada (under new management, after Mr. Roth's dismissal as chairman) to which Mr. Sanz's companies owed around 43 million. In 2008, Barada sued Mr. Sanz under alleged fraud, corporate crime, and asset concealment over a land parcel that Mr. Sanz sold in 2003 to Barada's subsidiary Numan for 10 million, and which he allegedly sold again in 2004 to another developer for 53 million. In 2018, he was sentenced by the Provincial Court of Madrid to 3 years in prison and ordered to pay a fine of 1.2 million euros for the “intentional” concealment of almost six million euros from the tax authorities in his income tax returns for the years 2008 and 2009.

== President of Real Madrid ==
Sanz was a director of Real Madrid from 1985 to 1995. He then became President of Real Madrid on 26 November 1995 after Ramón Mendoza was forced to resign due to the economic, social, and sporting problems of the club. Sanz tried to turn the club around by bringing in star players like Davor Šuker and Predrag Mijatović with his own money. This led to a long-awaited UEFA Champions League victory, which Real Madrid had not won since 1966, as the club won both the 1998 and 2000 finals.

Following the two Champions League trophies, Sanz decided to hold an early election to the club presidency in 2000, but eventually lost to Florentino Pérez, and vacated the presidency on July 16. He then tried unsuccessfully twice to regain his former position as the president of Real Madrid, and failed in a bid to take over Parma.

== Negotiations with Parma ==
Between June 2005 and January 2006, Sanz was negotiating with Italian club Parma in Amministrazione Straordinaria to become the club's new owner. Guido Angiolini and Enrico Bondi, the two officers appointed by the Italian government to restore Parma, and its main sponsor Parmalat, were the two people involved in the operations with Sanz. The first time Parma announced negotiations with Sanz was in August 2005. Both President Angiolini and government-appointed administrator Enrico Bondi asked for €27.5 million, but the negotiations were not as smooth as some predicted.

Until January 2006, the Sanz family was still transacting business with Bondi and Angiolini, but to no avail. In an interview with Gazzetta dello Sport in January 2006, President Angiolini stated that, "If, by the 16th, the deal with the Sanz family has not been closed, we will set about finding a new buyer." Sanz had seemed the most likely buyer of the club in August 2005 when he made an initial payment of €7.5 million ($9.07 million) on the full price of €27.5 million. However, he did not pay the outstanding €20 million. Parma administrators stated that after 16 January 2006, the club was free to find other interested buyers as the contract with Sanz expired on 15 January 2006.

Other interested buyers included the owner of Spain's Alamak Espana Trade, Russian oligarch Abram Reznikov. The uncertainty over the club's future had become a source of increasing frustration for Parma supporters. The deal with Sanz was a big dilemma for the Parma fans. In some papers, this deal was referred to as "The never ending story." Parma supporters were longing for a positive ending. Sanz visited Parma a couple of times, and he even turned up at the Stadio Ennio Tardini to follow some of Parma's matches in Serie A. Because of his withdrawal from the deal and failure to pay the rest of the sum of €20.5 million, Lorenzo Sanz Senior and Lorenzo Sanz Junior lost much of their credibility.

== Later years ==
Sanz announced in 2006 that he was putting himself up for election once again for the vacant President's position at Real Madrid, losing it to Ramón Calderón.

In July 2006, Sanz purchased Málaga. He sold the club in 2010 to a Qatari investor for a sum of €50 million.

In May 2008, it was reported that he was looking to buy Italian club Bari, and that the Bari owners had given him ten days to close the deal, which was rumored to be around €15 million.

== Personal life ==
Sanz was the father-in-law of former Real Madrid and Spain national team defender Míchel Salgado, who married his daughter Malula. Sanz's two sons, Paco and Fernando, and his grandson Paco Sanz Mora, were also professional footballers. As the owner of Málaga, he entrusted Fernando with the presidency of the club.

Sanz died in the evening of 21 March 2020 at the age of 76, after testing positive for COVID-19.

== Honours ==
=== Football ===
Real Madrid:

- La Liga:
  - 1996–97
- Supercopa de España:
  - 1997
- UEFA Champions League:
  - 1997–98, 1999–2000
- Intercontinental Cup:
  - 1998

=== Basketball ===
Real Madrid Basketball:

- Liga ACB:
  - 1999–2000
- FIBA EuroCup:
  - 1996–97
