= Antonio Gento =

Spanish footballer (1940–2020)

Personal information
- Full name: Antonio Gento López
- Date of birth: 25 October 1940
- Place of birth: Guarnizo, Spain
- Date of death: 25 December 2020 (aged 80)
- Height: 1.69 m (5 ft 7 in)
- Position: Forward

Senior career*
Years	Team	Apps	(Gls)
1958–1962	Plus Ultra	57	(24)
1962	Real Madrid	3	(0)
1962–1963	Levante	11	(3)
1963–1968	Racing Santander	117	(40)
1968–1971	Real Oviedo	71	(14)
1971–1973	Racing Santander	15	(2)
1974–1975	Unión Club Astillero		
Total		274	(83)
- * Club domestic league appearances and goals

Antonio Gento López (25 October 1940 – 25 December 2020) was a Spanish professional footballer who played as a forward.

== Career ==
Born in Guarnizo, Gento played for Plus Ultra, Real Madrid, Levante, Racing Santander, Real Oviedo and SD Unión Club.

== Personal life ==
His brothers Paco Gento and Julio Gento were also footballers. His nephews were also athletes – José Luis Llorente and Toñín Llorente played basketball, whilst Paco Llorente and Julio Llorente were footballers. Grand-nephew Marcos Llorente, son of Paco Llorente, was also a footballer.

He died on 25 December 2020, aged 80.
