= Santiago Bakero =

Spanish footballer

Personal information
- Full name: Santiago Bakero Escudero
- Date of birth: 31 January 1958 (age 68)
- Place of birth: Goizueta, Spain
- Height: 1.71 m (5 ft 7 in)
- Positions: Forward; right-back

Senior career*
Years	Team	Apps	(Gls)
1978–1983	Palencia	122	(22)
1983–1986	Hércules	92	(9)
1986–1989	Real Sociedad	65	(3)
Total		279	(34)
- * Club domestic league appearances and goals

Santiago Bakero Escudero (born 31 January 1958) is a Spanish former professional footballer who played as a forward and a right-back.

== Club career ==
Born in Goizueta, Navarre, Bakero represented Palencia CF and Hércules CF in the Segunda División. He played his first match in the competition while in service of the former club on 2 September 1979 in a 1–1 home draw against Algeciras CF, and scored his first goal the following 20 January to close a 2–2 away draw with Recreativo de Huelva.

Bakero signed with Hércules in early 1983, achieving promotion to La Liga at the end of his first full season and remaining there a further two years. His debut took place on 2 September 1984, in a 1–0 win at Real Zaragoza where he played the full 90 minutes.

In late 1986, Bakero joined Real Sociedad, being often deployed as a right-back and sharing teams with his younger sibling José Mari. He contributed 13 league appearances during the campaign as the side won the Copa del Rey (three matches from the player, including the 10–1 trouncing of Mallorca Atlético in the quarter-finals).

Bakero retired at the age of 31.

== Personal life ==
Bakero's brothers José Mari and Jon were also footballers, and forwards. His nephew, also named Jon, was also involved in the sport.

== Career statistics ==
Appearances and goals by club, season and competition
Club	Season	League			National Cup		League Cup		Continental		Total	
Club	Season	Division	Apps	Goals	Apps	Goals	Apps	Goals	Apps	Goals	Apps	Goals
Palencia	1978–79	Segunda División B	35	5	2	0	–		–		37	5
Palencia	1979–80	Segunda División	27	6	8	0	–		–		35	6
Palencia	1980–81	Segunda División	13	1	2	0	–		–		15	1
Palencia	1981–82	Segunda División B	32	8	3	1	–		–		35	9
Palencia	1982–83	Segunda División	15	2	2	0	0	0	–		17	2
Palencia	Total		122	22	17	1	0	0	0	0	139	23
Hércules	1982–83	Segunda División	0	0	0	0	5 (Note: Appearances in Copa de la Liga (Segunda División))	0	–		5	0
Hércules	1983–84	Segunda División	23	2	4	1	2	1	–		29	4
Hércules	1984–85	La Liga	30	0	5 (Note: Appearances in Copa del Rey)	0	0	0	–		35	0
Hércules	1985–86	La Liga	31	7	4	1	2 (Note: Appearances in Copa de la Liga)	0	–		37	8
Hércules	1986–87	Segunda División	8	0	0	0	–		–		8	0
Hércules	Total		92	9	13	2	9	1	0	0	114	12
Real Sociedad	1986–87	La Liga	13	0	3	0	–		–		16	0
Real Sociedad	1987–88	La Liga	33	2	8	1	–		4 (Note: Appearances in UEFA Cup Winners' Cup)	0	45	3
Real Sociedad	1988–89	La Liga	19	1	3	0	–		6 (Note: Appearances in UEFA Cup)	0	28	1
Real Sociedad	Total		65	3	14	1	0	0	10	0	89	4
Career total			279	34	44	4	9	1	10	0	342	39
