= SD Unión Club =

Association football club in Spain

Unión Club Astillero
- Full name: Sociedad Deportiva Unión Club de El Astillero
- Founded: 1922
- Ground: La Planchada, El Astillero, Cantabria, Spain
- Capacity: 3,000
- League: Segunda Regional – Group C
- 2024–25: Segunda Regional – Group B, 7th of 18
Home colours	Away colours

Sociedad Deportiva Unión Club de El Astillero is a Spanish football club based in El Astillero, in the autonomous community of Cantabria. Founded in 1922, the club plays in Segunda Regional – Group C.

== History ==
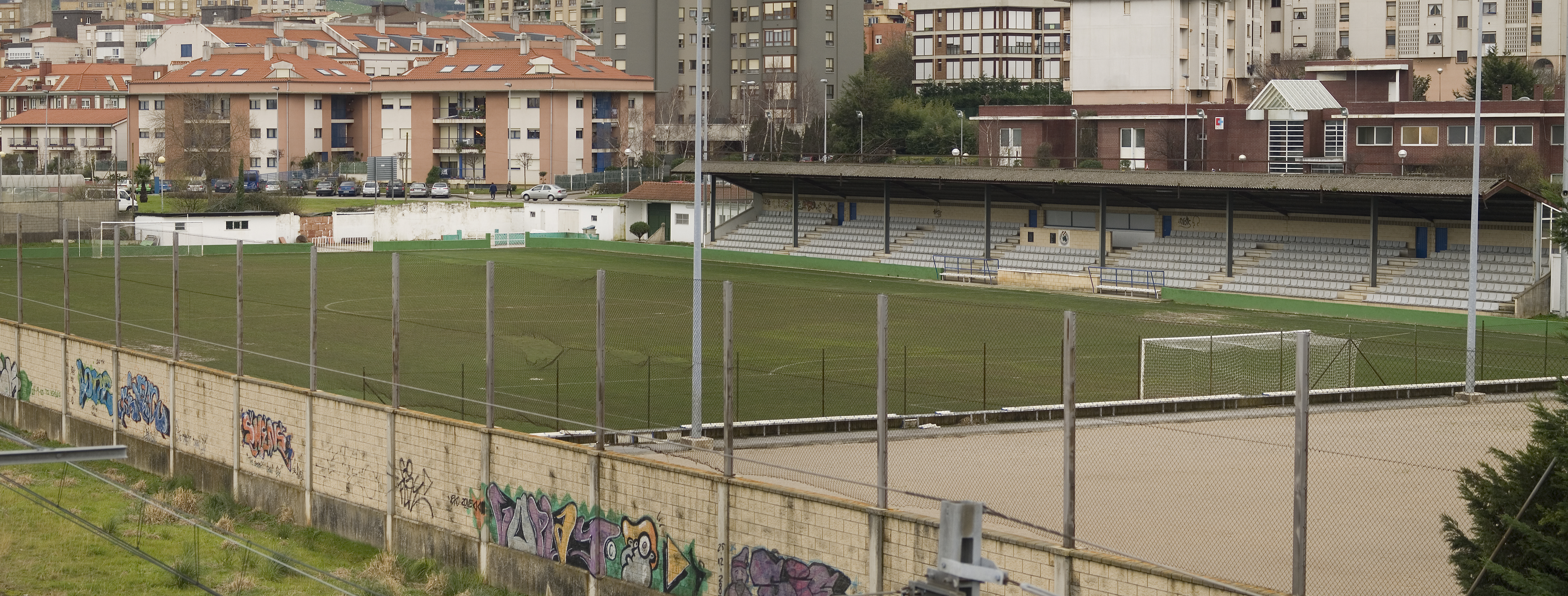
Unión Club's home stadium, Campos de Sport La Planchada

Founded in 1922 after the merger of three clubs in the city: Astillero FC, Selección and SIGVA, Unión Club ceased activities in 1936 due to the imminency of the Spanish Civil War, only returning in 1945. They first reached the Tercera División in 1960.

In the 1987–88 season, the club finished in the first position of their group, but gave up promotion to Segunda División B. In January 2021, the club was expelled from their group of the Segunda Regional de Cantabria, being unable to play in the 2021–22 season.

In August 2024, Unión returned to an active status.

== Season to season ==
Season	Tier	Division	Place	Copa del Rey
1928–29	4	1ª Reg.	4th	
1929–30	5	2ª Reg.	1st	
1930–31	4	1ª Reg.	3rd	
1931–32	5	2ª Reg.	4th	
1932–33	5	2ª Reg.	5th	
1933–34	5	2ª Reg.	6th	
1934–35	6	3ª Reg. P.	1st	
1935–36	5	2ª Reg.	1st	
1936–1945	DNP			
1945–46	5	2ª Reg.	2nd	
1946–47	4	1ª Reg.	3rd	
1947–48	4	1ª Reg.	3rd	
1948–49	4	1ª Reg.	9th	
1949–50	4	1ª Reg.	7th	
1950–51	4	1ª Reg.	10th	
1951–52	4	1ª Reg.	7th	
1952–53	4	1ª Reg.	8th	
1953–54	4	1ª Reg.	8th	
1954–55	4	1ª Reg.	6th	
1955–56	4	1ª Reg.	5th	

Season	Tier	Division	Place	Copa del Rey
1956–57	4	1ª Reg.	2nd	
1957–58	4	1ª Reg.	2nd	
1958–59	4	1ª Reg.	3rd	
1959–60	4	1ª Reg.	1st	
1960–61	3	3ª	13th	
1961–62	4	1ª Reg.	3rd	
1962–63	4	1ª Reg.	1st	
1963–64	3	3ª	13th	
1964–65	3	3ª	3rd	
1965–66	3	3ª	8th	
1966–67	3	3ª	14th	
1967–68	4	1ª Reg.	3rd	
1968–69	4	1ª Reg.	2nd	
1969–70	4	1ª Reg.	5th	
1970–71	4	1ª Reg.	1st	
1971–72	3	3ª	18th	First round
1972–73	4	1ª Reg.	6th	
1973–74	4	1ª Reg.	1st	
1974–75	3	3ª	20th	First round
1975–76	4	Reg. Pref.	3rd	

Season	Tier	Division	Place	Copa del Rey
1976–77	4	Reg. Pref.	8th	
1977–78	5	Reg. Pref.	7th	
1978–79	5	Reg. Pref.	8th	
1979–80	5	Reg. Pref.	3rd	
1980–81	4	3ª	15th	
1981–82	4	3ª	16th	
1982–83	4	3ª	10th	
1983–84	4	3ª	19th	
1984–85	5	Reg. Pref.	1st	
1985–86	5	Reg. Pref.	1st	
1986–87	4	3ª	4th	
1987–88	4	3ª	1st	First round
1988–89	4	3ª	6th	
1989–90	4	3ª	18th	
1990–91	5	Reg. Pref.	2nd	
1991–92	4	3ª	12th	
1992–93	4	3ª	12th	
1993–94	4	3ª	9th	
1994–95	4	3ª	11th	
1995–96	4	3ª	17th	

Season	Tier	Division	Place	Copa del Rey
1996–97	4	3ª	17th	
1997–98	4	3ª	11th	
1998–99	4	3ª	17th	
1999–2000	5	Reg. Pref.	16th	
2000–01	6	1ª Reg.	3rd	
2001–02	6	1ª Reg.	2nd	
2002–03	5	Reg. Pref.	5th	
2003–04	5	Reg. Pref.	10th	
2004–05	5	Reg. Pref.	12th	
2005–06	5	Reg. Pref.	13th	
2006–07	5	Reg. Pref.	18th	
2007–08	6	1ª Reg.	5th	
2008–09	5	Reg. Pref.	11th	
2009–10	5	Reg. Pref.	13th	
2010–11	5	Reg. Pref.	16th	
2011–12	6	1ª Reg.	16th	
2012–13	7	2ª Reg.	5th	
2013–14	7	2ª Reg.	1st	
2014–15	6	1ª Reg.	17th	
2015–16	7	2ª Reg.	17th	

Season	Tier	Division	Place	Copa del Rey
2016–17	7	2ª Reg.	9th	
2017–18	7	2ª Reg.	9th	
2018–19	7	2ª Reg.	4th	
2019–20	7	2ª Reg.	8th	
2020–21	7	2ª Reg.	(R)	
2021–22	DNP			
2022–23	DNP			
2023–24	DNP			
2024–25	8	2ª Reg.	7th	
2025–26	8	2ª Reg.	1st	
2026–27	7	1ª Reg.		

- 23 seasons in Tercera División
