= Paco Sanz (footballer, born 2004) =

Spanish footballer

Personal information
- Full name: Paco Sanz Mora
- Date of birth: 15 November 2004 (age 21)
- Place of birth: Aravaca, Spain
- Height: 1.88 m (6 ft 2 in)
- Position: Centre-back

Team information
- Current team: Alavés B
- Number: 12

Youth career
- 2013–2019: Aravaca
- 2019–2022: Getafe
- 2022–2023: Almería

Senior career*
Years	Team	Apps	(Gls)
2023–2025	Almería B	52	(2)
2024–2025	Almería	1	(0)
2025–	Alavés B	29	(0)
- * Club domestic league appearances and goals as of 7 May 2026

Paco Sanz Mora (born 15 November 2004) is a Spanish professional footballer who plays as a centre-back for Deportivo Alavés B.

== Career ==
Born in Aravaca, Community of Madrid, Sanz began his career with hometown side Aravaca CF before joining Getafe CF's youth sides in 2019. In 2022, he moved to UD Almería and was assigned to the Juvenil A squad.

Promoted to the reserves in Tercera Federación ahead of the 2023–24 season, Sanz made his senior debut on 10 September 2023, starting in a 0–0 away draw against Atlético Malagueño. He scored his first senior goal the following 7 January, netting the B's fifth in a 6–0 home routing of FC Málaga City.

Sanz made his first team – and La Liga – debut on 25 May 2024, coming on as a second-half substitute for Aleksandar Radovanović in a 6–1 home routing of Cádiz CF, as both sides were already relegated. He would feature exclusively with the B's the following season, now in Segunda Federación.

On 20 July 2025, Sanz signed a four-year contract with Deportivo Alavés, being initially assigned to the B-team also in the fourth division.

== Personal life ==
Sanz's family is actively involved in football: his father also known as Paco and uncle Fernando were both footballers; his uncle was also a centre-back, while his father was a midfielder. His grandfather Lorenzo was president of Real Madrid and later an owner of Málaga CF.
