= Vicente Engonga =

Spanish football player and manager

Personal information
- Full name: Vicente Engonga Maté
- Date of birth: 20 October 1965 (age 61)
- Place of birth: Barcelona, Spain
- Height: 1.81 m (5 ft 11 in)
- Position: Central midfielder

Youth career
- Gimnástica

Senior career*
Years	Team	Apps	(Gls)
1984–1986	Gimnástica	51	(2)
1986–1991	Sporting Mahonés	112	(3)
1991–1992	Valladolid	37	(2)
1992–1994	Celta	72	(0)
1994–1997	Valencia	69	(2)
1997–2002	Mallorca	149	(4)
2002–2003	Oviedo	11	(1)
2003	→ Coventry City (loan)	8	(0)
Total		509	(14)

International career
1998–2000	Spain	14	(1)
1997–2000	Cantabria	2	(0)

Managerial career
- 2008–2009: Equatorial Guinea
- 2011: Mallorca B
- * Club domestic league appearances and goals

Vicente Engonga Maté (born 20 October 1965) is a Spanish former professional footballer who played mainly as a central midfielder but occasionally as a sweeper.

He played for six clubs in his career, having his most successful spell at Mallorca after signing in 1997 aged 31. In total, he appeared in 327 La Liga matches and scored eight goals over 11 seasons.

Engonga was a Spanish international for two years, and represented the country at Euro 2000.

== Club career ==
Born in Barcelona, Catalonia of Equatorial Guinean descent, Engonga spent his childhood in the Cantabria region, where his father was a footballer. He started his senior career with local lower league side Gimnástica de Torrelavega, then joined CF Sporting Mahonés.

In 1991, Engonga moved to Real Valladolid in La Liga. The club was relegated to Segunda División and he left for RC Celta de Vigo, with whom he was a finalist in the 1994 Copa del Rey.

Engonga was bought by Valencia CF in summer 1994, spending three seasons at the Mestalla Stadium. After a shaky start, he made 35 appearances in 1996–97, although the Che finished tenth.

Subsequently, Engonga signed with RCD Mallorca who were coached by Héctor Cúper, along with five discarded teammates including Iván Campo. He displayed his best football at the Balearic Islands side, helping them win the 1998 Supercopa de España after beating FC Barcelona 3–1 on aggregate. Also that year, they reached the final of the UEFA Cup Winners' Cup, losing 2–1 to SS Lazio.

During the 2000–01 campaign, Engonga scored twice in 31 league games as his team finished third, qualifying for the UEFA Champions League for the first time. In their first match in the competition, he scored the only goal to defeat Arsenal at Son Moix, an 11th-minute penalty after Ashley Cole was sent off for fouling Albert Luque.

In 2002, Engonga's contract expired and he joined second-tier Real Oviedo where he played for six months before moving abroad in late January 2003, signing a six-month loan deal with English club Coventry City in the Football League Division One. At the end of the season the 37-year-old retired, going on to work with Mallorca in several coaching capacities.

== International career ==
On 23 September 1998, aged nearly 33, Engonga made his debut with Spain, playing the full 90 minutes in a 1–0 friendly win over Russia in Granada. He was the second-oldest player to debut for the country after Ferenc Puskás, who was 34 and had previously represented Hungary.

Engonga scored his only goal on 5 May 1999 in a friendly against Croatia, equalising an eventual 3–1 victory in Seville. He was picked for the UEFA Euro 2000 squad, making a late substitute appearance in a 2–1 group stage defeat of Slovenia at the Amsterdam Arena, which was the last of his 14 caps.

Engonga was the first Spanish-born black player to play for the national team. During his career, he also represented the unofficial Cantabria autonomous side.

In August 2008, Engonga was appointed manager of Equatorial Guinea.

== Personal life ==
Engonga's younger brother, Óscar, was also a professional midfielder. He played most of his career in the lower leagues of Spain, but was at Valladolid at the same time as Vicente.

Engonga's nephew, Igor, was selected by Equatorial Guinea for the 2015 Africa Cup of Nations.

== Career statistics ==
=== International ===
Appearances and goals by national team and year

National team	Year	Apps	Goals
Spain	1998	3	0
Spain	1999	5	0
Spain	2000	6	0
Spain	Total	14	1

Scores and results list Spain's goal tally first, score column indicates score after each Engonga goal.

List of international goals scored by Vicente Engonga
No.	Date	Venue	Opponent	Score	Result	Competition
1	5 May 1999	La Cartuja, Seville, Spain	Croatia	1–1	3–1	Friendly

== Honours ==
Celta

- Copa del Rey runner-up: 1993–94

Valencia

- Copa del Rey runner-up: 1994–95

Mallorca

- Supercopa de España: 1998
- Copa del Rey runner-up: 1997–98
- UEFA Cup Winners' Cup runner-up: 1998–99
