= Genís García Junyent =

Spanish footballer

Genís
Personal information
- Full name: Genís García Junyent
- Date of birth: 7 June 1975 (age 51)
- Place of birth: Sabadell, Spain
- Height: 1.84 m (6 ft 1/2 in)
- Position: Centre-back

Youth career
- 1981–1989: Mercantil
- 1989–1994: Barcelona

Senior career*
Years	Team	Apps	(Gls)
1994–1996	Barcelona C	16	(2)
1996–1997	Barcelona B	5	(0)
1997–2005	Sabadell	234	(11)
Total		255	(13)

International career
1991–1992	Spain U18	5	(0)
- * Club domestic league appearances and goals

Genís García Junyent (born 7 June 1975), known simply as Genís, is a Spanish former footballer. Mainly a central defender, he could also operate as a defensive midfielder.

== Club career ==
Born in Sabadell, Barcelona, Catalonia, Genís was a product of Barcelona's prolific youth ranks, La Masia. He could only play five matches for the reserves over the course of two Segunda División seasons, due to a severe knee injury.

Genís resumed his career in the Segunda División B with neighbouring club Sabadell, being an undisputed starter during most of his stay and eventually being named captain of the side. Due to constant physical ailments, now in the ankle, he was forced to retire in late 2005.

== Personal life ==
Genís' brothers, Óscar and Roger, were also footballers. All youth products of Barcelona, they had however different fates as professionals, as his siblings went on to have relatively successful careers in La Liga, including with Barça's first team.

On 17 June 1997, during the final of the Copa Catalunya, all three appeared with the full side in a 3–1 loss against Europa.
