= Quique Setién =

Spanish footballer & manager (born 1958)

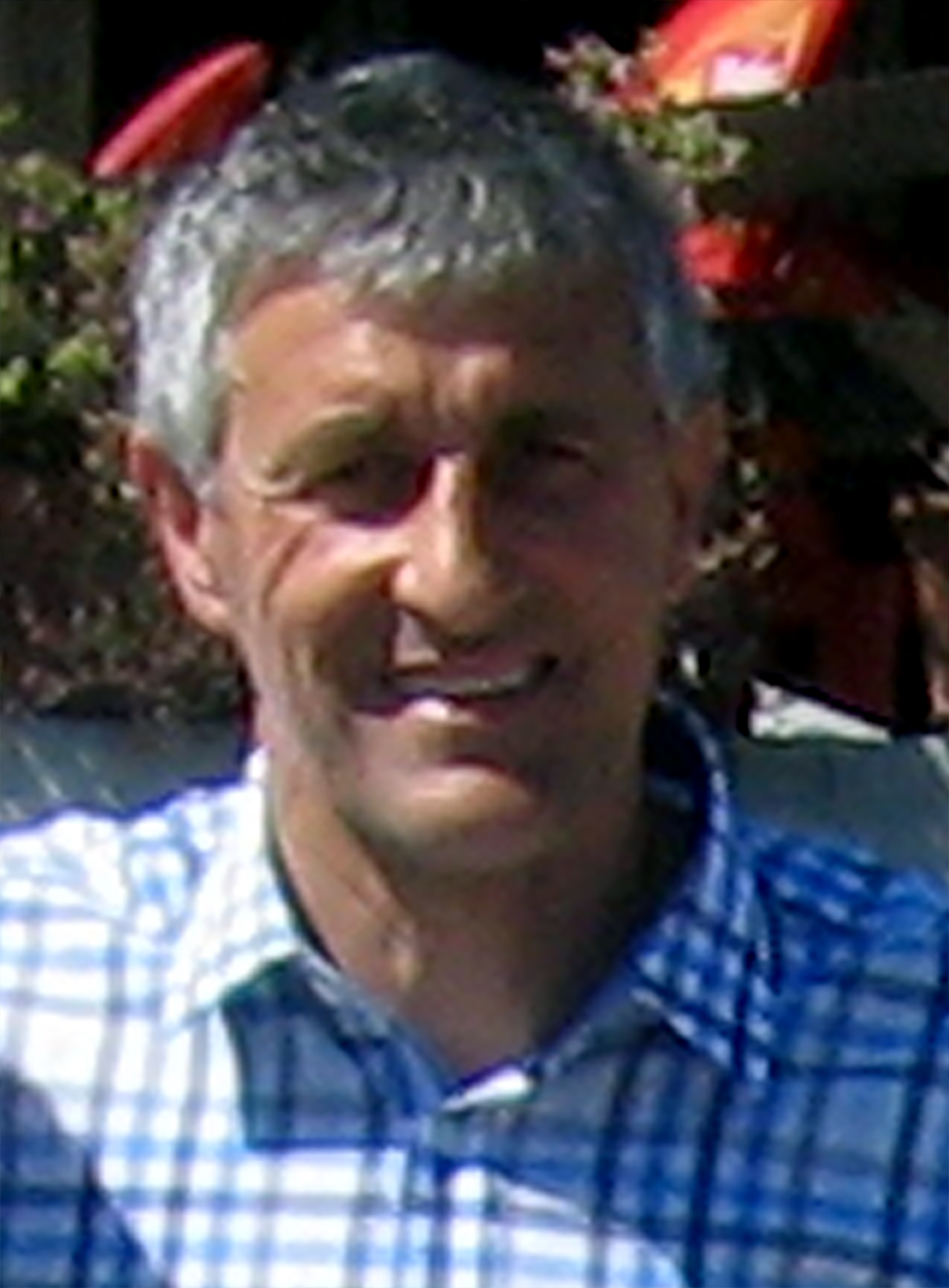
- Setién in 2010

Personal information
- Full name: Enrique Setién Solar
- Date of birth: 27 September 1958 (age 68)
- Place of birth: Santander, Spain
- Height: 1.82 m (6 ft 0 in)
- Position: Central midfielder

Youth career
- Casablanca
- Perines

Senior career*
| Years | Team | Apps | (Gls) |
| 1977–1985 | Racing Santander | 204 | (43) |
| 1985–1988 | Atlético Madrid | 73 | (7) |
| 1988–1992 | Logroñés | 114 | (20) |
| 1992–1996 | Racing Santander | 124 | (25) |
| 1996 | Levante | 3 | (0) |
| Total | | 518 | (95) |

International career
| 1978–1982 | Spain U21 | 2 | (0) |
| 1985–1986 | Spain | 3 | (0) |

Managerial career
- 2001–2002: Racing Santander
- 2003: Poli Ejido
- 2006: Equatorial Guinea
- 2007–2008: Logroñés
- 2009–2015: Lugo
- 2015–2017: Las Palmas
- 2017–2019: Betis
- 2020: Barcelona
- 2022–2023: Villarreal
- 2024–2025: Beijing Guoan
- * Club domestic league appearances and goals

Enrique "Quique" Setién Solar (Spanish pronunciation: [enˈrike seˈtjen soˈlaɾ]; born 27 September 1958) is a Spanish former professional footballer who played as a central midfielder. He is currently a manager.

As a player, he was nicknamed El Maestro, and was best known for his two spells with Racing de Santander, starting and finishing his 19-year professional career at the club. Over 15 seasons in La Liga, he played 374 matches and scored 58 goals. He also won three international caps for Spain.

Setién started a managerial career in 2001, going on to coach several teams including Racing. Starting in January 2020, he was in charge of Barcelona for seven months, being dismissed following an 8–2 loss against Bayern Munich in the UEFA Champions League.

== Club career ==
Born in Santander, Setién made his La Liga debut in 1977, with his hometown club Racing de Santander. During his first spell with the Cantabrians, although he played regularly, he was not yet a regular starter, and he missed the entire 1982–83 season as well as being relegated twice.

Afterwards, Setién represented Atlético Madrid for three years. He enjoyed a good first two seasons, but appeared rarely in his last after some spats with elusive club chairman Jesús Gil.

Setién then moved to Logroñés in 1988 where, after a slow start, he was essential in helping the Riojans retain their top-tier status. The 34-year-old returned to Racing in 1992, and scored a career-best 11 goals in the first year in his second spell as the side returned to the top flight. He played three more years with the latter, and retired in June 1996 at nearly 38 after featuring for Levante in the Segunda División B play-offs, which also ended in promotion.

In 2001, Setién was voted by Racing's fans as their best player of all time. He appeared in almost 600 official matches in nearly two decades of play, totalling 95 league goals.

== International career ==
Setién appeared three times for Spain and was selected for the 1986 FIFA World Cup squad, but did not leave the bench during the tournament in Mexico. His debut came on 20 November 1985 in a 0–0 friendly with Austria, in Zaragoza.

== Coaching career ==
=== Early career ===
Setién began working as a manager on 5 October 2001, succeeding the dismissed Gustavo Benítez at a Racing side that had started poorly following relegation to Segunda División. He took the team from 17th to promotion as runners-up to Atlético, but left at the end of the season due to pressure and handed the reins to his former teammate Manuel Preciado.

For the 2003–04 campaign, Setién returned to the second division with Polideportivo Ejido. He was dismissed on 17 November, with the team in the relegation zone.

In 2005, Setién was appointed assistant coach to the Russia national beach soccer team. For three months during the following year, he was in charge of Equatorial Guinea. After that he moved to another team he played for, Logroñes in division three, being relieved of his duties midway through the 2007–08 campaign.

=== Lugo ===
In June 2009, Setién became Lugo's coach. He led the side to promotion to the second tier in his third year, a second-ever for the Galicians.

In the following three years, they managed to stay afloat, ranking between positions 11th and 15th.

=== Las Palmas ===
On 19 October 2015, following the dismissal of Paco Herrera, Setién became the new manager of Las Palmas in the top flight. He arrived with them in the relegation zone, and led them to 11th place in his first season.

On 18 March 2017, Setién announced that he would leave the Canary Islands club at the end of the campaign due to disputes with the board.

=== Betis ===
On 26 May 2017, Setién was appointed manager of Real Betis on a three-year deal. He led the team to the sixth place in his first year, with the subsequent qualification for the group stage of the UEFA Europa League.

Setién was linked with a move to Barcelona in January 2019, but it did not materialise. On 19 May, he announced that he would leave the Estadio Benito Villamarín.

=== Barcelona ===
Setién signed as head coach of Barcelona on 13 January 2020, replacing the dismissed Ernesto Valverde on a contract lasting to June 2022. In his first match in charge, six days later, he managed a 1–0 home victory over Granada.

The team eventually finished the domestic league in second position, behind Real Madrid. On 14 August 2020, they lost 8–2 to Bayern Munich in the quarter-finals of the UEFA Champions League, which was the first time in 74 years that the club had conceded eight goals in a game; it was also the first loss by a six-goal margin since 1951. He was officially dismissed three days later, subsequently confirming he would take legal action, as he felt the terms of his contract were not respected.

=== Villarreal ===
Setién returned to management on 25 October 2022, replacing Aston Villa-bound Unai Emery at the helm of Villarreal. He led the side to fifth place, thus qualifying for the Europa League.

On 5 September 2023, Setién was dismissed due to poor results.

=== Beijing Guoan ===
On 10 December 2024, Setién was appointed at Beijing Guoan of the Chinese Super League. He won Manager of the Month accolades in May and June 2025, but his team's form declined towards the end of his spell, notably losing 6–0 at Shandong Taishan which was an all-time worst for the club. He oversaw 32 matches with 17 wins, nine draws and six defeats, and on 5 October resigned for personal reasons, thanking the entire organisation through a farewell message.

== Personal life ==
Setién's son, Laro, is also a footballer and a midfielder. His father-in-law José Antonio Lozano played in the Spanish second tier in the early 1960s, and all three relatives represented Racing Santander. In addition to his native Spanish, he also speaks English and Italian.

Setién is a keen chess player with a FIDE rating of 1965. He played matches against former world champions Garry Kasparov and Anatoly Karpov, the results of which were not made public. He mentioned the game as an influence on his football tactics, which prioritised possession and midfield domination.

Before being Barcelona manager, Setién lived in Liencres, 9 km west of Santander, where there are a lot of cows; hence, he commented: "Yesterday I was walking past cows in my home town; today I was at Barcelona's training ground coaching the best players in the world, an enormous club". In April 2020, in an interview with TV3, he talked about winning La Liga and Champions League titles, when he said: "If it can be both, better. And of course I have dreamed of walking around Liencres with the cows while holding up the Champions League trophy and showing it to them."

== Managerial statistics ==
As of match played 2 October 2025

Managerial record by team and tenure
| Team | Nat | From | To | Record | | | | | | | | Ref |
| Team | Nat | From | To | G | W | D | L | GF | GA | GD | Win % | Ref |
|---|---|---|---|---|---|---|---|---|---|---|---|---|
| Racing Santander | (Spain) | 4 October 2001 | 19 June 2002 | 36 | 18 | 10 | 8 | 55 | 32 | +23 | 50.00 | |
| Poli Ejido | (Spain) | 1 July 2003 | 17 November 2003 | 13 | 2 | 4 | 7 | 13 | 22 | −9 | 15.38 | |
| Equatorial Guinea | (Equatorial Guinea) | 1 October 2006 | 31 December 2006 | 1 | 0 | 0 | 1 | 0 | 3 | −3 | 0.00 | |
| Logroñés | (Spain) | 30 May 2007 | 15 January 2008 | 20 | 5 | 6 | 9 | 25 | 33 | −8 | 25.00 | |
| Lugo | (Spain) | 10 June 2009 | 8 June 2015 | 258 | 97 | 83 | 78 | 317 | 295 | +22 | 37.60 | |
| Las Palmas | (Spain) | 19 October 2015 | 26 May 2017 | 78 | 26 | 18 | 34 | 109 | 129 | −20 | 33.33 | |
| Betis | (Spain) | 26 May 2017 | 19 May 2019 | 94 | 39 | 22 | 33 | 133 | 134 | −1 | 41.49 | |
| Barcelona | (Spain) | 13 January 2020 | 17 August 2020 | 25 | 16 | 4 | 5 | 50 | 27 | +23 | 64.00 | |
| Villarreal | (Spain) | 25 October 2022 | 5 September 2023 | 39 | 18 | 6 | 15 | 72 | 54 | +18 | 46.15 | |
| Beijing Guoan | (China) | 10 December 2024 | 5 October 2025 | 32 | 17 | 9 | 6 | 74 | 47 | +27 | 53.13 | |
| Total | | | | 595 | 238 | 162 | 195 | 848 | 776 | +72 | 40.00 | — |

== Honours ==
=== Player ===
Atlético Madrid

- Supercopa de España: 1985
- UEFA Cup Winners' Cup runner-up: 1985–86

=== Manager ===
Individual

- Chinese Super League Manager of the Month: May 2025, June 2025
