= Fernando Sanz =

Spanish former footballer (born 1974)

Personal information
- Full name: Fernando Sanz Durán
- Date of birth: 4 January 1974 (age 52)
- Place of birth: Madrid, Spain
- Height: 1.83 m (6 ft 0 in)
- Position: Centre-back

Youth career
- Real Madrid

Senior career*
Years	Team	Apps	(Gls)
1993–1994	Real Madrid C	22	(0)
1994–1996	Real Madrid B	47	(0)
1993	→ Unión Española (loan)	20	(0)
1996–1999	Real Madrid	35	(0)
1999–2006	Málaga	205	(5)
Total		329	(5)

International career
1990–1991	Spain U17	2	(0)
1991	Spain U18	1	(0)
- * Club domestic league appearances and goals

Fernando Sanz Durán (born 4 January 1974) is a Spanish former footballer who played as a central defender.

He spent seven years of his professional career with Málaga – after starting out at Real Madrid – appearing in 228 official games. Subsequently, he worked for four years as the club's president.

== Club career ==
=== Real Madrid ===
Born in Madrid, Sanz was a product of Real Madrid's youth system and, after a quick loan stint with Unión Española in Chile, first appeared with the main squad on 2 March 1996, playing nine minutes of a 5–0 home win against UD Salamanca (José García Calvo, another centre back from the academy, also played his first La Liga game that day). He finished the season with 13 appearances, playing a further six matches in the following as the team were crowned league champions.

Sanz was also part of their UEFA Champions League victory in 1997–98. However, despite being the son of Lorenzo Sanz, the president of the club at the time, he never really managed to hold up a regular first team spot at Real.

=== Málaga ===
For the start of 1999–2000, Sanz signed with Málaga CF. On 8 September 2001 he scored his first goal as a professional, in a 1–1 draw at his former employers. That season, the Andalusia side finished tenth and he helped it win the subsequent Intertoto Cup, which eventually led to a UEFA Cup quarter-final run, with the player appearing in eight complete games.

Sanz retired from football in 2006 after Málaga's relegation, with 240 matches and five goals in the top level to his credit, immediately becoming its president after his father bought 97% of the shares. After four years, he resigned on 27 July 2010 as the club was sold earlier in the summer to a Qatari investor.

== Personal life ==
Sanz was the brother-in-law of another Real Madrid player, Míchel Salgado – the two were never teammates, as Salgado arrived the year Sanz left the club – who married his sister Malula.

His older brother Francisco and his nephew, also named Francisco, were also footballers.

== Honours ==
Real Madrid

- La Liga: 1996–97
- UEFA Champions League: 1997–98
- Intercontinental Cup: 1998

Málaga

- UEFA Intertoto Cup: 2002
