= Jon Bakero (footballer, born 1996) =

Spanish footballer (born 1996)

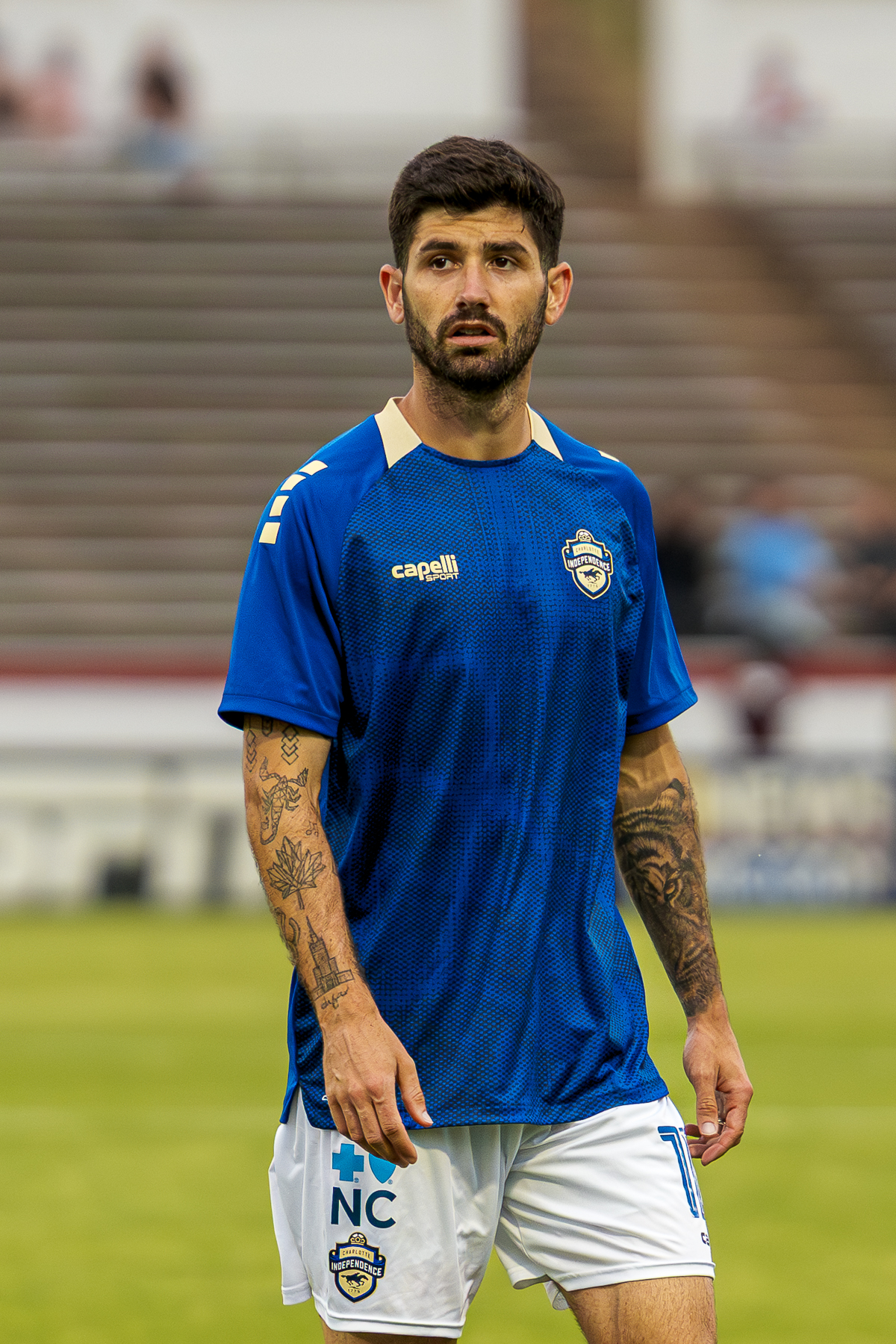
- Bakwro with Charlotte Independence in 2026

Personal information
- Full name: Jon Bakero González
- Date of birth: 5 November 1996 (age 30)
- Place of birth: Sitges, Spain
- Height: 1.88 m (6 ft 2 in)
- Positions: Attacking midfielder; second striker

Team information
- Current team: Charlotte Independence
- Number: 10

Youth career
- 2009–2010: La Blanca Subur
- 2010–2011: Agrykola Warszawa
- 2011: Lech Poznań
- 2012: MSP Szamotuły
- 2012–2014: La Blanca Subur

College career
| Years | Team | Apps | (Gls) |
| 2014–2017 | Wake Forest Demon Deacons | 88 | (37) |

Senior career*
| Years | Team | Apps | (Gls) |
| 2016 | FC Tucson | 8 | (1) |
| 2017 | Carolina Dynamo | 7 | (5) |
| 2018 | Chicago Fire | 4 | (0) |
| 2018 | → Tulsa Roughnecks (loan) | 3 | (2) |
| 2018–2019 | Toronto FC | 3 | (0) |
| 2018 | → Toronto FC II (loan) | 5 | (1) |
| 2019 | → Phoenix Rising (loan) | 24 | (3) |
| 2020–2021 | Phoenix Rising | 42 | (5) |
| 2022 | Slavia Sofia | 17 | (5) |
| 2022–2023 | Pontevedra | 25 | (0) |
| 2023 | Slavia Sofia | 8 | (0) |
| 2024 | Lleida Esportiu | 16 | (3) |
| 2024 | Memphis 901 | 11 | (1) |
| 2025– | Charlotte Independence | 59 | (11) |
- * Club domestic league appearances and goals as of October 28, 2026

Jon Bakero González (born 5 November 1996) is a Spanish footballer who plays as an attacking midfielder for Charlotte Independence in the USL League One. In 2017, Bakero won the MAC Hermann Trophy, an annual award given to the top college soccer player in the United States.

== Career ==
=== Youth and college ===
Bakero played college soccer for Wake Forest in the Atlantic Coast Conference, where he was a regular starter all four years. In total, Bakero made 88 appearances for the Demon Deacons, scoring 37 goals across all competitive matches. Bakero made his debut for Wake Forest on 29 August 2014 in a 3–1 loss against UCLA. A month later, he would earn his first points with Wake Forest, notching an assist against Akron on 30 September 2014, in a 2–1 victory. In the following match, on 3 October 2014, Bakero scored his first collegiate goal against Duke in a 4–1 victory. Bakero would score multiple times two weeks later.

During his sophomore year, Bakero improved on his freshman campaign and scored eight season goals, and would go on to earn Third Team All-ACC recognition. Between his sophomore and junior years, Bakero played for FC Tucson in the Premier Development League, an off-season amateur league that allows college soccer players to retain their NCAA eligibility while still playing competitively during the offseason. Bakero finished the 2016 PDL season with one goal in eight appearances for Tucson.

In his junior year, Bakero played an integral part of the 2016 Wake Forest team that earned their first ACC Men's Soccer Championship since 1989, and their first berth in the NCAA College Cup Final since 2007. Bakero earned All-ACC Tournament XI honors and College Cup Best XI honors. In between his junior and senior years, Bakero returned to the PDL where he scored five times in seven appearances for the Carolina Dynamo.

Bakero lead the Deacs in scoring for his senior year, where he notched 16 goals in 23 appearances. He helped Wake Forest successfully defend their ACC Tournament title, and reach the quarterfinals of the NCAA Tournament. He was awarded with First-Team All ACC honors, the ACC Men's Soccer Offensive Player of the Year and the Hermann Trophy, which is given annually by the Missouri Athletic Club to the best college soccer player in the United States.

=== Professional ===
Ahead of the 2018 Major League Soccer season, it was announced that Bakero had signed a contract with Major League Soccer, making him eligible for the 2018 MLS SuperDraft. He was an expected first round draft pick. Bakero was selected by Chicago Fire SC with the fifth overall pick in the SuperDraft. Bakero made his professional debut on 14 April 2018 as an 85th minute substitution in a 1–0 loss to the LA Galaxy.

On 20 July 2018, Bakero was traded by Chicago Fire to Toronto FC along with $50,000 in General Allocation Money in exchange for Nicolas Hasler. He made his TFC debut in their 3–2 loss to NYCFC on 11 August. In 2019, he was loaned to Phoenix Rising FC After the season, he signed a permanent contract with Phoenix Rising.

On 6 January 2022, Bakero joined Bulgarian First League club Slavia Sofia.

In the summer of 2022, he returned to Spain and joined Pontevedra CF in the Primera Federación. In June 2023, he agreed to terminate his contract with the club by mutual consent.

He then subsequently returned to Slavia Sofia, with his father being named head coach. In September 2023, he terminated his contract with the club by mutual consent, shortly after his father was replaced as coach by the club.

=== Lleida Esportiu ===
On 2 January 2024, Bakero returned to Spain and signed as a free agent with Segunda Federación club Lleida Esportiu for the remainder of the 2023–24 season. He made his club debut on 7 January 2024 and scored his first goal on 28 January in a 3–1 home victory against UD Alzira.

Bakero scored twice more during the regular campaign, netting in a 3–0 home win over SD Formentera on 17 March and in a 2–1 away loss against Hércules CF on 5 May. He finished his spell with 16 regular-season league appearances (three goals) and two appearances in the promotion play-offs, totaling 18 competitive appearances and three goals before departing the club in July 2024.

=== Memphis 901 ===
On July 25, 2024, Bakero returned to the USL Championship, signing a 25-day short-term contract with Memphis 901 FC that was later extended through the remainder of the season. He made 11 regular-season appearances (seven starts) for the club, scoring his lone goal in the second minute of the October 26 regular-season finale—a victory over Western Conference leaders New Mexico United. Bakero also featured in Memphis's 2024 playoff appearance before becoming a free agent when the club ceased operations following the season.

=== Charlotte Independence ===
Jon Bakero signed with USL League One side Charlotte Independence on February 4, 2025, recording his first competitive goal for the club on April 15, 2025, against North Carolina FC.

During his standout 2026 campaign, Bakero set single-season and career assist records, won the USL League One Player of the Year award, and helped lead Charlotte to the 2026 USL League One title.

== Personal life ==
Bakero is the son of former professional footballer, José Mari Bakero, who played for the Spain national team, Real Sociedad and FC Barcelona. His aunt is Itziar Bakero, a former female professional footballer, and his uncles Santiago and Jon Bakero were also footballers.

== Career statistics ==
As of 14 November 2026

Appearances and goals by club, season and competition
| Club | Season | League | | | League Playoffs | | Domestic Cup (Note: Includes U.S. Open Cup, Bulgarian Cup, Copa del Rey, and USL Jägermeister Cup) | | Continental | | Total | |
| Club | Season | Division | Apps | Goals | Apps | Goals | Apps | Goals | Apps | Goals | Apps | Goals |
|---|---|---|---|---|---|---|---|---|---|---|---|---|
| FC Tucson | 2016 | Premier Development League | 8 | 1 | 0 | 0 | 2 | 0 | — | — | 10 | 1 |
| Carolina Dynamo | 2017 | Premier Development League | 7 | 5 | — | — | 0 | 0 | — | — | 7 | 5 |
| Chicago Fire | 2018 | Major League Soccer | 4 | 0 | — | — | 0 | 0 | — | — | 4 | 0 |
| Tulsa Roughnecks (loan) | 2018 | USL | 3 | 2 | — | — | 0 | 0 | — | — | 3 | 2 |
| Toronto FC | 2018 | Major League Soccer | 3 | 0 | — | — | 0 | 0 | 0 | 0 | 3 | 0 |
| Toronto FC II (loan) | 2018 | USL | 5 | 1 | — | — | — | — | — | — | 5 | 1 |
| Phoenix Rising (loan) | 2019 | USL Championship | 24 | 3 | 1 | 0 | 1 | 0 | — | — | 26 | 3 |
| Phoenix Rising | 2020 | USL Championship | 16 | 2 | 3 | 0 | — | — | — | — | 19 | 2 |
| Phoenix Rising | 2021 | USL Championship | 26 | 3 | 1 | 0 | — | — | — | — | 27 | 3 |
| Phoenix Rising | Total | | 66 | 8 | 5 | 0 | 1 | 0 | — | — | 72 | 8 |
| Slavia Sofia | 2021–22 | Bulgarian First League | 17 | 5 | — | — | 3 | 0 | — | — | 20 | 5 |
| Pontevedra | 2022–23 | Primera Federación | 25 | 0 | — | — | 3 | 0 | — | — | 28 | 0 |
| Slavia Sofia | 2023–24 | Bulgarian First League | 8 | 0 | — | — | 0 | 0 | — | — | 8 | 0 |
| Lleida Esportiu | 2023–24 | Segunda Federación | 16 | 3 | 2 | 0 | 0 | 0 | — | — | 18 | 3 |
| Memphis 901 | 2024 | USL Championship | 11 | 1 | 1 | 0 | 0 | 0 | — | — | 12 | 1 |
| Charlotte Independence | 2025 | USL League One | 29 | 3 | 1 | 0 | 4 | 2 | — | — | 34 | 5 |
| Charlotte Independence | 2026 | USL League One | 30 | 8 | 3 | 1 | 7 | 0 | — | — | 40 | 9 |
| Charlotte Independence | Total | | 59 | 11 | 4 | 1 | 11 | 2 | — | — | 74 | 14 |
| Career total | | | 232 | 37 | 12 | 1 | 20 | 2 | 0 | 0 | 264 | 40 |

== Honors ==
=== College ===
- Hermann Trophy: 2017
- ACC Men's Soccer Offensive Player of the Year: 2017
- Senior CLASS Award: 2017
- 2017 First-Team All American (CSN, Soccer America, United Soccer Coaches)
- Hermann Trophy: 2017
- Senior CLASS Award: 2017
- ACC Offensive Player of the Year: 2017
- United Soccer Coaches First-Team All-American: 2017
- First-Team All-ACC: 2017
- NCAA College Cup Best XI: 2016

=== Professional ===
- USL League One Player of the Year: 2026
- USL League One Golden Playmaker: 2026
- USL League One All-League First Team: 2026

=== Club ===
- Wake Forest
  - ACC Men's Soccer Tournament: 2016, 2017
- Phoenix Rising
  - USL Championship regular season: 2019
- Charlotte Independence
  - USL League One Players' Shield: 2026
  - USL League One: 2026
