= Julio Gento =

Spanish footballer

Personal information
- Full name: Julio Gento López
- Date of birth: 24 April 1939
- Place of birth: Guarnizo, Spain
- Date of death: 14 September 2016 (aged 77)
- Height: 1.66 m (5 ft 5 in)
- Position: Forward

Senior career*
Years	Team	Apps	(Gls)
1957–1960	Plus Ultra	69	(23)
1960–1961	Elche	11	(4)
1961–1962	Deportivo La Coruña	17	(4)
1962–1963	CD Málaga	10	(0)
1963–1968	Racing Santander	122	(15)
1969–1976	Palencia		
Total		229	(46)
- * Club domestic league appearances and goals

Julio Gento López (24 April 1939 – 14 September 2016) was a Spanish professional footballer who played as a forward.

== Career ==
Born in Guarnizo, Gento played for Plus Ultra, Elche, Deportivo La Coruña, CD Málaga, Racing Santander and Palencia.

== Personal life ==
His brothers Paco Gento and Antonio Gento were also footballers. His nephews were also athletes – José Luis Llorente and Toñín Llorente played basketball, whilst Paco Llorente and Julio Llorente were footballers. Grand-nephew Marcos Llorente, son of Paco Llorente, was also a footballer.
