= Goizueta, Navarre =

Municipality in Navarre, Spain

Goizueta
- Municipality
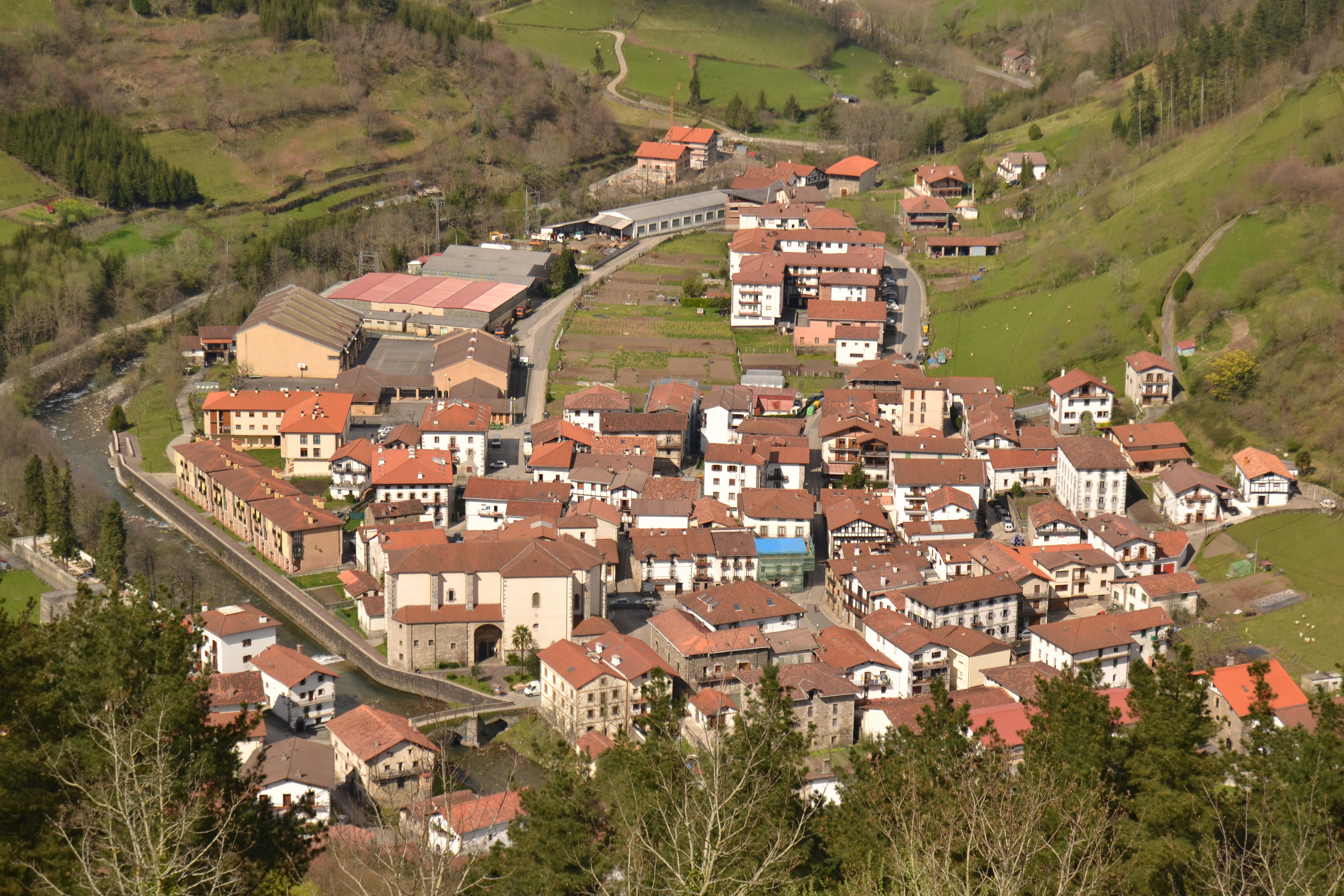
- Aerial view of Goizueta

- Coat of arms

- Location within Navarre Location within Spain
- Coordinates: 43°10′16″N 1°51′51″W
- Country: Spain
- Autonomous community: Navarre
- Province: Navarre
- Eskualdea / Comarca: Leitzaldea / Norte de Aralar

Government
  - Mayor: Unai Miranda Berroeta (EH Bildu)

Area
  - Total: 91.36 km^{2} (35.27 sq mi)
- Elevation: 155 m (509 ft)

Population (2025-01-01)
  - Total: 681
  - Density: 7.45/km^{2} (19.3/sq mi)
- Demonym: Goizuetarra
- Time zone: UTC+1 (CET)
  - Summer (DST): UTC+2 (CEST)
- Postal code: 31754
- Dialing code: + 34 948
- Website: goizueta.eus

Goizueta is a town and municipality located in the province and autonomous community of Navarre, northern Spain.

== History ==
The Spanish conquest of Iberian Navarre started in 1512 with a Guipuzkoan militia capturing it on 10 July 1512.
