= Laro Setién =

Spanish footballer (born 1995)

Personal information
- Full name: Laro Gabriel Setién Lozano
- Date of birth: 8 April 1995 (age 31)
- Place of birth: Santander, Spain
- Height: 1.83 m (6 ft 0 in)
- Position: Midfielder

Team information
- Current team: Formentera

Youth career
- 2011–2014: Lugo

Senior career*
Years	Team	Apps	(Gls)
2013	Lugo	0	(0)
2014–2016	Racing B	60	(10)
2016–2017	Racing Santander	8	(0)
2017	Racing Ferrol	11	(3)
2017–2018	Córdoba B	24	(3)
2018–2019	Escobedo	32	(10)
2019–2020	Sant Andreu	18	(3)
2020–	Formentera	0	(0)
- * Club domestic league appearances and goals as of 18 July 2020

Laro Gabriel Setién Lozano (born 8 April 1995) is a Spanish footballer who plays for SD Formentera as a midfielder.

== Club career ==
Born in Santander, Cantabria, Laro was a youth product of CD Lugo. He made his official debut for the Galicians' main squad on 16 October 2013, while still a junior, replacing Víctor Marco in a 0–1 away loss against Recreativo de Huelva for the season's Copa del Rey.

On 6 August 2014 Laro went on a trial at Burgos CF. However, nothing came of it and he moved to Racing de Santander late in the month, being assigned to the reserves in Tercera División.

Laro scored his first goal for Racing B on 29 August 2014, netting the third of a 4–0 away routing over CD Bezana. In September 2016, he was promoted to the first team in Segunda División B.

On 30 December 2016, Laro moved to fellow league team Racing de Ferrol after cutting ties with the Verdiblancos. The following 27 May, he joined Córdoba CF B still in the third division.

Setién spent the next few years in the fourth tier, with UM Escobedo, UE Sant Andreu and SD Formentera.

== Personal life ==
Laro's father, Quique Setién, was also a footballer and a midfielder, and later a manager of clubs including FC Barcelona. His grandfather José Antonio Lozano was also a footballer, and all of them represented Racing.
