= Paco Sanz (footballer, born 1972) =

Spanish footballer

Personal information
- Full name: Francisco Sanz Durán
- Date of birth: 29 November 1972 (age 53)
- Place of birth: Madrid, Spain
- Height: 1.83 m (6 ft 0 in)
- Position: Midfielder

Youth career
- 1984–1991: Real Madrid

Senior career*
Years	Team	Apps	(Gls)
1993–1995	Real Madrid B	41	(1)
1993	→ Unión Española (loan)		
1995–1996	Oviedo	7	(0)
1996–1997	Racing Santander	0	(0)
1997–2000	Mallorca	1	(0)
Total		49	(1)
- * Club domestic league appearances and goals

Francisco Sanz Durán (born 29 November 1972) is a Spanish former professional footballer who played as a midfielder.

== Career ==
Born in Madrid, Sanz played youth football with Real Madrid. A brief loan in Chile with Unión Española notwithstanding, he spent his first seasons as a senior with Real's reserves, making his Segunda División debut on 4 September 1993 in a 3–1 home win against Hércules CF where he came on as a late substitute and scoring his only goal on 2 October in another home fixture that concluded with the same result, against CA Marbella.

In the summer of 1995, Sanz signed with La Liga club Real Oviedo. He played his first match in the competition on 3 September, featuring 77 minutes in the 1–0 loss at Real Zaragoza.

From there onwards, Sanz could hardly ever get a game at his next teams, Racing de Santander and RCD Mallorca. Consequently, he retired at the age of 27, later referring to himself in an interview conducted by daily newspaper El País as a "bad player".

== Later life ==
After retiring, Sanz worked in the hospitality industry in Madrid. Previous to that, he was the president of Granada CF.

In July 2009, Sanz was ordered by a court of law to pay €229 for assaulting Carlos Tomás Romero in April, when both worked in directorial capacities at Granada.

== Personal life ==
Sanz's younger brother, Fernando, was also a footballer. Both were sons of Lorenzo Sanz, president of Real Madrid in the late 90s.

Sanz's son, also named Francisco, was also involved in the sport as a centre-back. On 26 March 2020, shortly after his father had died due to coronavirus, the former was admitted to the Vithas Nisa Pardo de Aravaca Hospital in Madrid after testing positive.
