= Marv Grissom =

American baseball player and coach (1918–2005)

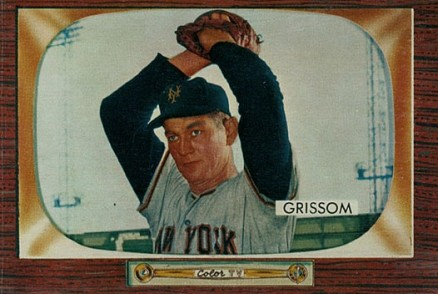
- Pitcher
- Born: March 31, 1918; Los Molinos, California, U.S.
- Died: September 19, 2005 (aged 87); Red Bluff, California, U.S.
- Batted: Right Threw: Right

MLB debut
- September 10, 1946, for the New York Giants

Last MLB appearance
- June 11, 1959, for the St. Louis Cardinals

MLB statistics
- Win–loss record: 47–45
- Earned run average: 3.41
- Strikeouts: 459
- Saves: 57
- Stats at Baseball Reference

Teams
- New York Giants (1946); Detroit Tigers (1949); Chicago White Sox (1952); Boston Red Sox (1953); New York / San Francisco Giants (1953–1958); St. Louis Cardinals (1959)

Career highlights and awards
- All-Star (1954); World Series champion (1954)

Marvin Edward Grissom (March 31, 1918 – September 19, 2005) was an American professional baseball pitcher and pitching coach. During his active career he appeared in 356 games in Major League Baseball for the New York / San Francisco Giants (1946; 1953–58), Detroit Tigers (1949), Chicago White Sox (1952), Boston Red Sox (1953) and St. Louis Cardinals (1959). Born in Los Molinos, California, he threw and batted right-handed, stood 6 feet 3 inches (1.91 m) tall and weighed 190 pounds (86 kg). An elder brother, Lee, was a left-handed pitcher for four MLB teams between 1934 and 1941; in addition, a nephew, Jim Davis, also a southpaw, pitched for three National League clubs in the mid-1950s and was Marv Grissom's teammate with the 1957 New York Giants.

== Early playing career ==
Grissom's pro career began in 1941. He signed with the Hollywood Stars of the Triple-A Pacific Coast League and spent 1941 with a Stars' Class C California League farm club. He missed the next four seasons (1942–45) while he served in the United States Navy during World War II. Grissom never appeared in a Hollywood uniform; they released him in 1946 and he resumed his career in the Giants' organization. After he appeared in 34 games for Triple-A Jersey City in 1946, the Giants called him up in September. As a rookie, Grissom made three starts in four games, dropped each of his two decisions, then spent all of 1947–48 back in the minor leagues. The Tigers selected him in the 1948 Rule 5 draft, and he spent all of 1949 on the Detroit roster, working in 27 games (all but two as a relief pitcher), and posting a poor 2–4 record and 6.41 earned run average. Two more years at Triple-A followed; during the second, 1951, Grissom won 20 games for the Seattle Rainiers. Then, during the 1951–52 offseason, he was acquired by the White Sox.

In 1952, at age 34, Grissom finally established himself as a Major League pitcher, going 12–10 (3.74) in 28 games (24 as a starter) and 166 innings pitched, with seven complete games and one shutout. The following February, he was one of three ChiSox hurlers swapped to the pitching-poor Red Sox for veteran shortstop Vern Stephens. But after a promising start to his 1953 campaign, Grissom's Red Sox career unraveled when he allowed 12 hits and 12 earned runs in only 2 1/3 innings over two outings against the Cleveland Indians at Fenway Park on June 24–25. His ERA ballooned from 3.05 to 4.78, and after only one more appearance, Grissom was placed on waivers. He was claimed by the Giants on July 1. He got into 21 games for them, with seven starts and three complete games. He also began to pitch out of the bullpen for manager Leo Durocher, although he recorded no saves that year.

== Stalwart relief pitcher ==
But in 1954, Grissom found his niche as one of Durocher's ace relief pitchers — Hall of Famer Hoyt Wilhelm was the other — as he helped the Giants win the National League pennant. He led the club in saves (17, third in the league) and won ten other games, nine in relief. Grissom was named to the National League All-Star team and finished 24th in voting for NL MVP Award. In 122 1/3 innings pitched, he had 64 strikeouts and a 2.35 earned run average. Then, in the 1954 World Series against the Indians, Grissom was the winning pitcher in Game 1, the contest marked by Willie Mays' classic, over-the-shoulder catch of Vic Wertz' long drive to center field. Grissom came into the game in relief of Don Liddle in the eighth inning, immediately after Mays' catch, with the game tied, 2–2. He proceeded to pitch 22/3 innings of one-hit ball, and held Cleveland off the scoreboard until pinch hitter Dusty Rhodes won the game with a three-run, walk-off home run in the tenth inning. It was Grissom's only appearance in the Series, as the Giants swept Cleveland in four straight games.

Grissom also shone as a relief pitcher for the next four seasons, leading the Giants in saves three more times (1955; 1957–58). He was a member of the last Giants' team to represent New York City, and the first one based in San Francisco. Traded to the Cardinals in October 1958, he was able to appear in only three games for the 1959 Redbirds before a back injury forced his retirement as an active player at the age of 41. In ten MLB seasons, Grissom had a 47–45 record, 356 games (52 started), 12 complete games, three shutouts, 58 saves, and a career 3.41 ERA. He allowed 771 hits and 343 bases on balls in 810 total innings pitched, with 459 strikeouts.

== Pitching coach ==
After his playing career, Grissom had a 15-year-long tenure as a pitching coach for four MLB teams: the Los Angeles/California Angels (during three separate terms: 1961–66; 1969; 1977–78), White Sox (1967–68), Minnesota Twins (1970–71) and Chicago Cubs (1975–76). He also spent time with the San Francisco Giants. Alvin Dark recalled that while Grissom was with the Giants, he had a rule that if Hank Aaron was batting, the pitcher should throw a brushback pitch to try to move him off the plate.

Grissom died in Red Bluff, California, at the age of 87.

Sporting positions
Preceded by Franchise created Bob Lemon; Billy Muffett	Los Angeles/California Angels pitching coach 1961–1966; 1969; 1977–1978	Succeeded by Bob Lemon n/a Larry Sherry
Preceded by Ray Berres	Chicago White Sox pitching coach 1967–1968	Succeeded by Ray Berres
Preceded by Art Fowler	Minnesota Twins pitching coach 1970–1971	Succeeded by Al Worthington
Preceded by Hank Aguirre	Chicago Cubs pitching coach 1975–1976	Succeeded by Barney Schultz
