= World Series Most Valuable Player Award =

Major League Baseball award

Willie Mays World Series Most Valuable Player Award
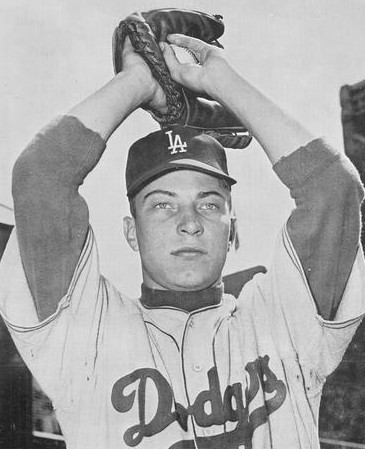
- Johnny Podres was the inaugural World Series MVP Award winner, for the 1955 Brooklyn Dodgers
- Sport: Baseball
- League: Major League Baseball
- Awarded for: Annual most valuable player of the World Series
- Country: United States; Canada
- Presented by: Major League Baseball (since 1985)

History
- First award: 1955
- Most recent: William Contreras (Milwaukee Brewers)

The Willie Mays World Series Most Valuable Player (MVP) Award is given to the Major League Baseball (MLB) player deemed to have the most impact on his team's performance in the World Series, which is the final round of the MLB postseason. The award was first presented in 1955 by Sport magazine, but since 1985 has been officially presented by MLB. The winner is determined during the final game of the World Series by a committee of reporters and officials present at the game.

On September 29, 2017, the award was renamed in honor of Willie Mays in remembrance of the 63rd anniversary of The Catch, which occurred the year before the award's debut; Mays never won the award himself.

== Car and trophy ==
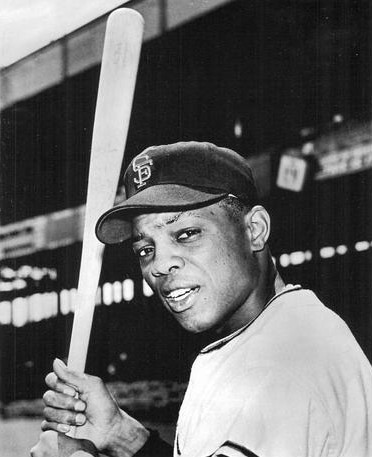
Willie Mays, namesake of the award since 2017; he himself never won the honor.

The award winner has traditionally received a new car. Johnny Podres, the inaugural winner in 1955, received a Chevrolet Corvette. The 1977 winner, Reggie Jackson, received a Ford Thunderbird, while the 1983 winner, Rick Dempsey, received a Pontiac Firebird. Frank Viola, the 1987 MVP, received a Volvo 740.

Since 2004, General Motors had provided the vehicle. Examples include David Ortiz (2013 MVP) receiving a 2014 Chevrolet Silverado High Country, Ben Zobrist (2016 MVP) receiving a 2017 Chevrolet Camaro SS Convertible 50th Anniversary Edition, and Corey Seager (2020 MVP) receiving a 2021 Chevrolet Tahoe Z71.

A trophy has also been presented to the award winner since at least the late 1970s. In 1985, Major League Baseball (MLB) took over as the official award presenter from Sport magazine, although for a few years, MLB and Sport each presented different trophies to the winner. Trophies given to award winners include:

- A wooden base supporting a metallic baseball inside a hoop; in use by 1978, and last presented in 1984.
- A tall wooden base with a metallic baseball on top, surrounded by a number of metallic flags; first presented in 1985, and last presented in 1988. The text on this trophy read "Sport Magazine's World Series Most Valuable Player Award".
- A metallic bowl on a wooden base; in use by 1987, apparently the MLB-awarded trophy.
- A trapezoidal wooden base, which included the MLB logo, topped by a metallic baseball; first awarded in 1988.
- A pyramid-shaped trophy with a dark base, clear body, and baseball on top; in use by 1995.
- A scaled-down variant of the Commissioner's Trophy with a single large metallic pennant; last presented in 2017.
- A wooden pedestal topped by a bronze sculpture of Willie Mays making "The Catch" in the 1954 World Series; in use since 2018.

== Winners ==
Key
Year	Links to an article about the corresponding World Series
Other awards	Player also won, in the same season: ASG: All-Star Game MVP Award CY: Cy Young Award LCS: League Championship Series MVP Award MVP: Major League Baseball MVP Award
†	Inductee of the National Baseball Hall of Fame
‡	Player is still active in professional baseball
#	Player was a rookie that season
§	Player's team lost the World Series
^	Multiple award winners in the same World Series
(#)	Number of times winning World Series MVP at that point (if more than one)

Year	Player	Team	Position	Selected statistics	Other awards	Ref.
1955	Johnny Podres	Brooklyn Dodgers	Starting pitcher	2–0 record over 2 games started; both were complete games; 1 shutout; 2 earned runs allowed over 18 innings pitched; 10 strikeouts		
1956	Don Larsen	New York Yankees	Starting pitcher	1–0 record over 2 games started; perfect game in Game 5; 7 strikeouts; Pitched first no-hitter and only perfect game in World Series history		
1957	Lew Burdette	Milwaukee Braves	Starting pitcher	3–0 record over 3 games started; all were complete games; 2 shutouts; 2 earned runs allowed over 27 innings pitched; 13 strikeouts		
1958	Bob Turley	New York Yankees	Pitcher	2–1 record and 1 save over 4 appearances (2 starts); 1 shutout; 5 earned runs allowed over 16 1/3 innings pitched; 13 strikeouts	CY	
1959	Larry Sherry^{#}	Los Angeles Dodgers	Relief pitcher	2–0 record and 2 saves over 4 appearances; 1 earned run allowed over 12 2/3 innings pitched; 5 strikeouts		
1960	Bobby Richardson	New York Yankees^{§}	Second baseman	.367 batting average; 1 grand slam; 12 runs batted in		
1961	Whitey Ford^{†}	New York Yankees	Starting pitcher	2–0 record over 2 games started; 1 shutout; 14 scoreless innings pitched; 7 strikeouts	CY	
1962	Ralph Terry	New York Yankees	Starting pitcher	2–1 record over 3 games started; 2 complete games- 1 shutout; 5 earned runs allowed over 25 innings pitched; 16 strikeouts		
1963	Sandy Koufax^{†}	Los Angeles Dodgers	Starting pitcher	2–0 record over 2 games started; both were complete games; 3 earned runs allowed over 18 innings pitched; 23 strikeouts	CY; MVP	
1964	Bob Gibson^{†}	St. Louis Cardinals	Starting pitcher	2–1 record over 3 games started; 2 complete games; 27 innings pitched; 31 strikeouts		
1965	Sandy Koufax^{†} (2)	Los Angeles Dodgers	Starting pitcher	2–1 record over 3 games started; 2 shutouts; 1 earned run allowed over 24 innings pitched; 29 strikeouts	CY	
1966	Frank Robinson^{†}	Baltimore Orioles	Outfielder	.286 batting average; 2 home runs; 3 runs batted in	MVP	
1967	Bob Gibson^{†} (2)	St. Louis Cardinals	Starting pitcher	3–0 record over 3 games started; all were complete games; 1 shutout; 3 earned runs allowed over 27 innings pitched; 26 strikeouts		
1968	Mickey Lolich	Detroit Tigers	Starting pitcher	3–0 record over 3 games started; all were complete games; 5 earned runs allowed over 27 innings pitched; 21 strikeouts		
1969	Donn Clendenon	New York Mets	First baseman	.357 batting average; 3 home runs; 4 runs batted in		
1970	Brooks Robinson^{†}	Baltimore Orioles	Third baseman	.429 batting average; 2 home runs; 6 runs batted in		
1971	Roberto Clemente^{†}	Pittsburgh Pirates	Outfielder	.414 batting average; 2 home runs; 4 runs batted in		
1972	Gene Tenace	Oakland Athletics	Catcher	.348 batting average; 4 home runs; 9 runs batted in		
1973	Reggie Jackson^{†}	Oakland Athletics	Outfielder	.310 batting average; 1 home run; 6 runs batted in	MVP	
1974	Rollie Fingers^{†}	Oakland Athletics	Relief pitcher	1–0 record and 2 saves over 4 appearances; 2 earned runs allowed over 9 1/3 innings pitched; 6 strikeouts		
1975	Pete Rose	Cincinnati Reds	Third baseman	.370 batting average; 10 hits; 2 runs batted in		
1976	Johnny Bench^{†}	Cincinnati Reds	Catcher	.533 batting average; 2 home runs; 6 runs batted in		
1977	Reggie Jackson^{†} (2)	New York Yankees	Outfielder	.450 batting average; 5 home runs (3 in Game 6); 8 runs batted in		
1978	Bucky Dent	New York Yankees	Shortstop	.417 batting average; 10 hits; 7 runs batted in		
1979	Willie Stargell^{†}	Pittsburgh Pirates	First baseman	.400 batting average; 7 extra-base hits; 7 runs batted in	LCS; MVP	
1980	Mike Schmidt^{†}	Philadelphia Phillies	Third baseman	.381 batting average; 2 home runs; 7 runs batted in	MVP	
1981^	Ron Cey	Los Angeles Dodgers	Third baseman	.350 batting average; 1 home run; 6 runs batted in		
1981^	Pedro Guerrero	Los Angeles Dodgers	Outfielder	.333 batting average; 4 extra-base hits; 7 runs batted in		
1981^	Steve Yeager	Los Angeles Dodgers	Catcher	.286 batting average; 2 home runs; 4 runs batted in		
1982	Darrell Porter	St. Louis Cardinals	Catcher	.286 batting average; 1 home run; 5 runs batted in	LCS	
1983	Rick Dempsey	Baltimore Orioles	Catcher	.385 batting average; 5 hits; all were extra-base hits- (4 doubles and 1 home run); 2 runs batted in		
1984	Alan Trammell^{†}	Detroit Tigers	Shortstop	.450 batting average; 2 home runs; 6 runs batted in		
1985	Bret Saberhagen	Kansas City Royals	Starting pitcher	2–0 record over 2 games started; both were complete games- 1 shutout; 1 earned run allowed over 18 innings pitched; 10 strikeouts	CY	
1986	Ray Knight	New York Mets	Third baseman	.391 batting average; Series-winning home run in 7th inning of Game 7; 5 runs batted in		
1987	Frank Viola	Minnesota Twins	Starting pitcher	2–1 record over 3 games started; 8 earned runs allowed over 19 1/3 innings pitched; 16 strikeouts		
1988	Orel Hershiser	Los Angeles Dodgers	Starting pitcher	2–0 record over 2 games started; both were complete games- 1 shutout; 1.000 batting average; 2 doubles; 2.667 OPS; 17 strikeouts	CY; LCS	
1989	Dave Stewart	Oakland Athletics	Starting pitcher	2–0 record over 2 games started; 1 shutout; 3 earned runs allowed over 16 innings pitched; 14 strikeouts		
1990	José Rijo	Cincinnati Reds	Starting pitcher	2–0 record over 2 games started; 1 earned run allowed over 15 1/3 innings pitched; 14 strikeouts		
1991	Jack Morris^{†}	Minnesota Twins	Starting pitcher	2–0 record over 3 games started; 10-inning shutout in Game 7; 3 earned runs allowed over 23 innings pitched; 15 strikeouts		
1992	Pat Borders	Toronto Blue Jays	Catcher	.450 batting average; 1 home run; 3 runs batted in		
1993	Paul Molitor^{†}	Toronto Blue Jays	Designated hitter, first baseman, third baseman	.500 batting average; 12 hits; 6 extra-base hits; 8 runs batted in/10 runs scored		
1994	Series canceled due to player's strike					
1995	Tom Glavine^{†}	Atlanta Braves	Starting pitcher	2–0 record over 2 games started; 2 earned runs allowed over 14 innings pitched; 11 strikeouts		
1996	John Wetteland	New York Yankees	Relief pitcher	4 saves over 5 appearances; 1 earned run allowed over 4 1/3 innings pitched; 6 strikeouts		
1997	Liván Hernández^{#}	Florida Marlins	Starting pitcher	2–0 record over 2 games started; 13 2/3 innings pitched; 7 strikeouts	LCS	
1998	Scott Brosius	New York Yankees	Third baseman	.471 batting average; 2 home runs in Game 3; 6 runs batted in		
1999	Mariano Rivera^{†}	New York Yankees	Relief pitcher	1–0 record and 2 saves in 3 appearances; 4 2/3 scoreless innings pitched; 3 strikeouts		
2000	Derek Jeter^{†}	New York Yankees	Shortstop	.409 batting average; 2 home runs/ 19 total bases; 6 runs scored	ASG	
2001^	Randy Johnson^{†}	Arizona Diamondbacks	Pitcher	3–0 record over 3 appearances (2 starts); 1 shutout; 2 earned runs allowed over 17 1/3 innings pitched; 19 strikeouts	CY	
2001^	Curt Schilling	Arizona Diamondbacks	Starting pitcher	1–0 record over 3 games started; 4 earned runs allowed over 21 1/3 innings pitched; 26 strikeouts		
2002	Troy Glaus	Anaheim Angels	Third baseman	.385 batting average; 3 home runs; 8 runs batted in		
2003	Josh Beckett	Florida Marlins	Starting pitcher	1–1 record over 2 games started; 1 shutout; 2 earned runs allowed over 16 1/3 innings pitched; 19 strikeouts		
2004	Manny Ramirez	Boston Red Sox	Outfielder	.412 batting average; 1 home run; 4 runs batted in		
2005	Jermaine Dye	Chicago White Sox	Outfielder	.438 batting average; 1 home run; 3 runs batted in		
2006	David Eckstein	St. Louis Cardinals	Shortstop	.364 batting average; 8 hits; 4 runs batted in		
2007	Mike Lowell	Boston Red Sox	Third baseman	.400 batting average; 1 home run; 4 runs batted in		
2008	Cole Hamels	Philadelphia Phillies	Starting pitcher	1–0 record over 2 games started; 4 earned runs allowed over 13 innings pitched; 8 strikeouts	LCS	
2009	Hideki Matsui	New York Yankees	Designated hitter	.615 batting average; 3 home runs; 8 runs batted in		
2010	Edgar Rentería	San Francisco Giants	Shortstop	.412 batting average; 2 home runs; 6 runs batted in		
2011	David Freese	St. Louis Cardinals	Third baseman	.348 batting average; Game tying triple in the 9th and Walk-off home run in 11th inning of Game 6; 7 runs batted in	LCS	
2012	Pablo Sandoval	San Francisco Giants	Third baseman	.500 batting average; 3 home runs in Game 1; 4 runs batted in	ASG	
2013	David Ortiz^{†}	Boston Red Sox	Designated hitter	.688 batting average; 2 home runs / 4 intentional walks; 6 runs batted in	ASG	
2014	Madison Bumgarner	San Francisco Giants	Pitcher	2–0 record and 1 save over 3 appearances (2 starts); 1 shutout; 1 earned run allowed over 21 innings pitched; 17 strikeouts	LCS	
2015	Salvador Pérez^{‡}	Kansas City Royals	Catcher	.364 batting average; 51 innings caught in 5 games played; 3 runs scored	ASG	
2016	Ben Zobrist	Chicago Cubs	Outfielder	.357 batting average; 10 hits, including go-ahead RBI double in 10th inning of Game 7; 5 runs scored	ASG	
2017	George Springer^{‡}	Houston Astros	Outfielder	.379 batting average; 5 home runs, 7 runs batted in; 8 runs scored, 11 hits	ASG	
2018	Steve Pearce	Boston Red Sox	First baseman	.333 batting average; 3 home runs, 8 runs batted in; 1.167 slugging percentage		
2019	Stephen Strasburg	Washington Nationals	Starting pitcher	2–0 record over 2 games started; 4 earned runs allowed over 14 innings pitched; 14 strikeouts		
2020	Corey Seager^{‡}	Los Angeles Dodgers	Shortstop	.400 batting average; 2 home runs; 5 runs batted in	LCS	
2021	Jorge Soler^{‡}	Atlanta Braves	Outfielder, designated hitter	.300 batting average; 3 go-ahead home runs; 6 runs batted in		
2022	Jeremy Peña^{#}^{‡}	Houston Astros	Shortstop	.400 batting average; 10 hits, including a go-ahead home run in the fourth inning of Game 5; 1.023 on-base plus slugging	LCS	
2023	Corey Seager^{‡} (2)	Texas Rangers	Shortstop	3 home runs, including a game-tying home run in the ninth inning of Game 1; 6 runs batted in; 1.137 on-base plus slugging		
2024	Freddie Freeman^{‡}	Los Angeles Dodgers	First baseman	.300 batting average; 4 home runs, including a game-winning grand slam in the tenth inning of Game 1; 12 runs batted in		
2025	Yoshinobu Yamamoto^{‡}	Los Angeles Dodgers	Pitcher	3–0 record over 2 games started (1 complete game) and 1 relief appearance; 2 earned runs allowed over 17 2/3 innings pitched, including 6 innings in Game 6 and 2 2/3 innings in relief in Game 7; 15 strikeouts		
2026	William Contreras^{‡}	Milwaukee Brewers	Catcher	.381 batting average, 4 RBIs and an .864 OPS; 10-for-13 in ABS challenges; 4 runners caught stealing		

=== Winners by team and by position ===
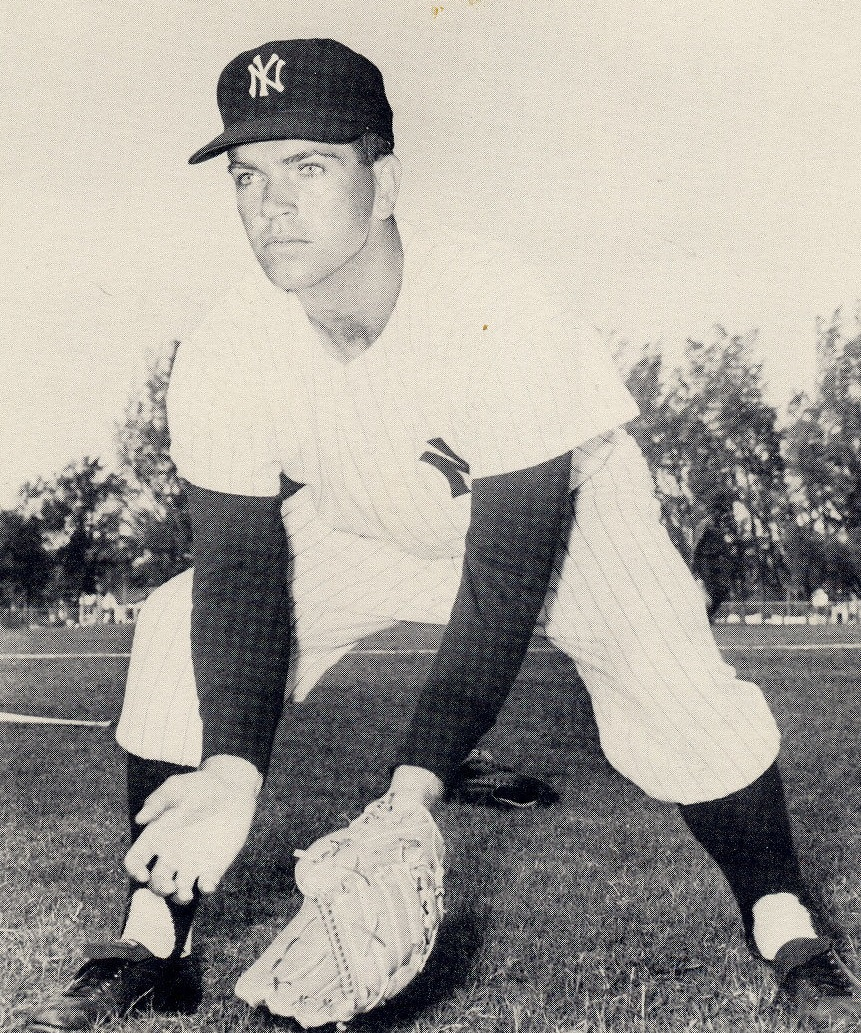
Bobby Richardson, the only second baseman to have won the award

From 1955 through 2025, a total of 71 seasons, there have been 70 editions of the World Series played (there was no World Series in 1994). In 68 editions, a single MVP was named; in 1981, three MVPs were named; and in 2001, two MVPs were named. Thus, there have been a total of 73 MVPs.

The position at which players have won the most MVPs is pitcher, 30 times. Four of those winners were exclusively relief pitchers, the most recent being Mariano Rivera in 1999. Twelve of the first 14 MVPs were pitchers. From 1969 through 1986, the prevalence of pitcher MVPs declined, as only two pitchers won the award during this period. From 1987 through 1991, all of the MVPs were pitchers. Since 1995, 31 years ago, pitchers have won the award eleven times, the most recent being Yoshinobu Yamamoto in 2025.

The most uncommon position for an MVP is second baseman, with only Bobby Richardson in 1960 winning at the position. Richardson is also the only MVP to be named from a losing World Series team.

Of the 30 current MLB franchises, 25 have had at least one MVP. The five that have not are the Cleveland Guardians, Colorado Rockies, San Diego Padres, Seattle Mariners, and Tampa Bay Rays. Of those five franchises, four have never won a World Series with Seattle never having been in a World Series and Cleveland last won in 1948, prior to the MVP award being established.

Winners by team
Team	Total
New York Yankees	12
Los Angeles/Brooklyn Dodgers	11
St. Louis Cardinals	5
Boston Red Sox	4
Oakland Athletics	4
Baltimore Orioles	3
Cincinnati Reds	3
Atlanta/Milwaukee Braves	3
San Francisco Giants	3
Arizona Diamondbacks	2
Detroit Tigers	2
Miami/Florida Marlins	2
Houston Astros	2
Kansas City Royals	2
Minnesota Twins	2
New York Mets	2
Philadelphia Phillies	2
Pittsburgh Pirates	2
Toronto Blue Jays	2
Los Angeles/Anaheim Angels	1
Chicago Cubs	1
Chicago White Sox	1
Milwaukee Brewers	1
Texas Rangers	1
Washington Nationals	1

Winners by position
Position	Total
Pitcher	30
Third baseman	10
Outfielder	10
Shortstop	8
Catcher	8
First baseman	4
Designated hitter	3
Second baseman	1

Note: When a player is listed at multiple positions in the main table, the first position is deemed to be his primary position, and he has been counted here as such.

== Notable accomplishments ==
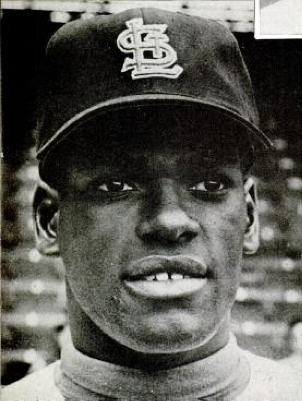
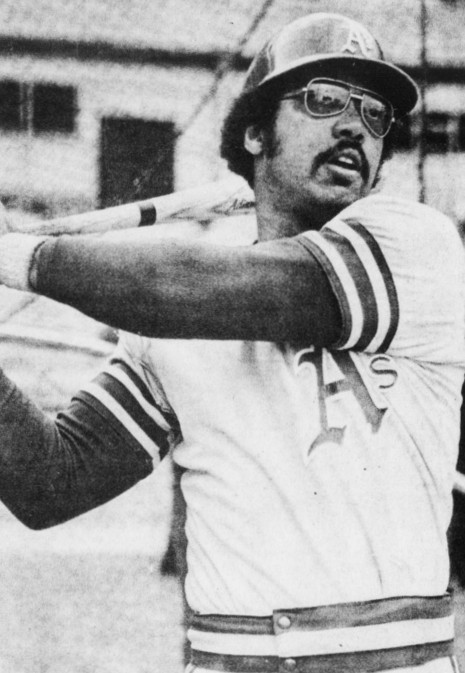
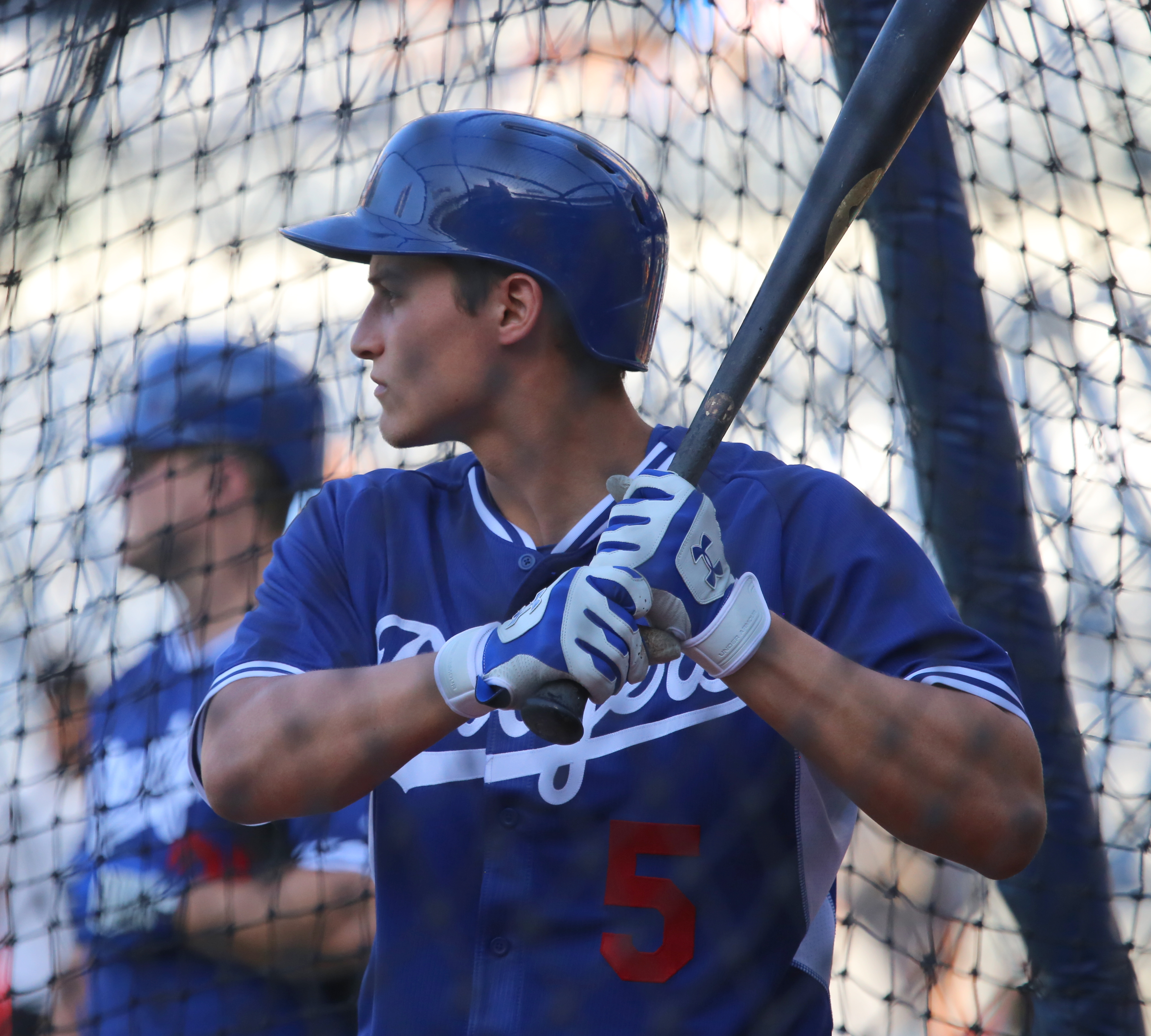
Sandy Koufax, Bob Gibson, Reggie Jackson, and Corey Seager are the only players who have been named World Series MVP multiple times; each won the award twice.

Four players have won the award twice: Sandy Koufax (1963, 1965), Bob Gibson (1964, 1967), Reggie Jackson (1973, 1977), and Corey Seager (2020, 2023). Jackson and Seager are the only players to have won the award with two different teams, while Seager is the first player to win the award in both leagues. Additionally, Koufax, Gibson, and Jackson all won their first MVP's playing against a team that Yogi Berra either played or managed (1963 - played for the Yankees, 1964 - managed the Yankees, and 1973 - managed the Mets).

A total of 14 players born outside of the United States have been named World Series MVP, with Pedro Guerrero, a native of the Dominican Republic, being the first to win it in 1981. Of players born outside the U.S., the Dominican Republic has produced the most World Series MVP winners, with five. Venezuela has produced three, Cuba and Japan have produced two each, and Colombia and Panama have each produced one. California-born Freddie Freeman, the 2024 MVP, holds dual citizenship in both the U.S. and Canada.

=== Pitchers ===
- Johnny Podres won the inaugural award in 1955, with the Brooklyn Dodgers. Podres, with a 9–10 win–loss record during the regular season, beat the Yankees twice in the series; both victories were complete games.
- Don Larsen won the 1956 award after pitching the only individual no-hitter in World Series history, in the fifth game of the series; the no-hitter was also a perfect game.
- Bruce Hurst of the Boston Red Sox had been voted MVP of the 1986 World Series during Game 6, before the New York Mets staged a comeback and went on to win in seven games, with Ray Knight being named the MVP.
- 1989 winner Dave Stewart was the first pitcher to win two games each in a League Championship Series and a World Series in the same postseason.
- 1996 winner John Wetteland set a World Series record with four saves.
- The 2001 co-MVPs, Randy Johnson and Curt Schilling, combined for all four of Arizona's wins in the Series.
- Stephen Strasburg, the 2019 winner, is the only first overall selection in a Major League Baseball draft to win the award.

=== Position players ===
- Bobby Richardson, winner of the 1960 award, had 12 runs batted in, a World Series record.
- 1977 winner Reggie Jackson hit three home runs in the Series' deciding game, taking the nickname "Mr. October", as October is the primary month of the MLB postseason. Jackson had a total of five home runs in the series, a World Series record.
- Willie Stargell won the 1979 award at the age of 39, and remains the oldest player to be named World Series MVP.
- Barry Bonds was voted the 2002 World Series MVP the day before the Anaheim Angels staged a comeback in Game 6 and won in seven games, resulting in Troy Glaus being named the MVP.
- Hideki Matsui, the 2009 winner, batted in six runs in the sixth game of the 2009 World Series, tying Richardson's record for most runs batted in for a single World Series game. Matsui became the first Japanese-born player to win the award and the first player to win it as a full-time designated hitter. He is also the only player named both a World Series MVP and a Japan Series MVP.

=== Other awards ===
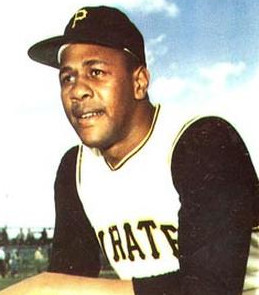
Willie Stargell was named MLB MVP, LCS MVP, and World Series MVP in 1979.

Six pitchers have won the Cy Young Award and the World Series MVP in the same season: Bob Turley (1958), Whitey Ford (1961), Koufax (1963, 1965), Bret Saberhagen (1985), Orel Hershiser (1988), and Johnson (2001). The Cy Young Award was initiated in 1956, as one award for all of MLB; it has been awarded in both leagues since 1967.

Nine players have been named both a League Championship Series MVP and the World Series MVP in the same postseason: Willie Stargell (1979), Darrell Porter (1982), Orel Hershiser (1988), Liván Hernández (1997), Cole Hamels (2008), David Freese (2011), Madison Bumgarner (2014), Corey Seager (2020), and Jeremy Peña (2022). The LCS MVP was first awarded in 1977 for the National League and in 1980 for the American League.

To date, only one World Series MVP has also won the Major League Baseball All-Star Game Most Valuable Player Award in the same season: Derek Jeter in 2000. An All-Star Game MVP has been named since 1962.

Five players have received both a Major League Baseball Most Valuable Player Award and the World Series MVP Award in the same season: Sandy Koufax (1963), Frank Robinson (1966), Reggie Jackson (1973), Willie Stargell (1979), and Mike Schmidt (1980). The MLB MVP has been awarded to a player in each league since 1931.

Three players have won a World Series MVP plus two of the above awards in the same season:

- Sandy Koufax – MLB MVP, Cy Young, and World Series MVP in 1963
- Willie Stargell – MLB MVP, LCS MVP, and World Series MVP in 1979
- Orel Hershiser – Cy Young, LCS MVP, and World Series MVP in 1988

== See also ==
- Babe Ruth Award
- List of Major League Baseball awards
