= KTEH =

KTEH may refer to:

- KTEH-LP, a low-power radio station (98.9 FM) licensed to serve Los Molinos, California, United States
- KQEH, a television station (channel 50, virtual 54) licensed to serve San Jose, California, which held the call sign KTEH from 1964 to 2011
