= Dusty Rhodes (outfielder) =

American baseball player (1927-2009)

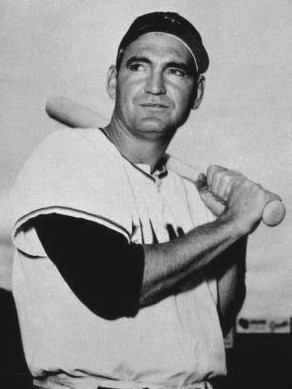
- Outfielder
- Born: May 13, 1927; Montgomery County, Alabama, U.S.
- Died: June 17, 2009 (aged 82); Las Vegas, Nevada, U.S.
- Batted: Left Threw: Right

MLB debut
- July 15, 1952, for the New York Giants

Last MLB appearance
- September 27, 1959, for the San Francisco Giants

MLB statistics
- Batting average: .253
- Home runs: 54
- Runs batted in: 207
- Stats at Baseball Reference

Teams
- New York / San Francisco Giants (1952–1957, 1959)

Career highlights and awards
- World Series champion (1954)

James Lamar "Dusty" Rhodes (May 13, 1927 – June 17, 2009) was an American professional baseball player, an outfielder and pinch hitter whose otherwise unremarkable seven-year Major League Baseball career was dramatically highlighted by his starring role for the champion New York Giants during the 1954 season and that year's World Series.

== Early career ==
Born in Mathews, Alabama, Rhodes served in the United States Navy during World War II and began his professional career in 1946. A left-handed hitter, he threw right-handed and was listed as 6 feet (1.8 m) tall and 178 pounds (81 kg). He signed with the Double-A Nashville Vols, a Chicago Cubs' farm club at the time, and languished in the lower levels of the Cub organization for five seasons until the Giants affiliated with the Vols in 1952 and took over Rhodes' major league rights.

Although considered a poor defensive outfielder and, off the field, a lover of nightlife, Rhodes was a strong batsman. He led the Class B Tri-State League in hits and batted .344 in 1951, and was hitting .347 for Nashville in 1952 when the Giants purchased his contract in July.

Rhodes batted a combined .242 with 21 homers in 143 games played during the remainder of 1952 and all of 1953, setting the stage for his remarkable and unlikely 1954 campaign.

During the regular season, in 82 games played and only 186 plate appearances, Rhodes slugged 15 home runs, drove home 50 runs batted in, and compiled an on-base plus slugging percentage of 1.105. He appeared in the field in only 37 games (starting 30 in the outfield), but batted .364. He was often used as a pinch-hitter for right-handed-batting Monte Irvin, an eventual Baseball Hall of Famer, and for the season he hit .329 with two home runs in pinch hitting roles. An August 29 doubleheader at St. Louis was a microcosm of Rhodes' regular season. He came into the first game in the eighth inning, batting for Irvin, tripled, and scored to tie the game and send it to extra innings. He stayed in as the left fielder and tripled again in the tenth to drive in the Giants' leading run; but the Cardinals came back to tie and then win the contest in 11 innings. Rhodes then started the nightcap in left field, got four hits in five at bats, hit two homers and two doubles, scored three runs, and drove in two. His performance equaled an MLB record for most extra-base hits (six) in a doubleheader.

With Rhodes putting up a .341 batting average overall, the Giants—led by superstar Willie Mays and 20-game-winner Johnny Antonelli—won the National League pennant by five full games, their first league title since 1951.

== 1954 World Series star ==
The Giants were matched in the 1954 World Series against the Cleveland Indians, who had set an American League record by winning 111 games. Rhodes appeared in three games, entering each as a pinch hitter for left fielder Irvin.

- In the tenth inning of Game 1 with the score tied at two, Rhodes batted for Irvin with two runners on base and one out. Facing a future Hall of Fame pitcher, Bob Lemon, Rhodes lofted a game-winning, walk-off home run over the Polo Grounds' short right-field fence. Mays' brilliant catch of Vic Wertz's long drive in the eighth inning and Rhodes' game-deciding homer helped turn the tide for the underdog Giants against favored Cleveland.
- In Game 2, with the Indians ahead 1–0 and another Hall of Famer, Early Wynn, on the mound, Rhodes pinch-hit for Irvin in the fifth inning and drilled a single to center field that drove in a run, tying the score. Staying in the game as the Giants' left fielder, Rhodes came up again in the seventh inning against Wynn with New York ahead, 2–1. He hit another home run, a solo blast, to give the Giants an insurmountable 3–1 lead.
- Then, in Game 3 at Cleveland Stadium, Rhodes batted for Irvin in the third inning and hit a two-run single off 20-game-winner Mike Garcia to extend the Giants' lead to 3–0. Again he remained in the game in left field, but went 0-for-2 with a base on balls at the plate. New York eventually won, 6–2.

Rhodes was not needed in Game 4. Irvin's two hits and two runs batted in helped seal a 7–4 victory for the Giants, and a four-game Series sweep, their first Fall Classic title since 1933. Rhodes had gone to the plate seven times, collected four hits (including two homers) and a base on balls, scored two runs, and driven in seven. His World Series on-base plus slugging percentage was 2.381.

Said his Hall of Fame manager, Leo Durocher: "He thought he was the greatest hitter in the world, and for that one year, I never saw a better one. The best pinch hitter I ever saw, no contest. Every time we needed a pinch hit to win a ballgame, there was Dusty Rhodes to deliver it for us."

Roy Campanella, the Brooklyn Dodger catcher, said of Durocher and his penchant for using Rhodes: "If they have to pinch hit Rhodes for Irvin, they must be hurting." But Mays mocked this assumption in his autobiography; he considered Rhodes to be a "fabulous hitter". Mays said, the first time he met Rhodes, he overheard him telling another player, "You could drink in this weather and you could play ball in this weather. Some guys can't do either, but I can do both."

Despite his reputation for being a partier off the field, Rhodes held Durocher's respect because Durocher could count on him to be ready to play every day.

== Late playing career ==
Rhodes' 1955 season, though anticlimactic, was his second-best as a major leaguer. He again hit over .300 (finishing at .305 in 94 games played). But the Giants lagged 181/2 games behind the first-place Dodgers, and Durocher resigned to go into sportscasting. Rhodes spent the full seasons of 1956 and 1957 with the Giants, their last two years in New York City, but he hit only .217 and .205 with 12 total home runs. The club moved to San Francisco in 1958, but Rhodes spent the year with the Triple-A Phoenix Giants. He returned to the MLB Giants in 1959, and appeared in 54 games, all as a pinch hitter; but he collected only nine hits (with no home runs) and batted only .188. He then returned to Triple-A for three final pro seasons and retired after the 1962 campaign.

As a major leaguer, Rhodes played in 576 games, all as a Giant. His 296 hits included 44 doubles, 10 triples and 54 homers. He batted .253 lifetime. The 1954 World Series was his only postseason experience.

== In retirement ==
After his baseball career, Rhodes returned to New York City and worked for a friend on a tugboat for 25 years, a job which he said he loved. When asked why his career was so short, Rhodes said, "After Durocher left the Giants, baseball wasn't fun anymore." In Jim Bouton’s Ball Four, Rhodes is mentioned as being a bus driver at the New York World’s Fair after his baseball career had ended. He died of emphysema in Las Vegas Nevada on June 17 2009 at age 82.
