= Vic Wertz =

American baseball player (1925–1983)

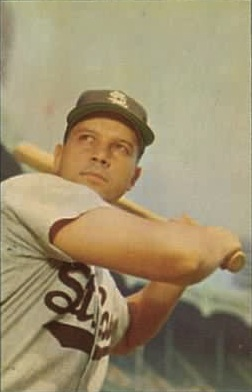
- Wertz with the St. Louis Browns in 1953
- Right fielder / First baseman
- Born: February 9, 1925; York, Pennsylvania, U.S.
- Died: July 7, 1983 (aged 58); Detroit, Michigan, U.S.
- Batted: Left Threw: Right

MLB debut
- April 15, 1947, for the Detroit Tigers

Last MLB appearance
- September 19, 1963, for the Minnesota Twins

MLB statistics
- Batting average: .277
- Home runs: 266
- Runs batted in: 1,178
- Stats at Baseball Reference

Teams
- Detroit Tigers (1947–1952); St. Louis Browns / Baltimore Orioles (1952–1954); Cleveland Indians (1954–1958); Boston Red Sox (1959–1961); Detroit Tigers (1961–1963); Minnesota Twins (1963)

Career highlights and awards
- 4× All-Star (1949, 1951, 1952, 1957)

Victor Woodrow Wertz (February 9, 1925 – July 7, 1983) was an American professional baseball first baseman and outfielder. He had a 17-year Major League Baseball (MLB) career from 1947 to 1963. Wertz played for the Detroit Tigers, St. Louis Browns / Baltimore Orioles, Cleveland Indians, Boston Red Sox, and Minnesota Twins; all teams within the American League. After having contracted polio in August 1955, ending his season and putting his future in jeopardy, Wertz returned in 1956 to hit 32 home runs and receive the Comeback Player of the Year award. He was involved in one of the most famous World Series plays in MLB history when Willie Mays made a spectacular catch of his over 400 ft fly ball to center field in Game 1 of the 1954 World Series, known as "The Catch".

== Early life ==
Wertz was born on February 9, 1925, in York, Pennsylvania, to Paul and Manerva Wertz. He later moved to Reading, Pennsylvania and attended Reading High School. Wertz was signed as a free agent by the Detroit Tigers in 1942. In June 1943 at age 18, he was inducted into the United States Army during World War II. Wertz was discharged as a staff sergeant in December 1945. He was stationed in the Pacific theater during part of his military service.

== Professional career ==
=== Minor leagues ===
Wertz played in the Tigers' minor league system until making his major league debut in 1947, with time away during his military service.

In 1942, the Tigers assigned the 17-year old Wertz to the Winston-Salem Twins of the Class B Piedmont League. He had a .239 batting average in 63 games. In 1943, he had played in only 18 games, with 18 at bats, for the Double-A Buffalo Bisons before being inducted into the Army. After his military service, Wertz returned to the Tigers system for the 1946 season, and was assigned to the Bisons again, now a Triple-A team in the International League. Wertz had a .301 batting average, with 19 home runs, 91 runs batted in (RBIs), 75 runs scored and an .882 OPS (on-base plus slugging). He played as an outfielder in 128 of his 139 games played. He had the sixth highest batting average in the International League among hitters with more than 400 at bats (Jackie Robinson leading the league at .349), was seventh in home runs and eighth in RBIs.

=== Detroit Tigers ===
Wertz played in 102 games for the Tigers as a rookie in 1947, starting 79 games in the outfield. He hit .288, with six home runs, 44 RBIs, 60 runs scored and an .809 OPS. Wertz started on opening day in place of the injured Dick Wakefield. In his first game in the Major Leagues, Wertz led the team to victory, going 2-for-5 with a double, run, RBI and stolen base, while also making a spectacular defensive play in the outfield. Manager Steve O'Neill decided to continue starting Wertz after that game. Later that season, Wertz hit for the cycle on September 14, 1947. He was the first Tiger to hit for the cycle as a rookie.

In 1948, Wertz started 97 of his 119 games in the Tigers' outfield. He hit .248, with seven home runs, 67 RBIs and 49 runs scored. His breakout season for the Tigers came in 1949, the first year he was selected to play in the All-Star Game. He tied for the American League (AL) lead in games played with Vern Stevens and Ted Williams (155). Wertz hit .304, with 20 home runs, a career-high 133 RBIs (third best in the AL behind Stevens and Williams), 96 runs scored (ninth best in the AL) and an .851 OPS. He was tenth in the AL's 1949 Most Valuable Player voting.

In 1950, Wertz hit .308, with 27 home runs, 123 RBIs, 99 runs scored, a career high 91 base on balls, and a career-high .941 OPS. He tied a Major League record that season by hitting home runs in five consecutive games. He was again 10th in AL Most Valuable Player voting. In 1950, Wertz lost some playing time in spring training and during the season to lower leg injuries resulting from foul balls he hit into his own lower legs and feet. He began the practice of wearing shin guards to protect himself from this recurrent problem, and continued to do so throughout his career. The shin guard never caused him any trouble until the 1954 World Series where it encumbered his ability to take an extra base.

In 1951, he made the AL All-Star team for the second time. He hit .285, with 27 home runs, 94 RBIs, 86 runs scored and an .894 OPS. He made the AL All-Star team again in 1952, but missed three weeks of play with a pulled muscle. On August 14, 1952, the Tigers traded Wertz, Dick Littlefield, Marlin Stuart and Don Lenhardt to the St. Louis Browns for Jim Delsing, Ned Garver, Dave Madison and Bud Black.

The key to the trade for the Tigers was pitcher Garver, who had won 20 games in 1951, but was pitching with a sore arm in 1952. Although the trade deadline had passed, because the Browns were in seventh place and the Tigers in eighth (last) place, Browns owner Bill Veeck and Tigers general manager Charlie Gehringer could use the waiver process to effect the trade. Wertz was hitting .246, with 17 home runs and 51 RBIs in only 285 at bats when he was traded. Garver pitched in only one game for the Tigers in 1952, but from 1953 to 1955 he went 37–38 on Tigers teams that had only one winning season.

=== St. Louis Browns/Baltimore Orioles ===
Wertz finished out the 1952 season with the Browns, batting .346 in 130 at bats for St. Louis, with six home runs, 19 RBIs, 22 runs scored and a .968 OPS. He played the full 1953 season with the Browns, starting 117 games in right field. He hit .268, with 19 home runs and 70 RBIs. He led the team in home runs and RBIs, and had the highest team batting average among Browns players with over 400 at bats. The Browns moved to Baltimore before the 1954 season, becoming the Baltimore Orioles.

Wertz started 1954 as a member of the newly formed Baltimore Orioles. He started in right field for the Orioles in their first home game in Baltimore. The Orioles played in the then mammoth Memorial Stadium, which frustrated the power-hitting left-handed batter. On June 1, 1954, he was traded by the Baltimore Orioles to the Cleveland Indians for right-handed pitcher Bob Chakales. When Wertz was traded, he was hitting only .202 with one home run after 29 games, and was demoted from being a starter. The Baltimore fans came to jeer him harshly, and he described being traded to the Indians as "'just like a pardon from the governor'".

=== Cleveland Indians ===
==== 1954 ====
Wertz believed he had fallen into a rut with the Browns and Orioles, playing on losing teams, and considered joining Cleveland as a second chance. By contrast to his last team, the 1954 Indians finished 111–43, with the highest winning percentage of any team in Major League history (.721). He immediately became the starting first baseman for the Indians, replacing Bill Glynn, who held down the position the previous year. Wertz started 79 games at first base of the 94 games in which he played for Cleveland in 1954. He hit .275, with 14 home runs and 48 RBIs in only 285 at bats, with an .822 OPS.

The Indians were swept by the New York Giants in the 1954 World Series. Wertz, however, hit .500 during the World Series, and had the most hits of any player in that series (8); including two doubles, a triple, a home run, three RBIs and two runs scored. Wertz is not remembered for his offensive performance in the series; but rather for an out he made at a critical juncture in Game 1. Wertz hit a long fly ball that Hall of Fame center fielder Willie Mays caught, that came to be known as "The Catch". Wertz's fly ball went over 400 feet (120 m) to dead center of the Polo Grounds in New York, and a sportswriter said, "It would have been a home run in any other park, including Yellowstone."

==== "The Catch" ====
On September 29, 1954, Cleveland played the New York Giants in Game 1 of the 1954 World Series at the Polo Grounds in New York. Wertz had already hit two singles and a triple in the game, when he came up to bat in the eighth inning, with Larry Doby on second base and Al Rosen on first base, and the game tied 2–2. The Polo Grounds had an unusually deep straight-away center field, listed as 484 ft (147.5 m). Wertz hit the ball 425 or 460 feet to center field, but Willie Mays made an over-the-shoulder-catch, and had the presence of mind to prepare himself for making a strong throw back to the infield to keep Doby from scoring and giving Cleveland the lead. Mays was aware that a runner at the Polo Grounds could score from second base on a deep fly to center field, which Mays himself had done. Mays accomplished all of this with a spectacular catch and throw, the game stayed tied and then the Giants won in the 10th inning, 5–2, on a pinch hit Dusty Rhodes home run off of Hall of Fame pitcher Bob Lemon.

"The Catch" is generally considered one of the greatest defensive plays in World Series history. After he retired from playing, Wertz kept a photo of "The Catch" in his office at his beer distribution company and explained he had no negative feelings about being remembered for hitting a deep fly out. "I'm very proud that I'm remembered in connection with it. . . . I look at it this way: If it had been a home run or a triple, would people have remembered it? Not very likely", Wertz told United Press International (UPI) in 1979. He is also reported as saying, "I look at it this way: If that ball Willie caught had been a home run or a triple, how many people would've remembered me? Not many. This way, everybody who meets me for the first time always identifies me with Willie's catch, and that makes me feel good."

==== 1955-58 ====
The Indians were 93–61 in 1955, finishing in second place in the American League. Wertz season was cut short in late August, when he was hospitalized after having contracted polio. He hit .253 in 79 games, with 14 home runs and 55 RBIs before his season ended. Wertz returned to the Indians in 1956, wearing a leg brace. He was named Comeback Player of the Year, after hitting 32 home runs, with 106 RBIs. He only played first base, starting 133 games there for Cleveland, while also batting .264 in 481 at bats, with 65 runs scored, and a team second-best .874 OPS. He was ninth in AL Most Valuable Player voting in 1956.

In 1957, still exclusively playing first base, Wertz hit .282, with 28 home runs, 105 RBIs, 84 runs scored and an .857 OPS. He was named to the AL All-Star team for the fourth (and final) time, where he went 1-for-2 with an RBI. He was sixth in the 1957 AL Most Valuable Player voting. He broke his ankle 25 games into the 1958 season with Cleveland, and missed the remainder of the season, batting .279 in only 43 at bats on the year. In December 1958, Cleveland traded Wertz and Gary Geiger to the Boston Red Sox for Jimmy Piersall.

During his 473 career games in Cleveland, over five seasons, he hit .270, with 91 home runs, 326 RBIs and an .848 OPS.

=== Boston Red Sox, back to the Tigers, Minnesota Twins ===
The Red Sox kept Wertz at first base defensively, understanding his fielding and running ability were limited in recovering from polio and a broken ankle. Before the season began, team manager Mike Higgins knew he would have to rest Wertz, but hoped it would only be occasional. In 1959, however, Wertz played in only 94 games, batting .275 in 247 at bats, with seven home runs and 49 RBIs. He started only 56 games at first base. Once again he rebounded from physical adversity, and played in 131 games in 1960 for the Red Sox as their starting first baseman in 110 games. He hit .282 with 19 home runs and 103 RBIs; the fifth time in his then 14-year career he had over 100 RBIs in a season. He led all American League pinch hitters in 1960 with a .556 pinch hitting average.

In 1961, Wertz started 82 games at first base for the Red Sox. He suffered a rib injury that caused him to miss playing time. He was hitting .262, with 11 home runs and 59 RBIs when the Red Sox traded the 36-year old Wertz to the Tigers on September 8, 1961. At the time, the Tigers were in second place in the American League, 10 games behind the New York Yankees. Wertz only appeared in eight games for the Tigers, with six at bats that season for the Tigers. The Tigers won 101 games, but finished second to the Yankees 109 wins.

In 1962, Wertz appeared in 72 games for the Tigers, but was a starter in only 14. He hit .324, with five home runs and 18 RBIs in 105 at bats that season. As a pinch hitter in 1962, he hit .321 with three home runs. In 1963, the Tigers intended to use him primarily as a pinch hitter, while playing a backup role to first baseman Norm Cash. However, the Tigers released Wertz in early May 1963, and he was signed by the Minnesota Twins in mid-June.

He finished his final Major League season with the Twins, batting .136 in 44 at bats, with three home runs and seven RBIs. At the end of July 1963, Wertz announced he would be retiring at the end of the season. He hit pinch hit home runs on July 3 and August 23, and his other home run came as a starter on June 28 (one of only five games he started that season). The Twins released him in October 1963.

== Legacy and honors ==
Wertz finished in the Top 15 in MVP voting five times: 1949 (10th), 1950 (10th), 1956 (9th), 1957 (6th), and 1960 (14th); and was elected to the American League All-Star team four times (1949, 1951, 1952 and 1957). He was among the Top 10 in the American League in home runs in 1949 (20), 1950 (27), 1951 (27), 1952 (23), 1953 (19), 1956 (32), and 1957 (28). He had over 100 RBIs in a season five times. For his career, Wertz had a .277 batting average, hit 266 home runs, and had 1,178 RBIs with a .469 career slugging average and a .364 career on-base percentage. His .833 OPS is 261st all-time in Major League baseball, and his 266 home runs are 225th all-time (through 2025). He had 10 career grand slam home runs, tied for 66th all-time in Major League history (though 2025).

Wertz was inducted into the Pennsylvania Sports Hall of Fame on November 5, 1977. He was inducted into the Ohio Baseball Sports Hall of Fame in October 1980, and the Michigan Sports Hall of Fame on May 25, 1983, less than two months before his unexpected death. He was inducted into the York County (Pennsylvania) Hall of Fame in 1981.

Vic Wertz Field at the Berks County Youth Recreation Facility in Pennsylvania is named in his honor. The field was dedicated on April 19, 2013. Wertz was honored by the Orioles at a game on September 13, 1991.

== Personal life and death ==
Wertz was a World War II veteran. At age 30, in 1955, he was stricken with polio during the baseball season, and his doctors at Cleveland's University Hospital initially believed it was possible he could suffer long term paralysis. At one point, he was unconscious to his circumstances for five days, and awoke to find his left leg paralyzed. He missed the last six weeks of the 1955 season. However, Wertz recovered and was able to continue playing baseball; though he did have to wear a leg brace. His experience with polio started his desire to support charitable works. In April 1956, he publicly expressed his determination to come back in a newspaper column, because he knew how discouraging the disease was to children with polio, and their parents. He wanted to give them hope and encouragement, just as his recovery had been helped by the encouragement of others.

During and after his baseball career, Wertz worked in the Detroit area beer distribution business. He began in the business after his wife and he became friends with Baltimore Orioles owner Jerold Hoffberger and his wife. Hoffberger was president of National Bohemian Beer, who asked Wertz to work for Hoffberger's brewery. Even after Wertz was traded to Cleveland, Hoffberger still offered Wertz distribution rights in Mt. Clemens, Michigan. In the Winter of 1955, Wertz purchased the Maple Leaf Springs beer distributorship in Mt. Clemens. It had six employees at the time, and sold fewer than 100,000 cases of beer in his first year of ownership. By 1983, the year of Wertz's death, the company had become the Vic Wertz Distributing Company, doing $20 million of business annually, with 102 employees.

Wertz also collected automobiles and had 1936, 1952 and 1955 Roll Royce cars, and a 1955 Ford Thunderbird at the time of his death.

When he retired to Mount Clemens, he formed "Wertz Warriors", a group of sportsmen who raised funds for the Special Olympics Winter Games. He was the founder of an 800-mile snowmobile endurance ride, run annually in Michigan starting in 1982 to benefit the Special Olympics. He held an annual golf outing that raised $350,000 for the Boys Club over three years.

Wertz died during heart surgery at Detroit's Harper Hospital on the morning of July 7, 1983. Surgeons were performing a coronary bypass and replacing a valve in his heart after he had suffered a heart attack the previous day. He had suffered an even earlier heart attack on June 23, 1983, the same day the Detroit Free Press published a biographical article on Wertz focusing on his business and philanthropical work in the Detroit area. He had been residing at Grosse Point Farms at the time of his death. He is buried at Holy Sepulchre Cemetery in Southfield, Michigan. Willie Mays, who had played golf relatively recently with Wertz and was shocked by his death, said "'I'm very sorry that a very good friend of mine died'".

== See also ==
- List of Major League Baseball career home run leaders
- List of Major League Baseball career runs batted in leaders
- List of Major League Baseball players to hit for the cycle

Achievements
Preceded by Bobby Doerr	Hitting for the cycle September 14, 1947	Succeeded by Joe DiMaggio
