= Don Mueller =

American baseball player (1927–2011)

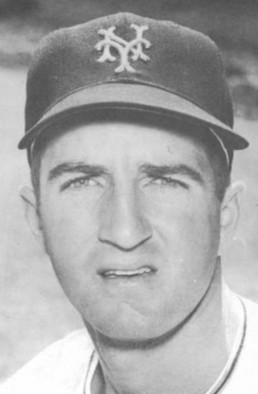
- Right fielder
- Born: April 14, 1927; St. Louis, Missouri, U.S.
- Died: December 28, 2011 (aged 84); St. Louis, Missouri, U.S.
- Batted: Left Threw: Right

MLB debut
- August 2, 1948, for the New York Giants

Last MLB appearance
- May 2, 1959, for the Chicago White Sox

MLB statistics
- Batting average: .296
- Home runs: 65
- Runs batted in: 520
- Stats at Baseball Reference

Teams
- New York Giants (1948–1957); Chicago White Sox (1958–1959)

Career highlights and awards
- 2× All-Star (1954, 1955); World Series champion (1954)

Donald Frederick Mueller (April 14, 1927 – December 28, 2011) was an American professional baseball player who played mainly as a right fielder in Major League Baseball for 12 seasons from 1948 until 1959. He batted left-handed and threw right-handed, and played for the New York Giants and the Chicago White Sox. He earned the nickname "Mandrake the Magician" for being adept at consistently putting the ball in play and delivering hits through the infield.

== Career ==
Mueller was born in St. Louis, Missouri, on April 14, 1927. His father, Walter Mueller, was also a major leaguer who spent parts of four seasons during the 1920s with the Pittsburgh Pirates. The younger Mueller was signed as an amateur free agent out of Christian Brothers College High School by the Giants in 1944.

=== New York Giants ===
Mueller spent the first ten seasons of his major league career with the Giants, for whom he batted over .300 for three consecutive seasons (1953–1955) and led the National League (NL) in hits in 1954 with 212.

Mueller played a central, but painful, role in the famous October 3, 1951, playoff game that won the NL pennant for the Giants. With New York trailing the Brooklyn Dodgers, 4–1, in the ninth inning, Mueller singled Alvin Dark to third base. With one out, Whitey Lockman doubled to score Dark, but Mueller sprained his ankle sliding into third. He was replaced by a pinch-runner, Clint Hartung, and carried from the field just before Bobby Thomson's "Shot Heard 'Round the World" won the game and the pennant for the Giants. Mueller missed the 1951 World Series due to his injury.

In 1954, Mueller hit for the cycle on July 11, finished second to teammate Willie Mays in the NL batting race, and hit .389 in the World Series to help lead the Giants to a four-game sweep of the Cleveland Indians. In Game 1 of the Series, Mueller was playing right field when Mays made "The Catch" in center field.

=== Chicago White Sox ===
Mueller finished his playing career with the White Sox, appearing in 70 games in 1958, and four games in 1959. He was released on May 15, 1959.

=== Statistics ===
In 1,245 MLB games played (1,171 as a Giant) Mueller compiled 1,292 hits, including 139 doubles, 37 triples and 65 home runs. He had 520 RBIs, and a career batting average of .296 with an OPS of .712. For his career, he walked just 167 times and only struck out 146 times. While he never hit more than 16 home runs in a season, he hit five home runs in two days, on September 1 and 2, 1951.

== Personal life ==
Mueller briefly scouted for the San Francisco Giants after his playing career ended. His son Mark played in the minor leagues in the early 1970s. In his later years, Mueller lived in Maryland Heights, Missouri. He died on December 28, 2011, six months after his wife, Genevieve.

== See also ==
- List of Major League Baseball players to hit for the cycle
- List of second-generation Major League Baseball players

Achievements
Preceded by Larry Doby	Hitting for the cycle July 11, 1954	Succeeded by Lee Walls
