= Don Liddle =

American baseball player (1925–2000)

- Pitcher
- Born: May 25, 1925; Mount Carmel, Illinois, U.S.
- Died: June 5, 2000 (aged 75); Mount Carmel, Illinois, U.S.
- Batted: Left Threw: Left

MLB debut
- April 17, 1953, for the Milwaukee Braves

Last MLB appearance
- September 19, 1956, for the St. Louis Cardinals

MLB statistics
- Win–loss record: 28–18
- Earned run average: 3.75
- Strikeouts: 198
- Stats at Baseball Reference

Teams
- Milwaukee Braves (1953); New York Giants (1954–1956); St. Louis Cardinals (1956)

Career highlights and awards
- World Series champion (1954); As a starting pitcher, won decisive Game 4 of the 1954 World Series

Donald Eugene Liddle (May 25, 1925 – June 5, 2000) was an American left-handed pitcher in professional baseball who played four seasons in the Major Leagues for the Milwaukee Braves, New York Giants and St. Louis Cardinals from 1953 through 1956. Born in Mount Carmel, Illinois, he batted left-handed, stood 5 feet 10 inches (1.78 m) tall and weighed 165 pounds (75 kg).

Liddle is most remembered as the man who, in Game 1 of the 1954 World Series, threw the pitch to Vic Wertz that resulted in The Catch — Giant center fielder Willie Mays' historic back-to-home-plate, over-the-shoulder grab of Wertz' long drive with two men on base in the deepest part of center field at the Giants' home field, the Polo Grounds. Had the ball fallen safely, the opposition Cleveland Indians would have taken the lead 4–2 late in the game. But Mays' catch preserved a 2–2 tie, the Giants won the game in extra innings, and swept the Series in four straight contests.

Wertz was the only batter Liddle faced that day. Reportedly, he commented after the game was over in the locker room, "Well, I got my man", joking about his good fortune and Mays' athletic performance. Liddle later started and won the decisive Game 4 in Cleveland, pitching 6 2/3 innings and giving up only one earned run.

Earlier in 1954, Liddle was part of a pivotal, five-player trade, coming to the Giants with fellow left-handed pitcher Johnny Antonelli from the Braves in exchange for 1951 playoff hero Bobby Thomson. Antonelli won 21 games for the 1954 Giants, leading them to the National League pennant, and topped the Senior Circuit in earned run average.

Liddle appeared in 117 Major League games played, 54 as a starting pitcher. In 427 2/3 innings, he gave up 397 hits and 203 bases on balls, striking out 198. He retired from baseball after the 1957 season, which he spent in minor league baseball.

Liddle died, aged 75, in his hometown of Mount Carmel, Illinois.
