= 1954 Major League Baseball season =

1954 MLB season
- League: American League (AL); National League (NL)
- Sport: Baseball
- Duration: Regular season: April 13 – September 26, 1954; World Series: September 29 – October 2, 1954
- Games: 154
- Teams: 16 (8 per league)
- TV partner(s): ABC, NBC

Regular season
- Season MVP: AL: Yogi Berra (NYY); NL: Willie Mays (NYG)
- AL champions: Cleveland Indians
- AL runners-up: New York Yankees
- NL champions: New York Giants
- NL runners-up: Brooklyn Dodgers

World Series
- Champions: New York Giants
- Runners-up: Cleveland Indians
- Finals MVP: Dusty Rhodes (NYG)

MLB seasons
- ← 1953 1955 →

Locations of teams for the 1954 American League season
American League
Locations of teams for the 1953–1957 National League seasons
National League

The 1954 major league baseball season began on April 13, 1954. The regular season ended on September 26, with the New York Giants and Cleveland Indians as the regular season champions of the National League and American League, respectively. The postseason began with Game 1 of the 51st World Series on September 29 and ended with Game 4 on October 2. The Giants swept the Indians in four games, capturing their fifth championship in franchise history, since their previous in 1933. Going into the season, the defending World Series champions were the New York Yankees from the 1953 season.

The 21st All-Star Game was held on July 13 at Cleveland Stadium in Cleveland, Ohio, home of the Cleveland Indians. The American League won, 11–9, ending the National League's four-win streak.

In a continuation of the relocation trend that began the previous season, the St. Louis Browns moved from St. Louis, Missouri to Baltimore, Maryland, leaving St. Louis a one-team city, and seeing the return of American League baseball to Baltimore after 52 seasons. The previous American League relocation involved the same franchise, when the Milwaukee Brewers moved to St. Louis as the Browns, 53 seasons earlier. The season would also prove to be the last season of the Athletics franchise in Philadelphia, moving to Kansas City, Missouri the following season as the Kansas City Athletics.

During the 1953 Winter Meetings, the National League relaxed requirements for relocation, changing the necessary votes from unanimous between the eight teams to 75% (effectively six). This eased the eventual relocation of the Giants and Dodgers to California in 1958.

On Opening Day, April 13, the Pittsburgh Pirates (Note: Major League Baseball recognizes Curt Roberts as the Pirates' first Black player; however, Carlos Bernier of Puerto Rico, also a Black man, debuted on April 22, 1953.) and St. Louis Cardinals became the ninth and tenth teams in professional baseball to break the color line when they fielded Curt Roberts and Tom Alston, respectively; the Cincinnati Redlegs became the 11th team just four days later when they fielded future Nino Escalera and Chuck Harmon, while the Washington Senators became the 12th team on September 6 when they fielded Carlos Paula.

== Schedule ==
The 1954 schedule consisted of 154 games for all teams in the American League and National League, each of which had eight teams. Each team was scheduled to play 22 games against the other seven teams of their respective league. This continued the format put in place since the 1904 season (except for 1919) and would be used until 1961 in the American League and 1962 in the National League.

Opening Day took place on April 13, featuring all sixteen teams, the first time since 1950. The final day of the regular season was on September 26, which saw fourteen teams play, and was the first time since 1945 that the scheduled regular season didn't end with all sixteen teams. The World Series took place between September 29 and October 2.

== Rule changes ==
The 1954 season saw the following rule changes:

- During half innings where a team was batting, all players of that team must remove their gloves from the field. In addition, any equipment not on a player was to be removed from the field.
- Rules regarding a defensive interference offense expanded to include all fielders on the field, not just changed from a catcher.
- Fielders who were in the batter's vision could no longer deliberately distract the batter.
- The sacrifice fly rule was brought back, having been previously used in 1939. This time, the rule was considered when a player scored after the catch only. Sacrifice bunts and flies were listed separately in official averages.
- Both leagues banned twilight-night doubleheaders and Spring night games.
- The American League banned night games on getaway days if either team had to play the next afternoon.
- If a balk occurs, and a batter hits the pitch on said balk call, the manager can choose between the two outcomes, either the balk, or the result of the results of the play by the batter hitting the ball in play.

== Teams ==
League	Team	City	Ballpark	Capacity	Manager
American League	Baltimore Orioles	Baltimore, Maryland	Baltimore Memorial Stadium	47,866	Jimmy Dykes
American League	Boston Red Sox	Boston, Massachusetts	Fenway Park	34,824	Lou Boudreau
American League	Chicago White Sox	Chicago, Illinois	Comiskey Park	46,550	Paul Richards
American League	Chicago White Sox	Chicago, Illinois	Comiskey Park	46,550	Marty Marion
American League	Cleveland Indians	Cleveland, Ohio	Cleveland Stadium	73,811	Al López
American League	Detroit Tigers	Detroit, Michigan	Briggs Stadium	58,000	Fred Hutchinson
American League	New York Yankees	New York, New York	Yankee Stadium	67,000	Casey Stengel
American League	Philadelphia Athletics	Philadelphia, Pennsylvania	Connie Mack Stadium	33,166	Eddie Joost
American League	Washington Senators	Washington, D.C.	Griffith Stadium	29,023	Bucky Harris
National League	Brooklyn Dodgers	New York, New York	Ebbets Field	32,111	Walter Alston
National League	Chicago Cubs	Chicago, Illinois	Wrigley Field	36,755	Stan Hack
National League	Cincinnati Redlegs	Cincinnati, Ohio	Crosley Field	29,439	Birdie Tebbetts
National League	Milwaukee Braves	Milwaukee, Wisconsin	Milwaukee County Stadium	44,091	Charlie Grimm
National League	New York Giants	New York, New York	Polo Grounds	54,500	Leo Durocher
National League	Philadelphia Phillies	Philadelphia, Pennsylvania	Connie Mack Stadium	33,166	Steve O'Neill
National League	Philadelphia Phillies	Philadelphia, Pennsylvania	Connie Mack Stadium	33,166	Terry Moore
National League	Pittsburgh Pirates	Pittsburgh, Pennsylvania	Forbes Field	34,249	Fred Haney
National League	St. Louis Cardinals	St. Louis, Missouri	Busch Stadium	30,500	Eddie Stanky

== Standings ==
=== American League ===
American League
Team	W	L	Pct.	GB	Home	Road
Cleveland Indians	111	43	.721	—	59‍–‍18	52‍–‍25
New York Yankees	103	51	.669	8	54‍–‍23	49‍–‍28
Chicago White Sox	94	60	.610	17	45‍–‍32	49‍–‍28
Boston Red Sox	69	85	.448	42	38‍–‍39	31‍–‍46
Detroit Tigers	68	86	.442	43	35‍–‍42	33‍–‍44
Washington Senators	66	88	.429	45	37‍–‍41	29‍–‍47
Baltimore Orioles	54	100	.351	57	32‍–‍45	22‍–‍55
Philadelphia Athletics	51	103	.331	60	29‍–‍47	22‍–‍56

=== National League ===
National League
Team	W	L	Pct.	GB	Home	Road
New York Giants	97	57	.630	—	53‍–‍23	44‍–‍34
Brooklyn Dodgers	92	62	.597	5	45‍–‍32	47‍–‍30
Milwaukee Braves	89	65	.578	8	43‍–‍34	46‍–‍31
Philadelphia Phillies	75	79	.487	22	39‍–‍39	36‍–‍40
Cincinnati Redlegs	74	80	.481	23	41‍–‍36	33‍–‍44
St. Louis Cardinals	72	82	.468	25	33‍–‍44	39‍–‍38
Chicago Cubs	64	90	.416	33	40‍–‍37	24‍–‍53
Pittsburgh Pirates	53	101	.344	44	31‍–‍46	22‍–‍55

=== Tie games ===
5 tie games (5 in AL, 0 in NL), which are not factored into winning percentage or games behind (and were often replayed again) occurred throughout the season.

==== American League ====
The Boston Red Sox, Cleveland Indians, and Philadelphia Athletics had two tie games each, while the Chicago White Sox, Detroit Tigers, New York Yankees, and Washington Senators each had one each.

- May 9 (game 2), Detroit Tigers vs. Chicago White Sox, scoreless tie after 10 innings on account of darkness.
- May 9 (game 2), Philadelphia Athletics vs. New York Yankees, tied at 1 after nine innings on account of darkness.
- July 20, Cleveland Indians vs. Boston Red Sox, tied at 5 after 16 innings at 12:57 a.m. due to curfew.
- July 21, Cleveland Indians vs. Boston Red Sox, tied at 7 after a shortened game of eight innings due to rain.
- August 22 (game 2), Washington Senators vs. Philadelphia Athletics, tied at 4 after nine innings due to curfew.

== Postseason ==
The postseason began on September 29 and ended on October 2 with the New York Giants sweeping the Cleveland Indians in the 1954 World Series in four games.

=== Bracket ===
World Series
AL	Cleveland Indians	0
NL	New York Giants	4

== Managerial changes ==
=== Off-season ===
Team	Former Manager	New Manager
Baltimore Orioles	Marty Marion (St. Louis Browns)	Jimmy Dykes
Brooklyn Dodgers	Chuck Dressen	Walter Alston
Chicago Cubs	Phil Cavarretta	Stan Hack
Cincinnati Redlegs	Buster Mills	Birdie Tebbetts
Philadelphia Athletics	Jimmy Dykes	Eddie Joost

=== In-season ===
Team	Former Manager	New Manager
Chicago White Sox	Paul Richards	Marty Marion
Philadelphia Phillies	Steve O'Neill	Terry Moore

== League leaders ==
=== American League ===
Hitting leaders
Stat	Player	Total
AVG	Bobby Ávila (CLE)	.341
OPS	Ted Williams (BOS)	1.148
HR	Larry Doby (CLE)	32
RBI	Larry Doby (CLE)	126
R	Mickey Mantle (NYY)	129
H	Nellie Fox (CWS); Harvey Kuenn (DET)	201
SB	Jackie Jensen (BOS)	22

Pitching leaders
Stat	Player	Total
W	Bob Lemon (CLE); Early Wynn (CLE)	23
L	Don Larsen (BAL)	21
ERA	Mike Garcia (CLE)	2.64
K	Bob Turley (BAL)	185
IP	Early Wynn (CLE)	270.2
SV	Johnny Sain (NYY)	26
WHIP	Mike Garcia (CLE)	1.125

=== National League ===
Hitting leaders
Stat	Player	Total
AVG	Willie Mays (NYG)	.345
OPS	Willie Mays (NYG)	1.078
HR	Ted Kluszewski (CIN)	49
RBI	Ted Kluszewski (CIN)	141
R	Stan Musial (STL); Duke Snider (BRO)	120
H	Don Mueller (NYG)	212
SB	Bill Bruton (MIL)	34

Pitching leaders
Stat	Player	Total
W	Robin Roberts (PHI)	23
L	Murry Dickson (PHI)	20
ERA	Johnny Antonelli (NYG)	2.30
K	Robin Roberts (PHI)	185
IP	Robin Roberts (PHI)	336.2
SV	Jim Hughes (BRO)	24
WHIP	Robin Roberts (PHI)	1.025

== Milestones ==
=== Batters ===
==== Four home runs in one game ====
- Joe Adcock (MIL):
  - Became the seventh player and second in franchise history to hit four home runs in one game in a 15–7 win against the Brooklyn Dodgers on July 31.

==== Cycles ====
- Don Mueller (NYG):
  - Mueller hit for his first cycle and 13th in franchise history, in game one of a doubleheader on July 11 against the Pittsburgh Pirates.

=== Pitchers ===
==== No-hitters ====
- Jim Wilson (MIL):
  - Wilson threw his first career no-hitter and eighth no-hitter in franchise history, by defeating the Philadelphia Phillies 2–0 on June 12. Wilson walked two and struck out six.

=== Miscellaneous ===
- Bill McGowan:
  - Set a Major League record by officiating in his 2,541st consecutive game.

== Awards and honors ==
=== Regular season ===
Baseball Writers' Association of America Awards
BBWAA Award	National League	American League
Rookie of the Year	Wally Moon (STL)	Billy Martin (NYY)
Most Valuable Player	Willie Mays (NYG)	Yogi Berra (NYY)
Babe Ruth Award (World Series MVP)	Dusty Rhodes (NYG)	—

=== Other awards ===
The Sporting News Awards
Award	National League	American League
Player of the Year	Willie Mays (NYG)	—
Pitcher of the Year	Johnny Antonelli (NYG)	Bob Lemon (CLE)
Rookie of the Year	Wally Moon (STL)	Bob Grim (NYY)
Manager of the Year	Leo Durocher (NYG)	—
Executive of the Year	Horace Stoneham (NYG)	—

=== Baseball Hall of Fame ===
- Rabbit Maranville
- Bill Dickey
- Bill Terry

== Home field attendance ==
Team name	Wins	%±	Home attendance	%±	Per game
Milwaukee Braves	89	−3.3%	2,131,388	16.7%	27,680
New York Yankees	103	4.0%	1,475,171	−4.1%	18,912
Cleveland Indians	111	20.7%	1,335,472	24.9%	17,344
Chicago White Sox	94	5.6%	1,231,629	3.4%	15,790
New York Giants	97	38.6%	1,155,067	42.3%	15,198
Detroit Tigers	68	13.3%	1,079,847	22.1%	14,024
Baltimore Orioles	54	0.0%	1,060,910	256.9%	13,778
St. Louis Cardinals	72	−13.3%	1,039,698	18.1%	13,503
Brooklyn Dodgers	92	−12.4%	1,020,531	−12.3%	13,254
Boston Red Sox	69	−17.9%	931,127	−9.3%	11,786
Chicago Cubs	64	−1.5%	748,183	−2.0%	9,717
Philadelphia Phillies	75	−9.6%	738,991	−13.4%	9,474
Cincinnati Redlegs	74	8.8%	704,167	28.5%	9,145
Washington Senators	66	−13.2%	503,542	−15.5%	6,456
Pittsburgh Pirates	53	6.0%	475,494	−17.0%	6,175
Philadelphia Athletics	51	−13.6%	304,666	−15.9%	3,957

== Venues ==
With the relocation of the St. Louis Browns from St. Louis, Missouri to Baltimore, Maryland as the Baltimore Orioles, they leave Busch Stadium (where they played 52 seasons) and move into Baltimore Memorial Stadium. They would go on to play there for 38 seasons through 1991.

The Philadelphia Athletics would play their last game at Connie Mack Stadium on September 19 against the New York Yankees, relocating to Kansas City, Missouri at Municipal Stadium as the Kansas City Athletics for the start of the 1955 season.

== Media ==
=== Television ===
ABC aired the Saturday Game of the Week for the second consecutive year. The All-Star Game and World Series aired exclusively on NBC.

== Retired numbers ==
- Billy Meyer had his No. 1 retired by the Pittsburgh Pirates. This was the second number retired by the team.

== See also ==
- 1954 in baseball (Events, Births, Deaths)
- 1954 All-American Girls Professional Baseball League season
- 1954 Nippon Professional Baseball season
