= Los Molinos, California =

Los Molinos
- census-designated place
- Location in Tehama County and the state of California

- Location in the United States
- Coordinates: 40°1′28″N 122°5′58″W
- Country: United States
- State: California
- County: Tehama

Area
  - Total: 2.208 sq mi (5.718 km^{2})
  - Land: 2.176 sq mi (5.637 km^{2})
  - Water: 0.031 sq mi (0.081 km^{2}) 1.41%
- Elevation: 223 ft (68 m)

Population (2020)
  - Total: 2,098
  - Density: 964.0/sq mi (372.2/km^{2})
- Time zone: UTC-8 (Pacific (PST))
  - Summer (DST): UTC-7 (PDT)
- ZIP code: 96055
- Area code: 530
- FIPS code: 06-44140
- GNIS feature ID: 0277548

Los Molinos (Spanish for "The Mills") is a census-designated place (CDP) in Tehama County, California, United States. The population was 2,098 at the 2020 census, up from 2,037 at the 2010 census.

== History ==
Los Molinos ("the mills" in Spanish) traces its history back to a railroad station which opened at the site in 1905. A post office has been in operation at Los Molinos since 1905.

== Geography ==
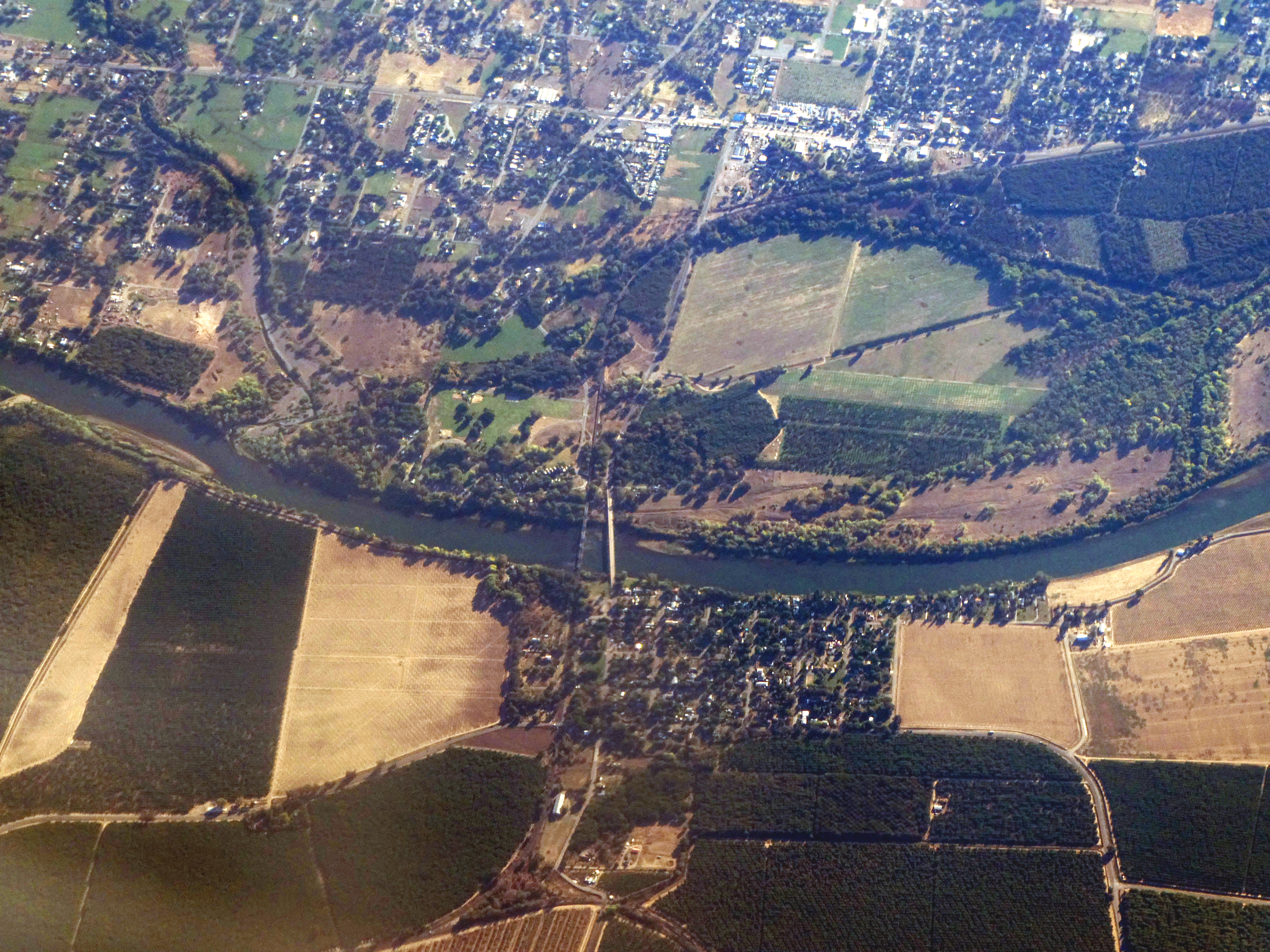
Aerial view of Los Molinos (top) and Tehama

Los Molinos is located at 40°1′28″N 122°5′58″W (40.024439, -122.099442).

According to the United States Census Bureau, the CDP has a total area of 2.2 square miles (5.7 km^{2}), of which 2.2 square miles (5.7 km^{2}) is land and 0.03 square miles (0.078 km^{2}) (1.41%) is water.

== Demographics ==
Historical population
Census	Pop.	Note	%±
1980	1,241		—
1990	1,709		37.7%
2000	1,952		14.2%
2010	2,037		4.4%
2020	2,098		3.0%
U.S. Decennial Census; 1860–1870 1880-1890; 1900 1910 1920; 1930 1940 1950; 1960 1970 1980; 1990 2000 2010

Los Molinos first appeared as a census designated place in the 1980 United States census.

=== 2020 census ===
As of the 2020 census, Los Molinos had a population of 2,098 and a population density of 964.2 inhabitants per square mile (372.3/km^{2}).

Racial composition as of the 2020 census
Race	Number	Percent
White	1,417	67.5%
Black or African American	11	0.5%
American Indian and Alaska Native	63	3.0%
Asian	17	0.8%
Native Hawaiian and Other Pacific Islander	2	0.1%
Some other race	291	13.9%
Two or more races	297	14.2%
Hispanic or Latino (of any race)	617	29.4%

The census reported that 2,082 people (99.2% of the population) lived in households, 16 (0.8%) lived in non-institutionalized group quarters, and no one was institutionalized. There were 819 households, out of which 221 (27.0%) had children under the age of 18 living in them. Of all households, 333 (40.7%) were married-couple households, 57 (7.0%) were cohabiting couple households, 190 (23.2%) had a male householder with no spouse or partner present, and 239 (29.2%) had a female householder with no spouse or partner present. About 269 households (32.8%) were one person, and 152 (18.6%) had someone living alone who was 65 years of age or older. The average household size was 2.54, and there were 485 families (59.2% of all households).

The age distribution was 487 people (23.2%) under the age of 18, 138 people (6.6%) aged 18 to 24, 436 people (20.8%) aged 25 to 44, 588 people (28.0%) aged 45 to 64, and 449 people (21.4%) who were 65 years of age or older. The median age was 44.1 years. For every 100 females, there were 109.0 males, and for every 100 females age 18 and over there were 105.0 males age 18 and over.

There were 909 housing units at an average density of 417.7 units per square mile (161.3 units/km^{2}), of which 819 (90.1%) were occupied and 9.9% were vacant. Of the occupied units, 479 (58.5%) were owner-occupied and 340 (41.5%) were occupied by renters. The homeowner vacancy rate was 1.6% and the rental vacancy rate was 7.1%.

0.0% of residents lived in urban areas, while 100.0% lived in rural areas.

=== Income and poverty ===
In 2023, the US Census Bureau estimated that the median household income was $34,324, and the per capita income was $22,915. About 21.7% of families and 33.8% of the population were below the poverty line.

=== 2010 census ===
The 2010 United States census reported that Los Molinos had a population of 2,037. The population density was 918.6 inhabitants per square mile (354.7/km^{2}). The racial makeup of Los Molinos was 1,581 (77.6%) White, 0 (0.0%) African American, 39 (1.9%) Native American, 7 (0.3%) Asian, 2 (0.1%) Pacific Islander, 321 (15.8%) from other races, and 87 (4.3%) from two or more races. Hispanic or Latino of any race were 537 persons (26.4%).

The Census reported that 2,004 people (98.4% of the population) lived in households, 32 (1.6%) lived in non-institutionalized group quarters, and 1 (0%) were institutionalized.

There were 786 households, out of which 242 (30.8%) had children under the age of 18 living in them, 366 (46.6%) were opposite-sex married couples living together, 88 (11.2%) had a female householder with no husband present, 43 (5.5%) had a male householder with no wife present. There were 70 (8.9%) unmarried opposite-sex partnerships, and 1 (0.1%) same-sex married couples or partnerships. 232 households (29.5%) were made up of individuals, and 120 (15.3%) had someone living alone who was 65 years of age or older. The average household size was 2.55. There were 497 families (63.2% of all households); the average family size was 3.18.

The population was spread out, with 483 people (23.7%) under the age of 18, 146 people (7.2%) aged 18 to 24, 473 people (23.2%) aged 25 to 44, 573 people (28.1%) aged 45 to 64, and 362 people (17.8%) who were 65 years of age or older. The median age was 41.7 years. For every 100 females, there were 98.7 males. For every 100 females age 18 and over, there were 99.2 males.

There were 932 housing units at an average density of 420.3 per square mile (162.3/km^{2}), of which 487 (62.0%) were owner-occupied, and 299 (38.0%) were occupied by renters. The homeowner vacancy rate was 3.7%; the rental vacancy rate was 17.6%. 1,225 people (60.1% of the population) lived in owner-occupied housing units and 779 people (38.2%) lived in rental housing units.

== Politics ==
In the state legislature Los Molinos is in the 1st senatorial district, represented by Republican Megan Dahle, and in the 3rd Assembly district, represented by Vacant.

Federally, Los Molinos is in California's 1st congressional district, represented by Republican James Gallagher.

== Notable people ==
- Marv Grissom, Major League Baseball pitcher
- Leo Gorcey, Hollywood Actor, resident from 1956 to 1964, is buried at Molinos Cemetery.
