= 1954 World Series =

1954 Major League Baseball championship series

- Willie Mays' memorable catch in Game 1
Team (Wins)	Managers	Season
New York Giants (4)	Leo Durocher	97–57 (.630), GA: 5
Cleveland Indians (0)	Al López	111–43 (.721), GA: 8
- Dates: September 29 – October 2
- Venue(s): Polo Grounds (New York); Cleveland Stadium (Cleveland)
- Umpires: Al Barlick (NL), Charlie Berry (AL), Jocko Conlan (NL), Johnny Stevens (AL), Lon Warneke (NL: outfield only), Larry Napp (AL: outfield only)
- Hall of Famers: Umpires: Al Barlick; Jocko Conlan; Giants: Leo Durocher (manager); Monte Irvin; Willie Mays; Hoyt Wilhelm; Indians: Al López (manager); Larry Doby; Bob Lemon; Early Wynn; Hal Newhouser; Bob Feller

Broadcast
- Television: NBC
- TV announcers: Russ Hodges and Jack Brickhouse
- Radio: Mutual
- Radio announcers: Al Helfer and Jimmy Dudley

The 1954 World Series was the championship series of Major League Baseball's (MLB) 1954 season. The 51st edition of the World Series, it was a best-of-seven playoff that matched the National League (NL) champion New York Giants against the American League (AL) champion Cleveland Indians. The Giants swept the Series in four games to win their first championship since 1933, defeating the heavily favored Indians, who had won an AL-record 111 games in the 154-game regular season (a record since broken by the 1998 New York Yankees with 114 and again by the 2001 Seattle Mariners with 116).

"The Catch" occurred during Game 1 of this series, when Giants center fielder Willie Mays snared a long drive by Vic Wertz near the outfield wall with his back to the infield. Utility player Dusty Rhodes had clutch hits in three of the four games, including a pinch-hit walk-off that won Game 1, barely clearing the 258-foot (79 m) right-field fence at the Polo Grounds. Giants manager Leo Durocher, who had managed teams to three National League championships, won his only World Series title as a manager. The Giants, who moved west to San Francisco in 1958, did not win another World Series until 2010.

This was the first time that the Indians had been swept in a World Series and the first time that the Giants had swept an opponent in four games (their 1922 sweep included a controversial tie game). Game 2 was the last World Series and playoff game at the Polo Grounds, and Game 4 was the last World Series and postseason game ever played at Cleveland Municipal Stadium. The Indians' next World Series was in 1995, a year after Jacobs Field opened.

The National Football League game between the Cleveland Browns and Detroit Lions, scheduled for October 3 at Cleveland Stadium, was postponed to December 19.

This was the first World Series since 1948 to not feature the Yankees and one of only three World Series to not feature them over 18 seasons from 1947 to 1964 (also 1959).

== Background ==
The Indians, by winning the American League pennant, kept the Yankees from having a chance to win their sixth straight series. The last time the Yankees had been absent from the World Series was 1948, when the Indians defeated the Boston Braves to win the championship. This was also the only World Series from 1949 to 1958 in which the Yankees did not participate.

The Indians easily won the 1954 pennant on the strength of the American League's top pitching staff, leading the AL in team earned run average at 2.72 and complete games with 77. Pitchers Early Wynn (23–11, 2.73 earned run average) and Bob Lemon (23–7, 2.72 earned run average) were in top form, with solid contributions from Mike Garcia (19–8, 2.64) and Art Houtterman (15–7, 3.35). Bob Feller, at age 35, could make only 19 starts, and finished at 13–3. Cleveland also had potent hitting, leading the AL in home runs (156) and finishing second in runs scored (746), although the team managed just 30 stolen bases in 63 attempts. Bobby Ávila led the offense with 112 runs and a .341 batting average, while Larry Doby (.272 batting average, 32 home runs, 126 runs batted in) and Al Rosen (.300 batting average, 24 home runs, 102 runs batted in) provided the power. Catcher Jim Hegan made only four errors in 134 games and threw out 44% of would-be base stealers.

The Giants entered the World Series with a top-flight pitching staff as well, with Johnny Antonelli (21–7, 2.30 earned run average), Rubén Gómez (17–9, 2.88) and 37-year-old Sal "The Barber" Maglie (14–6, 3.26). The Giants relied more heavily on relief pitching with Hoyt Wilhelm (12–7, 2.10, 7 saves) and Marv Grissom (10–7, 2.35, 19 saves) rounding out a staff that led the NL in team earned run average at 3.09 and shutouts with 17. Manager Leo Durocher used a solid, consistent lineup with all of his starters, except for the catching position, playing in at least 135 games. Willie Mays (.345 batting average, 41 home runs, 110 runs batted in) led an offense that also featured Don Mueller (.342 batting average), Alvin Dark (.293 batting average, 98 runs), Hank Thompson (26 home runs, 86 runs batted in) and pinch-hitter extraordinaire Dusty Rhodes (.341 batting average).

== Summary ==
NL New York Giants (4) vs. AL Cleveland Indians (0)

Game	Date	Score	Location	Time	Attendance
1	September 29	Cleveland Indians – 2, New York Giants – 5 (10)	Polo Grounds	3:11	52,751
2	September 30	Cleveland Indians – 1, New York Giants – 3	Polo Grounds	2:50	49,099
3	October 1	New York Giants – 6, Cleveland Indians – 2	Cleveland Municipal Stadium	2:28	71,555
4	October 2	New York Giants – 7, Cleveland Indians – 4	Cleveland Municipal Stadium	2:52	78,102

== Matchups ==
=== Game 1 ===
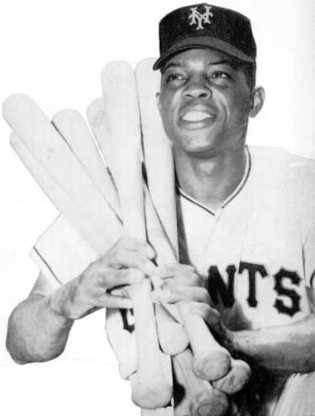
Willie Mays

September 29, 1954 1:00 pm (ET) at Polo Grounds in Manhattan, New York
Team	1	2	3	4	5	6	7	8	9	10	R	H	E
Cleveland	2	0	0	0	0	0	0	0	0	0	2	8	0
New York	0	0	2	0	0	0	0	0	0	3	5	9	3
WP: Marv Grissom (1–0) LP: Bob Lemon (0–1); Home runs: CLE: None; NYG: Dusty Rhodes (1); Notes: Ceremonial first pitch: Jim Barbieri

Cleveland got on the board right away against Sal Maglie. Leadoff man Al Smith was hit by a pitch, Bobby Ávila singled and Vic Wertz brought home both with a triple to right. Don Liddle and Marv Grissom held them scoreless for the rest of the game.

Bob Lemon gave two back in the third on singles by Whitey Lockman and Alvin Dark, a run-scoring groundout by Don Mueller, a walk to Willie Mays and a Hank Thompson run-scoring single.

Mays saved the day in the eighth after leadoff singles by Larry Doby and Al Rosen led to starting pitcher Maglie being lifted for Liddle. Wertz's drive to deep center field would have scored both if not for Mays' memorable catch.

Wertz opened the 10th inning with another hard-hit ball in Mays’ direction, which again would have required a great defensive play by the Giants' centerfielder but landed for a double. (Wertz thus ended his afternoon having gone 4-for-5 with three extra-base hits and batting in the Indians’ two runs.) However, this potential 10th-inning rally was to no avail, as the Indians batted only 1-for-16 with runners in scoring position in the game, and went hitless (0-for-13) in such situations after Wertz’s two-run triple in the first inning.

Lemon went all the way for Cleveland, losing it in the 10th when Dusty Rhodes, pinch-hitting for Monte Irvin with two Giants on base, hit a walk-off home run.

=== Game 2 ===
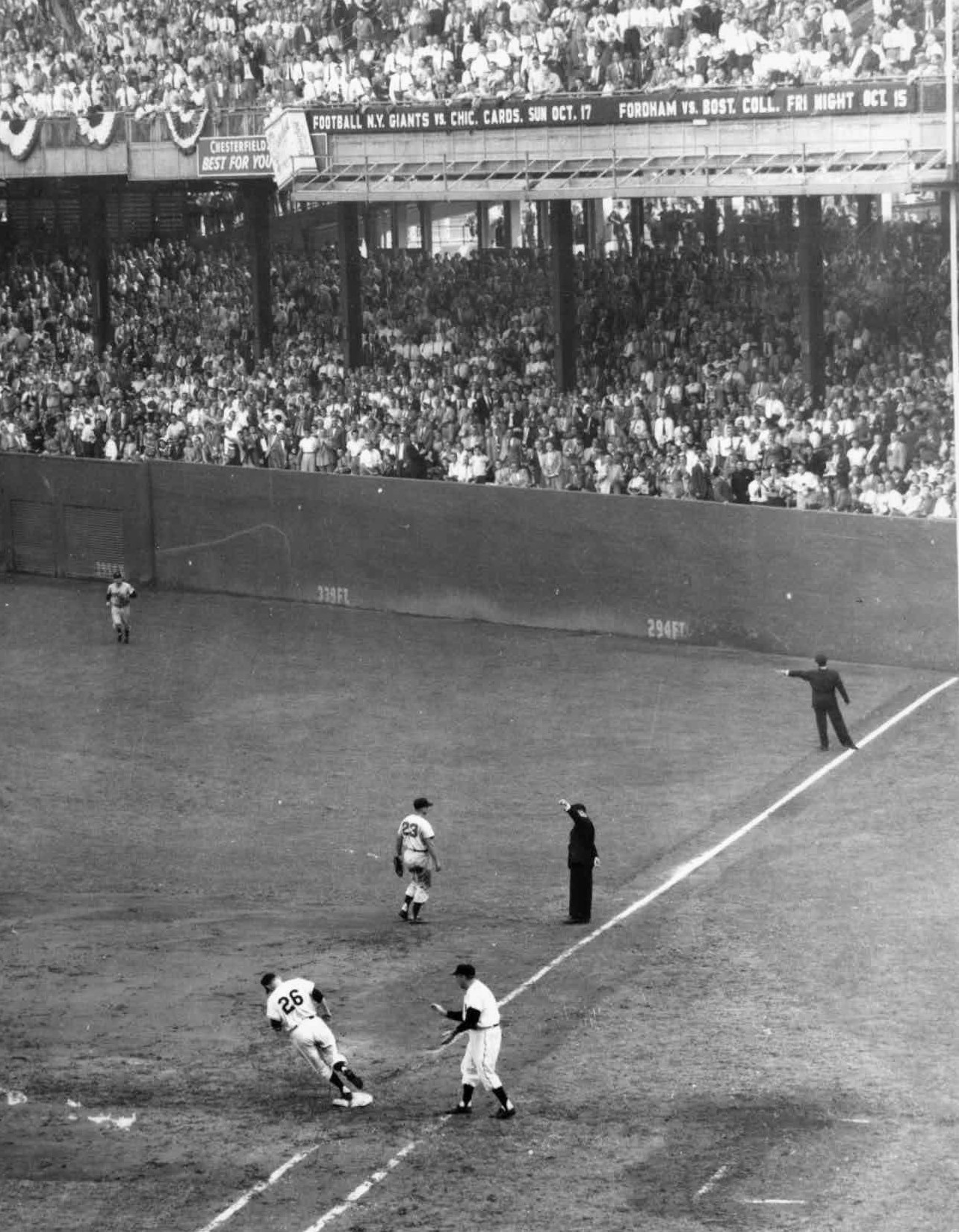
Dusty Rhodes rounds first base after hitting a home run during the 7th inning

September 30, 1954 1:00 pm (ET) at Polo Grounds in Manhattan, New York
Team	1	2	3	4	5	6	7	8	9	R	H	E
Cleveland	1	0	0	0	0	0	0	0	0	1	8	0
New York	0	0	0	0	2	0	1	0	X	3	4	0
WP: Johnny Antonelli (1–0) LP: Early Wynn (0–1); Home runs: CLE: Al Smith (1); NYG: Dusty Rhodes (2)

Once again, the visitors started quickly but could not hold their lead. Al Smith's leadoff home run off Johnny Antonelli put Cleveland up 1–0. Early Wynn preserved that lead, pitching four perfect innings, but in the fifth inning, Willie Mays walked and Hank Thompson singled, and Dusty Rhodes, again pinch-hitting for Monte Irvin, delivered a run-scoring single. Antonelli gave himself the go-ahead run by scoring Thompson on a groundout. New York had just four hits, but Rhodes padded the Giants' lead with a home run leading off the seventh. Their other hit came in the sixth inning on an Alvin Dark leadoff single. Antonelli walked six but struck out nine, pitching a complete game to give the Giants a 2–0 series lead. This was the last postseason game at the Polo Grounds.

=== Game 3 ===
October 1, 1954 1:00 pm (ET) at Cleveland Municipal Stadium in Cleveland, Ohio
Team	1	2	3	4	5	6	7	8	9	R	H	E
New York	1	0	3	0	1	1	0	0	0	6	10	1
Cleveland	0	0	0	0	0	0	1	1	0	2	4	2
WP: Ruben Gomez (1–0) LP: Mike Garcia (0–1) Sv: Hoyt Wilhelm (1); Home runs: NYG: None; CLE: Vic Wertz (1)

A huge crowd of 71,555 hoped to see Cleveland get its first win, but things did not go well for the home team. The Indians trailed 1–0 quickly when Whitey Lockman singled, took second on a groundout and scored on a hit by Willie Mays. The run was scored as unearned because of an error by shortstop George Strickland. With the bases loaded in the third, pinch hitter Dusty Rhodes hit a two-run single. An error by pitcher Mike Garcia on Davey Williams' bunt attempt gave the Giants another run to make it 4–0. The Giants added to their lead on run-scoring singles by Wes Westrum off of Art Houtteman in the fifth and by Mays off of Ray Narleski in the sixth. Ruben Gomez gave up just four hits and two runs (a Vic Wertz home run in the seventh and an error by shortstop Alvin Dark on a ground ball by Al Smith), with knuckleballer Hoyt Wilhelm mopping up for the save.

=== Game 4 ===
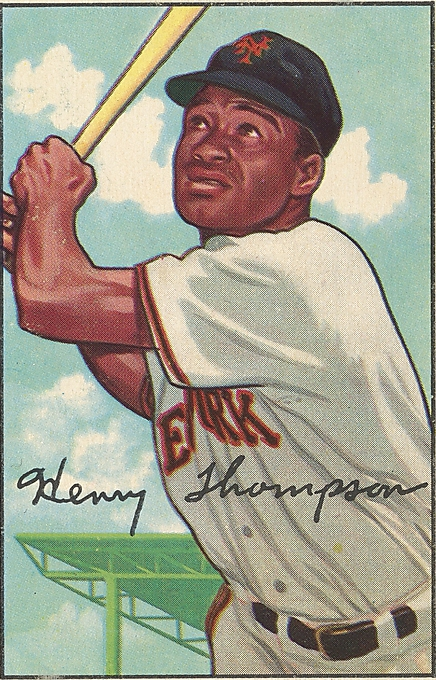
Hank Thompson set a World Series record for bases on balls with 7 in the Series

October 2, 1954 1:00 pm (ET) at Cleveland Municipal Stadium in Cleveland, Ohio
Team	1	2	3	4	5	6	7	8	9	R	H	E
New York	0	2	1	0	4	0	0	0	0	7	10	3
Cleveland	0	0	0	0	3	0	1	0	0	4	6	2
WP: Don Liddle (1–0) LP: Bob Lemon (0–2) Sv: Johnny Antonelli (1); Home runs: NYG: None; CLE: Hank Majeski (1)

Cleveland's slim comeback chances took a beating as the Indians fell hopelessly behind, 7–0. The scoring started on a pair of Cleveland errors in the second inning. A run-scoring double by Mays in the third scored another run. The Giants' four-run fifth inning broke the game wide open. Starter Bob Lemon loaded the bases and was pulled for Hal Newhouser, who faced just two batters, giving up a walk to Thompson and two-run single to Irvin. The Giants added another run in the inning on Wes Westrum's sacrifice fly against Ray Narleski. A brief glimmer of hope for the home team came in the bottom of the fifth with a couple of Giants errors and a Hank Majeski three-run pinch-hit home run, but except for a meaningless run-scoring single by Rudy Regalado in the seventh off starter Don Liddle, the Indians got nothing more as Hoyt Wilhelm and Game 2 starter Johnny Antonelli came on in relief and the Giants completed a four-game sweep. It was the most unexpected sweep in World Series history, and one of the most unexpected upsets in World Series history, with the Indians having a better regular reason record by 14 games. The only other similar discrepancies in a World Series upset were the Cincinnati Reds in 1990 (who swept an Oakland Athletics team whose regular season record bested theirs by 12 games), the Washington Nationals in 2019 (who defeated a Houston Astros team in seven games whose regular season record bested theirs by 14 games as well), and the Chicago White Sox in 1906 (who defeated a 116-win Chicago Cubs team in six games whose record bested theirs by a staggering 23 games). This was also the last World Series before the official World Series MVP award began to be awarded in 1955, though Dusty Rhodes would have been a lock for the award if it had been introduced yet. The Giants also became only the second non-Yankees team ever to sweep a four-game World Series, joining the Boston Braves in 1914.

== Composite box ==
1954 World Series (4–0): New York Giants (N.L.) over Cleveland Indians (A.L.)

Team	1	2	3	4	5	6	7	8	9	10	R	H	E
New York Giants	1	2	6	0	7	1	1	0	0	3	21	33	7
Cleveland Indians	3	0	0	0	3	0	2	1	0	0	9	26	4
Total attendance: 251,507 Average attendance: 62,877; Winning player's share: $11,148 Losing player's share: $6,713

== Aftermath ==
This was the first of what is currently four consecutive defeats in the World Series for the Indians. After the series loss, the Indians fell into a massive slump, and as the Major League Baseball postseason playoff format made its debut in 1969, they would fail to make the postseason during the entirety of the four-team era from 1969 to 1993 when only division winners qualified for the postseason. They would not return to the postseason until the field was expanded in 1995 to four teams per league, and that season the Indians would make it back to the World Series, but were upset by the Atlanta Braves in six games, which was their second consecutive defeat in the Fall Classic. They also returned in 1997, and lost to the Florida Marlins in seven games after being an out away from the championship in Game 7. Then came the 2016 World Series, which the Indians blew a 3–1 series lead and lost in seven games to the Chicago Cubs, who won their first title in 108 years, which was the Indians’ fourth consecutive loss in the Fall Classic and they now hold the longest championship drought in the majors. The only team in North American sports with a longer championship drought are the NFL’s Arizona Cardinals, who last won a championship in 1947 (as the Chicago Cardinals), a year before Cleveland’s last World Series victory.

As for the Giants, they too would eventually fall into a slump after their World Series win and be saddled with the Curse of Coogan's Bluff after their move to San Francisco. However, the Giants would have much better luck than the Indians during this time. They would return to Fall Classic in 1962, but narrowly lost to the New York Yankees in seven games. They also returned in 1989, but were swept by their cross-town rival in the Oakland Athletics. Then, they would suffer a third straight defeat in 2002 against their cross-state foe in the Anaheim Angels in seven games after being six outs away from the championship in Game 6. They would eventually end the curse in 2010 over the Texas Rangers in five games, which marked the start of a dynasty for the Giants.

== Records ==
- Hank Thompson set a World Series record for bases on balls received during a four-game series with 7 and Bob Lemon set a World Series record for bases on balls given up during a four-game series with 8.

== See also ==
- 1954 Japan Series
- List of World Series sweeps
- The Catch
