= Bob Lemon =

American baseball player and manager (1920–2000)

- Lemon in 1947
- Pitcher / Manager
- Born: September 22, 1920; San Bernardino, California, U.S.
- Died: January 11, 2000 (aged 79); Long Beach, California, U.S.
- Batted: Left Threw: Right

MLB debut
- September 9, 1941, for the Cleveland Indians

Last MLB appearance
- July 1, 1958, for the Cleveland Indians

MLB statistics
- Win–loss record: 207–128
- Earned run average: 3.23
- Strikeouts: 1,277
- Managerial record: 430–403
- Winning %: .516
- Stats at Baseball Reference
- Managerial record at Baseball Reference

Teams
- As player: Cleveland Indians (1941–1942, 1946–1958); As manager: Kansas City Royals (1970–1972); Chicago White Sox (1977–1978); New York Yankees (1978–1979, 1981–1982)

Career highlights and awards
- 7× All-Star (1948–1954); 2× World Series champion (1948, 1978); 3× AL wins leader (1950, 1954, 1955); AL strikeout leader (1950); Pitched a no-hitter on June 30, 1948; Cleveland Guardians No. 21 retired; Cleveland Guardians Hall of Fame

Member of the National

Baseball Hall of Fame
- Induction: 1976
- Vote: 78.6% (12th ballot)

Robert Granville Lemon (September 22, 1920 – January 11, 2000) was an American right-handed pitcher and manager in Major League Baseball (MLB). He was elected to the National Baseball Hall of Fame in 1976.

Lemon grew up in Long Beach, California where he played high school baseball and was the state player of the year in 1938. At the age of 17, he began a professional baseball career playing in the Cleveland Indians organization, with whom he played for his entire professional career. Lemon was called up to Cleveland's major league team as a utility player in 1941. He then joined the United States Navy during World War II returning to the Indians in 1946. That season was the first that Lemon was a pitcher.

The Indians played in the 1948 World Series and were helped by Lemon's two pitching wins as they won the club's first championship since 1920. In the early 1950s, Cleveland had a starting pitching rotation which included Lemon, Bob Feller, Mike Garcia and Early Wynn. During the 1954 season, Lemon had a career-best 23–7 win–loss record and the Indians set a 154-game season AL-record win mark when they won 111 games before they won the American League (AL) pennant. He was an All-Star for seven consecutive seasons and recorded seven seasons of 20 or more pitching wins in a nine-year period from 1948 to 1956.

Lemon was a manager with the Kansas City Royals, Chicago White Sox, and New York Yankees. He was named Manager of the Year with the White Sox and Yankees. In 1978, he was fired as manager of the White Sox. He was named Yankees manager one month later and he led the team to a 1978 World Series title and a 1981 American League Championship. Lemon became the first AL manager to win a World Series after assuming the managerial role in the middle of a season.

== Early life ==
Bob Lemon was born in San Bernardino, California. Later, Lemon's father, Earl Lemon, moved his ice business and the family to Long Beach, California, where Lemon attended Wilson Classical High School and played shortstop on the school's baseball team. He was recognized as the state baseball player of the year by the California Interscholastic Federation (CIF) Southern Section in 1938.

Later in the same year, at the age of 17, Lemon began his professional baseball career in the farm system of the Cleveland Indians as a member of the Oswego Netherlands of the Canadian–American League and later that year, the Middle Atlantic League's Springfield Indians. In 75 games with the Netherlands he recorded a .312 batting average. The following season he played 80 games with Springfield, and hit .293, and then joined the New Orleans Pelicans of the Southern Association, where Lemon hit .309. He spent the next two seasons at the Class A level with the Eastern League's Wilkes-Barre Barons as he hit .255 in 1940 and .301 in 1941. In his final stint in the minors, Lemon hit .268 with 21 home runs for the 1942 Baltimore Orioles of the International League.

== Major League career ==
=== Success as a utility player ===
Lemon's major league debut came as a third baseman as a late season call-up on September 9, 1941. He appeared in five games and collected one hit in five plate appearances. He was joined by catcher and fellow rookie Jim Hegan. He repeated the same number of games in the 1942 season and failed to record a hit. Lemon served in the United States Navy during World War II and missed the next three seasons. Before leaving for tour duty in 1943, Lemon married Jane McGee.

Lemon was the Indians' center fielder for Opening Day in 1946. On April 30, Indians pitcher Bob Feller no-hit the New York Yankees; Feller later wrote that Lemon's "daring catch" and "throwing to and doubling a man off second base" were key in "saving my" no-hitter. By season's end, however, Lemon had entered more games as a pitcher than a utility player. Before that season, Lemon had pitched only one inning while with Oswego and another while with Wilkes-Barre. Birdie Tebbetts of the Detroit Tigers and Johnny Pesky of the Boston Red Sox had played against Lemon in Navy baseball games, and they spoke to Indians player-manager Lou Boudreau about switching Lemon from the outfield to the pitching mound.

Boudreau discussed the potential move to pitcher with Yankees catcher Bill Dickey, who had also played in the Navy with Lemon. "I knew Lemon had a strong arm, and once I realized he was not going to hit with consistency as an outfielder, I thought it would be worthwhile to look at him as a pitcher," Boudreau later wrote. Lemon resisted the idea at first, but he agreed to the change after he learned that his salary could be higher as a pitcher. Lemon credited Indians coach Bill McKechnie with helping him to adjust to his new position. Indians pitching coach Mel Harder taught Lemon how to throw a slider, a key pitch in his repertoire. That same year, Indians owner Bill Veeck said that Lemon "some day will become the best pitcher in the American League". Lemon finished the 1946 season with a losing record (4–5), the only one he would have until 1957, and a career-low 2.49 ERA. He followed up his inaugural season as a pitcher with an 11–5 record. He appeared in 19 games before August, largely as a relief pitcher, but he made his first start in July against the Boston Red Sox. During the last two months of the season, Lemon went 9–3 and pitched six complete games, including two 11-inning outings.

=== Full-time pitcher to World Series champion ===
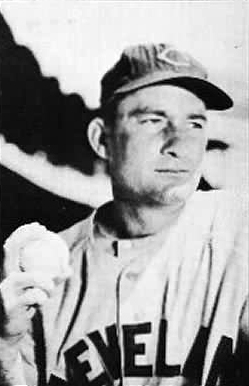
Lemon in 1953

Before the 1948 season started, team president Bill Veeck doubled Lemon's contract amount. In what would be his first full season as a pitcher, Lemon was the Indians' number-two pitcher in the starting rotation, behind Bob Feller. On June 30, 1948, Lemon pitched a no-hitter against the Detroit Tigers in a 2–0 win, becoming the ninth Indians pitcher to record a no-hitter and earning his 11th win and fifth shutout of the season. He ended his breakout season with an AL-best 20 complete games. His ten shutouts on the season were the most in the majors. Lemon would go on to win the 1948 AL Pitcher of the Year Award. With three games remaining in the regular season, 20-game winner Lemon started the first game of their final series against Detroit. Lemon allowed three runs on seven hits and the Indians lost the game. Cleveland lost two games of the three-game series, forcing a one-game playoff with the Boston Red Sox. Speculation built up around which Indians pitcher Boudreau would send to the mound against the Red Sox on October 4; the choices were largely narrowed down to Lemon and Satchel Paige. Lemon was listed as Cleveland's "probable pitcher" by United Press International in morning newspapers the day of the game, even though he would be working on two days of rest. Instead, Boudreau went with Gene Bearden, who would be pitching on one day of rest, and the choice was solidified when veteran second baseman Joe Gordon spoke up in support of Boudreau at a team meeting. The Indians won the game at Fenway Park by a score of 8–3 and prepared to face the Boston Braves in the World Series.

Boudreau started Feller in game one, which Cleveland lost. Lemon was the starter in the second game. Lemon faced Warren Spahn, and Cleveland won 4–1. Lemon was named the starter for game six in Boston with the Indians leading the series 3–2. He allowed three earned runs on eight hits and Cleveland had the lead when Lemon was replaced by Bearden. The Braves scored two runs in the bottom of the eighth inning but the Indians won the game, 4–3, to clinch the franchise's first World Series title since 1920. Lemon was the only pitcher from either club to win two games in the Series. He finished the Series with a 1.65 ERA.

Lemon's hitting skills began to get attention as well. By August 1949, Lemon was batting .295 with 11 extra-base hits and six home runs, prompting Yankees manager Casey Stengel to comment: "Well, I see where the Indians have nine hitters in the lineup instead of eight." UPI sportswriter Milton Richman wrote, "Lemon's fine work at the plate has also conspired to tire him more. When the Indians get behind and Lemon is pitching, he rarely is yanked for a pinch hitter in the early innings. It's a tough price he's paying for batting fame." In 1950, Lemon led the major leagues in wins (23) for the first time and won his second AL Pitcher of the Year Award. He pitched a six-hit complete game over the Detroit Tigers in his last start of the season on September 29. When Lemon signed a new contract before the 1951 season, the Indians made him the highest paid pitcher in baseball. At the beginning of the 1951 season, UPI sportswriter Oscar Fraley pointed out that Lemon was one of only 12 active pitchers who had earned a winning record in four consecutive seasons. He finished the season with a 3.52 ERA, lower than the 1950 season mark of 3.84 when he led the majors with 23 wins, and a 17–14 record. The loss total was the most in the AL. He did not record his first shutout of the season until well into August, when he earned a three-hit win over the Chicago White Sox. In 1952, Lemon recorded the second-lowest ERA of his career, 2.50, and went 22–11. His 28 complete games were a career-high and led the AL. Along with teammates Early Wynn (23), and Mike Garcia (22), Lemon gave Cleveland's starting rotation three 20-game winners.

On Opening Day of the 1953 season, Lemon pitched a one-hitter against the Chicago White Sox and earned a win. He finished the season with a 21–15 record, 3.36 ERA and led the AL in innings pitched for the fourth and final time of his career.

=== Second World Series appearance ===
In 1954, he was 23–7 and won his third AL Pitcher of the Year Award as Cleveland won the pennant. The Indians set an AL record with 111 wins. (The record stood until major league seasons were lengthened to 162 games, and it has been surpassed twice since then.) Lemon was named Cleveland's starter for game one of the 1954 World Series. After nine innings, the Indians and Giants were tied 2–2. Lemon stayed in the game to pitch the tenth and final inning, but he surrendered a three-run home run to pinch hitter Dusty Rhodes and the Indians lost, 5–2. Indians manager Al López went with Lemon again in the fourth game after only two days rest. "He hasn't worked that close together all year because we had a good bunch of other pitchers, but a year ago, he and Wynn and Garcia pitched every third day for practically a month. Bob will be all right," Lopez said. Lemon and the Indians lost the game, 7–4, as the Giants swept the Series four games to none. In his two appearances, he went 0–2 with a 6.75 ERA, allowed eight walks and recorded 11 strikeouts.

Lemon began the 1955 season with a 5–0 record in April, but he was the only Cleveland starting pitcher with a winning record that month. His 18 wins tied for the most in the AL that year. He recorded five complete games through May 30 but none after that date. Indians general manager Hank Greenberg got Lemon to agree to his first reduction in contract salary since joining the organization. Lemon earned his 200th career win against the Baltimore Orioles on September 11, 1956, and he also hit a home run that day. He finished the season with a 20–14 record, the last of his seven career 20-win seasons, and led the AL in complete games (21). On August 13, 1957, it was announced that Lemon would not finish the season due to continued irritation to his elbow after bone chips were found earlier in the season. Lemon ended the season with a record of 6–11, his first losing record since 1946.

In 1958, Lemon was the oldest Indian on the roster at age 37. Lemon pitched 3 1/3 innings over the span of two games before he was put on the Indians' disabled list and sent to the Triple-A San Diego Padres. There he continued physical conditioning and mentored the pitching staff of the Indians' top farm club. He appeared in 12 games with the Padres, going 2–5, with a 4.34 ERA, 22 walks, and 19 strikeouts. He returned to pitch for the Indians on May 25 in a relief role, but he appeared in only nine games that season. He earned just one decision that year, a loss, which brought his career pitching record to 207–128. The club put him on waivers in July.

=== Retirement ===
At 38, Lemon went to Tucson in 1959 to attend Indians' spring training camp. He told manager Joe Gordon that he was willing to become a relief pitcher, but he retired as a player on March 5, stating, "I just couldn't keep up with the young fellows anymore." He accepted a scouting role with the Indians.

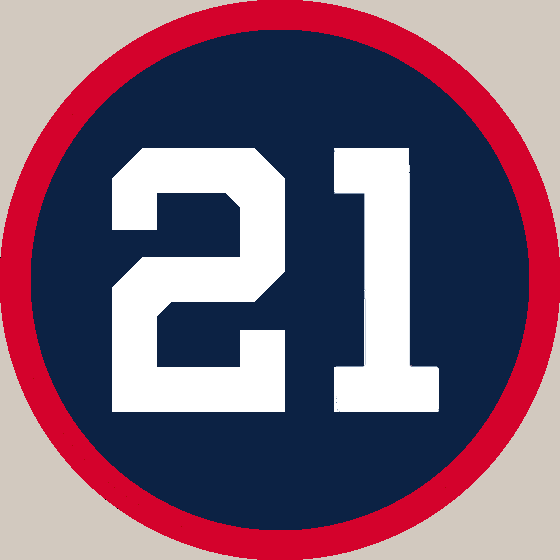
Bob Lemon's number 21 was retired by the Cleveland Indians in 1998.

Lemon retired in 1958 with 207 wins, all but ten of them occurring in a ten-year span. He recorded 274 hits in 1,183 at-bats (.232), had 147 RBI, and his 37 career home runs are second on the all-time career list for pitchers (behind Wes Ferrell's 38). In 1951, Ted Williams wrote of Lemon: "I have to rate Lemon as one of the very best pitchers I ever faced. His ball was always moving, hard, sinking, fast-breaking. You could never really uhmmmph with Lemon." The Indians retired Lemon's jersey number, 21, on June 20, 1998 (Mike Hargrove, the Indians Manager at the time who was wearing number 21 switched to number 30). Lemon was the sixth Indian to receive the honor.

On January 22, 1976, Lemon was elected to the National Baseball Hall of Fame by the Baseball Writers' Association of America. It was the twelfth ballot on which he had appeared. He received 78.6% of the vote. On August 8, one day before his induction ceremony, Lemon said, "It's a great thrill. My mother is 83 but she is making the trip from California. She says she can die happy now that I've been elected to the Hall of Fame." Lemon's dominant slider has been cited as a key reason for his election to the Hall of Fame.

== Post-playing career ==
=== Coaching ===
In 1959, Lemon became a scout and minor league pitching instructor for Cleveland. He spent part of 1959 season, and part of 1960, as a coach with the MLB Indians. In 1961, he joined the Philadelphia Phillies coaching staff. The California Angels hired him as their pitching coach for 1967–1968. In 1976, Lemon served as pitching coach for the AL champion New York Yankees. The Yankees were owned by Cleveland-area native George Steinbrenner and they had been the chief antagonists of the Cleveland Indians during Lemon's pitching years. In recognition of his election to the Hall of Fame, Lemon was named honorary captain of the AL team for the All-Star Game.

=== Managing ===
1978 SGA photo of Lemon for the New York Yankees

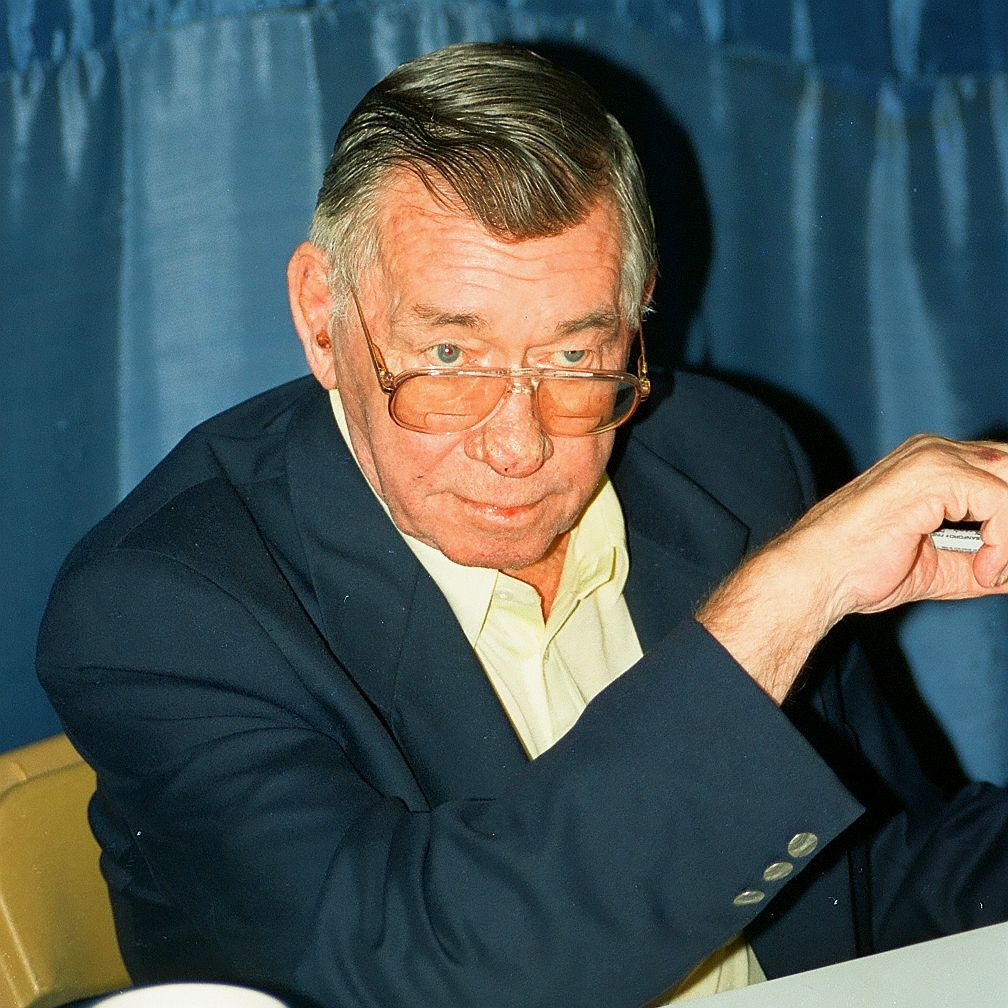
Lemon in 1995

Lemon's first managerial role came in 1964 with the Triple-A Hawaii Islanders of the PCL, an affiliate of the California Angels. The team went 60–98. In 1965, the Angels switched their Triple-A affiliation to the Seattle Angels and Lemon moved with the team. He managed the team in 1965–1966 and won the 1966 championship. He was named the PCL's Manager of the Year by The Sporting News for the 1966 season. In 1969, Lemon returned to the PCL as manager of the Vancouver Mounties, affiliated with the expansion Seattle Pilots and Montreal Expos. Lemon said he used Indians manager Al López as a model for his managing style:

"Lopez always handled his players like I'd want to be handled. He treated men like men. He made them feel relaxed. That's the only way to play this game...by being relaxed. You can't be worried about the manager getting on you. All the time I was at Cleveland, I saw Lopez get mad only twice. He never showed anybody up. I don't do it either."

Tommy John, who played under both Lopez and Lemon, noticed this similarity. "Lemon was an outstanding manager who never got the credit he deserved," John wrote in 1991. "He was like Al Lopez; he let you alone and treated you like an adult." His approach to the game was to simplify it, trying to make it easier for everyone involved. Lemon frequently called his players "Meat."

==== Kansas City Royals ====
Lemon became pitching coach of the Kansas City Royals for the 1970 season. He got his first major league managing job when Kansas City fired manager Charlie Metro on June 7, 1970. By August, Lemon received a one-year contract extension with the club:

"I know many major league owners are against hiring a former pitcher as manager and I've always wondered why. Pitching is 75 per cent of the game. If it's so important, why not have a former pitcher as manager? He can always have someone else run the other 25 per cent of the club."

In 1971, Lemon guided the Royals to their first winning season since the franchise began as an expansion team in 1969. Lemon finished second in the Associated Press AL Manager of the Year voting. Before the 1972 season, Lemon talked about the team's chances, saying "Five clubs could win it, including ourselves." However, the Royals finished 76–78. Royals owner Ewing Kauffman fired Lemon as manager, saying he wanted a younger manager and "did not want to lose Jack McKeon", who was named as Lemon's replacement (Lemon was 51 while McKeon was ten years younger). Royals outfielder Lou Piniella was one of several players who disagreed with Kauffman's decision, saying, "...Lemon deserved to manage the club next year."

Lemon returned to managing in the minor leagues. His third and final stint in the PCL was in 1974 with the Sacramento Solons, affiliated with the Milwaukee Brewers. His last minor league managerial position was in 1975 with the Atlanta Braves’ International League affiliate, the Richmond Braves.

==== Chicago White Sox ====
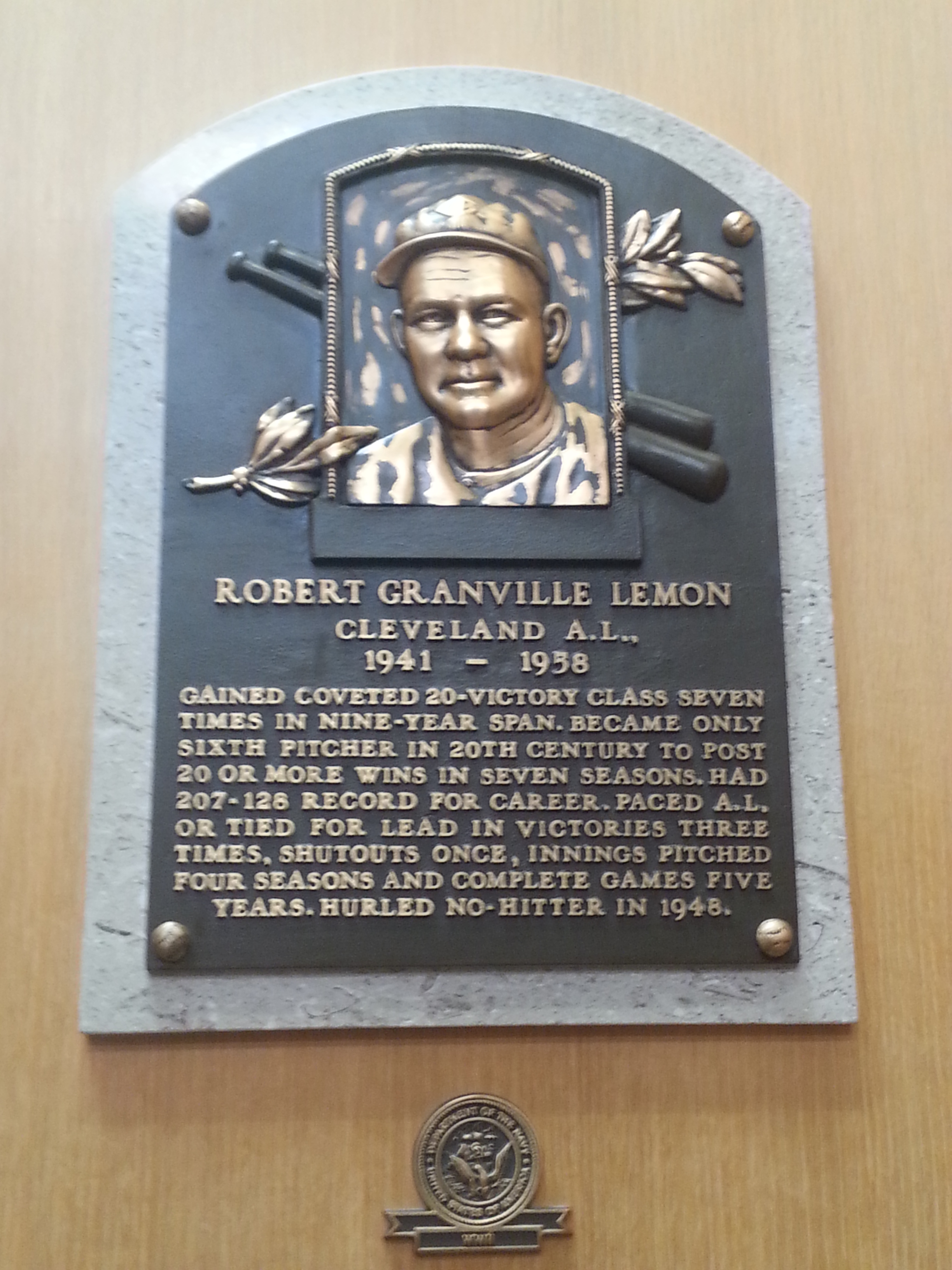
Plaque of Bob Lemon at the Baseball Hall of Fame

Bill Veeck hired Lemon to succeed Paul Richards as the Chicago White Sox manager on November 16, 1976. Lemon took over a Chicago team that finished in last place in the AL West in 1976. "Bob is the type of manager we need at this stage of the game", Veeck said. During spring training of 1977, Lemon said, "I think we'll surprise a few people." White Sox shortstop Alan Bannister quickly noticed a difference. Comparing Richards to Lemon, Bannister said, "He'd post the lineups 10 minutes before the game, and only then we'd find out who was playing and where. Lemon's made it a serious operation." As late as August 14, the White Sox were in first place in the AL West. The White Sox finished with a 90–72 record, a 26-game improvement. The team finished third in AL West and Lemon won his second Manager of the Year Award. "The fans got behind us after about three weeks. They had a lot to do with our success", Lemon said after being winning the award.

Lemon was fired the following season on June 30, 1978, by Veeck after Chicago posted a 34–40 record in the first half of the 1978 season. He was replaced by former Indians' teammate Larry Doby. "This change is not meant as any commentary on Lemon's ability but rather was the result of unusual circumstances which seemed to make a change necessary", said Veeck.

==== New York Yankees ====
Yankees manager Billy Martin resigned on July 24, 1978, and team president Al Rosen called Lemon to offer him the vacant position. He was announced as the new manager the next day. At their 1978 Old Timers Day five days after the Martin–Lemon changeover, the Yankees divulged that Lemon would be moved in 1980 to general manager, and they said that Martin would then return as field manager. The announcement was made by public-address announcer Bob Sheppard after the Old Timers had been announced and it was accompanied by Martin's dramatic entrance from the Yankee dugout. Martin received a long standing ovation from fans. Lemon responded to his new job—and to the newspaper strike that helped calm down the atmosphere in the Yankees clubhouse—by guiding the Yankees to the 1978 pennant. The Yankees, who trailed the Red Sox by 14 games at one point in July, pulled even with the Red Sox by defeating them in a four-game September series known as the "Boston Massacre". The Yankees pulled ahead by 3 1/2 games, but the Red Sox rallied to tie the Yanks by the final day of the season. A one-game playoff would determine the AL Eastern Division winner.

Ron Guidry was named the Yankees' starting pitcher for the October 2 playoff game at Fenway Park. Guidry was able to pitch "because of Lemon's good planning". The Yankees defeated Boston for the division title in the tie-breaker game, punctuated both by a dramatic three-run home run by Bucky Dent in the seventh inning, and an eighth-inning homer by Reggie Jackson that proved the game's winning run. Lemon became the third manager in MLB history to replace another mid-season and win the pennant. Lemon's Yankees then beat the Royals in the ALCS and defeated the Los Angeles Dodgers to win the World Series title. With the Series win, Lemon became the first AL manager and third MLB manager to take over a team mid-season and win a World Series. This was the second World Series championship for Lemon, who had won his last one in 1948; the thirty year gap between World championships set a record for longest gap between championships for a person that was not broken until 2022. Before the World Series, one columnist wrote, "...many observers feel that Lemon's low-keyed approach with the Yankees' temperamental millionaires as compared to the combativeness of Martin served to mold a spirit of togetherness among the Yankees that did not even exist last year when they won it all." Lemon and his handling of the season was described in The New York Times as "an island of calm in a stormy summer". Changes Lemon made during the season included returning Thurman Munson to the team's every day catcher (he had been playing in the outfield), putting Jackson in the clean-up spot in the batting order and becoming the regular right fielder, and pitching Ed Figueroa every fourth day (instead of fifth). In October, Lemon was named the Associated Press' AL Manager of the Year, the second time he received such an award.

Lemon's 26-year-old son, Jerry, was killed in an automobile accident in the fall of 1978, 10 days after Lemon won the World Series. Tommy John thought this was distracting him from fully focusing on baseball as the 1979 season began. In early June, several of the players got rowdy on a plane flight to Texas, blaring loud music from their cassette players. Lemon did nothing to intervene, which John thought might have prompted his dismissal. With the Yankees at 34–31, Lemon was fired in June by Steinbrenner and replaced by Martin, but he remained with the organization as he had a contract through the 1982 season. Speaking of Martin, Lemon said, "He's a very likeable guy, a free spirit. Where maybe I keep things inside, he lets them come out. There's nothing wrong with that." The Yankees finished in fourth place in the AL East (89–71). Lemon worked as a scout for the Yankees and received "several offers" from other teams to serve as manager. One offer came in 1979 from the Indians, but Lemon refused it as well as the others.

==== Second stint with Yankees ====
Steinbrenner named Lemon the team's field manager a second time on September 6, 1981, the sixth Yankees' manager change since 1978 after firing Gene Michael, who also had served as general manager and had won the first half of the split season. The Yankees moved on to the postseason and dispatched the Milwaukee Brewers and the Billy Martin-led Oakland Athletics, and won the first two games of the 1981 World Series against the Dodgers, only to lose four straight and the Series. Lemon survived just a few weeks into the 1982 season (the Yankees were 6–8) before Steinbrenner dismissed him one last time, despite a promise from Steinbrenner he would manage the season "no matter what". Lemon had considered resigning a week before because of Steinbrenner's constant criticisms, but coach Mike Ferraro talked him out of it. Of the agreement between Lemon and Steinbrenner, Steinbrenner said, "Lem and I talked. He said it was O.K. He said he didn't take it as a promise anyway." Tommy John thought Lemon "was relieved" at Steinbrenner's decision. Gene Michael succeeded Lemon as manager. All in all, Lemon had managed just over one full season of games (172) for the Yankees, winning 99 games for a .576 winning percentage. Lemon, however, was allowed to attend the 1982 Major League Baseball All-Star Game as a guest of Montreal Expos owner Charles Bronfman.

==== Managerial record ====
Team	Year	Regular season					Postseason			
Team	Year	Games	Won	Lost	Win %	Finish	Won	Lost	Win %	Result
KC	1970	110	46	64	.418	4th in AL West	–	–	–	–
KC	1971	161	85	76	.528	2nd in AL West	–	–	–	–
KC	1972	154	76	78	.494	4th in AL West	–	–	–	–
KC total		425	207	218	.487		0	0	–	
CWS	1977	162	90	72	.556	3rd in AL West	–	–	–	–
CWS	1978	74	34	40	.459	fired	–	–	–	–
CWS total		236	124	112	.525		0	0	–	
NYY	1978	68	48	20	.706	1st in AL East	7	3	.700	Won World Series (LAD)
NYY	1979	65	34	31	.523	fired	–	–	–	–
NYY	1981	25	11	14	.440	6th in AL East	8	6	.571	Lost World Series (LAD)
NYY	1982	14	6	8	.429	fired	–	–	–	–
NYY total		172	99	73	.576		15	9	.625	
Total		833	430	403	.516		15	9	.625	

== Highlights and awards ==
- 7× All-Star (1948, 1949, 1950, 1951, 1952, 1953, 1954)
- 7× 20-plus wins in a season (1948–1950, 1952–1954, 1956)
- 5× AL leader in complete games (1948, 1950, 1952, 1954, 1956)
- Led MLB in shutouts (10, 1948)
- 5× led MLB or AL in putouts (1948–1949, 1952–1954)
- 6× led MLB or AL in assists (1948–1949, 1951–1953, 1956)
- 3× finished fifth in MVP voting (1948, 1950, 1954)
- World Series Champion, player (1948)
- Led AL in strikeouts (170, 1950)
- 3x AL Pitcher of the Year Award (1948, 1950, 1954)
- 2× MLB leader in wins (1950, 1954)
- Major league record for pitcher 15 double plays in one season (1953)
- Led AL in wins (1955)
- World Series Champion, manager (1978)
- #21 number retired by Cleveland Indians
- In 2013, the Bob Feller Act of Valor Award honored Lemon as one of 37 Baseball Hall of Fame members for his service in the United States Navy during World War II.

== Death ==
Lemon suffered a stroke in his later years. Lemon died in 2000 in Long Beach, California, where he had been a permanent resident since his career as a player. Former teammate Bob Feller said, "Bob had a good curve, a good slider, and a vicious sinker pitch. He wasn't overly fast, but he always stayed ahead of the hitters and he didn't walk many batters, which is the key to success in the majors."

== See also ==
- List of Major League Baseball career wins leaders
- List of Major League Baseball annual strikeout leaders
- List of Major League Baseball annual wins leaders
- List of Major League Baseball all-time leaders in home runs by pitchers
- Major League Baseball titles leaders
- List of Major League Baseball no-hitters
- List of Major League Baseball players who spent their entire career with one franchise

Preceded by Bill McCahan	No-hitter pitcher June 30, 1948	Succeeded by Rex Barney
