= The Catch (baseball) =

Defensive play by Willie Mays in the 1954 World Series

Willie Mays catches Vic Wertz's deep fly ball on the warning track in the 1954 World Series.

The Catch was a baseball play made by New York Giants center fielder Willie Mays on September 29, 1954, during Game 1 of the 1954 World Series at the Polo Grounds in Upper Manhattan, New York City. In the eighth inning, with the score tied 2–2, Cleveland Indians batter Vic Wertz hit a deep fly ball to center field that had the runners on base poised to score. However, Mays made an over-the-shoulder catch while on the run to record the out, and his throw back to the infield prevented one of the runners from advancing. The Giants won the game 5–2 in extra innings, and eventually the World Series. The Catch is regarded as one of the greatest plays in baseball history.

== The play ==
In the top of the 8th inning, with the score tied 2–2, Giants starting pitcher Sal Maglie walked Indians leadoff hitter Larry Doby. Al Rosen singled, putting runners on first and second. New York manager Leo Durocher summoned left-handed relief pitcher Don Liddle to pitch to Cleveland's Wertz, a left-handed batter.

Wertz worked the count to two balls and one strike before hitting Liddle's fourth pitch about 420 feet (130 m) to deep center field. In many stadiums, the ball would have been a home run, which would have given the Indians a 5–2 lead. However, the Polo Grounds center field was the deepest in the league, marked as 483 feet (147 m), (Note: The center field measurement at the Polo Grounds was marked differently at different times; see discussion in the Broadcast section.) and Mays, who was playing in shallow center field, made an on-the-run, over-the-shoulder catch at the warning track for the out. Having caught the ball, he immediately spun and threw to second base. Doby, the runner on second, might have been able to score the go-ahead run had he tagged at the moment the ball was caught; as it was, he ran when the ball was hit, then had to scramble back to tag. Mays' throw went to second base, holding Cleveland to runners at first and third with one out.

Right-hander Marv Grissom then relieved Liddle, who supposedly remarked to coach Freddie Fitzsimmons, "Well, I got my man." Grissom walked pinch hitter Dale Mitchell to load the bases, then struck out pinch hitter Dave Pope, and got catcher Jim Hegan to fly out, ending the inning with no runs scored.

Mays and Polo Grounds center field distance marker

Summary – top of the 8th inning
Pitcher New York Giants	Batter Cleveland Indians	Result (outs in bold)
Maglie (R)	Doby (L)	Walk
Maglie (R)	Rosen (R)	Single (Doby to second)
Liddle (L)	Wertz (L)	**Fly out to center** (Doby to third)
Grissom (R)	Mitchell (L)	Walk (Rosen to second)
Grissom (R)	Pope (L)	**Strike out**
Grissom (R)	Hegan (R)	**Fly out to left**

== Broadcast ==
Jack Brickhouse, calling the game for NBC television along with Russ Hodges, described Mays' catch to viewers. The audio has been published on CD with the 2000 book And the Fans Roared, and also as accompaniment to the World Series film.

Diagram of the Polo Grounds from 1951

Brickhouse: There's a long drive... way back at center field... way back, back, it is a... Oh my! Caught by Mays! The runner on second, Doby, is able to go to third. Willie Mays just brought this crowd to its feet with a catch which must have been an optical illusion to a lot of people! Boy! [pause] Notice where that 483 foot mark is in center field? The ball itself—Russ, you know this ballpark better than anyone else I know—had to go about 460, (Note: 460 feet (140 m)) didn't it?

Hodges: It certainly did, and I don't see how Willie did it, but he's been doing it all year.

Brickhouse: Willie Mays just made the catch of the day.

There is some question of the depth of straight-away center field. Sometimes there was a 475 (Note: 475 feet (145 m)) sign in center field, sometimes 483 (Note: 483 feet (147 m)) (as was the case in 1954). The ballpark was demolished in 1964, and it is unclear what was being measured when. One theory is that 475 was the distance to the front of the clubhouse overhang, and 483 was the distance to the rear wall under the overhang. Regardless, the ball was not hit to the deepest part of center field; the spot where Mays made his catch is estimated by baseball researchers not to be more than 425 feet (130 m) from home plate.

== Aftermath and response ==
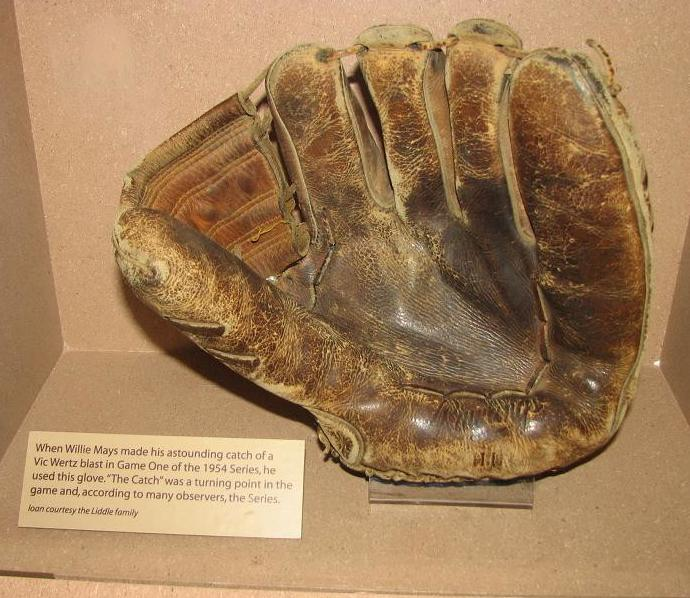
The baseball glove that Willie Mays used in "The Catch" on display at the National Baseball Hall of Fame and Museum in 2008

The play prevented the Indians from taking the lead and, in the bottom of the 10th, the Giants won the game on their way to sweeping the Series. The Catch is often considered to be one of the best and most memorable plays in the history of baseball because of the difficulty of the play, its importance in the game, and the importance of the game itself. Bob Feller said both that it was a very good catch and: "We knew Willie had the ball all the way." Later, Feller said, "There's three things that made the catch memorable: one, it was a great play. Two, it was in a World Series. And three, it was on national television."

Mays himself did not believe "The Catch" to be the best defensive play he ever made. In a 2006 CD collection, Ernie Harwell's Audio Scrapbook, Mays talks about a running bare-handed catch he made at Forbes Field in Pittsburgh in 1951, after which the Giants' players teased the young rookie by treating him with complete indifference when he returned to the bench. Mays also cited a catch he made against the center field wall at Ebbets Field in Brooklyn, New York, in which he had to scurry back so fast he did not have time to turn around.

In 2007, a physicist calculated that if the temperature had been 77 °F (25 °C) rather than 76 °F (24 °C), the ball would have traveled 2 inches (5.1 cm) farther than it did, and The Catch might not have been completed.
