= 1944 New York Giants (MLB) season =

1944 New York Giants
- League: National League
- Ballpark: Polo Grounds
- City: New York City
- Record: 67–87 (.435)
- League place: 5th
- Owners: Horace Stoneham
- Managers: Mel Ott
- Radio: WINS (Don Dunphy, Bill Slater)

The 1944 New York Giants season was the franchise's 62nd season. The team finished in fifth place in the National League with a 67–87 record, 38 games behind the St. Louis Cardinals.

== Offseason ==
- Prior to 1944 season: Art Fowler was signed by the Giants as an amateur free agent.

== Regular season ==
=== Season standings ===
National League
Team	W	L	Pct.	GB	Home	Road
St. Louis Cardinals	105	49	.682	—	54‍–‍22	51‍–‍27
Pittsburgh Pirates	90	63	.588	14½	49‍–‍28	41‍–‍35
Cincinnati Reds	89	65	.578	16	45‍–‍33	44‍–‍32
Chicago Cubs	75	79	.487	30	35‍–‍42	40‍–‍37
New York Giants	67	87	.435	38	39‍–‍36	28‍–‍51
Boston Braves	65	89	.422	40	38‍–‍40	27‍–‍49
Brooklyn Dodgers	63	91	.409	42	37‍–‍39	26‍–‍52
Philadelphia Phillies	61	92	.399	43½	29‍–‍49	32‍–‍43

=== Record vs. opponents ===
1944 National League record Sources:
Team	BSN	BRO	CHC	CIN	NYG	PHI	PIT	STL
Boston	—	9–13	11–11	8–14	9–13	11–11–1	9–13	8–14
Brooklyn	13–9	—	8–14–1	8–14	10–12	16–6	4–18	4–18
Chicago	11–11	14–8–1	—	9–13–1	10–12	13–9	12–10–1	6–16
Cincinnati	14–8	14–8	13–9–1	—	15–7	13–19	12–10	8–14
New York	13–9	12–10	12–10	7–15	—	10–12	7–15–1	6–16
Philadelphia	11–11–1	6–16	9–13	9–13	12–10	—	9–12	5–17
Pittsburgh	13–9	18–4	10–12–1	10–12	15–7–1	12–9	—	12–10–3
St. Louis	14–8	18–4	16–6	14–8	16–6	17–5	10–12–3	—

=== Roster ===
1944 New York Giants
Roster
Pitchers: 27 Ace Adams; 22 Johnny Allen; 21 Bob Barthelson; 32 Jack Brewer; 23 Ken Brondell; 14 Harry Feldman; 15 Rube Fischer; 20 Johnny Gee; 24 Andy Hansen; 16 Cliff Melton; 21 Whitey Miller; 20 Walter Ockey; 26 Lou Polli; 18 Ewald Pyle; -- Frank Rosso; 19 Frank Seward; 17 Bill Voiselle	Catchers: 29 Ray Berres; 8 Ernie Lombardi; 9 Gus Mancuso; Infielders: 12 George Hausmann; 7 Billy Jurges; 10 Buddy Kerr; 2 Hal Luby; 32 Roy Nichols; 6 Nap Reyes; 5 Phil Weintraub	Outfielders: 34 Steve Filipowicz; 33 Danny Gardella; 24 Charlie Mead; 4 Joe Medwick; 4 Mel Ott; 1 Johnny Rucker; 25 Bruce Sloan; 26 Red Treadway	Manager: 4 Mel Ott; Coaches: 30 Bubber Jonnard; 31 Adolfo Luque

== Player stats ==
= Indicates team leader

=== Batting ===
==== Starters by position ====
Note: Pos = Position; G = Games played; AB = At bats; H = Hits; Avg. = Batting average; HR = Home runs; RBI = Runs batted in

Pos	Player	G	AB	H	Avg.	HR	RBI
C	Ernie Lombardi	117	373	95	.255	10	58
1B	Phil Weintraub	104	361	114	.316	13	77
2B	George Hausmann	131	466	124	.266	1	30
SS	Buddy Kerr	150	548	146	.266	9	63
3B	Hal Luby	111	323	82	.254	2	35
OF	Mel Ott	120	399	115	.288	26	82
OF	Joe Medwick	128	490	165	.337	7	85
OF	Johnny Rucker	144	587	143	.244	6	39

==== Other batters ====
Note: G = Games played; AB = At bats; H = Hits; Avg. = Batting average; HR = Home runs; RBI = Runs batted in

Player	G	AB	H	Avg.	HR	RBI
Nap Reyes	116	374	108	.289	8	53
Billy Jurges	85	246	52	.211	1	23
Gus Mancuso	78	195	49	.251	1	25
Red Treadway	50	170	51	.300	0	5
Danny Gardella	47	112	28	.250	6	14
Bruce Sloan	59	104	28	.269	1	9
Charlie Mead	39	78	14	.179	1	8
Steve Filipowicz	15	41	8	.195	0	7
Ray Berres	16	17	8	.471	1	2
Roy Nichols	11	9	2	.222	0	0

=== Pitching ===
= Indicates league leader

==== Starting pitchers ====
Note: G = Games pitched; IP = Innings pitched; W = Wins; L = Losses; ERA = Earned run average; SO = Strikeouts

Player	G	IP	W	L	ERA	SO
Bill Voiselle	43	312.2	21	16	3.02	161
Harry Feldman	40	205.1	11	13	4.16	70
Ewald Pyle	31	164.0	7	10	4.34	79
Johnny Allen	18	84.0	4	7	4.07	33
Cliff Melton	13	64.1	2	2	4.06	15

==== Other pitchers ====
Note: G = Games pitched; IP = Innings pitched; W = Wins; L = Losses; ERA = Earned run average; SO = Strikeouts

Player	G	IP	W	L	ERA	SO
Rube Fischer	38	128.2	6	14	5.18	39
Frank Seward	25	78.1	3	2	5.40	16
Jack Brewer	14	55.0	1	4	5.56	21
Andy Hansen	23	52.2	3	3	6.49	15
Ken Brondell	7	19.1	0	1	8.38	1

==== Relief pitchers ====
Note: G = Games pitched; W = Wins; L = Losses; SV = Saves; ERA = Earned run average; SO = Strikeouts

Player	G	W	L	SV	ERA	SO
Ace Adams	65	8	11	13	4.25	32
Lou Polli	19	0	2	3	4.54	6
Bob Barthelson	7	1	1	0	4.66	4
Whitey Miller	4	0	1	0	0.00	2
Johnny Gee	4	0	0	0	0.00	3
Frank Rosso	2	0	0	0	9.00	1
Walter Ockey	2	0	0	0	3.38	1

== Farm system ==
Level	Team	League	Manager
AA	Jersey City Giants	International League	Gabby Hartnett
B	Richmond Colts	Piedmont League	Ben Chapman and Taylor Sanford
D	Bristol Twins	Appalachian League	Hal Gruber
D	Springfield Giants	Ohio State League	Earl Wolgamot
D	Erie Sailors	PONY League	Bill Harris
