= 2004 in baseball =

The following are the baseball events of the year 2004 throughout the world.

== Headline events of the year ==
- The Boston Red Sox win their first World Series since 1918, ending the Curse of the Bambino.
- With 262 hits, Ichiro Suzuki of the Mariners breaks George Sisler's record of 257. Suzuki also sets the record for most singles in a season, with 225.
- 2004 also marked the final year of the Montreal Expos, who relocated at season's end to Washington, D.C., and become known as the Washington Nationals.
- For the first time in Japanese professional baseball history, players in Nippon Professional Baseball went on strike for two days because of the 2004 Nippon Professional Baseball realignment.

== Champions ==
=== Major League Baseball ===
- Regular Season Champions

League	Eastern Division Champion	Central Division Champion	Western Division Champion	Wild Card Qualifier
American League	New York Yankees	Minnesota Twins	Anaheim Angels	Boston Red Sox
National League	Atlanta Braves	St. Louis Cardinals	Los Angeles Dodgers	Houston Astros

- World Series Champion – Boston Red Sox
- Postseason – October 4 to October 27

Division Series; TV: ESPN/FOX
1	New York Yankees	3
3	Minnesota Twins	1
American League
2	Anaheim Angels	0
4	Boston Red Sox	3
1	St. Louis Cardinals	3
3	Los Angeles Dodgers	1
National League
2	Atlanta Braves	2
4	Houston Astros	3

League Championship Series; TV: FOX
1	New York Yankees	3
4	Boston Red Sox	4
1	St. Louis Cardinals	4
4	Houston Astros	3

World Series; TV: FOX
AL4	Boston Red Sox	4
NL1	St. Louis Cardinals	0

Click on any series score to link to that series' page.
Higher seed has home field advantage during Division Series and League Championship Series.
American League has home field advantage during World Series as a result of American League victory in 2004 All-Star Game.
American/National League is seeded 1-3/2-4 as a result of A/NL regular season champion (New York Yankees)/(St. Louis Cardinals) and A/NL wild card (Boston Red Sox)(Houston Astros) coming from the same division.

- Postseason MVPs
  - World Series MVP – Manny Ramírez
  - ALCS MVP – David Ortiz
  - NLCS MVP – Albert Pujols
- All-Star Game, July 13 at Minute Maid Park: American League, 9-4; Alfonso Soriano, MVP
  - Home Run Derby, July 12 – Miguel Tejada, Baltimore Orioles

=== Other champions ===
- Caribbean Series: Tigres de Licey (Dominican Republic)
- College World Series: Cal State-Fullerton
- Cuban National Series: Industriales def. Villa Clara
- Japan Series: Seibu Lions over Chunichi Dragons (4-3)
- Korean Series: Hyundai Unicorns over Samsung Lions
- Big League World Series: District 1 - Easley, South Carolina
- Junior League World Series: Palma Ceia/Bayshore LL - Tampa, Florida
- Little League World Series: Pabao, Willemstad, Curaçao
- Senior League World Series: Freehold Township LL - Freehold Township, New Jersey
- Summer Olympic Games at Athens, Greece: Cuba (Gold), Australia (Silver), Japan (Bronze)
- European Cup: Neptunus (Netherlands) over Fortitudo Bologna (Italy)
- Taiwan Series: Sinon Bulls over Uni-President Lions

== Awards and honors ==
- Baseball Hall of Fame
  - Dennis Eckersley
  - Paul Molitor
- Most Valuable Player
  - Vladimir Guerrero, Anaheim Angels, OF (AL)
  - Barry Bonds, San Francisco Giants, OF (NL)
- Cy Young Award
  - Johan Santana, Minnesota Twins (AL)
  - Roger Clemens, Houston Astros (NL)
- Rookie of the Year
  - Bobby Crosby, Oakland Athletics, SS (AL)
  - Jason Bay, Pittsburgh Pirates, OF (NL)
- Manager of the Year Award
  - Buck Showalter, Texas Rangers (AL)
  - Bobby Cox, Atlanta Braves (NL)
- Woman Executive of the Year (major or minor league): Carolyn McKee, Asheville Tourists, South Atlantic League

== Statistical leaders ==
	American League		National League
Type	Name	Stat	Name	Stat
AVG	Ichiro Suzuki SEA	.372	Barry Bonds SF	.362
HR	Manny Ramírez BOS	43	Adrián Beltré LAD	48
RBI	Miguel Tejada BAL	150	Vinny Castilla COL	131
Wins	Curt Schilling BOS	21	Roy Oswalt HOU	20
ERA	Johan Santana MIN	2.61	Jake Peavy SD	2.27
Ks	Johan Santana MIN	265	Randy Johnson AZ	290

== Notable seasons ==
- Barry Bonds of the Giants has another outstanding year. He sets the all-time record for highest on-base percentage at .609, breaking his previous record of .582, set in 2002. He also posts a slugging average of .812, the fourth-highest ever, and also breaks his previous OPS record of 1.381, set in 2002, with a 2004 OPS of 1.422. Bonds also set a record for most walks in a season, with 232. Finally, with 120 intentional walks, he almost doubles his previous record of 68.
- Adam Dunn's 195 strikeouts break Bobby Bonds' previous record of 189.
- With 262 hits, Ichiro Suzuki of the Mariners breaks George Sisler's record of 257. Suzuki also sets the record for most singles in a season, with 225.

== Major league baseball final standings ==
American League
Rank	Club	Wins	Losses	Win %	GB
East Division
1st	New York Yankees	101	61	.623	--
2nd	Boston Red Sox *	98	64	.605	3.0
3rd	Baltimore Orioles	78	84	.481	23.0
4th	Tampa Bay Devil Rays	70	91	.435	30.5
5th	Toronto Blue Jays	67	94	.416	33.5
Central Division
1st	Minnesota Twins	92	70	.568	--
2nd	Chicago White Sox	83	79	.512	9.0
3rd	Cleveland Indians	80	82	.494	12.0
4th	Detroit Tigers	72	90	.444	20.0
5th	Kansas City Royals	58	104	.358	34.0
West Division
1st	Anaheim Angels	92	70	.568	--
2nd	Oakland Athletics	91	71	.562	1.0
3rd	Texas Rangers	89	73	.549	3.0
4th	Seattle Mariners	63	99	.389	29.0

National League
Rank	Club	Wins	Losses	Win %	GB
East Division
1st	Atlanta Braves	96	66	.593	--
2nd	Philadelphia Phillies	86	76	.531	10.0
3rd	Florida Marlins	83	79	.512	13.0
4th	New York Mets	71	91	.438	25.0
5th	Montreal Expos	67	95	.414	29.0
Central Division
1st	St. Louis Cardinals	105	57	.648	--
2nd	Houston Astros *	92	70	.568	13.0
3rd	Chicago Cubs	89	73	.549	16.0
4th	Cincinnati Reds	76	86	.469	29.0
5th	Pittsburgh Pirates	72	89	.447	32.5
6th	Milwaukee Brewers	67	94	.416	37.5
West Division
1st	Los Angeles Dodgers	93	69	.574	--
2nd	San Francisco Giants	91	71	.562	2.0
3rd	San Diego Padres	87	75	.537	6.0
4th	Colorado Rockies	68	94	.420	25.0
5th	Arizona Diamondbacks	51	111	.315	42.0

- The asterisk denotes the club that won the wild card for its respective league.

== Events ==
=== January ===
- January 6 – Dennis Eckersley and Paul Molitor are elected to the National Baseball Hall of Fame by the BBWAA in their first year of eligibility. Eckersley, who spent a 24-year career with the Cleveland Indians, Boston Red Sox, Chicago Cubs, Oakland Athletics and St. Louis Cardinals, is one of only a few pitchers to excel as both a starter and a closer, becoming the only pitcher in Major League history to collect 100 complete games and 100 saves, while posting ten or more wins 10 times, including a 20-win season, a no-hitter in 1977, and winning the American League MVP and Cy Young Awards in 1992. A versatile player, able to cover positions across infield and outfield, Molitor is only the third player with at least 3,000 hits 600 doubles and 500 stolen bases, being the others Ty Cobb and Honus Wagner. Besides, Molitor collected seven consecutive hits with the Milwaukee Brewers in the 1982 World Series, including the first five-hit game ever in a Series. At the age of 37, after signing with the Toronto Blue Jays, Molitor collected 111 RBI, becoming the oldest player in Major League history to post his first 100-RBI season. Then when Toronto defeated the Philadelphia Phillies in six games in the 1993 World Series, he was named MVP after hitting a .500 average (12-for-24) with two home runs and eighth RBI, while tying a Series record with 10 runs scored.
- January 12 – Roger Clemens signs a contract with the Houston Astros, ending his retirement after the 2003 season.

=== February ===
- February 15 – Alex Rodriguez is traded by the Texas Rangers to the New York Yankees in exchange for Alfonso Soriano and a player to be named later.

=== March ===
- March 4 – Commissioner Bud Selig announces that Major League Baseball will celebrate Jackie Robinson Day in every ballpark on April 15, commemorating and honoring the anniversary of the debut of Jackie Robinson, who became the first black major league baseball player of the modern era in the 1947 season. Previously, Robinson's uniform number "42" was retired for all time in a ceremony at Shea Stadium in April 1997 to mark the 50th anniversary of his achievement. His debut with the Brooklyn Dodgers ended approximately 80 years of baseball segregation, also known as the baseball color line.
- March 21 – Veterans Stadium, home of the Philadelphia Phillies from 1971 to 2003, is demolished in a 62-second implosion. It hosted the Philadelphia Phillies of Major League Baseball from 1971 to 2003 and the Philadelphia Eagles of the National Football League from 1971 to January 2003. Likewise, the 1976 and 1996 Major League Baseball All-Star Games were held at the venue, and the Vet also hosted the annual Army-Navy football game seventeen times between 1980 and 2001.

=== April ===
- April 8 – In the first-ever regular-season game at San Diego's Petco Park, the San Diego Padres defeat the San Francisco Giants, 4-3, in ten innings.
- April 12 – Barry Bonds ties his godfather Willie Mays for third on the all-time career home run list with his 660th home run coming in the fifth inning off of Milwaukee Brewers starter Matt Kinney.
- April 12 – The Cincinnati Reds defeat the Philadelphia Phillies, 4-1, in the first game played at Philadelphia's Citizens Bank Park.
- April 13 – Pitcher Dennis Eckersley, catcher-manager Bill Carrigan and infielders Wade Boggs, Billy Goodman and Pete Runnels are selected for induction into the Boston Red Sox Hall of Fame. The club's Hall of Fame selection committee conducts its voting at a meeting last fall.
- April 14 – At Yankee Stadium, Kevin Brown of the New York Yankees wins his 200th career game, the Yankees defeating the Tampa Bay Devil Rays 5-1. Brown's victory follows teammate Mike Mussina's 200th career victory in the team's most recent game three days earlier, the Yankees having defeated the Chicago White Sox 5-4. The Yankees become the first team to have two pitchers record their 200th career victories in the same season, and their duo reaches their milestones in consecutive games.
- April 18 – At Wrigley Field, Sammy Sosa sets the record for most home runs in a Chicago Cub uniform. In the first inning of the Cubs' 11-10, 10-inning loss to the Cincinnati Reds, Sosa, who entered the game tied with Ernie Banks with 512 home runs as a Cub, homers off Paul Wilson; he will hit another home run off Wilson in the third inning. At the end of the season, Sosa will be traded to the Baltimore Orioles, after hitting 545 home runs as a Cub.
- April 27 – Chad Moeller becomes the fifth Milwaukee Brewers player to hit for the cycle, the first to do it at home, and the first since Paul Molitor did it on May 15, 1991 against the Minnesota Twins.

=== May ===
- May 8 – At Fenway Park, Pokey Reese has the first two-homer game of his career in the Boston Red Sox' 9-1 victory over the Kansas City Royals. Curt Schilling pitches his first AL complete game, and the 80th of his career, while striking out eight. Reese hits an inside-the-park home run and one of the conventional type over the Green Monster, to snap a 172 at-bat homerless streak dating to April 4, 2003. The last Red Sox player to hit a conventional homer and an inside-the-park homer in the same game was Tony Armas on September 24, 1983, at Tiger Stadium.
- May 12 – In one of the most remarkable at-bats in major league history, Alex Cora fouls off 14 consecutive pitches and then hits the 18th pitch over the right field fence for a two-run home run off Chicago Cubs pitcher Matt Clement. The homer extends the Los Angeles Dodgers lead to 4-0. The Dodger Stadium crowd cheers each foul ball as the total starts to be displayed on the scoreboard.
- May 18 – Arizona Diamondbacks pitcher Randy Johnson becomes only the 17th person in major league history to throw a perfect game, throwing 13 strikeouts on his way to a 2-0 defeat of the Atlanta Braves.
- May 26 – The Pittsburgh Pirates' Daryle Ward hits for the cycle in the Pirates' 11-8 victory over the St. Louis Cardinals. It is done 23 times in Pittsburgh history and 243 times in the majors since 1882. Ward joins his father, Gary Ward, to become the first father-son combination in major league history to hit for the cycle. The senior Ward accomplished the feat on September 18, 1980, for the Minnesota Twins.
- May 28 – Mariano Rivera notches his 300th career save in the New York Yankees' 7-5 victory over the Tampa Bay Devil Rays. He also becomes the first Yankee and 17th reliever in major league history to reach the milestone.
- May 28 – Matt Clement becomes the 21st big league pitcher and the first Chicago Cubs pitcher in over a century to hit three batters in one inning, to tie a major league record. The victims plunked in the fifth inning of the first game of a doubleheader against Pittsburgh are Bobby Hill, Jason Kendall and Craig Wilson.

=== June ===
- June 12 – San Francisco Giants outfielder Barry Bonds drills a solo home run (the 675th of his career) off the Baltimore Orioles' Rodrigo López, who becomes the 400th pitcher to be a victim. Bonds' performance upstages a milestone afternoon by Rafael Palmeiro, who hits his 536th and 537th homers to move past Mickey Mantle into 11th place on the career list. It is only the third time in baseball history that two players with 500 homers connect in the same game. Willie Mays and Ernie Banks did it in 1970, and Mays and Hank Aaron both homered on May 8, 1971.
- June 20 – On Father's Day afternoon at Busch Stadium, with his father, Ken Griffey, Sr., in attendance, Cincinnati Reds outfielder Ken Griffey Jr. goes deep on a 2-2 fastball from the St. Louis Cardinals' Matt Morris, securing a spot in the record books as the 20th player with 500 career home runs. The home run also ties Griffey Jr. with his father in career hits (2,143).
- June 24 – Carlos Beltrán is traded from the Royals to the Astros.
- June 25 – Larry Walker hits 3 home runs helping the Colorado Rockies beat the Cleveland Indians 10-8.
- June 26 – With a 6-4 victory over the Florida Marlins, the Tampa Bay Devil Rays have a record of 36-35, becoming the first team in Major League history to have a winning record after being 18 games under .500. At one point in the season, they are 10-28, then go on a 26-7 run. Before falling under .500 for good in July, the Rays win or tie 13 out of 14 series, including three consecutive sweeps during a club-record 12-game winning streak.
- June 27 – College World Series: Cal State Fullerton wins the NCAA College World Series, defeating Texas 3-2 to win the best-of-three championship series 2-0. The Longhorns later stir up controversy by refusing to accept the runner-up trophy.
- June 28 – David Bell hits for the cycle as the Philadelphia Phillies slug their way to a 14-6 victory over the Montreal Expos. Bell goes 4-for-4, scores two runs, and gets a career-high six RBI. He becomes the third player to hit for the cycle this season, joining the Pirates' Daryle Ward and the Brewers' Chad Moeller. Coincidentally, Ward and his father Gary Ward accomplish the feat, and when Bell achieves the honor, he joins his grandfather Gus Bell, who turned the trick on June 4, 1951.
- June 29 – At home, the Yankees' Tony Clark hits a deep-center two-run homer off Derek Lowe, to help his team to an 11-3 win over the Boston Red Sox. Clark joins Bernie Williams and Danny Tartabull as the only players to reach the center-field bleachers more than once since the remodeled Yankee Stadium opened in 1976.

=== July ===
- July 1 – The Yankees defeat the Red Sox 5-4 in 13 innings in a game notable for Derek Jeter making a running catch and promptly flying into the stands to save a Red Sox run and John Flaherty's pinch-hit walk-off single that seals a three-game sweep for the Yankees.
- July 5 – Éric Gagné's consecutive saves streak ends at 84 in a 6-5 Los Angeles Dodgers victory against the Arizona Diamondbacks, the last team to keep him from converting a save. Gagné hasn't blown a save chance since David Dellucci hit a game-tying double on August 26, 2002. These are his only blown saves in 75 attempts at Dodger Stadium. During the streak, Gagné blew the lead in the 2003 Major League Baseball All-Star Game when he allowed a home run to the Texas Rangers' Hank Blalock, but that exhibition game did not count in the statistics.
- July 6 – Detroit Tigers pitcher Jason Johnson becomes the first player in Major League Baseball history to get permission to wear an insulin pump on the field. A diabetic, Johnson wears the pump on his belt on the left side of his lower back, in order to minimize the chance of it being hit by a bat or thrown ball.
- July 10 – Barry Bonds breaks his own record for intentional walks received in a season; amazingly, he breaks the former full-season record of 68, set in 2002, before the All-Star break. After three intentional walks in a 3-1 San Francisco Giants win over the Arizona Diamondbacks, his total stands at 71; he finishes with 120.
- July 13 – In the 75th All-Star Game, played at Minute Maid Park, the American League rocks Roger Clemens for six runs in the first inning, including home runs by Manny Ramírez and Alfonso Soriano, and coasts to a 9-4 victory over the National League before 41,886 fans. Mark Mulder is the winning pitcher, Clemens gets the loss, and Soriano is selected the MVP.
- July 16 – Cleveland Indians catcher Víctor Martínez hits three home runs, singles twice, draws a walk, and drives in a career-high seven runs in a perfect 5-for-5 game, recording his first career multi-homer game, as the Indians belt eight homers and 21 hits in an 18-6 rout of the Seattle Mariners. Matt Lawton, Casey Blake, Ben Broussard, Travis Hafner and Jody Gerut add shots; Lawton, Martínez and Blake homer in consecutive at-bats in the third inning. It is the first time Cleveland hits three consecutive homers since Jim Thome, Albert Belle, and Julio Franco accomplish the feat on September 12, 1996. Broussard, Martínez, Hafner and Gerut all homer in the ninth inning as the Indians match their team record for home runs in one game, previously accomplished at Milwaukee on April 25, 1997. Cleveland also sets a new Safeco Field HR record, surpassing the six homers hit by the Kansas City Royals in 2003. The major league record for home runs in a game is 10, set by the Toronto Blue Jays in 1987.
- July 16 – With his solo home run in the eighth inning of the Philadelphia Phillies' 5-1 victory over the New York Mets, Bobby Abreu joins Willie Mays, Bobby Bonds and Barry Bonds by reaching the elite 20-homers/20-steal plateau for a sixth consecutive season. This quartet is the only group of players to have six consecutive 20-20 seasons in major league history. Abreu also becomes the only member of the quartet with no family connection to Barry, his late father Bobby, or his godfather Willie.
- July 23 – At Fenway Park, Kevin Millar becomes the third player to hit three home runs in a Boston Red Sox-New York Yankees game, joining Lou Gehrig (1927) and Mo Vaughn (1997). Despite Millar's effort, the Yankees edge the Sox 8-7.
- July 24 – In a Red Sox 11-10 win over the Yankees, also at Fenway Park, Alex Rodriguez and Jason Varitek begin a bench-clearing brawl after Rodriguez was hit by a Bronson Arroyo pitch. Gabe Kapler and Tanyon Sturtze break into the fight, giving Sturtze a bloody ear.
- July 29 – New York Mets outfielder Eric Valent becomes the eighth player in Mets history to hit for the cycle to lead his team to a 10-1 victory over the Montreal Expos at Olympic Stadium. Valent goes 4 for 4 with a walk, drives in three runs and scores three times in becoming the fourth player in the majors this season to hit a single, double, triple, and home run in a game – joining Milwaukee's Chad Moeller, Pittsburgh's Daryle Ward, and Philadelphia's David Bell.
- July 30 – The Pittsburgh Pirates obtain OF/IF José Bautista from the New York Mets. Bautista becomes the 10th major leaguer to play for four teams in a season. He begins the year with Baltimore and also plays with Tampa Bay and Kansas City, in addition to Pittsburgh. The last to do so was Dan Miceli (2003). Before him, the four-in-one players were Frank Huelsman (1904), Willis Hudlin (1940), Paul Lehner (1951), Ted Gray (1955), Wes Covington (1961), Mike Kilkenny (1972), Dave Kingman (1977) and Dave Martinez (2000). Bautista is technically on five teams, because he is acquired by New York from Kansas City but is sent to Pittsburgh the same day.
- July 31 – The Boston Red Sox send five-time All-Star shortstop Nomar Garciaparra to the Chicago Cubs in a four-team deal that highlights clubs beating baseball's trade deadline. Montreal Expos shortstop Orlando Cabrera, Cubs shortstop Alex S. Gonzalez and Minnesota Twins first baseman Doug Mientkiewicz also move in the four-way trade. The Red Sox wind up with Cabrera and Mientkiewicz, both Gold Glovers; the Cubs get Garciaparra and minor league outfielder Matt Murton; Montreal acquires Gonzalez, pitcher Francis Beltrán and infielder Brendan Harris, and the Twins get minor league pitcher Justin Jones.

=== August ===
- August 3 – The St. Louis Cardinals' Albert Pujols, at age 24, becomes the first player ever to hit at least 30 home runs in each of his first four seasons. In 1936, Joe DiMaggio belted 29 home runs in his rookie season with the New York Yankees, and 30 or more in the following five seasons. Mark McGwire hit three homers in his 1986 first year with the Oakland Athletics, and 30 or more in the next four seasons. Pujols also becomes the first Cardinal in the franchise's 112-year history to hit 30 or more home runs in four consecutive years.
- August 6 – The Colorado Rockies send Larry Walker and a minor leaguer to the St. Louis Cardinals in exchange for Luis Martinez and Chris Narveson.
- August 7 – Greg Maddux of the Chicago Cubs defeats the San Francisco Giants 8-4, to earn his 300th career victory.
- August 8 – At Comerica Park, the Boston Red Sox outslug the Detroit Tigers 11-9, despite knuckleballer Tim Wakefield giving up a record-tying six home runs. Wakefield becomes the sixth pitcher since 1900 to yield six homers in a game, but the first since George Caster of the Philadelphia Athletics against the Red Sox on September 24, 1940. The others are Larry Benton (New York Giants, 1930), Sloppy Thurston (Brooklyn Dodgers, 1932), Bill Kerksieck (Philadelphia Phillies, 1939) and Al Thomas (St. Louis Browns, 1936). Both teams combine for 10 homers. For Boston, Kevin Youkilis homers twice and David Ortiz belts one. For Detroit, Iván Rodríguez and Eric Munson each connect twice, and one each to Carlos Peña, Dmitri Young and Craig Monroe. In 1886, Charlie Sweeney of the St. Louis Maroons in the National League gave up seven homers in a game, according to the Elias Sports Bureau.
- August 10 – At Great American Ball Park, Adam Dunn of the Cincinnati Reds hits the first home run ever to land in another state. Against José Lima of the Los Angeles Dodgers, Dunn hits a ball that exits the ballpark in center field and bounces onto Mehring Way, which runs between GABP and the Ohio River. The ball then bounces onto a piece of driftwood in the river, which is considered Kentucky territory. Despite Dunn's blast, which is measured at 535 feet (to date, the longest in the stadium's history), the Dodgers defeat the Reds 4-2.
- August 11 – Randy Wolf homers twice and throws seven solid innings to lead the Philadelphia Phillies to a 15-4 victory over Colorado. Wolf, who has four career homers, goes 3-for-3 and scored three runs.
- August 16 – Chipper Jones of the Atlanta Braves hits the 300th home run of his career in a 5-4 victory over the San Diego Padres.
- August 17 – Mark Teixeira becomes the second player in Texas Rangers history – and the first in more than 19 years – to hit for the cycle, leading Texas to a 16-4 rout of the visiting Cleveland Indians. He goes 4-for-5 and drives in a career-high seven runs for the club's first cycle since Oddibe McDowell accomplished the feat on July 23, 1985, against the Indians at Arlington Stadium. Teixeira is the fifth player to hit for the cycle this season.
- August 25 – The Cuban team defeats the Australia team, 6–2, in the final of the 2004 Summer Olympics Baseball tournament.
- August 26 – At Safeco Field, the Seattle Mariners' Ichiro Suzuki belts a leadoff home run in the ninth inning for his 200th hit in 2004, reaching the mark in fewer games than any player since 1930. In that season, Bill Terry of the New York Giants reached 200 in the Giants' 119th game, while Chuck Klein of the Philadelphia Phillies collected No. 200 in game No. 125. With the hit, which snaps an 0-for-11 slide, Ichiro becomes the first player in major league history to record at least 200 hits in each of his first four seasons. He hit 242 in 2001, 208 in 2002, and 212 in 2003.
- August 29 – Pabao of Willemstad, Curaçao wins the 2004 Little League World Series.
- August 31 – Omar Vizquel goes 6-for-7 to tie the AL record for most hits in a nine-inning game as the Cleveland Indians roll to a 22-0 rout of the New York Yankees, who endure the worst shutout loss in league history. The only other players with seven hits in a nine-inning game are Rennie Stennett (Pittsburgh in 1975) and Wilbert Robinson (Orioles in 1892). Cleveland matches the largest shutout in the majors since 1900, set by the Pittsburgh Pirates against the Chicago Cubs on September 16, 1975. Prior to this, the Yankees had never lost by more than 18 runs, falling 24-6 at Cleveland on July 29, 1928, and 19-1 at home against the Detroit Tigers on June 17, 1925. Previously, the Yankees' biggest shutout loss was 15-0 at home against the Chicago White Sox on May 4, 1950. Cleveland sets a team record for largest shutout win, topping its 19-0 rout of the Boston Red Sox on May 18, 1955.

=== September ===
- September 6 – Keith Ramsey of the Kinston Indians in the Carolina League tosses a perfect game against the Myrtle Beach Pelicans.
- September 9 – Joe Randa becomes the first player in AL history to have six hits and six runs in the same nine-inning game in the Kansas City Royals' 26-5 victory over the Detroit Tigers in the first game of a doubleheader.
- September 17 – The San Francisco Giants' Barry Bonds becomes just the third player in major league history to hit 700 career home runs. Bonds joins the select company of Hall of Famers Hank Aaron (755) and Babe Ruth (714) when he connects on an 0-1 slider from San Diego Padres hurler Jake Peavy in the third inning.
- September 17 – At Safeco Field, the Seattle Mariners defeat the Oakland Athletics 6-3. Rookie Greg Dobbs' three-run pinch-hit double starts Seattle's five-run seventh inning. Meanwhile, Edgar Martínez gets his 1,000th career RBI as a designated hitter – a record for RBI at the position – and Ichiro Suzuki breaks the major league record with his 199th single of the season in the seventh. He betters the mark of 198 set by Lloyd Waner of the Pittsburgh Pirates in 1927.
- September 18 – The St. Louis Cardinals become the first major league team to clinch a playoff spot this season, winning the NL Central Division for the third time in five seasons. A few hours after the Cardinals beat the Arizona Diamondbacks 7-0, the playoff berth is clinched when the San Francisco Giants lose to the San Diego Padres 5-1. When the Chicago Cubs lose 6-5 at the Cincinnati Reds, the division title is assured.
- September 18 to September 19 – The players from Nippon Professional Baseball launch the first strike in NPB history after an unsuccessful negotiation centering on the proposed merger of the Osaka Kintetsu Buffaloes and the Orix BlueWave, which is considered a steppingstone to merging the Pacific League and Central League. The strike lasts for two days, during which all professional and minor teams' games are suspended.
- September 20 – The Minnesota Twins clinch the AL Central Division with an 8-2 victory over the Chicago White Sox. The Twins do what no other Twins team does. They win three consecutive division titles and have four consecutive winning seasons.
- September 22 – Raúl Ibañez of the Seattle Mariners ties an AL record with six hits in Seattle's 16-6 victory over the Anaheim Angels.
- September 23 – The NPB player dispute officially ends when the owners make an agreement with players to allow a new team to join the Pacific League and fill the void caused by the merger of the Buffaloes and Blue Wave in the 2005 season to form the Orix Buffaloes. The Tohoku Rakuten Golden Eagles later become the team to fill the place.
- September 26 – The Boston Red Sox complete their home schedule by selling out all 81 games. The only other teams to do that are Cleveland (1996 through 2000), Colorado (1996) and San Francisco (2000).
- September 27 – The Boston Red Sox clinch their second straight trip to the postseason, beating the Tampa Bay Devil Rays 7-3.
- September 29 – Major League Baseball announces that the Montreal Expos move to the Washington, D.C. area for the 2005 season. That night, the Expos play their final home game in front of 30,000+ fans. The Expos lose to the Florida Marlins 9-1.
- September 30
  - Bernie Williams hits a two-run homer in the ninth inning as the New York Yankees clinch their seventh consecutive AL East Division title, beating the Minnesota Twins 6-4 for their 100th victory of the season. The Yankees become just the fourth team in baseball history to post three consecutive 100-win seasons, joining the Atlanta Braves (1997-99), Baltimore Orioles (1969-71) and Philadelphia Athletics (1929-31).
  - David Ortiz and Manny Ramírez of the Boston Red Sox become the first pair of American League teammates since New York Yankees' Babe Ruth and Lou Gehrig in 1931 to both bat .300 with 40 home runs and 100 runs batted in. The feat is accomplished only 11 other times.

=== October ===
- October 1 – Ichiro Suzuki surpasses George Sisler's 84-year-old record of 257 hits in a single season. After this game, Ichiro collects 259 hits in the season with two games left; he finishes the season with 262 hits.
- October 2
  - The Anaheim Angels clinch their first AL West Division title in 18 years with a 5-4 victory over the Oakland Athletics. The Angels also earn their first playoff berth since 2002, when they win the World Series as the wild card. The Angels, who trail Oakland by one game four days before, are tied for first place when the three-game series starts, and many expect the race to come down to the last day of the season; but Anaheim ends the suspense with two consecutive victories.
  - Steve Finley's walk-off grand slam caps a seven-run rally in the bottom of the ninth inning, and the Los Angeles Dodgers win the NL West Division title by beating the San Francisco Giants 7-3. The Dodgers and the Angels both qualify for the postseason in the same year for the first time ever.
- October 3
  - The Houston Astros clinch a berth in the playoffs with their 18th consecutive home victory by beating the Colorado Rockies 5-3 to win the NL wild card. Houston wins the final seven games of the regular season and nine of the last 10 to complete an amazing late-season push for the playoffs under manager Phil Garner, who replaces Jimy Williams at the All-Star break. The Astros are a season-worst 56-60 on August 14. Since then, the team compiles a major league-best 36-10.
  - The Montreal Expos conclude their 36-year history by losing to the New York Mets 8-1 at Shea Stadium, the franchise's final game before its move to Washington, D.C. Endy Chávez is the final player to bat for the Expos, grounding out for the game's final out. Ironically, the Expos had also played their very first game at Shea Stadium, defeating the Mets 11-10 on April 8, 1969.
- October 8 – At Fenway Park, David Ortiz homers in the 10th inning to send the Boston Red Sox to their second consecutive ALCS, completing a three-game sweep of the Anaheim Angels with an 8-6 victory.
- October 9 – At Minnesota, the New York Yankees rally for four runs to tie the game in the eighth, then push across the winning run in the 11th on a wild pitch. The 6-5 win against the Minnesota Twins gives them a 3-1 AL Division Series victory and sends them back to Yankee Stadium, where they open against the Boston Red Sox in the best-of-seven ALCS.
- October 10 – The St. Louis Cardinals advance to the NLCS for the third time in five years, beating the Los Angeles Dodgers 6-2 to win their first-round playoff 3-1.
- October 11 – The Houston Astros post a 12-3 triumph over the Atlanta Braves in the decisive fifth game of the NLDS. Winning a postseason series for the first time in the 43-year history of the franchise, the Astros earn a spot in the best-of-seven NLCS against the St. Louis Cardinals.
- October 20 – At Yankee Stadium, the Boston Red Sox pull off one of the greatest comebacks ever, beating the New York Yankees four consecutive times after losing the first three games of the ALCS.
- October 21 – At home, the St. Louis Cardinals advance to the 2004 World Series after a Game 7 victory over the Houston Astros.
- October 24 – The Red Sox win 6-2 at Fenway Park behind Curt Schilling, to take the Series lead 2-0. Schilling goes 6 innings, giving up only 1 run (not earned) and only 4 hits, while striking out 4.
- October 26 – Takashi Ishii goes six strong innings and Alex Cabrera hits a towering two-run homer as the Seibu Lions defeat the Chunichi Dragons 7-2 in Game 7 of the Japan Series to win their first championship since 1992. The ball bounces off the glass-enclosed private boxes above the left field seats. It is Cabrera's third home run of the Series. The former Arizona Diamondbacks player also has a grand slam and a two-run homer in Game 3. For his part, Ishii is selected the Series Most Valuable Player.
- October 27 – The Boston Red Sox complete a four-game sweep of the St. Louis Cardinals to win the World Series for the first time since 1918.

=== November ===
- November – The independent Atlantic League of Professional Baseball announces former Major Leaguer Tom Herr as the manager of the Lancaster Barnstormers.
- November 9 – Roger Clemens of the Houston Astros grabbed his 7th Cy Young Award, but the first in the National League. At age 42, he won 18 games and struck out 218 batters.
- November 10 – Johan Santana of the Minnesota Twins won the American League Cy Young Award. Santana got all of the 28 available first-place votes while winning 20 games and struck out 265 batters.
- November 22 – The recently relocated Washington, D.C. National League franchise announces its new name, logo and colors. Using the official 1905–1955 nickname of the district's team which uses the nickname the Senators from 1901 to 1904, and again from 1956 to 1971, the club clad in red, white, blue and gold is known as the Nationals.
- November 26 – Vladimir Guerrero, who hit .337 with 39 home runs and 126 RBI, earned the American League MVP Award, while receiving 21 of the 28 first-place votes. The former Montreal Expos outfielder had signed as a free agent with the Anaheim Angels after the New York Mets refused to guarantee his salary based on advice from their medical staff.

=== December ===
- December 8 – Finally, Major League Baseball Players Association officials report that they are closer to an agreement on a drug-testing program that will incorporate more tests‚ and stiffer penalties. MLBPA executive director Donald Fehr says he expects the plan to be in place by spring training.
- December 15 – Pedro Martínez signs a 4-year, $53 million contract with the New York Mets.

== Movies ==
- Hustle (TV)
- Mickey
- Mr. 3000
- Still, We Believe: The Boston Red Sox Movie
- Up for Grabs

== Births ==
=== January ===
- January 4 – Gabriel González
- January 13 – Justin Crawford
- January 17 – Jedixson Paez
- January 25 – Walbert Ureña
- January 27 – Esmerlyn Valdez

=== February ===
- February 8 – Denzer Guzman
- February 13 – Leo Bernal

=== March ===
- March 11 – Jackson Chourio
- March 11 – Héctor Rodríguez

=== April ===
- April 1 – Pedro Ramírez
- April 3 – Welinton Herrera

=== May ===
- May 13 – Roman Anthony
- May 19 – Ángel Genao

=== July ===
- July 6 – Kade Anderson

=== August ===
- August 10 – A. J. Ewing
- August 13 – Samuel Basallo
- August 18 – Kevin McGonigle
- August 18 – Cooper Pratt

=== October ===
- October 20 – Bryce Eldridge
- October 22 – Lázaro Montes

=== November ===
- November 3 – Michael Arroyo
- November 17 – Luis Lara

=== December ===
- December 21 – Max Clark

== Deaths ==
=== January ===
- January 2 – Lynn Cartwright, 76, actress who performed as the older version of Geena Davis' character in the 1992 film A League of Their Own.
- January 2 – Paul Hopkins, 99, oldest living major leaguer at the time of his death, who is best known as the pitcher who gave up Babe Ruth's record-tying 59th home run in 1927.
- January 3 – Leon Wagner, 69, three-time All-Star left fielder in a 12-year career with five teams, notably the Los Angeles Angels (1961–1963) and Cleveland Indians (1964–1967), who had two seasons of 30 home runs and 100 RBI, and was named MVP of the 1962 MLB All–Star Game.
- January 5 – Tug McGraw, 59, All-Star relief pitcher for the Mets and Phillies who held the National League's career saves record for left-handers (180) until 1990, and was on the mound when the Phillies won their first World Series title in 1980.
- January 10 – Ewald Pyle, 93, left-handed pitcher who appeared in 67 games for the St. Louis Browns (1939, 1942), Washington Senators (1943), New York Giants (1944–1945) and Boston Braves (1945).
- January 13 – Mike Goliat, 82, second baseman on the Phillies 1950 pennant-winning Whiz Kids.
- January 15 – Jim Devlin, 81, Cleveland Indians catcher whose lone MLB game, on April 27, 1944, saw him go hitless in one at bat and play errorless ball in three innings behind the dish.
- January 15 – Gus Suhr, 98, Pittsburgh Pirates All-Star who set a National League record with 822 consecutive games played by a first baseman from 1931 to 1937, then he had a three-day absence so he could attend his mother's funeral, as the record stood for 20 years, when it was broken by St. Louis Cardinals' Stan Musial in 1957.
- January 17 – Harry Brecheen, 89, All-Star pitcher for the St. Louis Cardinals, who was 3–0 with a 0.45 ERA in the 1946 World Series, clinching the title with a Game 7 relief win; spent 15 seasons (1953–1967) as pitching coach for St. Louis Browns/Baltimore Orioles.
- January 17 – Hersh Freeman, 75, relief pitcher who went 30–16 (3.74) with 36 saves over six seasons spanning 1952 to 1958 for three clubs, principally the Cincinnati Redlegs.
- January 20 – Marie Wegman, 78, All-Star infielder/outfielder in the All-American Girls Professional Baseball League.
- January 21 – Johnny Blatnik, 82, outfielder who played from 1948 to 1950 for the Philadelphia Phillies and St. Louis Cardinals.

=== February ===
- February 10 – Hub Kittle, 86, MLB coach for Houston Astros (1971–1975) and St. Louis Cardinals (1981–1983); pitching coach for 1982 World Series champion Redbirds; as a minor league pitcher, he appeared on the mound at least once in six decades; also a minor league manager and executive.
- February 15 – Lawrence Ritter, 81, author of numerous books on baseball, including The Glory of Their Times.
- February 16 – Charlie Fox, 82, player, coach, manager, scout and executive; had a three-game "cup of coffee" as a catcher with 1942 New York Giants; as manager, he helmed the San Francisco Giants from May 24, 1970 to June 27, 1974, and led them to the 1971 NL West title, when he was named The Sporting News MLB Manager of the Year; later served as interim skipper of the 1976 Montreal Expos and 1983 Chicago Cubs; general manager of the Expos during the 1977 and 1978 seasons.
- February 22 – Andy Seminick, 83, catcher for Philadelphia Phillies and Cincinnati Redlegs who played 1,304 games over 15 seasons (1943–1957); National League All-Star (1949); last surviving everyday player for the Phillies' 1950 "Whiz Kids".

=== March ===
- March 2 – Marge Schott, 75, owner of the Cincinnati Reds from 1984 to 1999 who often provoked controversy with her social views.
- March 4 – Meryle Fitzgerald, 79, All-American Girls Professional Baseball League ballplayer.
- March 6 – John Henry Williams, 35, son of Hall of Famer Ted Williams who began a brief minor league career at age 33.
- March 15 – Vedie Himsl, 86, minor league pitcher and manager and longtime employee of Chicago Cubs; first "head coach", in 1961, of the Cubs' controversial "College of Coaches" experiment; later, served as the team's scouting director.
- March 17 – Craig F. Cullinan Jr., 78, Texas oilman and, in 1962, a founding co-owner and first club president of the Houston Colt .45s (the Astros since 1965).
- March 18 – Gene Bearden, 83, pitcher who employed the knuckleball in a remarkable 1948 rookie season for the Indians, winning 20 games, leading the AL in ERA and earning a save in the final World Series game.
- March 27 – Bob Cremins, 98, pitcher who made four relief appearances for the 1927 Boston Red Sox.
- March 27 – Alice Haylett, 80, AAGPBL All-Star pitcher.
- March 29 – Al Cuccinello, 89, reserve second baseman for the 1935 New York Giants who hit a home run in his first game at the Polo Grounds; longtime scout; elder brother of Tony Cuccinello.

=== April ===
- April 4 – George Bamberger, 80, manager of the Milwaukee Brewers (1978–1980, 1985–1986) and New York Mets (1982–1983); successful Baltimore Orioles pitching coach (1968–1977); won 213 games as a minor league pitcher, mainly in the Pacific Coast League, with brief MLB stints with the New York Giants (1951–1952) and Orioles (1959).
- April 6 – Lou Berberet, 74, catcher for four AL teams who posted a perfect fielding average for the 1957 Washington Senators.
- April 6 – Ken Johnson, 81, left-handed pitcher who threw a one-hitter for the Cardinals in his first major league start (1947).
- April 12 – Frank Seward, 83, who pitched in 26 career games for the 1943–1944 New York Giants.
- April 19 – Sam Nahem, 88, pitcher whose 90 MLB appearances came in four seasons over an 11-year span, as a member of the 1938 Brooklyn Dodgers, 1941 St. Louis Cardinals, and 1942 and 1948 Philadelphia Phillies.
- April 28 – Floyd Giebell, 94, pitcher for the Detroit Tigers who, in his third career start, shut out Bob Feller and the Cleveland Indians to clinch the 1940 American League pennant; won only two other contests in his 28-game MLB career.

=== May ===
- May 2 – Moe Burtschy, 82, relief pitcher for the Philadelphia/Kansas City Athletics from 1950 to 1956.
- May 3 – Darrell Johnson, 75, manager of the Boston Red Sox from 1974 to July 18, 1976, including their 1975 AL champions, who later became the Seattle Mariners' first manager (1977 to August 3, 1980); helmed the Texas Rangers for final 66 games of 1982 season; as a player, a journeyman, backup catcher who got into 134 games for six teams over all or part of seven years; longtime coach and scout.
- May 9 – Wayne McLeland, 79, pitcher who worked in ten games for the 1951–1952 Detroit Tigers.
- May 17 – Buster Narum, 63, pitcher who won 14 games for the 1964–1967 Washington Senators; hit a home run in his first career at bat with the Baltimore Orioles on May 3, 1963.

=== June ===
- June 3 – Joe Cleary, 85, pitcher, the last native of Ireland to play in a major league game.
- June 4 – Wilmer Fields, 81, pitcher/outfielder who was a household name in the Negro leagues and other baseball circuits between the 1940s and 1950s, winning seven MVP Awards throughout the course of his distinguished career.
- June 8 – Mack Jones, 65, outfielder for Milwaukee/Atlanta Braves, Cincinnati Reds and Montreal Expos over ten seasons between 1961 and 1971, who smacked the first major league home run hit in Canada.
- June 16 – Rob Derksen, 44, Baltimore Orioles scout and former minor league pitcher, manager and coach who became a respected figure in international baseball; coach of 1996 Australian Olympic baseball team and, at the time of his death, the 2004 Greek Olympic baseball team, when he suffered a fatal heart attack during a scouting trip prior to the Olympiad.
- June 16 – George Hausmann, 88, second baseman in 285 games for the New York Giants in 1944–1945, who was suspended for jumping to the outlaw Mexican League; upon reinstatement, played 16 more games with 1949 Giants.
- June 28 – Hal Toenes, 86, pitcher who worked in three games for the 1947 Washington Senators.

=== July ===
- July 9 – Tony Lupien, 87, first baseman for three teams who later managed in the minor leagues and coached at Dartmouth for 21 years.
- July 10 – Art Rebel, 90, outfielder/pinch hitter who appeared in 33 MLB games for 1938 Philadelphia Phillies and 1945 St. Louis Cardinals.
- July 13 – Betty Luna, 77, All-American Girls Professional Baseball League pitcher who posted a 74-70 record with a 2.12 ERA and hurled two no-hitters.
- July 26 – Rubén Gómez, 77, pitcher for the Giants who in 1954 became the first Puerto Rican to win a World Series game.

=== August ===
- August 3 – Bob Murphy, 79, broadcaster for the New York Mets for 42 years (1962–2003); enshrined in the Hall of Fame broadcasters' wing as a Ford Frick Award winner; previously worked for the Red Sox (1954–1959) and Orioles (1960–1961).
- August 4 – Jeanne Gilchrist, 78, Canadian catcher who played for the Peoria Redwings of the All-American Girls Professional Baseball League.
- August 11 – Joe Falls, 76, sportswriter for various Detroit newspapers since 1953, also a Sporting News columnist; winner of the J.G. Taylor Spink Award.
- August 22 – Louella Daetweiler, 86, catcher for the Rockford Peaches of the All-American Girls Professional Baseball League.
- August 23 – Hank Borowy, 88, pitcher whose acquisition from the New York Yankees was key to the Chicago Cubs' winning the 1945 National League pennant; last hurler to get four decisions in a World Series, going 2–2 for the 1945 Cubs against Detroit; 1944 American League All-Star.
- August 25 – Hal Epps, 90, centerfielder who appeared in 125 MLB games over four seasons between 1938 and 1944 for the St. Louis Cardinals, St. Louis Browns and Philadelphia Athletics.
- August 27 – Willie Crawford, 57, outfielder, primarily for the Dodgers, who hit .304 for the 1976 Cardinals.

=== September ===
- September 3 – Frenchy Uhalt, 94, outfielder for Chicago White Sox in 1934.
- September 7 – Bob Boyd, 84, first baseman who was the first black player to sign with the White Sox, and the first 20th-century Oriole to hit over .300.
- September 7 – Hal Reniff, 66, relief pitcher for the Yankees who saved 18 games in 1963.
- September 9 – Rose Gacioch, 89, an outstanding outfielder and pitcher in the heyday of the All-American Girls Professional Baseball League.
- September 15 – Nalda Bird, 77, All-American Girls Professional Baseball League pitcher, who hurled complete game shutouts in both games of a doubleheader (1945), to join Ed Reulbach (National League, 1908) and Bill Foster (Negro leagues, 1926) as the only pitchers ever to have achieved the feat in baseball history.

=== October ===
- October 3 – Ken Brondell, 82, pitcher who made seven appearances for 1944 New York Giants.
- October 3 – John Cerutti, 44, pitcher (1985–1990) and broadcaster (1997 until his death) for the Toronto Blue Jays who won 11 games for the 1989 division champions.
- October 6 – Norm Schlueter, 88, catcher for the 1938–1939 Chicago White Sox and 1944 Cleveland Indians who appeared in 118 career MLB games.
- October 8 – Tony Giuliani, 91, catcher who played 243 MLB games between 1936 and 1943 for the St. Louis Browns, Washington Senators and Brooklyn Dodgers.
- October 8 – Johnny Sturm, 88, first baseman who played only one season in MLB; appeared in 124 games for 1941 New York Yankees and batted only .239 with three home runs, but started all five games of the 1941 World Series, hit .286, and played errorless ball at first base to win a world championship ring.
- October 10 – Ken Caminiti, 41, All-Star third baseman who won the NL's 1996 MVP award and three Gold Gloves; made news in 2002 with admission of steroid use and allegations of their prevalence in major leagues.
- October 13 – Mike Blyzka, 75, pitcher for the St. Louis Browns and Baltimore Orioles from 1953 to 1954, and one of 17 players involved in the largest transaction in major league history.
- October 17 – Ray Boone, 81, third baseman, shortstop and first baseman who played principally for the Cleveland Indians (1948–1953) and Detroit Tigers (1953–1958); two-time (1954 and 1956) American League All-Star; patriarch of three-generation major league family which includes son Bob and grandsons Bret and Aaron; also a longtime scout.
- October 20 – Chuck Hiller, 70, second baseman for four NL teams who was that league's first player to hit a grand slam in the World Series (1962, as a San Francisco Giant); longtime coach.
- October 21 – Jim Bucher, 93, infielder/outfielder for the Brooklyn Dodgers, St. Louis Cardinals and Boston Red Sox between 1934 and 1945.
- October 24 – Bethany Goldsmith, 77, All-American Girls Professional Baseball League pitcher.
- October 26 – Bobby Ávila, 80, Mexican All-Star second baseman for the Cleveland Indians who won the AL batting title in 1954, the first Hispanic player to do so; became president of the Mexican League.
- October 26 – Russ Derry, 88, outfielder who played in 187 career games for the New York Yankees (1944–1945), Philadelphia Athletics (1946) and St. Louis Cardinals (1949).

=== November ===
- November 4 – Dee Phillips, 85, third baseman in 170 games for Cincinnati Reds (1942) and Boston Braves (1944 and 1946) who became a longtime scout.
- November 14 – Jesse Gonder, 68, catcher and pinch-hitter for five teams, most notably the 1963–65 Mets; won a batting title in Pacific Coast League.
- November 16 – Floyd Baker, 88, infielder who played in 874 games for five teams between 1943 and 1955, including 1944 St. Louis Browns' American League champs; later a coach and longtime scout for Minnesota Twins.
- November 19 – Brian Traxler, 37, first baseman for the 1990 Los Angeles Dodgers.
- November 26 – Tom Haller, 67, All-Star catcher for the Giants and Dodgers, later Giants' general manager from 1981 to 1986; brother Bill was longtime AL umpire.
- November 28 – Connie Johnson, 81, All-Star pitcher for the Negro leagues' Kansas City Monarchs, later with the White Sox and Orioles.
- November 29 – Harry Danning, 93, four-time All-Star catcher for the New York Giants who batted .300 three times during an 890-game MLB career that lasted from 1933 to 1942.

=== December ===
- December 10 – Ed Sudol, 84, National League umpire from 1957 to 1977 who worked three World Series and was behind the plate for Jim Bunning's perfect game (1964) and three Mets games of 23 or more innings.
- December 13 – Andre Rodgers, 70, shortstop for the New York/San Francisco Giants (1957–1960), Chicago Cubs (1961–1964) and Pittsburgh Pirates (1965–1967), who was the first Bahamian major leaguer; former cricket player who learned baseball at a Giants tryout.
- December 14 – Danny Doyle, 87, scout for the Red Sox since 1949 who signed Roger Clemens; briefly a catcher for the 1943 team.
- December 14 – Rod Kanehl, 70, second baseman and outfielder for the 1962–1964 New York Mets who hit the team's first-ever grand slam.
- December 15 – Larry Ponza, 86, pitching machine innovator.
- December 16 – Ted Abernathy, 71, submarining relief pitcher who led the National League in saves in 1965 and 1967; compiled 149 career saves for seven MLB teams in 14 seasons between 1955 and 1972.
- December 16 – Bobby Mattick, 89, longtime scout who managed the 1980–1981 Toronto Blue Jays; previously a shortstop for the Chicago Cubs and Cincinnati Reds between 1938 and 1942.
- December 22 – Doug Ault, 54, first baseman for the Toronto Blue Jays who hit two home runs in the franchise's first game in 1977.
- December 23 – Wilmer Harris, 80, pitcher for the Negro leagues' Philadelphia Stars.
- December 24 – Johnny Oates, 58, manager who led the Rangers to their only three playoff appearances in 1996, '98 and '99; also managed Orioles, and was catcher with five teams.
- December 26 – Eddie Layton, 79, organist for the New York Yankees from 1967 to 2003.
- December 29 – Ken Burkhart, 89, National League umpire from 1957 to 1973 who worked in three World Series; earlier, an NL pitcher from 1945 to 1949, who won 18 games for the 1945 Cardinals; the last surviving umpire who also played in the majors.
- December 29 – Gus Niarhos, 84, catcher for four teams, most notably the Yankees; later a minor league manager and MLB coach for the Kansas City Athletics.
- December 31 – Joe Durso, 80, sportswriter for The New York Times since 1950, and author of several baseball books.
