= 1946 San Francisco Seals season =

1946 San Francisco Seals
- League: Pacific Coast League
- Ballpark: Seals Stadium
- City: San Francisco
- Record: 115–68
- League place: 1st
- Managers: Lefty O'Doul

The 1946 San Francisco Seals season was the 44th season in the history of the San Francisco Seals baseball team. The team compiled a 115–68 record and won the PCL pennant. Lefty O'Doul was in his 12th season as the team's manager. Playing its home games at Seals Stadium, the Seals led the PCL in attendance with paid admissions of 670,563, an increase of more than 240,000 over the prior year.

In the Governor's Cup semi-final playoffs, the Seals swept the Hollywood Stars, four games to zero. In the finals, they defeated the Oakland Oaks, four games to two. With the victory over the Oaks, the Seals won their fourth consecutive Governor's Cup.

== Pitchers ==
Pitcher Larry Jansen, an Oregon native, led the PCL with 30 wins, a 1.57 earned run average (ERA), an .833 winning percentage, and 31 complete games. He also tallied 171 strikeouts. Jansen joined the New York Giants in 1947 and remained with that club for eight seasons.

Cliff Melton was San Francisco's No. 2 pitcher, compiling a 17–12 record and a 2.83 ERA.

== Position players ==
First baseman Ferris Fain, who grew up across the Bay in Oakland, California, led the PCL with 112 RBIs, compiled a .301 batting average, and led the Seals with 11 home runs and 117 runs scored. After the season, Fain was drafted by the Philadelphia Athletics. Fain went on to play nine seasons in the majors from 1947 to 1955.

Second baseman Hugh Luby led the team in hits with 199. Luby was one of the most durable players in PCL history. He set a PCL record playing in 866 consecutive games with the Oakland Oaks between 1939 and 1943.

Vince DiMaggio, older brother of Joe DiMaggio who played 10 years in the majors from 1937 to 1946, appeared in 43 games for the Seals.

== 1946 PCL standings ==
Team	W	L	Pct.	GB
San Francisco Seals	115	68	.628	--
Oakland Oaks	111	72	.607	4.0
Hollywood Stars	95	88	.519	20.0
Los Angeles Angels	94	89	.514	21.0
Sacramento Solons	94	92	.505	22.5
San Diego Padres	78	108	.419	38.5
Seattle Rainiers	74	109	.404	41.0
Portland Beavers	74	109	.404	41.0

== Statistics ==
=== Batting ===
Note: Pos = Position; G = Games played; AB = At bats; H = Hits; Avg. = Batting average; HR = Home runs; RBI = Runs batted in

Pos	Player	G	AB	H	Avg.	HR	RBI
3B	Ted Jennings	136	495	150	.303	3	53
1B	Ferris Fain	180	615	185	.301	11	112
2B	Hugh Luby	176	678	199	.294	2	60
CF, LF	Don White	159	553	159	.288	4	90
CF	Frenchy Uhalt	137	520	137	.263	1	24
RF	Neill Sheridan	116	357	96	.269	5	55
SS	Roy Nicely	133	446	98	.220	1	46
RF	Sal Taormina	112	357	91	.255	4	69
C	Bruce Ogrodowski	114	312	76	.244	0	34
CF	Vince DiMaggio	43	129	34	.265	1	21

=== Pitching ===
Note: G = Games pitched; IP = Innings pitched; W = Wins; L = Losses; PCT = Win percentage; ERA = Earned run average; SO = Strikeouts

Player	G	IP	W	L	PCT	ERA	SO
Larry Jansen	38	321.0	30	6	.833	1.57	171
Cliff Melton	33	248.0	17	12	.586	2.83	99
Frank Seward	31	219.0	15	13	.536	3.12	72
Ray Harrell	34	167.0	13	6	.684	2.91	70
Bill Werle	33	175.0	12	8	.600	2.26	72
Frank Rosso	38	141.0	11	9	.550	2.68	60
