= Felipe Crespo =

Puerto Rican baseball player (born 1973)

- Outfielder
- Born: March 5, 1973 (age 53); Río Piedras, Puerto Rico
- Batted: Switch Threw: Right

Professional debut
- MLB: April 28, 1996, for the Toronto Blue Jays
- NPB: 2002, for the Yomiuri Giants

Last appearance
- MLB: September 28, 2001, for the Philadelphia Phillies
- NPB: 2002, for the Yomiuri Giants

MLB statistics
- Batting average: .245
- Home runs: 10
- Runs batted in: 68
- Stats at Baseball Reference

Teams
- Toronto Blue Jays (1996–1998); San Francisco Giants (2000–2001); Philadelphia Phillies (2001); Yomiuri Giants (2002)

Felipe Javier Crespo (born March 5, 1973) is a Puerto Rican former professional baseball utility player, who played in Major League Baseball (MLB) for three different teams between 1996 and 2001. Listed at 5'11, 195 lb., he was a switch-hitter and threw right-handed. Crespo is the older brother of César Crespo.

== Career ==
Crespo was originally drafted by the Toronto Blue Jays in the third round of the 1990 Major League Baseball draft. He began his professional career in the minor leagues in 1991, and spent the next five full seasons there. Crespo reached the majors in 1996 with the Blue Jays, playing for them until 1998 before joining the San Francisco Giants (2000-2001), and Philadelphia Phillies (2001). His most productive season came in 2000 with San Francisco, when he hit .290, with four home runs, and 29 runs batted in (RBI), in 89 games – all career-highs.

On June 7, 2001, Crespo hit two home runs for the Giants, while his brother César hit his first major league homer with the San Diego Padres, joining a select club that includes Aaron and Bret Boone, Héctor and José Cruz, Al and Tony Cuccinello, Dom and Joe DiMaggio, Graig and Jim Nettles, Rick and Wes Ferrell, and Kyle and Corey Seager. The seven sets of brothers hit their homers playing for opposing teams.

In a five-season career, Crespo was a .245 hitter (109-for-445) with 10 home runs and 68 RBI in 262 games, including 46 runs, 22 doubles, four triples, and nine stolen bases.

Following Crespo's MLB career, he played in Japan for the 2002 Yomiuri Giants of the Central League.

== See also ==
- List of Major League Baseball players from Puerto Rico
