= 2004 Big League World Series =

Tournament details
- Country: United States
- City: Easley, South Carolina
- Dates: 30 July – 7 August 2004
- Teams: 10

Final positions
- Champions: Easley, South Carolina
- Runner-up: Williamsport, Pennsylvania

The 2004 Big League World Series took place from July 30-August 7 in Easley, South Carolina, United States. Easley, South Carolina defeated Williamsport, Pennsylvania in the championship game. It was South Carolina's second straight championship.

== Teams ==
United States	International
(South Carolina) Easley, South Carolina; District 1 Host	(Guam) Yona, Guam Asia–Pacific
(Michigan) Grand Rapids, Michigan; District 9 Central	(Nova Scotia) Maritimes, Nova Scotia; Nova Scotia; Canada
(Pennsylvania) Williamsport, Pennsylvania; District 12; East	(Netherlands) Netherlands EMEA
Virginia Beach, Virginia; District 8 Southeast	(Mexico) Negales, Mexico; Bellota; Latin America
(Louisiana) Ruston, Louisiana; District 5 Southwest	
(California) Anaheim, California; District 46; West

== Results ==
Group A

Team	W	L	Rs	Ra
South Carolina	4	0	64	6
Michigan	3	1	17	28
Virginia	2	2	23	17
Netherlands	1	3	17	33
Guam	0	4	3	40

	(Guam)	(Michigan)	(Netherlands)	(South Carolina)	(Virginia)
Guam	–	0–4	0–12	2–13	1–11
Michigan	4–0	–	7–3	3–25	3–0
Netherlands	12–0	3–7	–	0–15	2–11
South Carolina	13–2	25–3	15–0	–	11–1
Virginia	11–1	0–3	11–2	1–11	–

Group B

Team	W	L	Rs	Ra
Pennsylvania	4	0	33	9
California	3	1	22	12
Louisiana	2	2	22	23
Mexico	1	3	21	25
Canada	0	4	6	35

	(California)	(Canada)	(Louisiana)	(Mexico)	(Pennsylvania)
California	–	2–0	11–0	6–5	3–7
Canada	0–2	–	3–10	3–15	0–8
Louisiana	0–11	10–3	–	6–1	6–8
Mexico	5–6	15–3	1–6	–	0–10
Pennsylvania	7–3	8–0	8–6	10–0	–

Elimination Round

Semifinals
4–0	South Carolina (F/14)	6
3–1	California	3
4–0	Pennsylvania	4
3–1	Michigan	1

World Championship
5–0	South Carolina	9
5–0	Pennsylvania	1

2004 Big League World Series Champions
District 1
Easley, South Carolina
