= Lorenzo Ponza =

Ponza

Lorenzo "Larry" J. Ponza Jr. (February 15, 1918 – December 15, 2004) was the inventor of the modern baseball pitching machine.

He grew up in the Santa Cruz area of California near a sawmill which was operated by his parents. He graduated from high school in 1934 and, according to him, continued his education in the "School of Hard Knocks and Experience". In 1941 he moved to Pearl Harbor, Hawaii and worked as a senior civilian supervisor for the US Navy's production control office.

His first pitching machine, the Power Pitcher, was invented in 1952. He followed this up with many improvements, including the 1974 Hummer, which could simulate fastballs, pop-ups and grounders, the Casey (1983), the Ponza Swing King (1987) and the Rookie (1988). He sold his company to the Athletic Training Equipment Company in the early 1990s.

He died at age 86 from a cancer-related illness. In Argentina, a popular online newspaper, Telégrafo del Sur, published a comic called "The news adventures of Lorenzo Ponza" in honor of him.
