= Walter Ockey =

American baseball player

- Pitcher
- Born: January 4, 1920; New York, New York
- Died: December 4, 1971 (aged 51); Staten Island, New York
- Batted: Right Threw: Right

MLB debut
- May 3, 1944, for the New York Giants

Last MLB appearance
- May 20, 1944, for the New York Giants

MLB statistics
- Win–loss record: 0–0
- Earned run average: 3.38
- Strikeouts: 1
- Stats at Baseball Reference

Teams
- New York Giants (1944)

Walter Andrew "Footie" Ockey (January 4, 1920 – December 4, 1971) was a Major League Baseball pitcher who appeared in two games, both in relief, for the New York Giants in 1944. The 6 ft 0 in (1.83 m), 175 lb (79 kg) right-hander was a native of New York City.

Ockey is one of many ballplayers who only appeared in the major leagues during World War II. He made his major league debut on May 3, 1944, in a home game against the Philadelphia Blue Jays at the Polo Grounds. His only other appearance was on May 20 against the St. Louis Cardinals at Sportsman's Park. Totals for his brief career include 1 game finished, 1 earned run allowed in 2 2/3 innings pitched, and an ERA of 3.38. Defensively, he recorded 2 assists without making an error. Bill Lee of the Philadelphia Phillies is the only batter Ockey struck out.

Ockey died at the age of 51 in Staten Island, New York.
