= Whitey Miller =

American baseball player

- Pitcher
- Born: May 2, 1915; St. Louis, Missouri, U.S.
- Died: April 3, 1991 (aged 75); St. Louis, Missouri, U.S.
- Batted: Right Threw: Right

MLB debut
- September 15, 1944, for the New York Giants

Last MLB appearance
- September 29, 1944, for the New York Giants

MLB statistics
- Win–loss record: 0–1
- Earned run average: 0.00
- Strikeouts: 2
- Stats at Baseball Reference

Teams
- New York Giants (1944)

Kenneth Albert "Whitey" Miller (May 2, 1915 – April 3, 1991) was an American Major League Baseball pitcher who appeared in four games, all in relief, for the New York Giants in 1944. The 29-year-old rookie stood 6 ft 1 in (1.85 m) and weighed 195 lb (88 kg).

Miller is one of many ballplayers who only appeared in the major leagues during World War II. He made his major league debut on September 15, 1944, in a road game against the Philadelphia Blue Jays at Shibe Park. His last appearance was on September 29 in a home game against the St. Louis Cardinals at the Polo Grounds. Miller was very effective in his limited big league action. In a total of 5 innings pitched he gave up 5 baserunners and 2 runs, both unearned. His brief career ended with a 0–1 record, 3 games finished, and an ERA of 0.00.
