= Bruce Sloan =

American baseball player (1914-1973)

- Pinch hitter/Right fielder
- Born: October 4, 1914; McAlester, Oklahoma
- Died: September 24, 1973 (aged 58); Oklahoma City, Oklahoma
- Batted: Left Threw: Left

MLB debut
- April 29, 1944, for the New York Giants

Last MLB appearance
- October 1, 1944, for the New York Giants

MLB statistics
- Batting average: .269
- Home runs: 1
- Runs batted in: 9
- Stats at Baseball Reference

Teams
- New York Giants (1944)

Bruce Adams Sloan (October 4, 1914 – September 24, 1973), nicknamed "Fatso", was a Major League Baseball player who played for the New York Giants in 1944. He was primarily used as a pinch hitter, but was also used as a right fielder.
