= Ray Berres =

American baseball player (1907–2007)

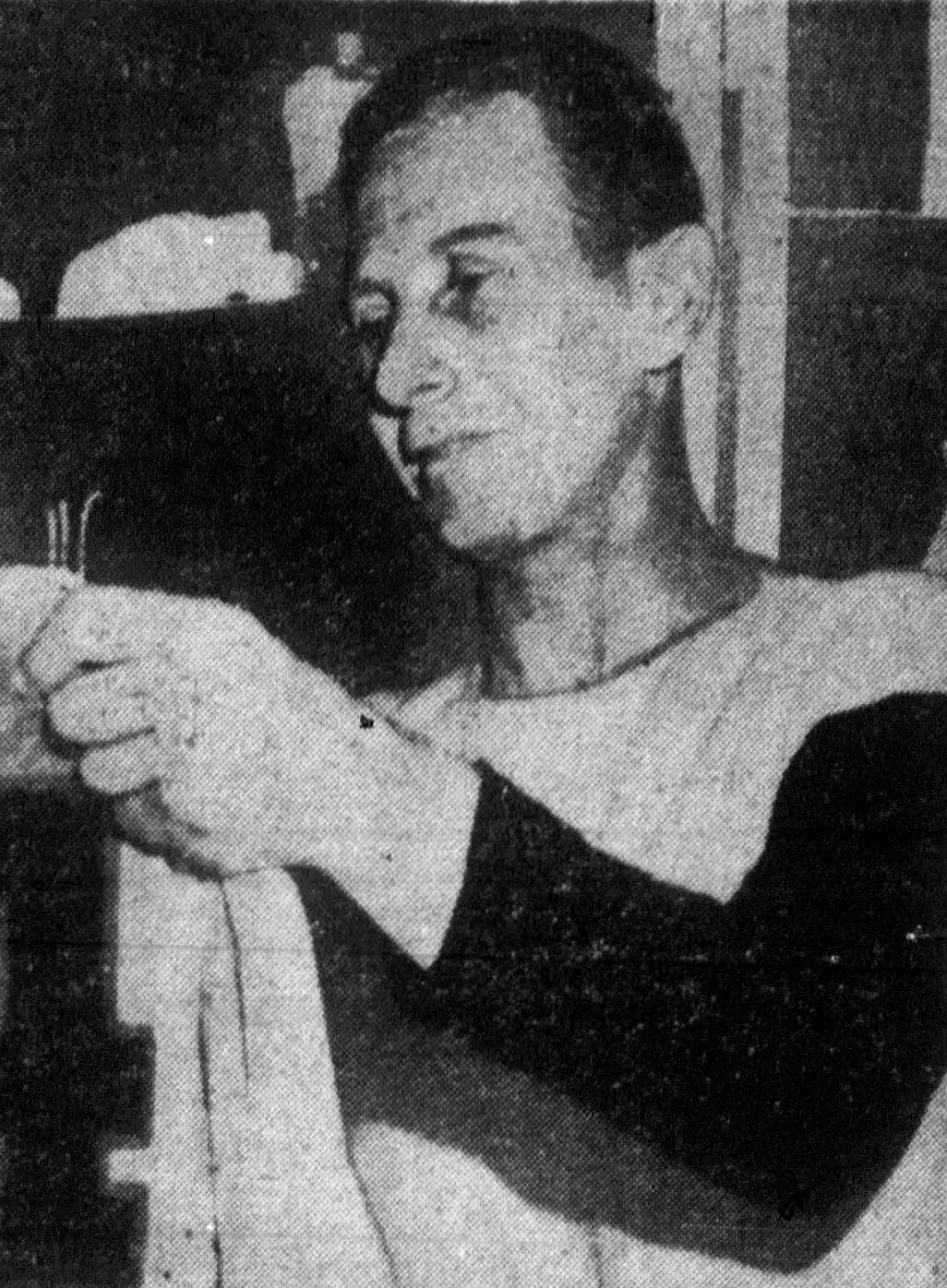
- Berres in 1954
- Catcher
- Born: August 31, 1907; Kenosha, Wisconsin, U.S.
- Died: February 1, 2007 (aged 99); Kenosha, Wisconsin, U.S.
- Batted: Right Threw: Right

MLB debut
- April 24, 1934, for the Brooklyn Dodgers

Last MLB appearance
- September 30, 1945, for the New York Giants

MLB statistics
- Batting average: .216
- Home runs: 3
- Runs batted in: 78
- Stats at Baseball Reference

Teams
- Brooklyn Dodgers (1934, 1936); Pittsburgh Pirates (1937–1940); Boston Bees / Braves (1940–1941); New York Giants (1942–1945)

Raymond Frederick Berres (August 31, 1907 – February 1, 2007) was an American professional baseball catcher and pitching coach. He played in Major League Baseball (MLB) for the Brooklyn Dodgers, Pittsburgh Pirates, Boston Bees / Braves and New York Giants.

Born in Kenosha, Wisconsin, Berres was a 5 ft 9 in (1.75 m) 170-lb, light-hitting catcher who, thanks to his fine glove, managed to play in 11 major league seasons for four National League teams, usually in a backup role. He provided fine catching, quality game-calling, and a respectable throwing arm. Drafted by the Brooklyn Dodgers from the Birmingham Barons (Southern Association) in the 1933 Rule 5 draft, he debuted with Brooklyn in 1934, backing up Al López behind the plate.

He returned to the minor leagues in 1935, but became Brooklyn's starting catcher when López was traded to Boston in December 1935. His most productive season came as a 1936 rookie, when he posted career highs in batting average (.240), hits (64) and doubles (10). The Pittsburgh Pirates, short of catching, acquired him a year later.

On June 14, 1940, Pittsburgh traded Berres to the Boston Bees in exchange for López, and he played for 11/2 seasons with Boston's National League franchise. In 1941, with the renamed Braves, Berres appeared in a career-high 120 games while hitting .201 (56-for-279); he also led the NL in fielding percentage with a .995 mark. After backing up a series of Giants catchers for four seasons, he finished his career with that team in 1945. In an 11-season career, Berres was a .216 hitter with three home runs and 78 runs batted in in 561 games played.

After serving as a bullpen catcher for the 1947 Boston Braves and a coach for the 1948 Triple-A Milwaukee Brewers, Berres was the pitching coach for the Chicago White Sox for nearly two decades (from 1949 through 1966, then from the midseason of 1968 through 1969), primarily under manager López. During that time, he was a member of the 1959 American League champions.

Tommy John pitched for Berres in the coach's last years with the White Sox. "With the White Sox, I became a pitcher," John recalled. "The key to my success was pitching coach Ray Berres. I just didn't know what I was doing as a pitcher until he got me. Berres didn't teach pitches. He didn't show you how to throw the slider, forkball, screwball, or split-fingered fastball. But he had a tremendous understanding of pitching." Berres would study pitcher's mechanics and let them know adjustments which needed to be made. According to John, Berres's theory was that "the slower and more easy your motion, the more of an optical illusion it becomes to the batter when the ball gets released."

Berres died in his hometown of Kenosha, Wisconsin from pneumonia at the age of 99. He was elected to the Wisconsin Athletic Hall of Fame in 1999.

Sporting positions
Preceded by Red Faber; Marv Grissom	Chicago White Sox pitching coach 1949–1966; 1968–1969	Succeeded by Marv Grissom; Hugh Mulcahy
