= Bob Barthelson =

American baseball player (1924-2000)

- Pitcher
- Born: July 15, 1924; New Haven, Connecticut, U.S.
- Died: April 14, 2000 (aged 75); Branford, Connecticut, U.S.
- Batted: Right Threw: Right

MLB debut
- July 4, 1944, for the New York Giants

Last MLB appearance
- September 27, 1944, for the New York Giants

MLB statistics
- Win–loss record: 1–1
- Earned run average: 4.66
- Strikeouts: 4
- Stats at Baseball Reference

Teams
- New York Giants (1944)

Robert Edward Barthelson (July 15, 1924 – April 14, 2000) was an American Major League Baseball pitcher who played for the New York Giants in 1944. The 6 ft 0 in (1.83 m), 185 lb (84 kg) right-hander graduated from Hillhouse High School.

Barthelson is one of many ballplayers who only appeared in the major leagues during World War II. At the age of 19 he made his major league debut in a 4 July doubleheader against the St. Louis Cardinals at Sportsman's Park. Three weeks later, in his only big league start, he lost to the Pittsburgh Pirates at the Polo Grounds.

In a total of seven games he was 1–1 with 5 games finished, allowing 5 earned runs in 9 2/3 innings pitched for a final ERA of 4.66.

After his brief major league career ended, Barthelson became a pitcher for the West Haven Sailors, an independent semiprofessional team in West Haven, Connecticut, that scheduled games against Negro leagues and major league teams. He also pitched for the San Francisco Seals in 1945, for the Minneapolis Millers in 1946, and for the Sacramento Solons in 1947.

Barthelson died in 2000 in Branford, Connecticut.
