= Jack Brewer (baseball) =

American baseball player (1918-2003)

- Pitcher
- Born: April 21, 1918; Los Angeles, California
- Died: November 30, 2003 (aged 85); Sun City, California
- Batted: Right Threw: Right

MLB debut
- July 15, 1944, for the New York Giants

Last MLB appearance
- April 18, 1946, for the New York Giants

MLB statistics
- Win–loss record: 9–10
- Earned run average: 4.36
- Strikeouts: 73
- Stats at Baseball Reference

Teams
- New York Giants (1944–1946)

Jack Herndon "Buddy" Brewer (April 21, 1918 – November 30, 2003) was a pitcher in Major League Baseball who played from 1944 through 1946 for the New York Giants. Listed at 6 ft 2 in (1.88 m), 170 lb (77 kg), Brewer threw and batted right-handed. He attended the University of Southern California.

In a three-season career, Brewer posted a 9–10 record with 73 strikeouts and a 4.36 ERA in 43 appearances, including 28 starts, 10 complete games, and 216 2/3 innings of work.
