= Ace Adams =

American baseball player (1910–2006)

- Pitcher
- Born: March 2, 1910; Willows, California, U.S.
- Died: February 26, 2006 (aged 95); Albany, Georgia, U.S.
- Batted: Right Threw: Right

MLB debut
- April 15, 1941, for the New York Giants

Last MLB appearance
- April 24, 1946, for the New York Giants

MLB statistics
- Win–loss record: 41–33
- Earned run average: 3.47
- Strikeouts: 171
- Saves: 49
- Stats at Baseball Reference

Teams
- New York Giants (1941–1946)

Career highlights and awards
- All-Star (1943)

Ace Townsend Adams (March 2, 1910 – February 26, 2006) was an American pitcher in Major League Baseball who played for the New York Giants (1941–1946). He also played in the Mexican League and was banned from MLB for jumping to that league. Adams batted and threw right-handed. He was born in Willows, California.

In a six-season career, Adams posted a 41–33 record with a 3.47 ERA and 49 saves in 302 games pitched. Much of his work came as a relief pitcher.

Adams died in Albany, Georgia, at age 95.

== See also ==
- List of Major League Baseball annual saves leaders
