= Red Treadway =

American baseball player (1920-1994)

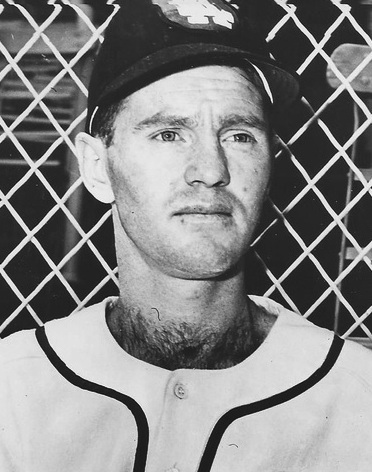
- Outfielder
- Born: April 28, 1920; Athlone, North Carolina, U.S.
- Died: May 26, 1994 (aged 74); Atlanta, Georgia, U.S.
- Batted: Left Threw: Right

MLB debut
- July 24, 1944, for the New York Giants

Last MLB appearance
- September 23, 1945, for the New York Giants

MLB statistics
- Batting average: .266
- Home runs: 4
- Runs batted in: 28
- Stats at Baseball Reference

Teams
- New York Giants (1944–45)

Thadford Leon "Red" Treadway (April 28, 1920 – May 26, 1994) was an American professional baseball player. He played two seasons in Major League Baseball in 1944-45 for the New York Giants, primarily as an outfielder. He also had an extensive career in minor league baseball, playing sixteen seasons overall from 1941-56. A native of Athlone, North Carolina, he stood 5 ft 10 in (1.78 m) and weighed 175 lbs.

Treadway is one of many ballplayers who only appeared in the major leagues during World War II. He made his major league debut on July 25, 1944 in an against the Pittsburgh Pirates at the Polo Grounds. He hit for a high average (.300) during his first season with New York, but did not hit well with men in scoring position. In 170 at bats he had only 5 runs batted in, a dismal average of one for every 34 at bats. Then, in 1945, Treadway hit only .241 in 224 at bats but had 23 RBI, an average of one for every 9.7 at bats.

Treadway's career major league totals include 138 games played, a .266 batting average (105-for-394), 4 home runs, 28 runs batted in, 54 runs scored, and an on-base percentage of .323. He was a below average defensive outfielder, making 11 errors in 211 total chances for a fielding percentage of .948.

Treadway died at the age of 74 in Atlanta.
