= Hugh Luby =

American baseball player (1913-1986)

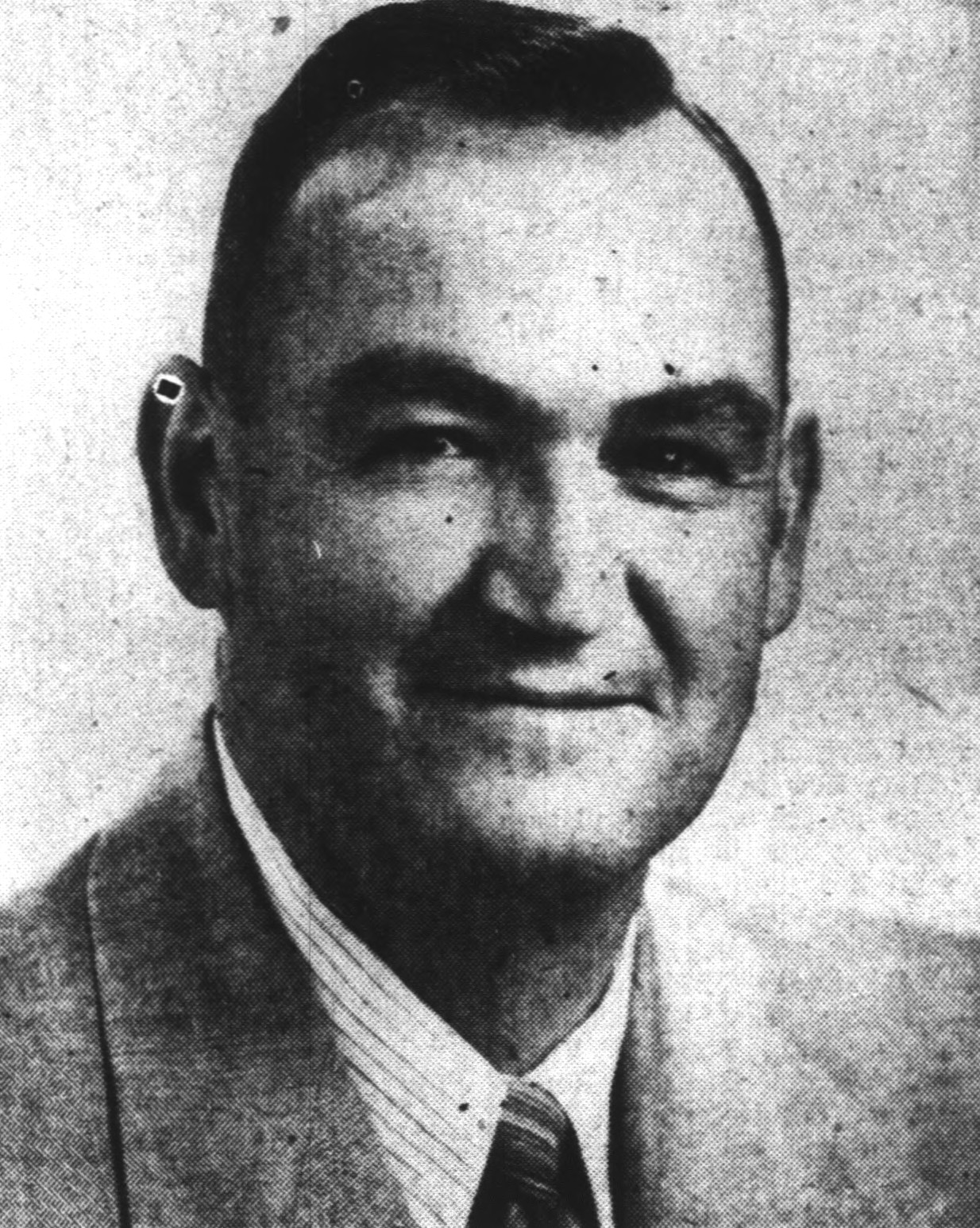
- Luby, circa 1955
- Third baseman / Second baseman
- Born: June 13, 1913; Blackfoot, Idaho, U.S.
- Died: May 4, 1986 (aged 72); Eugene, Oregon, U.S.
- Batted: Right Threw: Right

MLB debut
- September 10, 1936, for the Philadelphia Athletics

Last MLB appearance
- September 29, 1944, for the New York Giants

MLB statistics
- Batting average: .247
- Home runs: 2
- Runs batted in: 38
- Stats at Baseball Reference

Teams
- Philadelphia Athletics (1936); New York Giants (1944)

Hugh Max "Hal" Luby (June 13, 1913 – May 4, 1986) was an American professional baseball third baseman, second baseman, manager and front-office executive. Apart from two trials in Major League Baseball with the 1936 Philadelphia Athletics and the 1944 New York Giants, Luby spent his career in minor league baseball. Born in Blackfoot, Idaho, Luby grew up in Omaha, Nebraska, and briefly attended Creighton University. He threw and batted right-handed, stood 5 ft 10 in (1.78 m) tall and weighed 185 lb (84 kg).

Luby the player was a fixture in the Pacific Coast League, performing as a regular for the Oakland Oaks (1938–43) and San Francisco Seals (1946–48), and batting over .300 three times. As an Oakland Oak, Luby played in 866 consecutive games and never missed a game between 1939 and 1943. Overall, Luby played all or parts of 24 seasons in professional baseball. In 120 games for the Athletics and Giants, he batted .247 with two home runs and 89 hits in 361 at bats. All but nine of those games played occurred during the wartime 1944 season, when Luby was a member of the Giants. During his long minor league career, however, he batted .296 in 2,824 games, and amassed 3,165 hits. He is a member of the Pacific Coast League Hall of Fame.

In 1949, Luby began his off-field career as a manager in the farm system of the Pittsburgh Pirates. Named skipper of the unaffiliated Salem Senators of the Class A Western International League for 1951, Luby began a long tenure as a key figure in professional baseball in the Pacific Northwest. He served as manager and general manager of the Senators and Eugene Emeralds of the WIL, president of the Northwest League (the WIL's identity after 1954), and GM of the Emeralds when, as members of the Pacific Coast League, they were the Triple-A affiliate of the Philadelphia Phillies. He owned Luby's sporting goods store in Eugene. Hugh Luby died in Eugene, Oregon, at the age of 72; his obituary hailed him as "Eugene's Mr. Baseball".
