= Lou Polli =

American baseball player (1901-2000)

- Pitcher
- Born: July 9, 1901; Baveno, Italy
- Died: December 19, 2000 (aged 99); Berlin, Vermont, U.S.
- Batted: Right Threw: Right

MLB debut
- April 18, 1932, for the St. Louis Browns

Last MLB appearance
- July 7, 1944, for the New York Giants

MLB statistics
- Win–loss record: 0–2
- Earned run average: 4.68
- Strikeouts: 11
- Stats at Baseball Reference

Teams
- St. Louis Browns (1932); New York Giants (1944)

Louis Americo Polli (July 9, 1901 – December 19, 2000), nicknamed "Crip", was an Italian-born professional baseball relief pitcher.

Polli first played in the majors with the St. Louis Browns in 1932, pitching 6 2/3 innings with a 5.40 earned run average.

Polli would not play again in the major-leagues until 1944, a period of 12 seasons, when he pitched 35 2/3 innings for the New York Giants, with a 4.54 earned run average. Polli's MLB career ERA was 4.68.

One of the greatest pitchers in minor-league history, the lanky righthander was the first major league player born in Italy, being one of only nine Italian-born players in MLB as of 2025. Polli compiled a career minor league lifetime mark of 236–226 through 22 seasons.

At the time of his death in 2000, aged 99, Polli was the second oldest living former MLB player, behind Karl Swanson.
