= Charlie Mead =

Canadian baseball player (1921–2014)

- Outfielder
- Born: April 9, 1921; Vermilion, Alberta, Canada
- Died: May 8, 2014 (aged 93); Victorville, California, U.S.
- Batted: Left Threw: Right

MLB debut
- August 28, 1943, for the New York Giants

Last MLB appearance
- September 30, 1945, for the New York Giants

MLB statistics
- Batting average: .245
- Home runs: 3
- Runs batted in: 27
- Stats at Baseball Reference

Teams
- New York Giants (1943–1945)

Charles Richard Mead (April 9, 1921 – May 8, 2014) was a Canadian professional outfielder who played for the New York Giants of Major League Baseball (MLB) from 1943 to 1945. He stood 6'1½" and weighed 185 lbs. He was born in Vermilion, Alberta, Canada.

Mead is one of many ballplayers who only appeared in the major leagues during World War II. He made his major league debut on August 28, 1943 in a road game against the Boston Braves at Braves Field. His last game for New York was on September 30, 1945. He was released by the Giants on April 9, 1946, and never again returned to the major leagues. Mead's career totals include 87 games played, 64 hits, 3 home runs, 27 RBI, 18 runs, a .245 batting average, and a slugging percentage of .318. He was an average defensive outfielder for his era, handling 156 out of 160 total chances successfully for a fielding percentage of .975. One defensive highlight is that he participated in 6 double plays in just 71 outfield appearances. He was the last surviving teammate of Baseball Hall of Famer Mel Ott.
