= Ewald Pyle =

American baseball player (1910-2004)

- Pitcher
- Born: August 27, 1910; St. Louis, Missouri
- Died: January 10, 2004 (aged 93); DuQuoin, Illinois
- Batted: Left Threw: Left

MLB debut
- April 23, 1939, for the St. Louis Browns

Last MLB appearance
- June 30, 1945, for the Detroit Tigers

MLB statistics
- Win–loss record: 11–21
- Earned run average: 5.03
- Strikeouts: 122
- Stats at Baseball Reference

Teams
- St. Louis Browns (1939, 1942); Washington Senators (1943); New York Giants (1944–1945); Boston Braves (1945)

Ewald "Lefty" Pyle (August 27, 1910 – January 10, 2004) was a Major League Baseball pitcher. Pyle played for the St. Louis Browns in 1939 and again in 1942, and the Washington Senators, New York Giants and the Boston Braves from 1943 to 1945.
