= Frank Rosso =

American baseball player (1921-1980)

- Pitcher
- Born: March 1, 1921; Agawam, Massachusetts, U.S.
- Died: January 26, 1980 (aged 58); Springfield, Massachusetts, U.S.
- Batted: Right Threw: Right

MLB debut
- September 15, 1944, for the New York Giants

Last MLB appearance
- October 1, 1944, for the New York Giants

MLB statistics
- Win–loss record: 0–0
- Earned run average: 9.00
- Strikeouts: 1
- Stats at Baseball Reference

Teams
- New York Giants (1944)

Francis James Rosso (March 1, 1921 – January 26, 1980) was an American Major League Baseball (MLB) pitcher who pitched in two games for the New York Giants in 1944. He played in the minor leagues between 1939 and 1948, and after his playing career was a high school coach.

With a 0–0 record, Rosso sported a 9.00 ERA pitching for a total of 4 innings over 2 games. Bucky Walters of the Cincinnati Reds hold the distinction of being the only player Rosso struck out. Rosso was used as a pinch runner in his final MLB appearance.
