= Cliff Melton =

American baseball player (1912–1986)

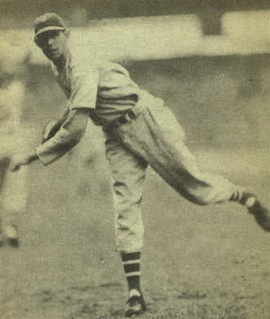
- Pitcher
- Born: January 3, 1912; Brevard, North Carolina, U.S.
- Died: July 28, 1986 (aged 74); Baltimore, Maryland, U.S.
- Batted: Left Threw: Left

MLB debut
- April 25, 1937, for the New York Giants

Last MLB appearance
- September 29, 1944, for the New York Giants

MLB statistics
- Win–loss record: 86–80
- Earned run average: 3.42
- Strikeouts: 660
- Stats at Baseball Reference

Teams
- New York Giants (1937–1944)

Career highlights and awards
- All-Star (1942)

Clifford George Melton (January 3, 1912 – July 28, 1986) was an American professional baseball left-handed pitcher, who played in Major League Baseball (MLB) for the New York Giants over parts of eight seasons spanning 1937–44. Listed at 6 ft 5.5 in (1.969 m), 203 lb (92 kg), Melton batted left-handed.

A native of Brevard, North Carolina, Melton had two different nicknames: "Mickey Mouse" and "Mountain Music". His cousin, Rube, pitched in the major leagues for six seasons.Cliff found a home for the rest of his life in Baltimore. On October 17, 1933, he married Mary Angela Anello, daughter of a Baltimore Italian-American family. They spent winters in the city during Melton’s baseball journeys, raised their three children–Mary, Clifford Jr., and Stephanie–in Baltimore, and retired there.

== Major League career ==
Melton enjoyed his best year in his rookie season of 1937, when he had a record of 20–9 with a 2.61 earned run average (ERA) and topped the National League (NL) with seven saves, helping the Giants win the NL pennant before losing to the New York Yankees in the 1937 World Series. Melton also was named to the National League All-Star team in 1942.

For his career, Melton posted an 86–80 record with a 3.42 ERA in 272 pitching appearances (179 starts), and striking out 660 batters while walking 431 in 1,453 2/3 innings of work. In World Series play, he went 0–2 with a 4.91 ERA in three games (two starts), including seven strikeouts and six walks in 11 innings.

Melton died on July 28, 1986, in Baltimore, Maryland, at the age of 74.

== Fact ==
On September 15, 1938, Melton was on the mound the first time that two brothers hit back-to-back home runs in major league history. The batters were Lloyd Waner and Paul Waner of the Pittsburgh Pirates. (The second time was not until April 23, 2013, when B. J. Upton and Justin Upton of the Atlanta Braves homered against Colorado Rockies' Jon Garland.)

== See also ==
- List of Major League Baseball annual saves leaders
