= Al Cuccinello =

American baseball player (1914-2004)

- Second baseman
- Born: August 26, 1914; New York City, U.S.
- Died: March 29, 2004 (aged 89); Malverne, New York, U.S.
- Batted: Right Threw: Right

MLB debut
- May 17, 1935, for the New York Giants

Last MLB appearance
- June 29, 1935, for the New York Giants

MLB statistics
- Batting average: .248
- Home runs: 4
- Runs batted in: 20
- Stats at Baseball Reference

Teams
- New York Giants (1935)

Alfred Edward Cuccinello (August 26, 1914 – March 29, 2004) was an American second baseman in Major League Baseball who played briefly for the New York Giants during the 1935 season. Listed at 5 feet 10 inches (1.78 m) tall and 165 pounds (75 kg), Cuccinello batted and threw right-handed. He was the younger brother of Tony Cuccinello and uncle of Sam Mele.

A native of Long Island City in the Queens borough of New York City, New York, Cuccinello began his professional career with the Nashville Volunteers, playing for them in 1934 and 1935. He had a batting average of .320 for the Volunteers in 1934 through 129 games and .315 in 1935. Cuccinello was then promoted partway through 1935 appeared in 54 games for the New York Giants. On May 30 of that year, he hit a home run in his first game at the Polo Grounds, and on July 5, he and his brother Tony, of the Brooklyn Dodgers, each hit home runs in the same game, the first time opposing brothers accomplished such a feat. In his one season in the major leagues, Cuccinello posted a .248 average (41–for–165) with four home runs and 20 RBI, including 27 runs, seven doubles and one triple.

After the 1935 season, Cuccinello returned to the minor leagues. He spent 1936 with the Columbus Red Birds, then spent part of 1936 and all of 1937 with the Rochester Red Wings. He finished his playing career in 1938 with the Houston Buffaloes.

Following his playing career, Cuccinello spent some time working as a municipal worker in New York City. He then returned to baseball as a scout for the New York Yankees for 21 years. He also served as a member of the United States Coast Guard during World War II. He died in Malverne, New York at the age of 89 on March 29, 2004.
