= George Hausmann =

American baseball player (1916-2004)

- Second baseman
- Born: February 11, 1916; St. Louis, Missouri, U.S.
- Died: June 16, 2004 (aged 88); Boerne, Texas, U.S.
- Batted: Right Threw: Right

MLB debut
- April 18, 1944, for the New York Giants

Last MLB appearance
- August 11, 1949, for the New York Giants

MLB statistics
- Batting average: .268
- Home runs: 3
- Runs batted in: 78
- Stats at Baseball Reference

Teams
- New York Giants (1944–1945, 1949)

George John Hausmann (February 11, 1916 – June 16, 2004) was an American second baseman in Major League Baseball. He played for the New York Giants.
