= Ken Brondell =

American baseball player (1921-2004)

- Pitcher
- Born: October 17, 1921; Bradshaw, Nebraska
- Died: October 3, 2004 (aged 82); Van Nuys, California
- Batted: Right Threw: Right

MLB debut
- May 3, 1944, for the New York Giants

Last MLB appearance
- October 1, 1944, for the New York Giants

MLB statistics
- Win–loss record: 0–1
- Earned run average: 8.38
- Strikeouts: 1
- Stats at Baseball Reference

Teams
- New York Giants (1944)

Kenneth Leroy Brondell (October 17, 1921 – October 3, 2004) was a Major League Baseball pitcher who had seven appearances for the New York Giants, all in 1944. After his short MLB career, Brondell joined the Los Angeles Police Department (LAPD) in 1945. He retired in 1975 after 30 years at the rank of Detective.

Brondell's only decision came in his final game, on October 1, 1944, when he gave up 10 runs to the St. Louis Cardinals. Nick Strincevich is the only batter struck out by Brondell.
