= Tony Cuccinello =

American baseball player (1907–1995)

- Second baseman / Third baseman
- Born: November 8, 1907; Long Island City, New York, U.S.
- Died: September 21, 1995 (aged 87); Tampa, Florida, U.S.
- Batted: Right Threw: Right

MLB debut
- April 15, 1930, for the Cincinnati Reds

Last MLB appearance
- September 25, 1945, for the Chicago White Sox

MLB statistics
- Batting average: .280
- Home runs: 94
- Runs batted in: 884
- Stats at Baseball Reference

Teams
- Cincinnati Reds (1930–1931); Brooklyn Dodgers (1932–1935); Boston Bees (1936–1940); New York Giants (1940); Boston Braves (1942–1943); Chicago White Sox (1944–1945)

Career highlights and awards
- 3× All-Star (1933, 1938, 1945); World Series champion (1968)

Anthony Francis Cuccinello (November 8, 1907 – September 21, 1995) was an American professional baseball second baseman and third baseman, then a longtime coach. He played in Major League Baseball (MLB) for the Cincinnati Reds, Brooklyn Dodgers, Boston Bees / Braves, New York Giants and Chicago White Sox between 1930 and 1945. He was the older brother and uncle, respectively, of former major league players Al Cuccinello and Sam Mele. His surname was pronounced "coo-chi-NELL-oh".

A native of Long Island City, New York, Cuccinello threw and batted right-handed; he was listed as 5 feet 7 inches (1.70 m) tall, with a playing weight of 160 pounds (73 kg). As a major leaguer, he led National League second basemen in assists and double plays three times and hit .300 or better five times, with a career high .315 in 1931. He was selected for MLB's first All-Star Game, played on July 6, 1933 at Comiskey Park, batting as a pinch-hitter for Carl Hubbell in the ninth inning. He also was selected for the 1938 All-Star Game.

On August 13, 1931, as a member of the Reds, he had six hits in six at bats, scoring four runs and recording five RBI in a 17–3 rout of the Braves.

During the 1945 season, the 37-year-old Cuccinello hit .308 for the White Sox, and just missed winning the American League batting title, one point behind Snuffy Stirnweiss' .309. Nevertheless, with the World War II manpower shortage ending and hundreds of big league players returning to the game from military service, he was released during the offseason.

In his 15-season career, Cuccinello was a .280 hitter with 94 home runs and 884 RBI in 1,704 games. His 1,729 career hits also included 334 doubles and 46 triples.

Cuccinello spent 1941 as the player-manager of the Jersey City Giants of the top-level International League. After being out of baseball in 1946, Cuccinello managed the 1947 Tampa Smokers (named after the city's large cigar business) of the Florida International League, then he spent 1948 as a coach for the Indianapolis Indians of the Triple-A American Association. He returned to the major leagues to coach with the Reds (1949–51), Cleveland Indians (1952–56), White Sox (1957–66; 1969) and Detroit Tigers (1967–68). He was the third-base coach under former teammate Al López in Cleveland and Chicago and was a member of Lopez' 1954 and 1959 American League championship teams. As a coach with Mayo Smith's Tigers, Cuccinello earned a ring with the 1968 World Series champions.

Cuccinello died in Tampa, Florida, at the age of 87.

== See also ==
- List of Major League Baseball single-game hits leaders
