= Frank Seward =

American baseball player (1921-2004)

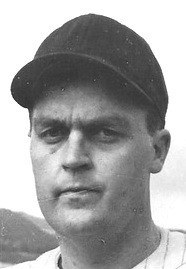
- Seward, circa 1947
- Pitcher
- Born: April 7, 1921; Pennsauken Township, New Jersey, US
- Died: April 12, 2004 (aged 83); Elmira, New York, US
- Batted: Right Threw: Right

MLB debut
- September 28, 1943, for the New York Giants

Last MLB appearance
- September 22, 1944, for the New York Giants

MLB statistics
- Win–loss record: 3–3
- Earned run average: 5.15
- Strikeouts: 18
- Stats at Baseball Reference

Teams
- New York Giants (1943–1944)

Frank Martin Seward (April 7, 1921 – April 12, 2004) was an American pitcher in Major League Baseball. He played for the New York Giants.

Raised in Pennsauken Township, New Jersey, Seward played prep baseball at Merchantville High School, graduating in 1939, before enrolling at Duke University and pitching for the Blue Devils baseball team.
