= 1942 in baseball =

The following are the baseball events of the year 1942 throughout the world.

== Champions ==
=== Major League Baseball ===
- World Series: St. Louis Cardinals over New York Yankees (4–1)
- All-Star Game, July 6 at Polo Grounds: American League, 3–1

=== Other champions ===
- Amateur World Series: Cuba
- Negro World Series: Kansas City Monarchs over Homestead Grays (4–0)
- Negro League Baseball All-Star Game: East, 5–2
- Minor leagues
  - Northern League: Winnipeg Maroons

== Awards and honors ==
- Baseball Hall of Fame
  - Rogers Hornsby
- Most Valuable Player
  - Joe Gordon (AL) – New York Yankees (2B)
  - Mort Cooper (NL) – St. Louis Cardinals (P)
- The Sporting News Player of the Year Award
  - Ted Williams – Boston Red Sox (LF)
- The Sporting News Most Valuable Player Award
  - Joe Gordon (AL) – New York Yankees (2B)
  - Mort Cooper (NL) – St. Louis Cardinals (P)
- The Sporting News Manager of the Year Award
  - Billy Southworth – St. Louis Cardinals

== Statistical leaders ==
Any team shown in small text indicates a previous team a player was on during the season.

	American League		National League		Negro American League		Negro National League	
Stat	Player	Total	Player	Total	Player	Total	Player	Total
AVG	Ted Williams^{1} (BOS)	.356	Ernie Lombardi (BSN)	.330	Ted Strong^{2} (KCM)	.364	Lennie Pearson^{3} (NE/HOM)	.347
HR	Ted Williams^{1} (BOS)	36	Mel Ott (NYG)	30	Ted Strong^{2} (KCM)	6	Lennie Pearson^{3} (NE/HOM)	11
RBI	Ted Williams^{1} (BOS)	137	Johnny Mize (NYG)	110	Ted Strong^{2} (KCM)	32	Lennie Pearson^{3} (NE/HOM)	56
W	Tex Hughson (BOS)	22	Mort Cooper (STL)	22	Diamond Pipkins (BBB)	7	Ray Brown (HOM); Bill Byrd (BEG)	10
ERA	Ted Lyons (CWS)	2.10	Mort Cooper (STL)	1.78	Smoky Owens (CLB)	1.83	Roy Partlow (HOM)	1.69
K	Tex Hughson (BOS); Bobo Newsom (WSH)	113	Johnny Vander Meer (CIN)	186	Satchel Paige (KCM)	56	Leon Day (NE/HOM)	86

^{1} American League Triple Crown batting winner
^{2} Negro American League Triple Crown batting winner
^{3} Negro American League Triple Crown batting winner

== Major league baseball final standings ==
=== American League final standings ===
American League
Team	W	L	Pct.	GB	Home	Road
New York Yankees	103	51	.669	—	58‍–‍19	45‍–‍32
Boston Red Sox	93	59	.612	9	53‍–‍24	40‍–‍35
St. Louis Browns	82	69	.543	19½	40‍–‍37	42‍–‍32
Cleveland Indians	75	79	.487	28	39‍–‍39	36‍–‍40
Detroit Tigers	73	81	.474	30	43‍–‍34	30‍–‍47
Chicago White Sox	66	82	.446	34	35‍–‍35	31‍–‍47
Washington Senators	62	89	.411	39½	35‍–‍42	27‍–‍47
Philadelphia Athletics	55	99	.357	48	25‍–‍51	30‍–‍48

Locations of teams for the 1942–1953 American League seasons
American League

=== National League final standings ===
National League
Team	W	L	Pct.	GB	Home	Road
St. Louis Cardinals	106	48	.688	—	60‍–‍17	46‍–‍31
Brooklyn Dodgers	104	50	.675	2	57‍–‍22	47‍–‍28
New York Giants	85	67	.559	20	47‍–‍31	38‍–‍36
Cincinnati Reds	76	76	.500	29	38‍–‍39	38‍–‍37
Pittsburgh Pirates	66	81	.449	36½	41‍–‍34	25‍–‍47
Chicago Cubs	68	86	.442	38	36‍–‍41	32‍–‍45
Boston Braves	59	89	.399	44	33‍–‍36	26‍–‍53
Philadelphia Phils	42	109	.278	62½	23‍–‍51	19‍–‍58

Locations of teams for the 1942 National League season
National League

== Negro league baseball final standings ==
All Negro leagues standings below are per MLB and Seamheads.

=== Negro American League final standings ===
vs. Negro American League						vs. Major Black teams			
Negro American League	W	L	T	Pct.	GB	W	L	T	Pct.
Kansas City Monarchs	36	14	0	.720	—	59	27	0	.686
Cincinnati–Cleveland Buckeyes	42	22	1	.654	1	57	55	2	.509
Memphis Red Sox	34	27	1	.556	7½	47	37	2	.558
Birmingham Black Barons	25	23	0	.521	10	48	45	1	.516
Jacksonville Red Caps†	7	30	0	.189	22½	8	40	1	.173
Chicago American Giants	8	36	0	.182	25	19	55	0	.257

†Jacksonville Red Caps withdrew in July.

Locations of teams for the 1942 Negro American League season
Negro American League
Note:The Buckeyes played home games in Cincinnati, Cleveland, and less-so at Meadville

=== Negro National League final standings ===
vs. Negro National League						vs. Major Black teams			
Negro National League	W	L	T	Pct.	GB	W	L	T	Pct.
Homestead Grays	23	10	1	.691	—	86	29	3	.742
Baltimore Elite Giants	24	14	0	.674	1½	45	36	1	.555
Newark Eagles	16	18	1	.471	7½	40	40	4	.500
Philadelphia Stars	19	22	0	.463	8	38	38	2	.500
New York Cubans	8	14	0	.364	9½	21	47	1	.312
New York Black Yankees	8	20	0	.286	12½	19	31	2	.385

Locations of teams for the 1942 Negro National League season
Negro National League
Note: Homestead Grays play their games equally between Washington, D.C. and Pittsburgh.

=== Independent teams final standings ===
The Negro American League All Star team & Cincinnati Clowns played against the two leagues.

vs. All Teams
Independent Clubs	W	L	T	Pct.	GB
NAL All Stars	2	2	0	.500	—
Cincinnati Clowns	9	16	1	.365	3½

== Events ==
=== January ===
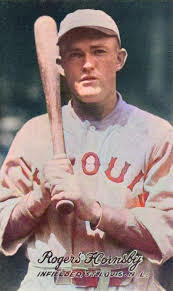
Rogers Hornsby

- January 6 – Fireballer Bob Feller, named today by the Baseball Writers' Association of America to its 1941 all-MLB All-Star team, begins his United States Navy training as a boatswain's mate in Norfolk, Virginia. The 25-game winner enlisted four weeks ago, on December 9, two days after the Attack on Pearl Harbor plunged the United States into World War II.
- January 7
  - Today, the one-month anniversary of Pearl Harbor, sees the induction of three-time All-Star outfielder Cecil Travis of the Washington Senators into the armed services. Travis, 28, finished second in batting (.359) to Ted Williams' .406 and led the American League in hits (218) in 1941.
  - Facing the possibility of an industry shutdown, and with stars such as Feller, Travis and Hank Greenberg in military service, AL president Will Harridge asserts that his circuit hopes to carry on in 1942 to perform baseball's role as "an important recreational and morale portion of our national defense program." AL owners, he says, are prepared to meet in emergency session during this month and next, in response to any change in conditions caused by the war.
- January 14 – The Boston Red Sox release coach Moe Berg at his request, enabling Berg, a master linguist who speaks at least nine languages, to take on a diplomatic assignment from the United States Department of State in Latin America. Princeton alumnus Berg, 39, who played in all or part of 15 MLB seasons, primarily as a catcher, between 1923 and 1939, will go on to reputedly serve as an espionage agent for the U.S. during World War II.
- January 15 – President Franklin Delano Roosevelt encourages Organized Baseball to continue despite the United States' entry into World War II and hails the sport as a "recreational asset." In a letter to Commissioner Kenesaw Mountain Landis, Roosevelt writes: "I honestly feel that it would be best for the country to keep baseball going." His "green light" letter ensures that the 1942 season will go forward as planned and negates rumors of an industry shutdown in the near term.
- January 20 – Rogers Hornsby, the greatest hitter in modern National League history (.359 with 298 home runs over 19 seasons) and contemporaneously thought of as the top right-handed batsman in major-league annals, is the lone 1942 selection to the National Baseball Hall of Fame and Museum. The gruff former second baseman, 45, is named on 182 of 233 ballots cast.
- January 23 – In a letter to his team, Cincinnati Reds general manager Warren Giles, a World War I veteran, warns players against "shirking" their wartime service obligation. He writes: "We would rather finish last or not operate at all ... than have even one player who cannot justify his reasons for not being in the service."
- January 27 – For the second time in three days, the American League's second-division St. Louis Browns strengthen their roster by purchasing "surplus" talent from their National League tenant at Sportsman's Park, the pennant-contending St. Louis Cardinals. Today the Browns add second baseman Don Gutteridge, after obtaining southpaw Al "Boots" Hollingsworth on the 24th. Both men, who played for the Redbirds' Triple-A Sacramento affiliate in 1941, will be members of the Browns' 1944 AL pennant-winner.

=== February ===
- February 3 – Fulfilling President Franklin Roosevelt's expressed request for more night baseball to entertain war workers during the 1942 season, MLB owners expand the maximum number of evening dates clubs may play from seven to 14, and 21 for the Washington Senators. However, venues such as Yankee Stadium, Fenway Park, Briggs Stadium and Wrigley Field continue to lack arc lights to host such contests, and coastal cities are further limited by "dim-out" restrictions enacted for security reasons.
- February 7 – Hard-hitting catcher Ernie Lombardi, a future member of the Hall of Fame, is traded by the Cincinnati Reds to the Boston Braves in exchange for cash and/or "players to be named later." The 1938 National League Most Valuable Player and batting champion—and a five-time All-Star—Lombardi, 33, is reportedly at an impasse in contract talks with Cincinnati after an off-year in 1941.
- February 9 – Philadelphia's National League franchise shortens its official nickname from Phillies (in use since 1886) to Phils to differentiate itself from the popular cigar brand. The change lasts for this season only before the original moniker is restored.
- February 10 – Gordon Houston, 25, an outfielder/shortstop who had played with minor-league Texarkana in 1940, becomes the first Organized Baseball player to die on active duty in World War II. USAAF second lieutenant Houston, returning from an anti-submarine mission along the Pacific Coast, perishes when the Republic P-43 Lancer fighter plane he's piloting crashes at McChord Field near Tacoma, Washington.
- February 26 – The successful, three-year return to pennant contention of the 1941 NL champion Brooklyn Dodgers is reflected in its balance sheets when its chief creditor, the Brooklyn Trust Company, which manages 75% of Dodgers' stock on behalf of the estates of Charles Ebbets and Edward J. McKeever, tells a county probate court that the team has cleared all debts—over $500,000—accrued over recent years. Brooklyn led all 16 MLB teams in home attendance in 1941, drawing 1.21 million fans to Ebbets Field. The bank will sell the shares held in trust beginning in 1944.

=== March ===
- March 12 – Joe DiMaggio's ten-day holdout ends when the New York Yankees' 27-year-old superstar and reigning American League MVP agrees to a 1942 salary estimated at $42,500, a $5,000 raise from 1941's contract.
- March 18 – Former UCLA baseball letterman Jackie Robinson and Negro leagues pitcher/outfielder Nate Moreland are invited to work out with the Chicago White Sox, who hold spring training in Pasadena, California. Sox manager Jimmie Dykes praises Robinson's baserunning to Pittsburgh Courier sportswriter Herman Hill, saying, "He stole everything but my infielders' gloves." Dykes goes on record to the Courier, adding, "Personally, I would welcome Negro players on the White Sox and I believe every one of the other 15 managers would do so likewise. As for the players, they'd all get along too." However, Dykes is unable to even consider offering contracts to either, stating that it is a matter for club owners, league officials and the Commissioner of Baseball to allow it.
- March 23 – The combatants in the 1941 World Series make a deal when the victorious New York Yankees sell the contract of free-spirited outfielder Frenchy Bordagaray to the NL-champion Brooklyn Dodgers. Bordagaray, 32, returns to the team where he came to prominence as one of the "Daffiness Boys" of the mid-1930s.
- March 30 – The Detroit Tigers rid themselves of Bobo Newsom, pitching star of their 1940 American League champions, selling the right-hander's contract to the Washington Senators for the handsome price of $40,000. Newsom, 34, won 20 or more games for three straight seasons (1938–1940), but slumped to a 12–20 (4.60) mark in 1941 and was embroiled in a contract squabble with Detroit's front office.

=== April ===
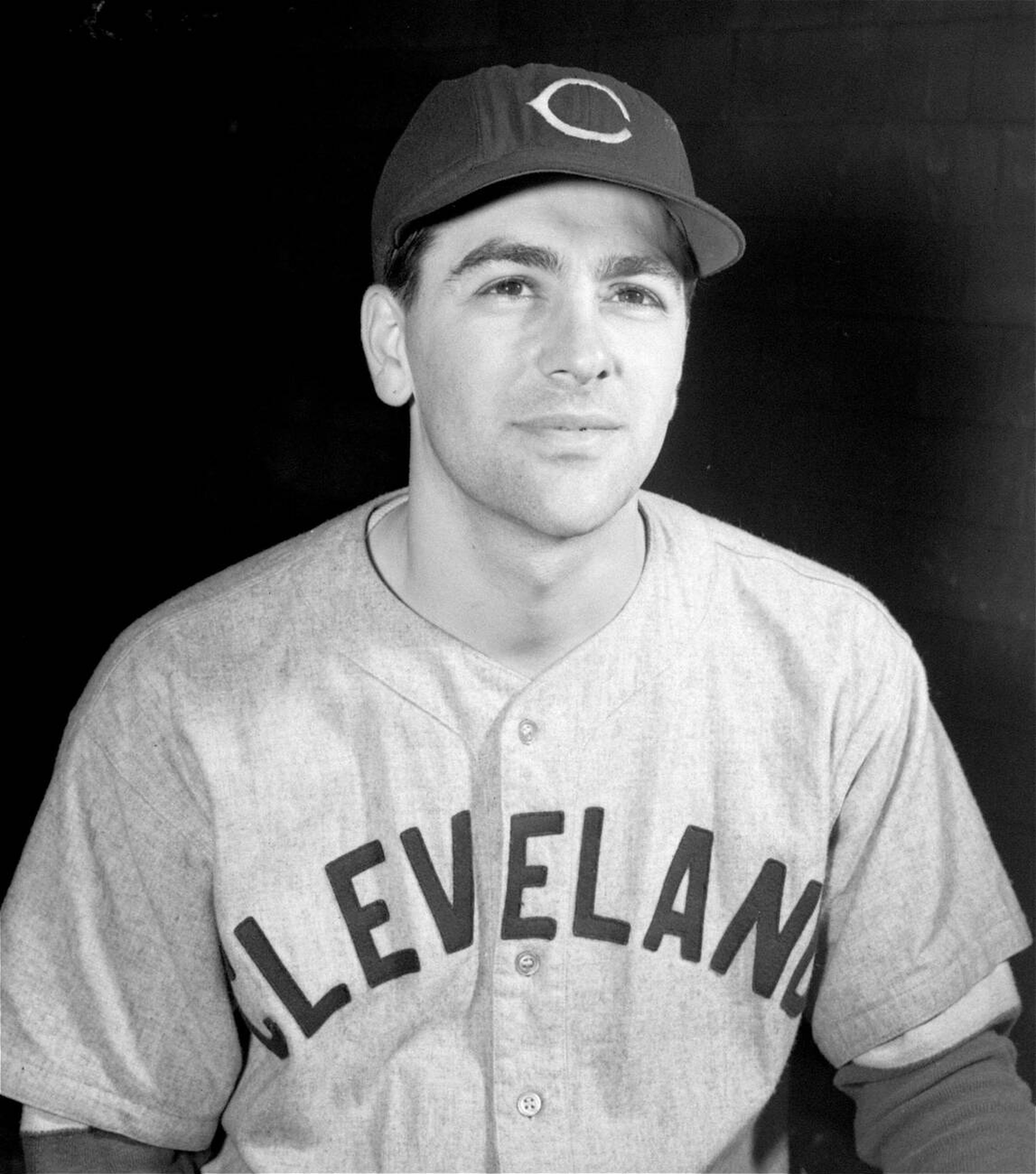
Lou Boudreau

- April 14 – A full slate of games opens the 1942 major-league season.
  - In the annual "Presidential Opener," the reigning world-champion New York Yankees defeat the host Washington Senators, 7–0, behind Red Ruffing's three-hitter; U.S. Vice President Henry Wallace throws out the first pitch.
  - At the Polo Grounds, the Brooklyn Dodgers, defending National League champs, spoil Mel Ott's debut as player–manager of the New York Giants, scoring seven runs off Carl Hubbell in the first five innings, then holding on to win, 7–5.
  - Lou Boudreau debuts as shortstop–manager of the Cleveland Indians, going two-for-three with a double and scoring a run in Cleveland's 5–2 triumph over the Detroit Tigers at Briggs Stadium. Boudreau, 24 and starting his fourth full big-league season, is the second-youngest manager in MLB history.
- April 16 – At Fenway Park, the Boston Red Sox unleash a barrage of 21 hits (including home runs from Dominic DiMaggio and Ted Williams) and crush the Philadelphia Athletics, 19–4. Connie Mack leaves reliever Les McCrabb in the game to allow 14 earned runs over four innings of work. The Bosox' 19 runs scored in today's game set the standard in MLB in 1942.
- April 29 – The Detroit Tigers sell the contract of right-hander Schoolboy Rowe, 32, mound ace of their 1934, 1935 and 1940 pennant-winners, to the Brooklyn Dodgers.

=== May ===
- May 1 – Umpire Larry Goetz ejects four members of the Pittsburgh Pirates—two players, a coach and manager Frankie Frisch—in the Bucs' 7–6 victory over the Brooklyn Dodgers.
- May 3 – The National League's contentious early season continues, when umpires boot five Dodgers in today's doubleheader against the St. Louis Cardinals at Sportsman's Park; the Cardinals sweep first-place Brooklyn, 14–10 and 4–2, to pull within 2½ games of the lead.
- May 6 – Colorful, well-traveled Bobo Newsom, now with the Washington Senators, tosses the first one-hitter of the 1942 MLB season, blanking his previous team, the Detroit Tigers, 7–0, at Griffith Stadium. Newsom walks four and the only safety he allows is Doc Cramer's third-inning triple. Eight one-hitters will be thrown this season, but there will be no no-hitters.
- May 13
  - Jim Tobin of the Boston Braves almost single-handedly beats the Chicago Cubs at Braves Field, 6–5, by pitching a five-hitter and hitting three consecutive home runs. Tobin, who hit a pinch-homer the day before, becomes the only pitcher in modern history to collect three home runs in a Major League game. His fourth at-bat results in a fly ball caught against the fence in left field. Tobin's is one of two three-homer performances by MLB hitters in 1942; the other will belong to the Cubs' Clyde McCullough on July 26.
  - The St. Louis Browns purchase the contract of Babe Dahlgren, who became part of baseball lore when he replaced Lou Gehrig at first base for the Yankees, thus ending the consecutive playing streak, from the Chicago Cubs. Less than a week later, the Browns return him to the Cubs, who then sell his contract to the Brooklyn Dodgers.
- May 22 – Ted Williams of the Boston Red Sox enlists in the United States Navy Reserve. He will be called to active duty in November after winning the American League's Triple Crown.

=== June ===
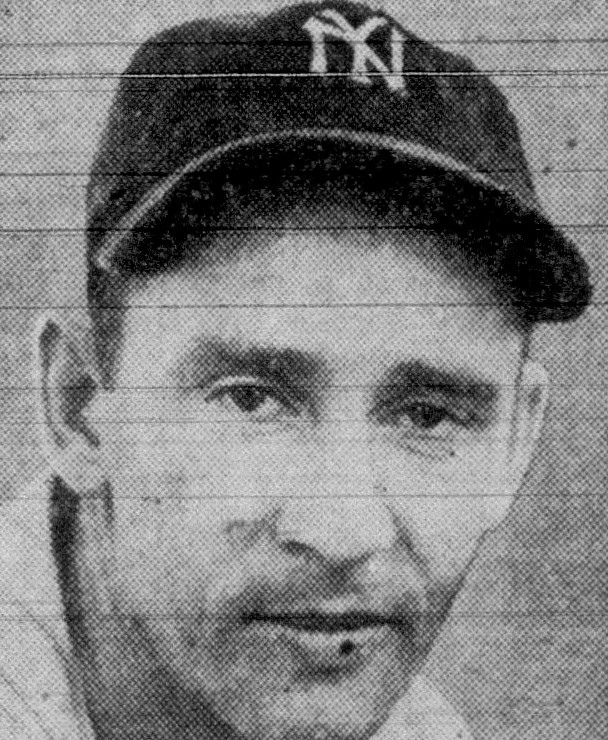
Joe Gordon

- June 1
  - Jimmie Foxx, placed on waivers by the Boston Red Sox, is claimed by the Chicago Cubs. Foxx, 34, has slugged 524 home runs to date in his 17+ seasons, second only to Babe Ruth's legendary 714 and most by any right-handed hitter in the American or National leagues.
  - The St. Louis Browns trade pitcher Bob Harris and catcher Bob Swift to the Philadelphia Athletics for catcher Frankie "Blimp" Hayes, a three-time former AL All-Star.
- June 5 – After hurling 15 scoreless innings, Canadian right-hander Dick Fowler of the Athletics surrenders a triple to Wally Judnich and a run-scoring fly-ball out to Chet Laabs in the 16th, and drops a 1–0 decision to the Browns at Shibe Park.
- June 7 – The St. Louis Browns are in the news again, trading 1941 AL All-Star outfielder Roy Cullenbine and pitcher Bill Trotter to the Washington Senators for pitcher Steve Sundra and outfielder Mike Chartak.
- June 14 – In the first game of a twin bill against the Browns in the Bronx, Joe Gordon of the New York Yankees extends his consecutive-games hitting streak to 29, longest this year in the majors, with a sixth-inning single, before going 0-for-4 in the nightcap. During the streak, which began May 13, Gordon hits six homers and raises his batting average to .396; the Yanks go 24–5. Gordon, 27, is en route to the 1942 AL Most Valuable Player Award and a berth in the Hall of Fame.
- June 19 – With his fifth-inning single off Rip Sewell, future Hall of Famer Paul Waner of the Boston Braves joins the 3,000 hit club. The blow comes against the visiting Pittsburgh Pirates, for whom "Big Poison," now 39, had played 15 years (1926–1940), 2,154 games—and amassed 2,868 of those career hits.
- June 26 – Gene Stack, a 23-year-old minor-league right-hander who, on January 7, 1941, became the first player on an MLB roster drafted into military service, dies suddenly after pitching for his U.S. Army base, Fort Custer (Michigan). Stack had won 19 games for Class D Lubbock in the Chicago White Sox organization in 1940 and was added to the ChiSox' 40-man roster after the season. His death, initially thought to have been caused by a heart attack, is attributed to pneumonia.
- June 30 – At Sportsman's Park, Mort Cooper of the St. Louis Cardinals extends his MLB-best scoreless innings pitched streak to 33 before Elbie Fletcher of the Pittsburgh Pirates hits a two-out, first-inning homer. Cooper's skein, which included three straight shutouts, had started June 12. He goes on to record a 4–2 victory today, his 11th triumph of the season, although his earned run average climbs from 1.19 to 1.24.

=== July ===
- July 6
  - Before 33,694 at the Polo Grounds, home of the New York Giants, the American League defeats the National League, 3–1, in the All–Star Game. First-inning home runs by Lou Boudreau and Rudy York are decisive. With proceeds donated to war-related charities, the game is moved from Ebbets Field to accommodate larger crowds.
  - With the All-Star break and July 4 weekend almost coinciding, the halfway mark of the 1942 MLB season appears to predict a coming rematch of the 1941 World Series. In the AL, the New York Yankees (50–26) lead the Boston Red Sox (46–30) by four. In the NL, the Brooklyn Dodgers (52–21) have built an 8½-game margin over the St. Louis Cardinals (43–29).
- July 8 – The Cardinals sell the contract of 33-year-old starting pitcher Lon Warneke to his original team, the Chicago Cubs. Warneke is a five-time NL All-Star, most recently in 1941, when he won 17 games for St. Louis.
- July 16 – The first-place New York Yankees, now 7½ games ahead in the Junior Circuit, make two inter-league waiver transactions with the Cincinnati Reds, acquiring right-hander Jim Turner and third baseman Joe Abreu for outfielder Frankie Kelleher; in a separate deal, the Yankees also pick up Cincinnati's former centerfielder, Harry Craft, for fellow outfielder Eric Tipton.
- July 19
  - At Sportsman's Park, "Pistol Pete" Reiser, the Brooklyn Dodgers' brilliant, daredevil, 23-year-old centerfielder, fractures his skull and suffers a concussion when, flagging down a long drive hit by the Cardinals' Enos Slaughter in the 11th inning of a six-all tie, he smashes head-first into the concrete outfield wall. Upon impact, Reiser collapses to the ground, the ball drops from his glove to remain in play, and Slaughter rounds the bases for an inside the park home run, delivering a hard-won doubleheader sweep for his Redbirds against their arch-foes. Reiser is hospitalized for four days "to rest," but returns to the Brooklyn lineup July 25. Plagued by double-vision and headaches, he hits only .244 in the season's final two months, his batting average drops from .350 to .310, and the Dodgers' pennant drive stalls.
  - Boston Red Sox pitcher Mike Ryba catches both games of a doubleheader against the Cleveland Indians at Fenway Park. Known as the "one-man team" during his minor-league career because of his versatility, Ryba caught as many as 406 games in the minors.

=== August ===
- August 4 – Wartime "dim-out" restrictions dictate an abrupt halt to a 1–1 deadlock between the Brooklyn Dodgers and New York Giants at the Polo Grounds in the visitors' half of the tenth frame—and wipe out an inside-the-park grand-slam homer just struck by the Dodgers' Pee Wee Reese. The score reverts to the bottom of the ninth inning and the game is ruled a tie. When the St. Louis Cardinals drop a 4–3 contest to the Cincinnati Reds at Crosley Field, the Dodgers, now 73–30–1 and seemingly breezing to their second straight pennant, increase their National League lead to ten full games over the 62–39–1 Cardinals; it's the largest cushion Brooklyn will enjoy in 1942.
- August 8 – At Forbes Field, the Cardinals and host Pittsburgh Pirates play to a 16-inning, 5–5 tie before the rain-delayed game is called on account of darkness. St. Louis ace Mort Cooper turns in a rare poor performance, but the Redbird bullpen fires 132/3 scoreless innings. Individual statistics will count, but the teams will start from scratch on Monday, August 10.
- August 9 – The Chicago Cubs and Cincinnati Reds struggle for 18 innings before the visiting Cubs emerge victorious, 10–8, in the first game of a doubleheader at Crosley Field. The teams combine for 39 hits (with no homers for either side) in the majors' longest game, by innings played, of 1942. Dom Dallessandro's double off Elmer Riddle provides the winning run.
- August 20 – The Pittsburgh Pirates reveal that owner William Benswanger has asked Wendell Smith of the Pittsburgh Courier, one of the leading proponents within the Black press advocating the dismantling of the baseball color line, to identify players from the Negro leagues as candidates to try out over the off-season to become members of the all-white Pirates in 1943. Smith selects four: pitcher Leon Day, catcher Josh Gibson, shortstop Willie Wells and outfielder Sam Bankhead. Nothing comes of the request; the tryouts never occur. Day, Gibson and Wells all are eventually enshrined in Cooperstown as members of the Baseball Hall of Fame.
- August 23 – In a benefit appearance before 69,136 fans, Babe Ruth, 47, dons a New York Yankees' uniform for the first time in seven years for a hitting exhibition against Walter Johnson, now 54, at Yankee Stadium. On Johnson's fifth pitch, Ruth hits a drive into the lower right field stands, and the crowd thunders its approval. On the final pitch, Ruth smashes a towering, upper-deck shot that's just foul; he circles the bases anyway, doffing his cap and saluting the roaring crowd with every step. Ruth and Johnson then leave the field together to a thunderous ovation. Their exhibition raises $80,000 for the Army-Navy relief fund.
- August 31
  - With a month to go in the regular season, a pennant race emerges in the National League. The red-hot, second-place St. Louis Cardinals, who went 25–8 in August, shave five full games off the Brooklyn Dodgers' formerly comfortable, 8½-length cushion. The Redbirds' record now stands at 85–44 with 25 games to play.
  - The 88–40 Dodgers, in a bid to strengthen their pitching staff, purchase itinerant right-hander Bobo Newsom, a former three-time 20-game winner, from the Washington Senators.
  - The 86–44 New York Yankees, eight games ahead of the second-place Boston Red Sox in the American League, acquire outfielder Roy Cullenbine on waivers, also from Washington.

=== September ===
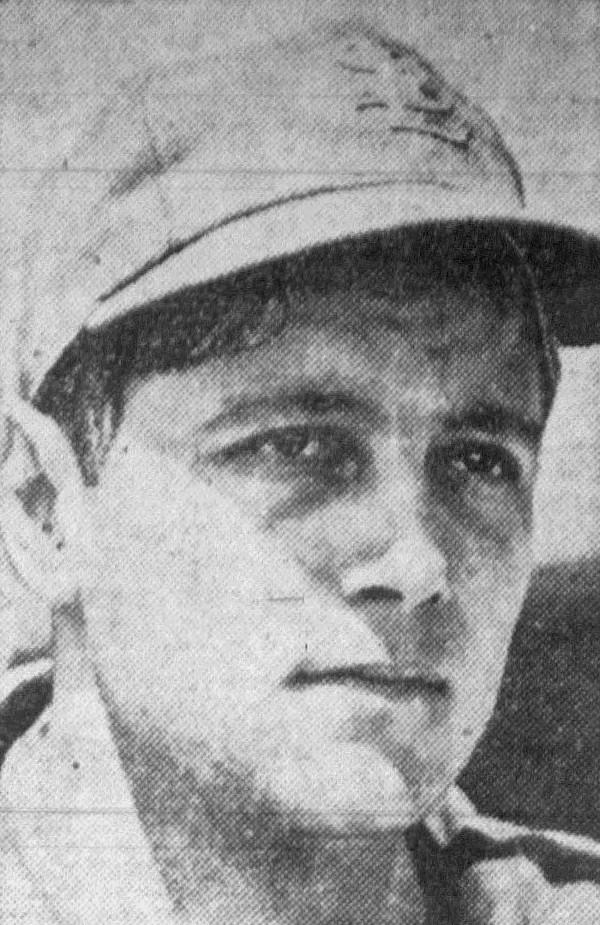
Johnny Beazley

- September 1 – Urged on by the city's Black newspaper, the Call and Post, the Cleveland Indians publicly invite three African-American players—pitcher Gene Bremer, third baseman Parnell Woods and outfielder Sam Jethroe—to try out for their 1943 squad. All three are members of the Cleveland Buckeyes of the Negro American League. The tryout, however, never materializes.
- September 7 – Tragedy strikes the Cleveland Buckeyes when an automobile carrying ace pitcher Bremer, hurler/outfielder Smoky Owens, catcher Ulysses "Joe" Brown, at least two other players, and a club official is struck by a tractor-trailer on U.S. Route 20 just west of Geneva, Ohio. Owens and Brown are killed, and Bremer sustains a fractured skull and concussion. (See Deaths below.) The Buckeyes are car-pooling as they travel between Akron and Buffalo because their team bus is in a garage for repairs. The grief-stricken survivors decide to finish out their season.
- September 11 – Chicago Cubs catcher Paul Gillespie homers in his first major league at bat. In September 1945, he'll homer in his final MLB regular-season at bat and become the first player in MLB history to do both. Gillespie, however, will prolong his career in the 1945 World Series, where he will go 0-for-6.
- September 12
  - The St. Louis Cardinals climb into a first-place tie with the Brooklyn Dodgers in the National League when Max Lanier defeats Brooklyn for the fifth time in 1942, 2–1, at Ebbets Field. Whitey Kurowski's second-inning, two-run homer gives Lanier the run support he needs. Both clubs are 94–46, with the scorching Cardinals erasing the Dodgers' ten-game lead by going 32–7 since August 4. The Cardinals also capture the season series, 13 games to nine.
  - When the Cardinals arrive by train in Philadelphia later today for a four-game series against the last-place Phils, 19-game-winning righty Johnny Beazley suffers minor lacerations to his pitching hand when he's attacked by a knife-wielding assailant on the station platform. Beazley will take his regular turn in the rotation tomorrow despite the injury, dropping a 2–1 decision to the Phils at Shibe Park.
- September 13 – In the second game of a doubleheader at Braves Field, Lennie Merullo commits four errors in the second inning of the Chicago Cubs' 12–8 victory over the Boston Braves. Merullo had just been informed that his wife had just delivered their first child, son Len Jr. The next day, Chicago newspapers suggest that the newborn be nicknamed "Boots" in honor of the occasion.
- September 14
  - The New York Yankees, now 98–47, clinch their second consecutive American League pennant, their sixth in the past seven seasons, and their 13th since 1921 with an 8–3 victory in Cleveland. The Bombers lead the second-place Boston Red Sox by ten games with nine left to play.
  - Vice president Branch Rickey strongly signals his imminent departure from the St. Louis Cardinals when he evades reporters' questions about his immediate future with the team whose front office he has overseen since May 1925. Rickey's lucrative contract expires at the end of the season, and owner Sam Breadon wants to cut his salary. Rickey's tenure—marked by his creation of baseball's most successful farm system—has seen the Cardinals become an NL dynasty that's currently on the verge of winning its sixth pennant since 1926.
- September 16 – The Brooklyn Dodgers, who now lag behind the Cardinals by two full games, face off-field issues, too, when four of their fans appear before a magistrate in Brooklyn–Queens Night Court to answer charges that they assaulted Ebbets Field ushers in the stands an hour before today's game against the Pittsburgh Pirates. The defense attorney asks the judge to subpoena Brooklyn manager Leo Durocher and players Mickey Owen and Dixie Walker who, he claims, climbed into the stands and attacked the fans on behalf of the beleaguered ushers. The case is continued until October 5—after the projected completion of the 1942 World Series.
- September 23 – Larry MacPhail, who as general manager (since 1938) and club president (since 1939) of the Dodgers has spearheaded the team's rejuvenation on the field and at the turnstiles, stuns Brooklyn by quitting both positions to return to active duty in the United States Army. The "Roaring Redhead" had signed a five-year contract extension earlier in 1942, a reflection of his manifold accomplishments as the Dodgers' chief executive: three first-division finishes and one NL pennant between 1939 and 1941. His current team has won 100 of its first 150 games, but trails the first-place Cardinals by 2½ games; nevertheless, it's poised to lead all 16 MLB teams in home attendance for the third time in four years. MacPhail, now 52, had served as an artillery captain during World War I; on October 2, he will resume his Army career as a lieutenant colonel.
- September 26 – Bucky Harris steps down from his second term as manager of the Washington Senators after a 62–89, seventh-place finish. The future Hall of Famer began his career as the 27-year-old "Boy Manager" and second baseman of the 1924 world-champion Senators. His latest stint with Washington began in 1935 but has produced only one winning season. Coach and former stalwart third baseman Ossie Bluege will be named to succeed Harris on October 10.
- September 27
  - The St. Louis Cardinals clinch the NL pennant on the last day of the regular season, defeating the Chicago Cubs, 9–2, in the first game of a doubleheader at Sportsman's Park. The Cardinals also win Game 2 of the twin bill to finish with a record of 106–48, earning the most victories by any NL team since Pittsburgh's 110 wins in 1909. The Redbirds' pennant is their sixth overall, and first since 1934.
  - Meanwhile, the second-place Brooklyn Dodgers win their season finale, 4–3, against Philadelphia to finish 104–50—the first MLB pennant runner-up to win that many games since the 1909 Cubs.
  - Ted Williams, 24-year-old Boston Red Sox superstar, wins the hitting "Triple Crown", topping the AL in batting (.356), home runs (36) and runs batted in (137), as well as runs scored (141), bases on balls received (145), on-base percentage (.499), slugging percentage (.648), OPS (1.147) and bWAR (10.5). He's MLB's first hitting Triple-Crown winner since Joe Medwick of the 1937 Cardinals.
- September 29
  - The Kansas City Monarchs defeat the Washington-Homestead Grays 9–5 at Shibe Park in Philadelphia and sweep the 1942 Negro World Series four games to none. Satchel Paige pitches 51/3 hitless innings in relief to shut down the Grays and clinch the title.
  - Former New York Yankees outfielder Ben Chapman, who spent 1942 as the player–manager of the Richmond Colts of the Class B Piedmont League, is suspended for the entire 1943 season to come for attacking an umpire and punching him in the face during a heated argument in a September 16 playoff game.

=== October ===
- October 5 – After dropping the first game of the World Series to the New York Yankees at Sportsman's Park on September 30, the St. Louis Cardinals win their fourth straight contest, 4–2, and capture the fourth world title in their history. Johnny Beazley, who whipped the Yanks in Game 2 to start the Redbirds' championship streak, racks up another complete-game victory; Whitey Kurowski's, two-run, ninth-inning homer provides the winning margin. The Bombers are swept in all three games played at Yankee Stadium, and drop their first Fall Classic since 1926—when they also fell to the Cardinals; they had won eight consecutive Series appearances in the interim.
  - The Cardinals' victory caps one of the hottest stretch-drive streaks in baseball annals; they've gone 48–10–1 since August 4, overcoming a ten-game deficit in the National League standings, and did not lose two in a row after August 2.
- October 9 – A report from the National Association of Professional Baseball Leagues, governing body of the minor leagues, reveals severe challenges caused by World War II. Ten leagues, mostly in the lower classifications, shut down prior to the 1942 campaign, and five more halted play during the middle of the season. Minor-league czar William G. Bramham says the minors will continue to operate in 1943, but warns that player shortages and travel restrictions will be crucial issues.
- October 27
  - Mort Cooper, star right-hander of the St. Louis Cardinals, is elected 1942's NL Most Valuable Player, receiving 13 of 24 first-place votes (263 points); he surpasses teammate Enos Slaughter (six votes, 200 points) and Mel Ott (four, 190 points). Cooper, 29, led all NL hurlers in victories (22), earned run average (1.78), shutouts (ten), and bWAR (8.2).
  - The suggestion, first reported in the New York Herald–Tribune, that the eight-team National and American leagues be realigned into regional Eastern and Western circuits for the duration of World War II to save on fuel and travel expenses is derided as "silly" by MLB owners and executives.

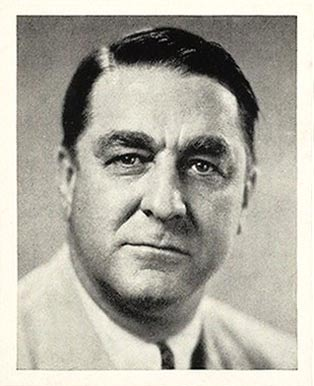
Branch Rickey

- October 29
  - The Brooklyn Dodgers sign Branch Rickey to a five-year contract as club president and general manager, replacing Larry MacPhail, now serving in the United States Army. Rickey, 60, had been business manager and vice-president of the St. Louis Cardinals since May 1925; St. Louis owner Sam Breadon had allowed Brooklyn's board of directors to speak with Rickey about their executive vacancy earlier this month. As the inventor of the modern farm system, Rickey's scouting and player development acumen has enabled the cost-conscious Cardinals to capture six NL pennants and four World Series titles during his 17 full seasons as head of their front office. At Rickey's introductory press conference, he notes that the Dodgers, who won 104 games this past season but lagged behind Rickey's world-champion Redbirds, need to develop younger players to remain competitive. The 1942 Dodgers were the second-oldest team in the NL; Rickey's Cardinals, the second-youngest.
  - Meanwhile, Breadon says he will divide Rickey's old responsibilities among multiple men within the Cardinals' organization, taking on a more involved role himself as club president and including his nephew, William Walsingham Jr., chief scout Joe Mathes, and ex-pitcher and longtime farm system official Eddie Dyer on his front-office team.

=== November ===
- November 3 – New York Yankees second baseman Joe Gordon edges Triple-Crown-winner Ted Williams in balloting for the 1942 American League Most Valuable Player Award. Gordon wins on the strength of 12 first-place votes and 270 points to Williams' nine and 249; other first-place votes go to Williams' Boston Red Sox teammate Johnny Pesky (two) and St. Louis Browns' shortstop Vern Stephens (one). Gordon finished fourth in the AL in both batting (.322) and runs batted in (103) for his pennant-winning Bombers, but the vote is seen as a deliberate snub of Williams, known to be churlish with baseball writers.
- November 14 – The Chicago Cubs purchase the contract of two-time former NL All-Star outfielder Ival Goodman, 34, from the Cincinnati Reds.
- November 24 – The St. Louis Cardinals select right-hander Gerry Staley from Boise of the Class C Pioneer League in the minor league draft. In 1947, Staley will begin a 15-season MLB career during which he makes four All-Star teams and wins 134 games, including 89 as a Cardinal.
- November 25 – The Baltimore Sun reports that a group of local businessmen has organized to buy the Philadelphia Phils from destitute owner Gerald Nugent and move them to the Maryland metropolis; the group plans to meet with mayor Howard W. Jackson in the coming days. The National League is brokering a sale of the struggling franchise, although league chief Ford Frick opposes its relocation. Baltimore has been without top-level baseball since the Federal League disbanded in 1915.
- November 28 – The Detroit Tigers change managers, naming Steve O'Neill to succeed Del Baker. O'Neill, 51, is known primarily as the former workhorse catcher of the Cleveland Indians between 1911 and 1923, and managed Cleveland to a 199–168 record between 1935 and 1937. Baker, 50, a former Tiger catcher and coach, has been at the Detroit helm since August 7, 1938, and led the 1940 edition to the AL pennant.

=== December ===
- December 1 – At the winter meetings in Chicago, player shortages and potential travel restrictions are the order of the day. The St. Louis Cardinals, who operate baseball's largest farm system, report that 67 varsity and minor-league players have joined the military in the eight weeks since the conclusion of the 1942 season. At the request of the federal Office of Defense Transportation (ODT), owners reduce 1943's regular-season travel by 25% by restricting road trips from four to three series for each team. The ODT's suggestion that spring training be moved from the warm-weather South and Southwest to locations closer to the 16 MLB clubs is initially resisted, however.
- December 3 – Ten members of the Congress of Industrial Organizations, a U.S. labor union confederation, are rebuffed in their attempt at the winter meetings to confer with Commissioner Kenesaw Mountain Landis to urge the abolition of the baseball color line. Landis issues a statement claiming that no rule prohibits teams from hiring Black athletes; later, Chicago Cubs owner Philip K. Wrigley admits that a "gentleman's agreement" among owners enforces racial segregation among the playing ranks.
- December 4
  - The winter conclave ends with major league teams "reasonably assured" of a continued green-light policy, enabling them to continue to operate during wartime in 1943, provided government directives are heeded and frills, such as spring training, are curtailed.
  - The Cincinnati Reds trade pitcher Nate Andrews, shortstop Eddie Joost and $25,000 to the Boston Braves to reacquire shortstop Eddie Miller, a three-time National League All-Star.
- December 12 – Branch Rickey's first official trade as front-office boss of the Brooklyn Dodgers sees him obtain pitcher Rube Melton, 25, from the Philadelphia Phils for fellow right-hander Johnny Allen, 38, and $30,000. Melton went 9–20 (3.70) in 42 games and 2091/3 innings pitched for the cellar-dwelling Phils last season.
- December 17 – Well-traveled Roy Cullenbine's tenure as the New York Yankees' starting right-fielder ends after 28 regular-season and five World Series games when he's dealt to the Cleveland Indians with catcher Buddy Rosar for infielder Oscar Grimes and outfielder Roy "Stormy" Weatherly. The switch-hitting Cullenbine, 29, batted .364 with 28 hits (and an OPS of 1.017) for the Yanks over 1942's stretch drive after they acquired him from the Washington Senators on August 31.

== Movies ==
- The Pride of the Yankees

== Births ==
=== January ===
- January 1 – Bill Bethea
- January 3 – Epy Guerrero
- January 5 – Wally Wolf
- January 7 – Jim Lefebvre
- January 11 – Danny Napoleon
- January 14
  - Dave Campbell
  - Billy Parker
- January 18 – Dick Estelle
- January 25 – Ernie Fazio

=== February ===
- February 4 – Joe Sparma
- February 8
  - Fritz Peterson
  - Costen Shockley
- February 9 – Hal Gilson
- February 12
  - Steve Bailey
  - Pat Dobson
- February 15 – Bill Henry
- February 16 – Tim Cullen
- February 21 – Fred Newman

=== March ===
- March 3
  - Don Dennis
  - Bob Garibaldi
- March 8
  - Dick Allen
  - George Gerberman
- March 9 – Bert Campaneris
- March 10 – Tom Hilgendorf
- March 12 – Jim Wynn
- March 13 – Marv Staehle
- March 14 – Bob Raudman
- March 21 – Len Church
- March 23 – Danny Coombs
- March 24 – Jesús Alou
- March 26 – Mel Queen
- March 30 – Conrad Cardinal

=== April ===
- April 1 – Jake Jaeckel
- April 4
  - Tom Fisher
  - Jim Fregosi
  - Ron Locke
- April 5 – Peter Magowan
- April 6 – John Wojcik
- April 7 – Tom Phoebus
- April 8 – José Herrera
- April 12
  - Dale Roberts
  - Tommie Sisk
- April 13 – Ike Brown
- April 16 – Jim Lonborg
- April 18
  - Steve Blass
  - Chuck Taylor
- April 19 – Aaron Pointer

=== May ===
- May 7 – John Flavin
- May 9 – Jerry Buchek
- May 12 – Ted Kubiak
- May 13 – Billy MacLeod
- May 14 – Tony Pérez
- May 26 – Chuck Hartenstein
- May 28 – Buddy Booker
- May 30 – John Felske

=== June ===
- June 1:
  - Randy Hundley
  - Ken McMullen
- June 3 – Duane Josephson
- June 6 – Bill Davis
- June 8
  - Larry Colton
  - Pete Magrini
- June 17 – Luis Peraza
- June 22 – Roy Heiser
- June 27 – Danny Breeden
- June 28 – Tom Fletcher

=== July ===
- July 4 – Hal Lanier
- July 11 – John Sevcik
- July 14 – Juan Ríos
- July 15 – Don Bosch
- July 16 – John Purdin
- July 17 – Don Kessinger
- July 20 – Mickey Stanley
- July 21 – Mike Hegan
- July 22 – Frank Johnson
- July 24 – Cotton Nash
- July 26 – José Martínez
- July 27 – Jack Hiatt

=== August ===
- August 4
  - Ángel Bravo
  - Cleon Jones
- August 7 – Gary Dotter
- August 9 – Tommie Agee
- August 11 – Sal Campisi
- August 15 – Cap Peterson
- August 20 – Fred Norman
- August 23
  - Dave Dowling
  - Danny Murphy
- August 25 – Shaun Fitzmaurice
- August 29 – Dan Schneider
- August 31
  - Tom Dukes
  - Ramón Webster

=== September ===
- September 8 – Steve Hargan
- September 9 – Ron Stone
- September 21
  - Sam McDowell
  - Bill Wilson
- September 23
  - Jim Rooker
  - Woody Woodward
- September 24 – Chuck Nieson
- September 28 – Grant Jackson

=== October ===
- October 6 – Jerry Grote
- October 8 – Bill Landis
- October 13 – Bob Bailey
- October 16 – Pete Lovrich
- October 17 – Pete Cimino
- October 18
  - Vern Holtgrave
  - Willie Horton
- October 22 – Cecil Upshaw
- October 31 – Dave McNally

=== November ===
- November 2 – Ron Reed
- November 4 – Jack Whillock
- November 5 – Richie Scheinblum
- November 6 – Jim Gosger
- November 19 – Larry Haney
- November 23 – Jerry Nyman
- November 24 – Fred Beene
- November 25 – Bobby Etheridge

=== December ===
- December 3 – José Peña
- December 4 – Dick Billings
- December 5 – Steve Shea
- December 6 – Arnold Umbach
- December 7 – Alex Johnson
- December 13 – Ferguson Jenkins
- December 14 – Jim Roland
- December 21 – Pete Charton
- December 22 – Jack Jenkins
- December 23 – Jerry Koosman
- December 27 – Byron Browne

== Deaths ==
=== January ===
- January 4 – Herold Juul, 48, pitcher for the 1914 Brooklyn Tip-Tops of the Federal League, then considered an "outlaw" circuit.
- January 8 – Harry Pearce, 52, second baseman who played from 1917 through 1919 for the Philadelphia Phillies.
- January 10 – Willis Wyman, 82, outfielder for Kansas City and Columbus/Pittsburgh of the short-lived Union Association, a major league that existed during the 1884 season.
- January 22 – Louis Santop, 52, Hall of Fame catcher (elected 2006) in the Negro leagues, whose career extended from 1910 to 1926; an amazing .406 lifetime hitter and the first legitimate home run slugger in Black baseball history.
- January 26 – Bill Francis, 62, third baseman and manager whose career in Black baseball lasted from 1906 to 1925.
- January 31
  - Henry Larkin, 82, first baseman and manager who hit .303 in ten seasons (1884–1893) with the Philadelphia Athletics (American Association), Cleveland Infants (Players' League) and Washington Senators (National League); served as Cleveland's playing skipper from Opening Day to August 1, 1890.
  - Ed Phelps, 62, catcher who played with four teams in 11 seasons spanning 1902–1913, and a member of the Pittsburgh Pirates teams who captured the 1902 and 1903 National League pennants and played in the 1903 World Series.

=== February ===
- February 3
  - Frank Luce, 45, outfielder who played for the Pittsburgh Pirates in the 1923 season.
  - Happy Finneran, 51, pitcher who played for the Philadelphia Phillies, Brooklyn Tip-Tops, Detroit Tigers and New York Yankees, in a span of five seasons from 1912 to 1918.
- February 7 – Joe Poetz, 41, pitcher who played in two games for the New York Giants in 1926.
- February 9 – John Fischer, 86, pitcher who played from 1884 to 1885 with the Philadelphia Keystones and the Buffalo Bisons.
- February 10 – George Ziegler, 75 or 76, pitcher who appeared in one game for the Pittsburgh Alleghenys on June 19, 1890.
- February 16 – Orson Baldwin, 60, pitcher for the 1908 St. Louis Cardinals.
- February 26 – Murray Gillispie, 33 or 34, left-handed pitcher for Memphis and Chicago of the Negro National League (1932) and Memphis and Monroe of the Negro Southern League (1932).

=== March ===
- March 1 – Bill Delaney, 78, second baseman for the 1890 Cleveland Spiders of the National League.
- March 3
  - John Buckley, 72, pitcher who played with the Buffalo Bisons of the Players' League in 1890.
  - Clay Fauver, 69, pitcher for the Louisville Colonels of the National League in 1899; a distinguished college professor and athletic coach both in baseball and football at Miami University (Ohio) and Oberlin College.
  - Dan O'Connor, 73, Canadian first baseman who appeared in six games with the Louisville Colonels club who won the 1890 American Association pennant.
- March 4 – Jack Hammond, 51, second baseman who played for the Cleveland Indians in 1915 and divided his playing time with Cleveland and the Pittsburgh Pirates in 1922.
- March 5 – Dutch Wetzel, 48, outfielder who played for the St. Louis Browns of the American League in the 1920 and 1921 seasons.
- March 12 – Owen Conway, 51, third baseman who played for the Philadelphia Athletics during the 1915 season.
- March 13 – Gene Steere, 69, shortstop for the 1894 Pittsburgh Pirates.
- March 22 – Bob Vail, 60, Maine native and right-handed pitcher who worked in four games for the 1908 Pirates.
- March 26 – Jimmy Burke, 67, third baseman who played in 550 games for five MLB clubs, notably the St. Louis Cardinals, between 1898 and 1905 and the Cardinals' player-manager from May 4 to August 9, 1905; manager of the St. Louis Browns from June 28, 1918 through 1920, and coached for the Detroit Tigers, Boston Red Sox, Chicago Cubs and New York Yankees for 15 seasons between 1914 and 1933.
- March 31 – Ray O'Brien, 47, backup outfielder for the 1916 Pittsburgh Pirates.

=== April ===
- April 3 – John Rudderham, 78, left fielder who appeared in one game with the Boston Reds of the Union Association in its 1884 season.
- April 8 – Pat Bohen, 51, pitcher who played from 1913 to 1914 for the Philadelphia Athletics and Pittsburgh Pirates.
- April 11 – Norm McNeil, 49, reserve catcher who played briefly for the Boston Red Sox during the 1919 season.
- April 26
  - Al Montgomery, 21, catcher who appeared in 42 games for the Boston Braves in 1941; killed in a car accident in Virginia shortly after start of 1942 minor-league season.
  - Hack Simmons, 57, infielder and outfielder who spent two seasons in the American League with the Detroit Tigers (1910) and New York Highlanders (1912), before moving to the outlaw Federal League to play for the Baltimore Terrapins (1914–1915).

=== May ===
- May 9 – Herm Malloy, 56, pitcher for the Detroit Tigers teams who won the American League pennants in the 1907 and 1908 seasons.
- May 13 – C. J. McDiarmid, 72, executive with the St. Louis Browns and Cincinnati Reds between 1907 and 1929; president and principal owner of Reds from 1927 to 1929.
- May 15 – Larry Milton, 63, pitcher who played for the St. Louis Cardinals in 1903.
- May 20 – Amby McConnell, 59, second baseman who played from 1908 through 1911 for the Boston Red Sox and Chicago White Sox; lined into the first unassisted triple play in MLB history (July 19, 1909); set the Red Sox' record for most stolen bases in a season by a rookie with 31 (1908), which stood until it was broken by Jacoby Ellsbury (2008).
- May 25 – "Big Bill" James, 55, pitcher in 203 games for five AL teams during all or part of eight seasons between 1911 and 1919; one of the honest members on the 1919 Chicago White Sox club made infamous by the Black Sox Scandal.
- May 26 – Ed Gremminger, 68, third baseman who played for the Cleveland Spiders, Boston Beaneaters and Detroit Tigers in part of four seasons between 1895 and 1904.
- May 28
  - Charley Bassett, 79, infielder for five National League teams in a span of eight seasons from 1884 to 1892, who led the league's second basemen in assists in 1887, and fielding percentage in 1887 and 1890.
  - Mike Welday, 63, outfielder who played for the Chicago White Sox in 1907 and 1909.
- May 30
  - Ed Burns, 54, catcher who played from 1912 to 1918 for the St. Louis Cardinals and Philadelphia Phillies.
  - Lee Fyfe, 62, umpire who officiated in the Federal League in 1915 and the National League in 1920.

=== June ===
- June 1 – Danny Friend, 69, pitcher who played for the Chicago Colts of the National League from 1895 through 1898.
- June 10 – Matt Zieser, 53, pitcher for the 1914 Boston Red Sox.
- June 26 – Gene Stack, 24, pitcher in the Chicago White Sox minor league system, who in December 1940 became the first player on a Major League roster to be drafted for World War II service; died after hurling for his base's (Fort Custer) team.
- June 29 – Manuel Cueto, 50, Cuban outfielder who spent more than 20 years in professional baseball, including stints with the St. Louis Terriers in 1914 and the Cincinnati Reds from 1917 until 1919.
- June 30 – Cad Coles, 56, outfielder who played for the 1914 Kansas City Packers of the Federal League.

=== July ===
- July 7 – Harry Spies, 76, first baseman and catcher who played for the Louisville Colonels and Cincinnati Reds during the 1895 season.
- July 17 – Lefty Johnson, 79, outfielder for the Philadelphia Keystones, Indianapolis Hoosiers and Baltimore Orioles in parts of five seasons from 1884 to 1892.
- July 30 – Jim Baskette, 54, pitcher for the Cleveland Naps from 1911 until 1913.

=== August ===
- August 3
  - Lyle Bigbee, 48, pitcher/outfielder in 17 games for the 1920 Philadelphia Atletics and 1921 Pittsburgh Pirates.
  - Jack Hayden, 61, outfielder who played for the 1901 Athletics, 1906 Boston Americans and 1908 Chicago Cubs.
  - Jack Sutthoff, 69, pitcher who worked for four National League clubs, notably Cincinnati and Pittsburgh, between 1898 and 1905.
- August 6 – Gordon McNaughton, 32, pitcher in six games for the 1932 Boston Red Sox.
- August 19 – Jesse Duryea, 82, right-hander who hurled for three teams between 1889 and 1893; won 32 games in 1889 for Cincinnati of the then-major-league American Association.
- August 20 – John McCarty, 75, pitcher for the 1889 Kansas City Cowboys of the American Association.
- August 28 – Bill Rariden, 54, catcher who worked in 982 games over 12 seasons for Boston, New York and Cincinnati of the National League and Newark of the Federal League between 1909 and 1920; two-time (1917, 1919) World Series champion who started five games of the eight-game 1919 Fall Classic, including the Reds' clinching victory.

=== September ===
- September 2
  - Frank Martin, 64, third baseman for Louisville, Chicago and New York of the National League from 1897–1899.
  - Henry Thielman, 61, pitcher for the New York Giants, Cincinnati Reds and Brooklyn Superbas in 1902–1903.
- September 7
  - Ulysses "Joe" Brown, 25, catcher for six Negro leagues clubs between 1937 and 1942, notably the Newark Eagles and Cleveland Buckeyes; fatally injured when a truck collided with a car carrying Buckeyes personnel on a road trip. (See Events above).
  - Smoky Owens, 30, pitcher/outfielder for the Buckeyes, who died with Brown in the same accident; posted a stellar 8–1 season and a Negro American League-leading 1.90 ERA for an earlier Cleveland team, the Bears, in 1939.
- September 22 – Wiley Davis, 67, pitcher for the 1896 Cincinnati Reds.
- September 23 – "Savage Tom" Thomas, 67, pitcher for Cleveland (1894) and St. Louis (1899–1900) of the National League.
- September 26 – Joe Giannini, 54, shortstop for the 1911 Boston Red Sox; appeared in one game on August 7.
- September 27 – Charlie Jaeger, 67, pitcher for the 1904 Detroit Tigers.

=== October ===
- October 3 – Pinky Hargrave, 46, catcher for the Washington Senators, St. Louis Browns, Detroit Tigers and Boston Braves between 1923 and 1930; member, Washington's 1924 World Series champions.
- October 25 – Jimsey Roussell, 42, center fielder for the 1929 Birmingham Black Barons and 1930 Memphis Red Sox of the Negro National League.
- October 28 – Dan Coogan, 67, catcher/shortstop for Washington of the National League in 1895; served as head baseball coach of four U.S. colleges, including his alma mater, the University of Pennsylvania.

=== November ===
- November 7
  - Birdie Cree, 60, outfielder who spent his entire career with the New York Highlanders/Yankees from 1908 to 1915, while hitting .292 in 742 games.
  - Lev Shreve, 76, pitcher/outfielder for Baltimore of the American Association (AA) in 1887 and Indianapolis of the National League from 1887 to 1889.
- November 8 – Jim Handiboe, 76, pitcher/right fielder for Pittsburgh (AA) in 1886.
- November 13 – Izzy Hoffman, 67, outfielder who got into 29 total games for the 1904 Washington Senators and 1907 Boston Doves.
- November 14 – Scrappy Carroll, 82, outfielder for three teams from 1884 to 1887.
- November 15 – Joe Gunson, 79, catcher/outfielder who played in all or part of four seasons in the majors for five different teams in 1884, 1889 and 1892–1893.
- November 22 – Ben Caffyn, 63, outfielder who appeared in 30 games for the 1906 Cleveland Naps.
- November 24 – Frank Owen, 62, pitcher for the Detroit Tigers and Chicago White Sox from 1901 to 1908, who posted an 82–67 record with a 2.55 ERA.
- November 29 – Bob Bescher, 58, switch-hitting outfielder for four teams, primarily the Cincinnati Reds, who led the NL in stolen bases for four consecutive seasons (1909 through 1912).
- November 30 – Slim Love, 52, tall and lanky southpaw—6 ft 6 in (1.98 m) tall and 195 pounds (88 kg)—who posted a 28–21 record with a 3.04 ERA in six seasons with the Washington Senators (1913), New York Yankees (1916–1918) and Detroit Tigers (1929–1920).

=== December ===
- December 1 – Frank Connaughton, 73, shortstop/outfielder who played in the National League for Boston (1894 and 1906) and New York (1896).
- December 3 – Chad Kimsey, 36, who appeared in 222 games, 198 as a pitcher, for the St. Louis Browns, Chicago White Sox and Detroit Tigers over six seasons between 1929 and 1936.
- December 5
  - Ed Eiteljorge, 71, native of Germany who pitched for Chicago (NL) in 1890 and Washington (American Association) in 1891.
  - Val Picinich, 46, catcher in 1,307 games for the Philadelphia Athletics, Washington Senators, Boston Red Sox, Cincinnati Reds, Brooklyn Robins/Dodgers and Pittsburgh Pirates between 1916 and 1933.
- December 6 – Amos Rusie, 71, "The Hoosier Thunderbolt," Hall-of-Fame fireballer whose powerful delivery was the main reason pitching mound was moved in 1893 from 50 feet (15 m) to its present 60 feet 6 inches (18.44 m); compiled a 246–174 record, 1,950 strikeouts and 3.07 ERA in a 463-game career spent primarily with the New York Giants (1890–1895; 1897–1898); won 30 or more games four consecutive seasons, and 20+ games eight successive times; led NL in strikeouts for five years and led or tied in most shutouts five times; hurled a no-hitter on July 31, 1891; in 1894, won a "pitching Triple Crown"—a 36–13 mark, 195 strikeouts and 2.78 ERA—plus two games in the Giants' sweep of the Baltimore Orioles in the first-ever Temple Cup championship series.
- December 21 – Ira Davis, 72, infielder who appeared in six games for the 1899 Giants.
- December 25 – Whitey Alpermann, 63, second baseman for the 1906–1909 Brooklyn Superbas.
