= 1969 San Francisco Giants season =

1969 San Francisco Giants
- League: National League
- Division: West
- Ballpark: Candlestick Park
- City: San Francisco, California
- Owners: Horace Stoneham
- General managers: Chub Feeney
- Managers: Clyde King
- Television: KTVU (Russ Hodges, Lon Simmons, Bill Thompson)
- Radio: KSFO (Russ Hodges, Lon Simmons, Bill Thompson, Bill Rigney)

The 1969 San Francisco Giants season was the Giants' 87th season in Major League Baseball, their 12th season in San Francisco since their move from New York following the 1957 season, and their tenth at Candlestick Park. The team finished second in the newly established National League West with a record of 90–72, 3 games behind the Atlanta Braves, their fifth consecutive season of finishing second. The Giants set a Major League record which still stands for the most double plays grounded into by a team in a single game, with 7 against the Houston Astros on May 4.

== Offseason ==
- October 14, 1968: Jesús Alou was drafted from the Giants by the Montreal Expos as the 13th pick in the 1968 MLB expansion draft.
- December 6, 1968: Nate Oliver was traded by the Giants to the New York Yankees for Charley Smith.
- March 16, 1969, Giants pitching prospect Néstor Chávez was killed in a plane crash
- March 28, 1969: Charley Smith was purchased from the Giants by the Chicago Cubs.

== Regular season ==
- July 20, 1969: Pitcher Gaylord Perry hit the first home run of his career (he hit 6). It was in the third inning off pitcher Claude Osteen.

=== Season standings ===
NL West
Team	W	L	Pct.	GB	Home	Road
Atlanta Braves	93	69	.574	—	50‍–‍31	43‍–‍38
San Francisco Giants	90	72	.556	3	52‍–‍29	38‍–‍43
Cincinnati Reds	89	73	.549	4	50‍–‍31	39‍–‍42
Los Angeles Dodgers	85	77	.525	8	50‍–‍31	35‍–‍46
Houston Astros	81	81	.500	12	52‍–‍29	29‍–‍52
San Diego Padres	52	110	.321	41	28‍–‍53	24‍–‍57

=== Record vs. opponents ===
1969 National League record Sources:
Team	ATL	CHC	CIN	HOU	LAD	MON	NYM	PHI	PIT	SD	SF	STL
Atlanta	—	3–9	12–6	15–3	9–9	8–4	4–8	6–6	8–4	13–5	9–9	6–6
Chicago	9–3	—	6–6–1	8–4	6–6	10–8	8–10	12–6	7–11	11–1	6–6	9–9
Cincinnati	6–12	6–6–1	—	9–9	10–8	8–4	6–6	10–2	5–7	11–7	10–8	8–4
Houston	3–15	4–8	9–9	—	6–12	11–1	10–2	8–4	3–9	10–8	10–8	7–5
Los Angeles	9–9	6–6	8–10	12–6	—	10–2	4–8	8–4	8–4	12–6	5–13	3–9
Montreal	4–8	8–10	4–8	1–11	2–10	—	5–13	11–7	5–13	4–8	1–11	7–11
New York	8–4	10–8	6–6	2–10	8–4	13–5	—	12–6	10–8	11–1	8–4	12–6
Philadelphia	6-6	6–12	2–10	4–8	4–8	7–11	6–12	—	10–8	8–4	3–9	7–11
Pittsburgh	4–8	11–7	7–5	9–3	4–8	13–5	8–10	8–10	—	10–2	5–7	9–9
San Diego	5–13	1–11	7–11	8–10	6–12	8–4	1–11	4–8	2–10	—	6–12	4–8
San Francisco	9–9	6–6	8–10	8–10	13–5	11–1	4–8	9–3	7–5	12–6	—	3–9
St. Louis	6–6	9–9	4–8	5–7	9–3	11–7	6–12	11–7	9–9	8–4	9–3	—

=== Opening Day starters ===
- Bobby Bonds
- Dick Dietz
- Bobby Etheridge
- Jim Ray Hart
- Ron Hunt
- Hal Lanier
- Juan Marichal
- Willie Mays
- Willie McCovey

=== Notable transactions ===
- August 8, 1969: The Giants traded a player to be named later to the Detroit Tigers for Don McMahon. The Giants completed the deal by sending César Gutiérrez to the Tigers on September 2.

=== Roster ===
1969 San Francisco Giants
Roster
Pitchers: 42 Bobby Bolin; 26 Ron Bryant; 41 Mike Davison; 39 Bob Garibaldi; 28 Joe Gibbon; 34 Ron Herbel; 28 Ron Kline; 35 Frank Linzy; 27 Juan Marichal; 40 Mike McCormick; 47 Don McMahon; 36 Gaylord Perry; 45 Rich Robertson; 37 Ray Sadecki	Catchers: 1 Bob Barton; 2 Dick Dietz; 32 John Harrell; 7 Jack Hiatt; 10 John Stephenson; Infielders: 19 Bob Burda; 12 Jim Davenport; 17 Bobby Etheridge; 29 Tito Fuentes; 31 César Gutiérrez; 33 Ron Hunt; 22 Hal Lanier; 21 Don Mason; 44 Willie McCovey	Outfielders: 25 Bobby Bonds; 14 George Foster; 16 Jim Ray Hart; 15 Ken Henderson; 20 Frank Johnson; 18 Dave Marshall; 24 Willie Mays; 38 Leon Wagner; Other batters: 3 Ozzie Virgil	Manager: 23 Clyde King; Coaches: 46 Larry Jansen (Pitching); 3 Ozzie Virgil (Third base); 9 Wes Westrum (First base)

== Player stats ==
= Indicates team leader

= Indicates league leader

=== Batting ===
==== Starters by position ====
Note: Pos = Position; G = Games played; AB = At bats; R = Runs scored; H = Hits; Avg. = Batting average; HR = Home runs; RBI = Runs batted in; SB = Stolen bases

Pos.	Player	G	AB	R	H	Avg.	HR	RBI	SB
C	Dick Dietz	79	244	28	56	.230	11	35	0
1B	Willie McCovey	149	491	101	157	.320	45	126	0
2B	Ron Hunt	128	478	72	125	.262	3	41	9
3B	Jim Davenport	112	303	20	73	.241	2	42	0
SS	Hal Lanier	150	495	37	113	.228	0	35	0
LF	Dave Marshall	110	267	32	62	.232	2	33	1
CF	Willie Mays	117	403	64	114	.283	13	58	6
RF	Bobby Bonds	158	622	120*	161	.259	32	90	45

- Tied with Pete Rose

==== Other batters ====
Note: G = Games played; AB = At bats; R = Runs scored; H = Hits; Avg. = Batting average; HR = Home runs; RBI = Runs batted in; SB = Stolen bases

Player	G	AB	R	H	Avg.	HR	RBI	SB
Ken Henderson	113	374	42	84	.225	6	44	6
Don Mason	104	250	43	57	.228	0	13	1
Jim Ray Hart	95	236	27	60	.254	3	26	0
Jack Hiatt	69	194	18	38	.196	7	34	0
Tito Fuentes	67	183	28	54	.295	1	14	2
Bob Burda	97	161	20	37	.230	6	27	0
Bobby Etheridge	56	131	13	34	.260	1	10	0
Bob Barton	49	106	5	18	.170	0	1	0
John Stephenson	22	27	2	6	.222	0	3	0
César Gutiérrez	15	23	4	5	.217	0	0	1
Leon Wagner	11	12	0	4	.333	0	2	0
Frank Johnson	7	10	2	1	.100	0	0	0
John Harrell	2	6	0	3	.500	0	2	0
George Foster	9	5	1	2	.400	0	1	0
Ozzie Virgil	1	1	0	0	.000	0	0	0

=== Pitching ===
==== Starting pitchers ====
Note: G = Games pitched; GS = Games started; IP = Innings pitched; W = Wins; L = Losses; ERA = Earned run average; BB = Walks allowed; SO = Strikeouts

Player	G	GS	IP	W	L	ERA	BB	SO
Gaylord Perry	40	39	325.1	19	14	2.49	91	233
Juan Marichal	37	36	299.2	21	11	2.10	54	205
Mike McCormick	32	28	196.2	11	9	3.34	77	76
Bobby Bolin	30	22	146.1	7	7	4.43	49	102
Ray Sadecki	29	17	138.1	5	8	4.23	53	104

==== Other pitchers ====
Note: G = Games pitched; IP = Innings pitched; W = Wins; L = Losses; ERA = Earned run average; SO = Strikeouts

Player	G	IP	W	L	ERA	SO
Ron Bryant	16	57.2	4	3	4.37	30
Rich Robertson	17	44.1	1	3	5.48	20
Ron Kline	7	11.0	0	2	4.09	7
Mike Davison	1	2.0	0	0	4.50	2

==== Relief pitchers ====
Note: G = Games pitched; IP = Innings pitched; W = Wins; L = Losses; SV = Saves; ERA = Earned run average; SO = Strikeouts

Player	G	IP	W	L	SV	ERA	SO
Frank Linzy	58	116.1	14	9	11	3.64	62
Ron Herbel	39	87.1	4	1	1	4.02	34
Joe Gibbon	16	20.0	1	3	0	3.60	9
Don McMahon	13	23.2	3	1	2	3.04	21

== Awards and honors ==
All-Star Game

== Farm system ==
Level	Team	League	Manager
AAA	Phoenix Giants	Pacific Coast League	Charlie Fox
AA	Amarillo Giants	Texas League	Andy Gilbert
A	Fresno Giants	California League	Dennis Sommers
A	Decatur Commodores	Midwest League	Frank Funk
Rookie	Great Falls Giants	Pioneer League	Harvey Koepf
