= Frank Reberger =

American baseball player and coach (born 1944)

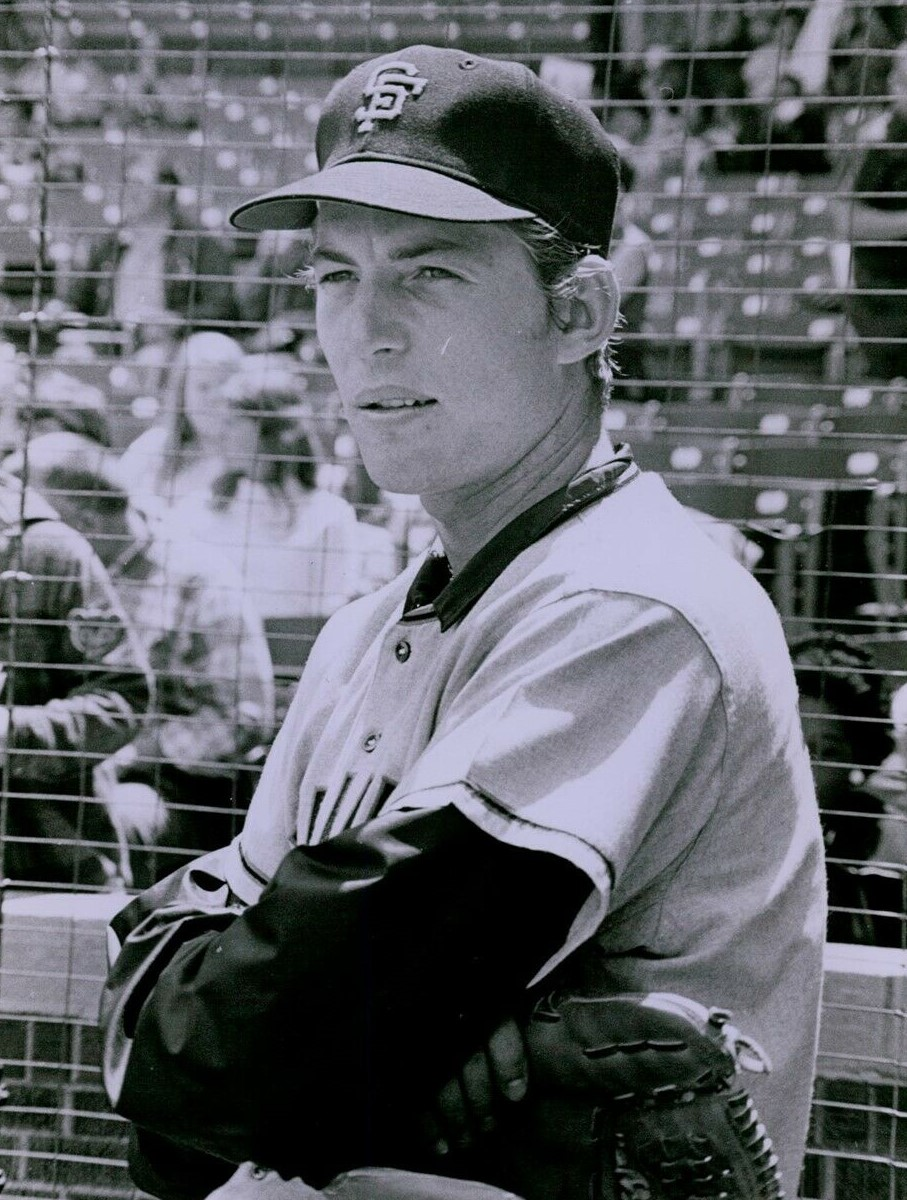
- Pitcher
- Born: June 7, 1944 (age 82); Caldwell, Idaho, U.S.
- Batted: Left Threw: Right

MLB debut
- June 6, 1968, for the Chicago Cubs

Last MLB appearance
- September 24, 1972, for the San Francisco Giants

MLB statistics
- Win–loss record: 14–15
- Earned run average: 4.52
- Strikeouts: 258
- Stats at Baseball Reference

Teams
- Chicago Cubs (1968); San Diego Padres (1969); San Francisco Giants (1970–1972)

Frank Beall Reberger (born June 7, 1944) is an American former professional baseball pitcher and coach in Major League Baseball. He played for the Chicago Cubs, San Diego Padres, and San Francisco Giants from 1968 to 1972.

== Early life and amateur career ==
Born and raised in Caldwell, Idaho, Reberger graduated from Caldwell High School in 1962 and attended the University of Idaho, where he played college baseball for the Idaho Vandals. The Vandals won the inaugural Big Sky title in 1964, and again in 1966, and played in the NCAA playoffs for the first time. They eliminated Colorado State College (now Northern Colorado) and Air Force with three straight road victories and advanced to the District 7 finals, today's "super-regionals" (sweet 16). One round from the College World Series, Idaho lost to Arizona in Tucson, which ended their best-ever season at 34–9 (.791).

== Professional career ==
=== Playing career ===
Undrafted in the 1966 MLB draft, he was signed as a free agent by the Chicago Cubs, who had selected Vandal pitching ace Bill Stoneman in the 31st round. Reberger began his professional career in his hometown with the Treasure Valley Cubs in the Pioneer League in 1966. The following season, he played with the Single-A Lodi Crushers in the California League and the Dallas–Fort Worth Spurs in the Double-A Texas League. He moved up to Triple-A in 1968 with the Tacoma Cubs in the Pacific Coast League.

Reberger made his major league debut with the Cubs in 1968 a day before his 24th birthday, throwing two hitless innings at Wrigley Field on June 6. That October, he was selected by the San Diego Padres in the expansion draft and spent the 1969 season with them. He was traded in December to the San Francisco Giants for Bobby Etheridge, Bob Barton, and Ron Herbel. Rebeger pitched for the Giants in 1970, 1971, and 1972, and for their Pacific Coast League affiliate in Phoenix in 1973 and 1974.

In the majors, Reberger appeared in 148 games with 37 starts. He had a 14–15 record with a 4.52 ERA and 258 strikeouts in 388.2 innings.

=== Managerial career ===
Reberger served as a major league coach and roving pitching instructor for the California Angels in 1991–1992 and the Florida Marlins in 1993 and 1994. He has managed in the minors for many years, primarily in the San Francisco Giants farm system and also in the independent leagues.

Reberger became the pitching coach for the Uni-President 7-Eleven Lions in 2008.

== Personal life ==
Frank is married to Joan (Edquist) Reberger and has one son, Justin. Joan and Frank reside in Washington State.
