= Dick Dietz =

American baseball player (1941–2005)

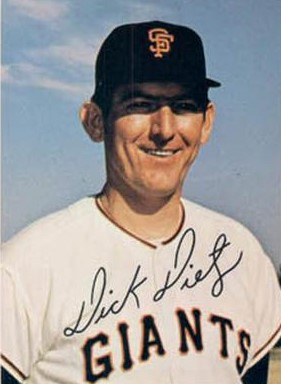
- Catcher
- Born: September 18, 1941; Crawfordsville, Indiana, U.S.
- Died: June 28, 2005 (aged 63); Clayton, Georgia, U.S.
- Batted: Right Threw: Right

MLB debut
- June 18, 1966, for the San Francisco Giants

Last MLB appearance
- September 30, 1973, for the Atlanta Braves

MLB statistics
- Batting average: .261
- Home runs: 66
- Runs batted in: 301
- Stats at Baseball Reference

Teams
- San Francisco Giants (1966–1971); Los Angeles Dodgers (1972); Atlanta Braves (1973)

Career highlights and awards
- All-Star (1970); San Francisco Giants Wall of Fame

Richard Allen Dietz (September 18, 1941 – June 28, 2005) was an American professional baseball player and manager. He played in Major League Baseball as a catcher from 1966 to 1973, most prominently as a member of the San Francisco Giants where he was an All-Star player and was a member of the team that won the 1971 National League Western Division title. He also played for the Los Angeles Dodgers and the Atlanta Braves. After his playing career, Dietz worked as a minor league manager in the Giants organization.

== Playing career ==
Born in Crawfordsville, Indiana, Dietz was signed by the San Francisco Giants as an amateur free agent out of Greenville, South Carolina before the start of the 1960 season. He showed some promise as a hitter, posting a .354 batting average with 35 home runs and 101 runs batted in while playing for the El Paso Sun Kings in the Texas League in 1963.

Dietz made his major league debut with the Giants on June 18, 1966 at the age of 24. Nicknamed Mule, he played as the Giants backup catcher behind Tom Haller in 1967. In September, Dietz was named to the 1967 Topps All-Star Rookie Team. In February 1968, the Giants were in need of good infielders, and with four young catching prospects in their system, including Dietz, club president Chub Feeney decided to trade Haller along with a player to be named later, to the Los Angeles Dodgers for Ron Hunt and Nate Oliver. Dietz shared catching duties with Jack Hiatt and Bob Barton in 1968, producing a .272 batting average with 6 home runs and 38 runs batted in.

Dietz was featured prominently in a controversial umpiring decision during the 1968 season. The Giants were facing Dodgers' pitcher Don Drysdale, who was in the midst of a scoreless inning streak that eventually reached a record-setting 58 2/3 innings. The Giants had the bases loaded with no outs and Dietz at bat. Dietz was hit by a pitch, apparently ending Drysdale's scoreless innings streak. However, home plate umpire Harry Wendelstedt, citing a rarely enforced rule, refused to allow Dietz to take first base, claiming that Dietz did not attempt to avoid being struck by the ball. Drysdale then retired Dietz and the next two batters, keeping his scoreless streak alive. Dietz was the Giants catcher on September 17, 1968, when Gaylord Perry pitched a no-hitter against the St. Louis Cardinals. In 1969, Dietz continued to share the catching duties with Hiatt and Barton. When the other two players were traded before the start of the 1970 season, Dietz became the Giants' regular starting catcher.

In his first season as a full-time player in 1970, Dietz hit for a .337 batting average with 18 home runs and 77 runs batted in at mid-season. Although he was not listed on the All-Star ballot and received few write-in votes, the manager for the National League All-Star team, Gil Hodges, named Dietz as a reserve player for the National League team. In the 1970 All-Star Game, Dietz replaced Johnny Bench in the top of the seventh inning and led off the bottom of the ninth inning with a home run off Catfish Hunter that helped spark a rally that tied the game. The National League went on to win the game in the twelfth inning with a climactic collision at home plate between Pete Rose and Ray Fosse (It was Dietz who was in the on deck circle, congratulating Rose immediately after the collision). He ended the 1970 season with career-highs in batting average (.300), home runs (22), runs batted in (107), walks (109) and in on-base percentage (.426). As of 2024, Dietz remains the only catcher in Major League Baseball history to record at least 100 walks, 100 runs batted in and a .300 batting average in one season.

Dietz was an integral member of the 1971 Giants team that clinched the National League Western Division title. The Giants had a nine-game lead over the Los Angeles Dodgers on August 1, but held on during a pennant race to win the division by a narrow one-game margin. Dietz caught every game during the tense final stages of the season, and provided offensive support with 19 home runs and 72 runs batted in. In the only post-season appearance of his career, Dietz had only one hit in 15 at-bats, as the Giants lost to the eventual world champion Pittsburgh Pirates in the 1971 National League Championship Series.

In 1972, Dietz fell from favor with the Giants' management for his role as player representative during the 1972 Major League Baseball strike that delayed the start of the season. Other reports stated that the Giants gave up on Dietz because of his defensive liabilities, having led National League catchers in passed balls in 1970 and 1971. Soon after the strike was settled, he was claimed off waivers by the Los Angeles Dodgers. Dietz broke his wrist on July 30 and missed much of the 1972 season. In 1973, Dietz had an excellent season as a reserve first baseman and catcher for the Braves, batting .295 with a .474 on-base percentage. However, the Braves released him after the season, and after no team signed him for 1974, Dietz' career was over at the age of 32.

== Career statistics ==
In an eight-year major league career, Dietz played in 646 games, accumulating 478 hits in 1,829 at bats for a .261 career batting average along with 66 home runs, 301 runs batted in and an on-base percentage of .390. Among major league catchers, he ranks third overall in career on-base percentage behind only Mickey Cochrane and Wally Schang. Although he was better known for his power hitting, he was a capable defensive catcher, ending his career with a .981 fielding percentage.

== Later life ==
After his retirement as a player, Dietz served as a minor league coach and manager. He managed the San Jose Giants in 1993 and 1994, the Sioux Falls Canaries in 1995 and the Sonoma County Crushers from 1996 to 1999.

Dietz died at age 63 of a heart attack in Clayton, Georgia on June 28, 2005. He was survived by his wife and children.
