= 1970 Major League Baseball All-Star Game =

1970 American baseball competition

| | 1 | 2 | 3 | 4 | 5 | 6 | 7 | 8 | 9 | 10 | 11 | 12 | R | H | E |
|---|---|---|---|---|---|---|---|---|---|---|---|---|---|---|---|
| American League | 0 | 0 | 0 | 0 | 0 | 1 | 1 | 2 | 0 | 0 | 0 | 0 | 4 | 12 | 0 |
| National League | 0 | 0 | 0 | 0 | 0 | 0 | 1 | 0 | 3 | 0 | 0 | 1 | 5 | 10 | 0 |
- Date: July 14, 1970
- Venue: Riverfront Stadium
- City: Cincinnati, Ohio
- Managers: Earl Weaver (BAL); Gil Hodges (NYM)
- MVP: Carl Yastrzemski (BOS)
- Attendance: 51,838
- Ceremonial first pitch: President Richard Nixon
- Television: NBC
- TV announcers: Curt Gowdy, Tony Kubek and Mickey Mantle
- Radio: NBC
- Radio announcers: Jim Simpson and Sandy Koufax

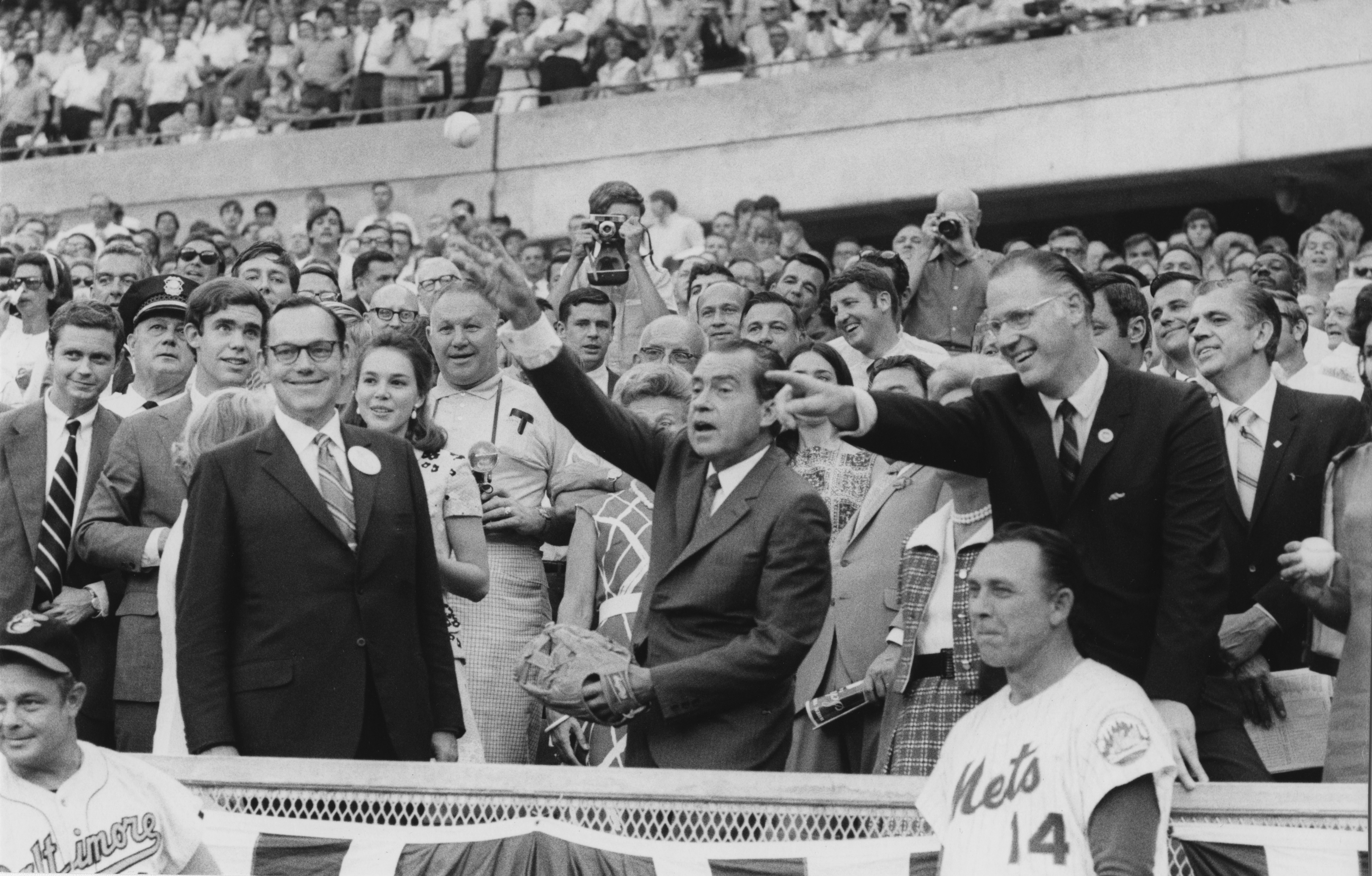
Richard Nixon throwing out the first ball of the game.

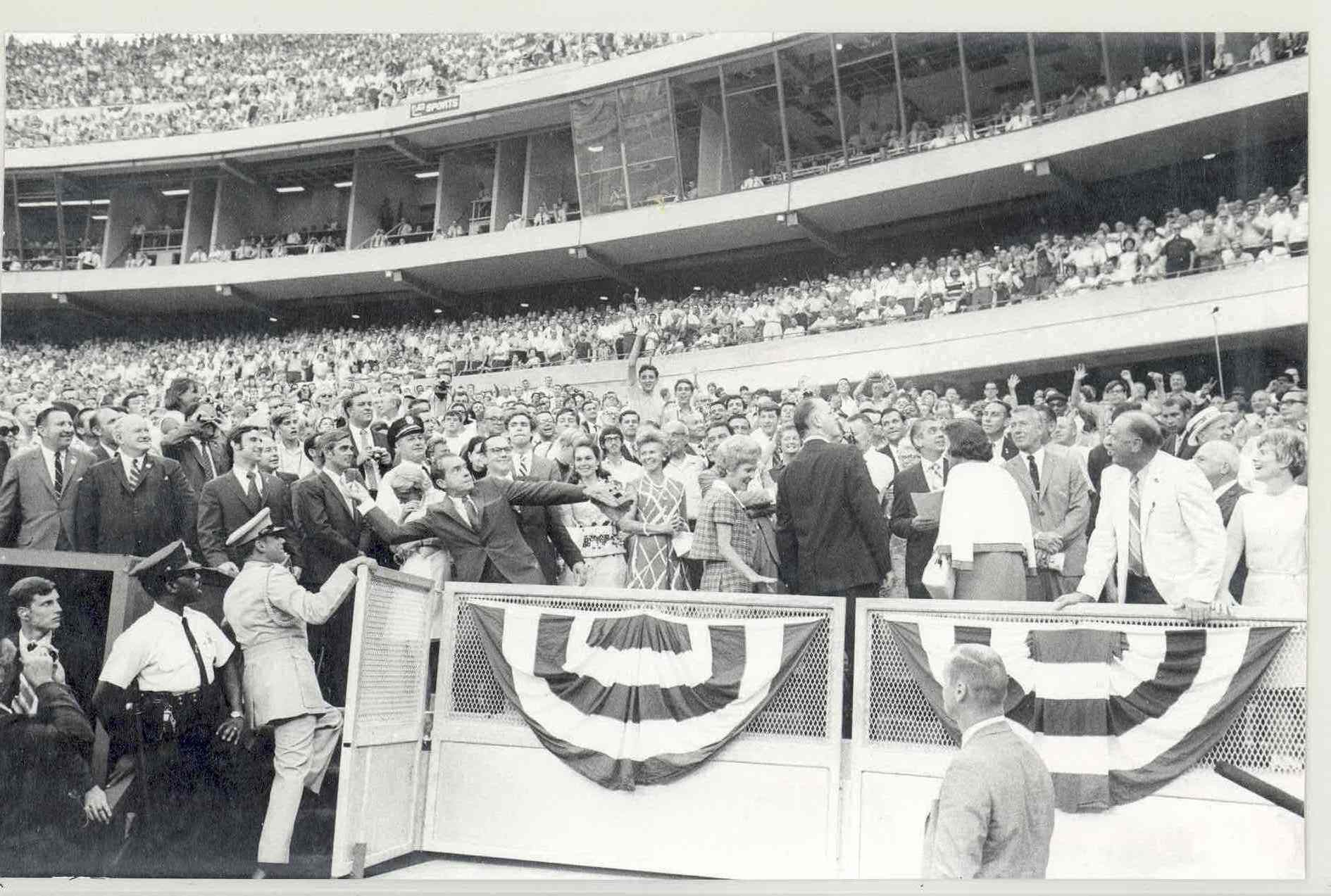
Nixon throwing a ball to the fans.

The 1970 Major League Baseball All-Star Game was the 41st midseason exhibition between the all-stars of the American League (AL) and the National League (NL), the two leagues comprising Major League Baseball. The game was played on the evening of July 14, 1970, at Riverfront Stadium in Cincinnati, Ohio, home of the Cincinnati Reds of the National League, and resulted in a 5–4 victory for the NL.

This was the first MLB All-Star Game ever played at night, coinciding with prime time in the Eastern United States. (The previous year's All-Star Game was originally scheduled to be played at night, but it was rained out and played the following afternoon.) Every All-Star Game since 1970 has been played at night.

Riverfront Stadium had barely been open two weeks when it hosted its first All-Star Game. The game had been hosted by the Cincinnati Reds twice before (1938 and 1953) when their home park was Crosley Field. The Reds would host one more All-Star Game at Riverfront Stadium in 1988. So close was the opening of the stadium and the scheduled exhibition game, that Major League Baseball Commissioner Bowie Kuhn did not confirm that the game would "definitely" be played in Cincinnati until June 1. Atlanta was the alternative site.

Undeniably, the most remembered moment of the game was the final run, scored in the bottom of the twelfth by Pete Rose. The ball was relayed to the American League catcher, Ray Fosse, in time to tag Rose out, but the tenacious Rose bowled Fosse over enough to drop the ball, giving Rose credit for the game-winning run.

== Fan balloting returns ==
For the first time since 1957, Major League Baseball restored the selection of the eight position players on each All-Star team to the fans. Fan balloting had been revoked after ballot-stuffing campaigns over a number of years. To avoid a repeat of the problem, the 26 million ballots were evenly distributed to 75,000 retail outlets, and 150 minor and major league stadiums. Major League Baseball Commissioner Bowie Kuhn also announced a special panel would be in place to review voting to determine if ballot stuffing had occurred.

== American League roster ==
The American League roster included 9 future Hall of Fame players, denoted in italics.

=== Elected Starters ===
| Position | Player | Team | Notes |
|---|---|---|---|
| C | Bill Freehan | Detroit Tigers |
| 1B | Boog Powell | Baltimore Orioles |
| 2B | Rod Carew | Minnesota Twins | injured |
| 3B | Harmon Killebrew | Minnesota Twins |
| SS | Luis Aparicio | Chicago White Sox |
| OF | Frank Howard | Washington Senators |
| OF | Frank Robinson | Baltimore Orioles |
| OF | Carl Yastrzemski | Boston Red Sox |

=== Pitchers ===
| Throws | Pitcher | Team | Notes |
|---|---|---|---|
| LH | Mike Cuellar | Baltimore Orioles | did not pitch |
| RH | Catfish Hunter | Oakland Athletics |
| LH | Sam McDowell | Cleveland Indians |
| LH | Dave McNally | Baltimore Orioles | did not pitch |
| RH | Jim Palmer | Baltimore Orioles | starting pitcher |
| RH | Jim Perry | Minnesota Twins |
| LH | Fritz Peterson | New York Yankees |
| RH | Mel Stottlemyre | New York Yankees |
| LH | Clyde Wright | California Angels |

=== Reserve position players ===
| Position | Player | Team | Notes |
|---|---|---|---|
| C | Ray Fosse | Cleveland Indians |
| C | Jerry Moses | Boston Red Sox | did not play |
| 2B | Sandy Alomar Sr. | California Angels |
| 2B | Davey Johnson | Baltimore Orioles | started for Carew |
| 3B | Tommy Harper | Milwaukee Brewers |
| 3B | Brooks Robinson | Baltimore Orioles |
| SS | Jim Fregosi | California Angels |
| OF | Willie Horton | Detroit Tigers |
| OF | Alex Johnson | California Angels |
| OF | Tony Oliva | Minnesota Twins |
| OF | Amos Otis | Kansas City Royals |
| OF | Roy White | New York Yankees | did not play |

=== Coaching staff ===
| Position | Manager | Team |
|---|---|---|
| Manager | Earl Weaver | Baltimore Orioles |
| Coach | Ralph Houk | New York Yankees |
| Coach | Lefty Phillips | California Angels |

== National League roster ==
The National League roster included 15 future Hall of Fame players and coaches, denoted in italics, as well as all-time hits leader Pete Rose.

=== Elected starters ===
| Position | Player | Team | Notes |
|---|---|---|---|
| C | Johnny Bench | Cincinnati Reds |
| 1B | Dick Allen | St. Louis Cardinals |
| 2B | Glenn Beckert | Chicago Cubs |
| 3B | Tony Pérez | Cincinnati Reds |
| SS | Don Kessinger | Chicago Cubs |
| OF | Hank Aaron | Atlanta Braves |
| OF | Rico Carty | Atlanta Braves |
| OF | Willie Mays | San Francisco Giants |

=== Pitchers ===
| Throws | Pitcher | Team | Notes |
|---|---|---|---|
| RH | Bob Gibson | St. Louis Cardinals |
| LH | Joe Hoerner | Philadelphia Phillies | did not pitch |
| LH | Jim Merritt | Cincinnati Reds |
| LH | Claude Osteen | Los Angeles Dodgers |
| RH | Gaylord Perry | San Francisco Giants |
| RH | Tom Seaver | New York Mets | starting pitcher |
| RH | Wayne Simpson | Cincinnati Reds | did not pitch |
| RH | Hoyt Wilhelm | Atlanta Braves | did not pitch |

=== Reserve position players ===
| Position | Player | Team | Notes |
|---|---|---|---|
| C | Dick Dietz | San Francisco Giants |
| C | Joe Torre | St. Louis Cardinals |
| 1B | Jim Hickman | Chicago Cubs |
| 1B | Willie McCovey | San Francisco Giants |
| 2B | Denis Menke | Houston Astros |
| 2B | Félix Millán | Atlanta Braves | injured |
| 2B | Joe Morgan | Houston Astros |
| 3B | Billy Grabarkewitz | Los Angeles Dodgers |
| SS | Bud Harrelson | New York Mets |
| OF | Roberto Clemente | Pittsburgh Pirates |
| OF | Cito Gaston | San Diego Padres |
| OF | Pete Rose | Cincinnati Reds |
| OF | Rusty Staub | Montreal Expos |

=== Coaching staff ===
| Position | Manager | Team |
|---|---|---|
| Manager | Gil Hodges | New York Mets |
| Coach | Leo Durocher | Chicago Cubs |
| Coach | Lum Harris | Atlanta Braves |

== Starting lineups ==
While the starters were elected by the fans, the batting orders and starting pitchers were selected by the managers.

| American League | | | | National League | | | |
| Order | Player | Team | Position | Order | Player | Team | Position |
|---|---|---|---|---|---|---|---|
| 1 | Luis Aparicio | Chicago White Sox | SS | 1 | Willie Mays | San Francisco Giants | CF |
| 2 | Carl Yastrzemski | Boston Red Sox | CF | 2 | Dick Allen | St. Louis Cardinals | 1B |
| 3 | Frank Robinson | Baltimore Orioles | RF | 3 | Hank Aaron | Atlanta Braves | RF |
| 4 | Boog Powell | Baltimore Orioles | 1B | 4 | Tony Pérez | Cincinnati Reds | 3B |
| 5 | Harmon Killebrew | Minnesota Twins | 3B | 5 | Rico Carty | Atlanta Braves | LF |
| 6 | Frank Howard | Washington Senators | LF | 6 | Johnny Bench | Cincinnati Reds | C |
| 7 | Davey Johnson | Baltimore Orioles | 2B | 7 | Don Kessinger | Chicago Cubs | SS |
| 8 | Bill Freehan | Detroit Tigers | C | 8 | Glenn Beckert | Chicago Cubs | 2B |
| 9 | Jim Palmer | Baltimore Orioles | P | 9 | Tom Seaver | New York Mets | P |

== Umpires ==
| Position | Umpire |
|---|---|
| Home Plate | Al Barlick (NL) |
| First Base | John Rice (AL) |
| Second Base | Frank Secory (NL) |
| Third Base | Bill Haller (AL) |
| Left Field | Frank Dezelan (NL) |
| Right Field | Russ Goetz (AL) |

== Scoring summary ==
Scoring opened in the top of the sixth inning for the AL, with Gaylord Perry pitching in relief for the NL. Ray Fosse singled, and advanced to second on a sacrifice bunt by Sam McDowell. Two batters later, with one out, Carl Yastrzemski singled home Fosse to give the AL a 1–0 lead.

The American League added another run in the top of the seventh inning. With one out, Brooks Robinson singled. Tony Oliva walked, with Robinson advancing to second base. Davey Johnson singled to load the bases. Ray Fosse then hit a sacrifice fly, allowing Robinson to score, pushing the AL advantage to 2–0.

The NL answered in the bottom of the seventh inning. Jim Perry had entered to pitch in relief for the AL, and gave up a single to Bud Harrelson to start the inning. Cito Gaston walked, sending Harrelson to second base. Jim Perry then hit Denis Menke with a pitch to load the bases. Willie McCovey, pinch hitting for Gaylord Perry, grounded into a double play, permitting Harrelson to score and cutting the AL lead to 2–1.

The AL increased their lead in the top of the eighth inning. With one out, Carl Yastrzemski and Willie Horton hit back-to-back singles, putting runners at first and second bases. Amos Otis flew out, permitting Yastrzemski to tag up and move to third. Brooks Robinson tripled, scoring Yastrzemski and Horton. The AL now led 4–1.

In the bottom of the ninth inning, Catfish Hunter entered to pitch in relief for the AL, and promptly gave up a home run to Dick Dietz. Bud Harrelson singled. One batter later, with one out, Joe Morgan singled, sending Harrelson to second base. Fritz Peterson entered to relieve Hunter. The first batter he faced, Willie McCovey, singled, scoring Harrelson, and moving Morgan to third base. Mel Stottlemyre was sent in to relieve Peterson, as Roberto Clemente was sent to pinch hit for the pitcher, Bob Gibson. Clemente hit a sacrifice fly, permitting Morgan to score. The inning ended with Pete Rose striking out. The 4–4 score sent the game to extra innings.

In the bottom of the twelfth, NL batters were facing Clyde Wright, in his second inning of relief pitching for the AL. With two outs, Pete Rose and Billy Grabarkewitz hit back-to-back singles to put runners on first and second bases. Jim Hickman singled to Amos Otis in center field. Otis fired the ball to catcher Ray Fosse as Pete Rose ran past third base, heading to home. Otis' throw was on target on the third base side of home plate, and arrived as Rose reached Fosse. Rose bowled over Fosse, forcing him to drop the ball. Rose scored to end the game.

=== Line score ===
Tuesday, July 14, 1970 8:15 pm (ET) at Riverfront Stadium in Cincinnati, Ohio
| Team | 1 | 2 | 3 | 4 | 5 | 6 | 7 | 8 | 9 | 10 | 11 | 12 | R | H | E |
|---|---|---|---|---|---|---|---|---|---|---|---|---|---|---|---|
| American League | 0 | 0 | 0 | 0 | 0 | 1 | 1 | 2 | 0 | 0 | 0 | 0 | 4 | 12 | 0 |
| National League | 0 | 0 | 0 | 0 | 0 | 0 | 1 | 0 | 3 | 0 | 0 | 1 | 5 | 10 | 0 |
WP: Claude Osteen (1-0) LP: Clyde Wright (0-1); Home runs: AL: None; NL: Dick Dietz (1)

== Game notes and records ==
NBC's telecast of the game earned a national Nielsen rating of 28.5, the highest ever for an All-Star Game.

Claude Osteen was credited with the win. Clyde Wright was charged with the loss. Mel Stottlemyre, who permitted the tying run to score in the bottom of the ninth, was charged with a blown save.

Rico Carty became the first player in history to be elected to the All-Star team by the fans as a write-in candidate.

Twenty-three-year-old Ray Fosse suffered a fractured and separated left shoulder when Pete Rose collided with him on the last play of the game. The damage was not immediately noticed in X-rays taken that evening. While he continued playing for about a month, by his own admission, he never regained his swing and never returned to the level of play that he played at before the injury. In a 1999 San Francisco Chronicle interview, he demonstrated that he still could not lift his left arm, and suffered from arthritis as a result of the injury until his death on 13 October 2021 at age 74.

The collision opened the debate of collisions at home plate between a runner and a catcher, with prohibitions of the practice imposed at amateur levels. After Buster Posey suffered a season-ending injury during the 2011 MLB season, Major League Baseball imposed a rule prohibiting the practice in 2014.

This was the NL's eighth consecutive win. The AL would end the streak next year, but the NL began an 11-game winning streak in 1972.

Carl Yastrzemski tied the All-Star Game record for hits in a game (4), and singles in a game (3). Yastrzemski also became the second player to win the MVP award while playing for the losing team.

Prior to this year, the award given to the MVP of the game had been called the Arch Ward Memorial Award. Starting this year, the award would be called the Commissioner's Trophy (not to be confused with the Commissioner's Trophy which has been presented to the champion of the World Series since 1967). It would be restored to its original name in 1982 before being renamed for Ted Williams in 2002.
