= Ron Herbel =

American baseball player (1938–2000)

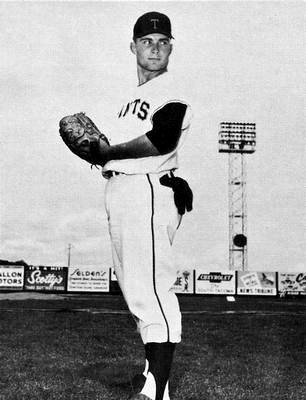
- Herbel with the Tacoma Giants, circa 1961
- Pitcher
- Born: January 16, 1938; Denver, Colorado, U.S.
- Died: January 20, 2000 (aged 62); Tacoma, Washington, U.S.
- Batted: Right Threw: Right

MLB debut
- September 10, 1963, for the San Francisco Giants

Last MLB appearance
- September 19, 1971, for the Atlanta Braves

MLB statistics
- Win–loss record: 42–37
- Earned run average: 3.83
- Strikeouts: 447
- Stats at Baseball Reference

Teams
- San Francisco Giants (1963–1969); San Diego Padres (1970); New York Mets (1970); Atlanta Braves (1971)

Ronald Samuel Herbel (January 16, 1938 – January 20, 2000) was an American Major League Baseball pitcher who appeared in 331 games, all but 79 in relief, for the San Francisco Giants, San Diego Padres, New York Mets and Atlanta Braves. A right-hander born in Denver, he was listed as 6 feet 1 inch (1.85 m) tall and 195 pounds (88 kg).

Herbel's .029 career batting average is the lowest batting average in Major League history for a player with a minimum of 100 at-bats.

Herbel set another record for batting futility: He accumulated the fewest hits of any pitcher or position player in major league history, reaching his first 100 at-bats with one. He got his second hit on June 9, 1966, at the Houston Astrodome, a fifth-inning RBI single off of Larry Dierker. He was 1-for-108 (.009) in the majors up to that point, and 0-for-12 beginning the 1966 season. It was his only safety of the season, going 1-for-38 (.026) overall. After his second MLB hit, he went 4-for-97 (.041) thereafter, completing his major league career in 1971 to finish 6-for-206.

== Biography ==
Herbel was raised in Brighton, Colorado, and graduated from Brighton High School in 1956. He attended the University of Northern Colorado. After two seasons at Northern Colorado, Herbel signed as an amateur free agent with the Giants in 1958, then spent six seasons in San Francisco's farm system when he received a September call up to the Giants in 1963. He made two relief appearances with the Giants, both against the New York Mets, with his major league debut on September 10 at the Polo Grounds.

Herbel was used both in relief and as a starter in 1964. He made 22 starts and 18 appearances out of the bullpen. His first MLB start came on May 17 in the second game of a doubleheader against the New York Mets. He allowed seven hits and no runs for a 1–0 complete game shut out. He finished the year with a 9–9 win-loss record, 3.07 earned run average and 98 strikeouts.

In his first Major League at-bat on May 6, 1964, he struck out against Larry Jackson of the Chicago Cubs. For the season, Herbel made 54 plate appearances without getting a hit, and struck out 30 times.

In 1965 Herbel earned a spot in the starting rotation on his way to a 12–9 record for a Giants team that won 14 straight games in September, with Herbel pitching the best ball of his career, only to lose the pennant by two games to a Dodgers team that won its last 15 games. He registered his first hit and RBI on May 21 in his first Major League game on Astroturf, while holding the Houston Astros to just five hits in the complete game victory. It was Herbel's only hit of the season, though he was credited with a second run batted in on July 28 when he walked with the bases loaded.

In 1967, Herbel had three hits, two of which were doubles, two walks, three successful bunts and struck out only 14 times for a .107 batting average. It was also Herbel's first real season as a reliever. Though he made 11 starts, he made 31 appearances out of the bullpen, earning one save. Over the next two seasons, Herbel made only six starts. Following the 1969 season, Herbel was traded with Bob Barton and Bobby Etheridge to the San Diego Padres for Frank Reberger.

The Padres were 50–82, 341/2 games behind the Cincinnati Reds when they dealt Herbel to the reigning World Series champion New York Mets, who were in the midst of a playoff drive again in 1970 (two games behind the first-place Pittsburgh Pirates in the National League East at the time of the trade), and needed to add an arm to their bullpen. Herbel went 2–2 with a 1.38 ERA and one save in 12 relief appearances for the Mets, who finished in third place, six games behind the Pirates. Combined with his 64 appearances with the Padres, Herbel's 76 appearances on the mound led the National League, and was only one fewer than Major League leader Wilbur Wood. Herbel was traded to the Atlanta Braves for Bob Aspromonte following the season on December 1, 1970.

Herbel spent one season in Atlanta, where he went 0–1 with a 5.23 ERA and one save in 25 appearances for the third-place Braves. He signed with the Minnesota Twins in 1972, and spent the entire season with their Triple-A Pacific Coast League affiliate before retiring. During 1964 spring training he began wearing glasses because of nearsightedness. He died from a heart attack on January 20, 2000, in Tacoma, Washington, at 62 years old.

Seasons	W	L	PCT	ERA	G	GS	CG	SHO	SV	IP	H	ER	R	HR	BB	K	WP	HBP	Fld%	Avg.	RBI
9	42	37	.532	3.83	331	79	11	3	16	8941/3	945	380	442	81	285	447	40	20	.958	.029	3
