= Gene Stack =

American baseball player

Eugene Stack (December 14, 1916 – June 26, 1942) was a pitcher in Minor League Baseball who played for the Chicago White Sox organization. He became the first player from a major league roster to be drafted during World War II and also the first to die in service.

A native of Saginaw, Michigan, Stack signed a professional contract with the Lubbock Hubbers of the West Texas–New Mexico League in 1940. He enjoyed a solid rookie season, winning 19 games and striking out 238 batters in 146.0 innings. Late in the year, Chicago White Sox manager Jimmy Dykes announced that the promising youngster had been invited to join the White Sox team in 1941 at their Pasadena, California spring training camp. But at the end of December 1940, Stack received his draft notice from the U.S. Army and was ordered to report to Fort Custer at Battle Creek, Michigan, on January 7, 1941. He served as a corporal in the United States area.

While serving, Stack became a mainstay of the Fort Custer Reception Center baseball team, with a line-up that included future Hall of Famer Hank Greenberg and minor leaguers Bob Ogle, Truman Connell and Jack Egan. The team was coached by Captain George Zegolis, a former Wayne State University player. The Fort Custer team won the national amateur championship of the American Baseball Congress on September 29, 1941 with a 3–2 victory over the Charlotte, North Carolina team. It was the last time the amateur World Series was held until after the war.

Stack continued to pitching for Camp Custer in 1942, and on June 26, the team traveled to Michigan City, Indiana for an evening game against the Michigan City Cubs. Stack allowed eight hits that night and was beaten 5–2. Returning to the camp, the team stopped at the Gingham Inn on the outskirts of Michigan City. Stack got up, put a coin in the jukebox and returned to his table. Suddenly, he slumped to the floor, after appearing to suffer a heart attack. An autopsy later revealed that Stack had actually died from pneumonia.
