= C. J. McDiarmid =

American lawyer and professional baseball executive

- McDiarmid in 1927
- Born: July 29, 1869; Barnesville, Ohio
- Died: May 13, 1942 (aged 72); Wyoming, Ohio
- Occupations: Attorney; Director of the St. Louis Browns (1907–1919); Secretary of the Cincinnati Reds (1920–1927); President of the Cincinnati Reds (1928–1929)

Campbell Johnston "C. J." McDiarmid (July 29, 1869 – May 13, 1942) was an American attorney who was the principal owner of the Cincinnati Reds of Major League Baseball.

== Biography ==
McDiarmid was born in July 1869 in Barnesville, Ohio, and spent much of his childhood in Ontario. His family then moved to Cincinnati, where he graduated from Woodward High School, the University of Cincinnati, and the University of Cincinnati College of Law. In addition to practicing law, he played semi-professional baseball as a pitcher.

McDiarmid held front-office positions in Major League Baseball, first as a director of the St. Louis Browns of the American League during 1907–1919, then as secretary of the Cincinnati Reds of the National League. After the 1927 season, McDiarmid succeeded August Herrmann as president of the Reds, presiding over the team during the 1928 and 1929 seasons. During those seasons, the Reds finished in fifth place and seventh place, respectively, in the eight-team National League. Late in the 1929 season, Sidney Weil acquired enough shares to become the controlling owner of the Reds.

McDiarmid died in Wyoming, Ohio, in May 1942; he was survived by his wife, three daughters, and two sons. He is buried in Cincinnati's Spring Grove Cemetery.
