= Murray Gillispie =

Professional baseball player

- Pitcher
- Born: 1908; Oklahoma City, Oklahoma, U.S.
- Died: February 26, 1942 (aged 33–34); Oakville, Tennessee, U.S.
- Batted: Unknown Threw: Left

Negro league baseball debut
- 1930, for the Chicago American Giants

Last appearance
- 1932, for the Monroe Monarchs
- Stats at Baseball Reference

Teams
- Chicago American Giants (1930); Memphis Red Sox (1930, 1932); Monroe Monarchs (1932)

Murray "Red" Gillispie (1908 – February 26, 1942) was an American professional baseball pitcher in the Negro leagues. He played with the Chicago American Giants, Memphis Red Sox, and Monroe Monarchs from 1930 to 1932.
