= Mike Davison (baseball) =

American baseball player (1945-2013)

- Pitcher
- Born: August 4, 1945; Galesburg, Illinois, U.S.
- Died: May 11, 2013 (aged 67); Glencoe, Minnesota, U.S.
- Batted: Left Threw: Left

MLB debut
- October 1, 1969, for the San Francisco Giants

Last MLB appearance
- October 1, 1970, for the San Francisco Giants

MLB statistics
- Win–loss record: 3–5
- Earned run average: 6.39
- Innings pitched: 38
- Stats at Baseball Reference

Teams
- San Francisco Giants (1969–1970)

Michael Lynn Davison (August 4, 1945 – May 11, 2013) was an American professional baseball player. Davison was a left-handed pitcher whose career (1964–1965; 1969–1971) was interrupted by three years of service in the army 1969–1972. He appeared in 32 games over two seasons (1969–1970) for the San Francisco Giants of Major League Baseball.

Davison was born in Galesburg, Illinois. He stood 6 feet 1 inch (1.85 m) tall and weighed 170 pounds (77 kg). He graduated from Springfield High School in Springfield, Minnesota in 1963 and attended Augsburg College before signing his first pro contract with the Baltimore Orioles in 1964. Drafted out of the Oriole system by the Giants that winter, he played for one season with the 1965 Springfield Giants of the Double-A Eastern League, then entered military service. When he resumed his career, in 1969, he converted from a starting pitcher to a reliever. Called up by the Giants at the end of the season, he pitched in one game for them in 1969, then in 31 more from June 5, 1970, through the end of the season — all in relief.

Overall, Davison allowed 48 hits and 22 bases on balls in 38 MLB innings pitched, with 23 strikeouts, three victories and one save.

After retiring, Davison was active as a member of the Major League Baseball Players Alumni Association.

== Death ==
Davison died on May 11, 2013, at Glencoe Regional Health Services Long Term Care in Glencoe, Minnesota. He was 67 years old.
