= Charlie Jaeger =

American baseball player (1875–1942)

- Pitcher
- Born: April 17, 1875; Ottawa, Illinois, U.S.
- Died: September 27, 1942 (aged 67); Ottawa, Illinois, U.S.
- Batted: Right Threw: Right

MLB debut
- September 9, 1904, for the Detroit Tigers

Last MLB appearance
- October 7, 1904, for the Detroit Tigers

MLB statistics
- Win–loss record: 3-3
- Earned run average: 2.57
- Strikeouts: 13
- Stats at Baseball Reference

Teams
- Detroit Tigers (1904)

Charles Thomas Jaeger (April 17, 1875 – September 27, 1942) was an American pitcher in Major League Baseball who played for the Detroit Tigers during the 1904 Detroit Tigers season.
