= John Harrell =

American baseball player (born 1947)

- Catcher
- Born: November 27, 1947 (age 78); Long Beach, California, U.S.
- Batted: Right Threw: Right

MLB debut
- October 1, 1969, for the San Francisco Giants

Last MLB appearance
- October 2, 1969, for the San Francisco Giants

MLB statistics
- Games played: 2
- At bats: 6
- Hits: 3
- Stats at Baseball Reference

Teams
- San Francisco Giants (1969)

John Robert Harrell (born November 27, 1947) is an American former catcher in Major League Baseball. He played for the San Francisco Giants in 1969.
