= Jimpsey Roussell =

American baseball player

- Outfielder
- Born: September 20, 1900; New Orleans, Louisiana, U.S.
- Died: October 25, 1942 (aged 42); New Orleans, Louisiana, U.S.

Negro league baseball debut
- 1929, for the Birmingham Black Barons

Last appearance
- 1930, for the Memphis Red Sox

Teams
- Birmingham Black Barons (1929); Memphis Red Sox (1930)

Edward Lorenzo "Jimpsey" Roussell (September 20, 1900 – October 25, 1942), nicknamed "Jimsey" or "Jimpsey", was an American Negro league baseball outfielder from 1929 to 1931.

A native of New Orleans, Louisiana, Roussell made his Negro leagues debut in 1929 with the Birmingham Black Barons. He went on to play for the Memphis Red Sox the following season.
