= Bobby Etheridge (baseball) =

American baseball player (1941-2015)

- Third baseman
- Born: November 25, 1941; Greenville, Mississippi, U.S.
- Died: September 17, 2015 (aged 73); Rolling Fork, Mississippi, U.S.
- Batted: Right Threw: Right

MLB debut
- July 16, 1967, for the San Francisco Giants

Last MLB appearance
- October 2, 1969, for the San Francisco Giants

MLB statistics
- Batting average: .244
- Home runs: 2
- Runs batted in: 25
- Stats at Baseball Reference

Teams
- San Francisco Giants (1967, 1969)

Career highlights and awards
- Topps All-Star Rookie Teams (1967)

Bobby Lamar Etheridge (November 25, 1941 – September 17, 2015) was an American professional baseball third baseman, who played parts of two seasons in Major League Baseball (MLB) for the San Francisco Giants.

Etheridge played college baseball at Mississippi State University for two seasons before signing with the San Francisco Giants as an amateur free agent in 1964. After three seasons in the Giants' farm system, he made his major league debut on July 16, 1967 in the first game of a doubleheader against the Chicago Cubs at Candlestick Park. Etheridge entered the game as a late inning defensive replacement. The next day, he made his first major league start; with the Giants down 4-1 in the ninth inning, Etheridge hit a two out triple to drive in Bob Schroder and Jim Davenport. With Etheridge representing the tying run at third base, the following batter, Willie McCovey, grounded out to end the game.

For the season, Etheridge batted .226 with one home run and fifteen runs batted in (RBI) for the second place Giants. Though he struggled for playing time behind slugger Jim Ray Hart at third base, Etheridge was named a rookie All-Star by Topps.

Etheridge spent all of 1968 with the Pacific Coast League Phoenix Giants, but was back with San Francisco for opening day of the 1969 season. At the end of the season, he was traded to the San Diego Padres with Bob Barton and Ron Herbel for Frank Reberger. After half a season with the Salt Lake City Bees, he was dealt from the Padres to the St. Louis Cardinals for Ron Willis before the trade deadline on June 15, 1970. He spent the rest of the 1970 season and all of the 1971 season with the Tulsa Oilers. While 1971 was his best season statistically since 1966, Etheridge never reached the major leagues with the Cardinals. He spent 1972 and 1973 in the New York Mets' farm system, before retiring.
