= Diamond Pipkins =

American baseball player (1907–1975)

- Pitcher
- Born: August 17, 1907; Adams County, Mississippi, U.S.
- Died: March 17, 1975 (aged 67); New Orleans, Louisiana, U.S.
- Batted: Left Threw: Left

Negro league baseball debut
- 1929, for the Birmingham Black Barons

Last appearance
- 1942, for the Birmingham Black Barons

Teams
- Birmingham Black Barons (1929); Cleveland Cubs (1931); Birmingham Black Barons (1942)

Robert Manuel Pipkins (August 17, 1907 – March 17, 1975), alternately spelled "Pipkin", and nicknamed "Diamond" or "Black Diamond", was an American Negro league pitcher between 1929 and 1942.

A native of Adams County, Mississippi, Pipkins made his Negro leagues debut in 1929 for the Birmingham Black Barons. He went on to play for the Cleveland Cubs in 1931, and finished his career back with Birmingham in 1942. Pipkins died in New Orleans, Louisiana in 1975 at age 67.
