= Bob Burda =

American baseball player (born 1938)

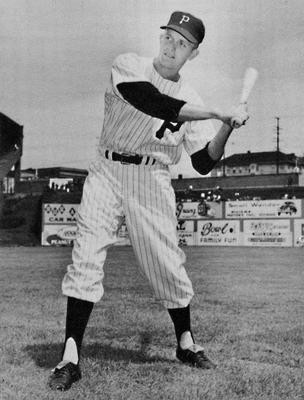
- First baseman / Outfielder
- Born: July 16, 1938 (age 88); St. Louis, Missouri, U.S.
- Batted: Left Threw: Left

MLB debut
- August 25, 1962, for the St. Louis Cardinals

Last MLB appearance
- August 23, 1972, for the Boston Red Sox

MLB statistics
- Batting average: .224
- Home runs: 13
- Runs batted in: 78
- Stats at Baseball Reference

Teams
- St. Louis Cardinals (1962); San Francisco Giants (1965–1966, 1969–1970); Milwaukee Brewers (1970); St. Louis Cardinals (1971); Boston Red Sox (1972)

Edward Robert Burda (born July 16, 1938) is an American former professional baseball player. The first baseman and right fielder appeared in 388 games in Major League Baseball (MLB) for the St. Louis Cardinals (1962, 1971), San Francisco Giants (1965–1966, 1969–1970), Milwaukee Brewers (1970) and Boston Red Sox (1972). He batted and threw left-handed, stood 5 feet 11 inches (1.80 m) tall, and weighed 174 pounds (79 kg) during his active career.

Born in St. Louis, Missouri, Burda graduated from Ritenour High School and attended Southern Illinois University and the University of Illinois at Urbana–Champaign. He spent 15 seasons (1958–1972) in professional baseball after signing with his original organization, the Cardinals. Of his seven big-league seasons, the last four were spent exclusively at the MLB level.

As a major leaguer, Burda collected 142 career hits, including 21 doubles and 13 home runs. He batted .224 with 78 RBI.

== Best season ==
- 1971 with the Cardinals: Hit .296 and led National League with 14 pinch-hits
