= Chuck Nieson =

American baseball player (1942–2026)

- Pitcher
- Born: September 24, 1942; Hanford, California, U.S.
- Died: April 7, 2026 (aged 83)
- Batted: Right Threw: Right

MLB debut
- September 18, 1964, for the Minnesota Twins

Last MLB appearance
- September 19, 1964, for the Minnesota Twins

MLB statistics
- Win–loss record: 0–0
- Earned run average: 4.50
- Strikeouts: 5
- Stats at Baseball Reference

Teams
- Minnesota Twins (1964)

Charles Bassett Nieson (September 24, 1942 – April 7, 2026) was an American Major League Baseball pitcher who appeared in two games for the Minnesota Twins in 1964.

== Biography ==
Nieson was born in Hanford, California, on September 24, 1942. He threw and batted right-handed, was 6 ft 2 in (1.88 m) in height, and 185 pounds (84 kg) in weight. He attended Fresno State University.

On September 18, 1964, he made his big league debut at the age of 21. He wore number 29. The next day, he played his final game. In the two games he played, he pitched in a total of two innings. He struck out 5, walked one, and gave up one hit, a home run to Frank Malzone of the Boston Red Sox. With 5 strikeouts in 8 batters faced, he struck out 62.5% of the batters he faced—which is the all-time career best for any MLB pitcher with 2 or more batters faced.

Nieson died on April 7, 2026, at the age of 83.
