= Jack Hiatt =

American baseball player (born 1942)

- Catcher
- Born: July 27, 1942 (age 84); Bakersfield, California, U.S.
- Batted: Right Threw: Right

MLB debut
- September 7, 1964, for the Los Angeles Angels

Last MLB appearance
- October 3, 1972, for the California Angels

MLB statistics
- Batting average: .251
- Home runs: 22
- Runs batted in: 154
- Stats at Baseball Reference

Teams
- Los Angeles Angels (1964); San Francisco Giants (1965–1969); Montreal Expos (1970); Chicago Cubs (1970); Houston Astros (1971–1972); California Angels (1972)

Jack E. Hiatt (born July 27, 1942) is an American former professional baseball player and minor league manager. He played in Major League Baseball as a catcher from 1964 to 1972, most prominently as a member of the San Francisco Giants. After his playing career, he managed in the minor leagues before serving as the Giants' director of player development.

== Playing career ==
Hiatt graduated from San Fernando High School and then attended Los Angeles Pierce College. He was signed as an undrafted free agent by the Los Angeles Angels in 1961. He was signed by the Los Angeles Angels as a free agent in 1961. Hiatt made his debut on September 7, 1964 at the age of 22. He played the catcher position for 312 games, but was also called upon to play first base for 70 games and went into the outfield for 2.

At the beginning of the 1969 San Francisco Giants season, the starting catcher job was won by Dick Dietz. However, when a foul tip bruised his right hand, Hiatt took over the role as starter and made an almost immediate impact. In his first six games after taking over the starting role, Hiatt had four home runs and 13 runs batted in. Hiatt was quoted as saying during the stretch, "It really makes a difference when you know you're going to play again every day. It used to be that if I didn't have a good game, I wouldn't be in the lineup the next game unless somebody was hurt." He gave credit to his hitting coach, Hank Sauer, for the remarkable stretch. Hiatt noted that all of his home runs came on outside corner fastballs. "It's a pitch I'd been taking until Sauer suggested that I swing at it."

On April 24, Hiatt hit his first home run of the season off Atlanta Braves pitcher Milt Pappas, an opposite field 360-foot shot that also drove in Willie McCovey. The next day, April 25, Hiatt had a mammoth performance against the Houston Astros, hitting two home runs and driving in seven runs. In the first inning, Hiatt homered off Astros starter Denny Lemaster to drive in teammate Willie Mays. In the eighth inning, he roped a single to left to score Bobby Bonds from third base. In the bottom of the 13th inning, Hiatt dramatically hit a walk-off grand slam off Astros pitcher Dan Schneider to end the game.

Hiatt received praise from Giants manager Clyde King in regards to his defensive efforts. "We had a game in Cincinnati where Hiatt made six tremendous stops of pitches in the dirt." He added, "He kept us in the game all night."

Despite the hot start, Hiatt's offensive production faded and he finished the season with a .196 batting average. He played in his final major league game with the Angels on October 3, 1972 at the age of 30.

== Minor league career ==
Hiatt played in 744 games over the course of nine seasons in the minor leagues. He batted .299, hit 61 home runs and had 275 RBIs in 2288 at-bats. Hiatt's best season was in 1964 with Hawaii of the PCL where he had a .308 batting average, 23 home runs, 83 RBIs, and a .557 slugging average in 406 at-bats.

== Post-career ==
After his playing career, Hiatt managed minor league teams for the Chicago Cubs organization, including the GCL Cubs (1975), the Pompano Beach Cubs (1976–1978), and the Wichita Aeros (1979–1980). Under the California Angels farm system he managed the Holyoke Millers in 1982. With the Houston Astros, he managed the Columbus Astros in 1983. The final managerial position he took in the minors was with the San Francisco Giants farm team, the Pocatello Giants in 1988. Over the course of his minor league managerial career Hiatt amassed a 501–599 record with only three winning seasons.

Hiatt was the Giants' director of player development for 16 seasons, before his retirement in October 2007.
