= Frank Johnson (1960s outfielder) =

American baseball player (1942–2025)

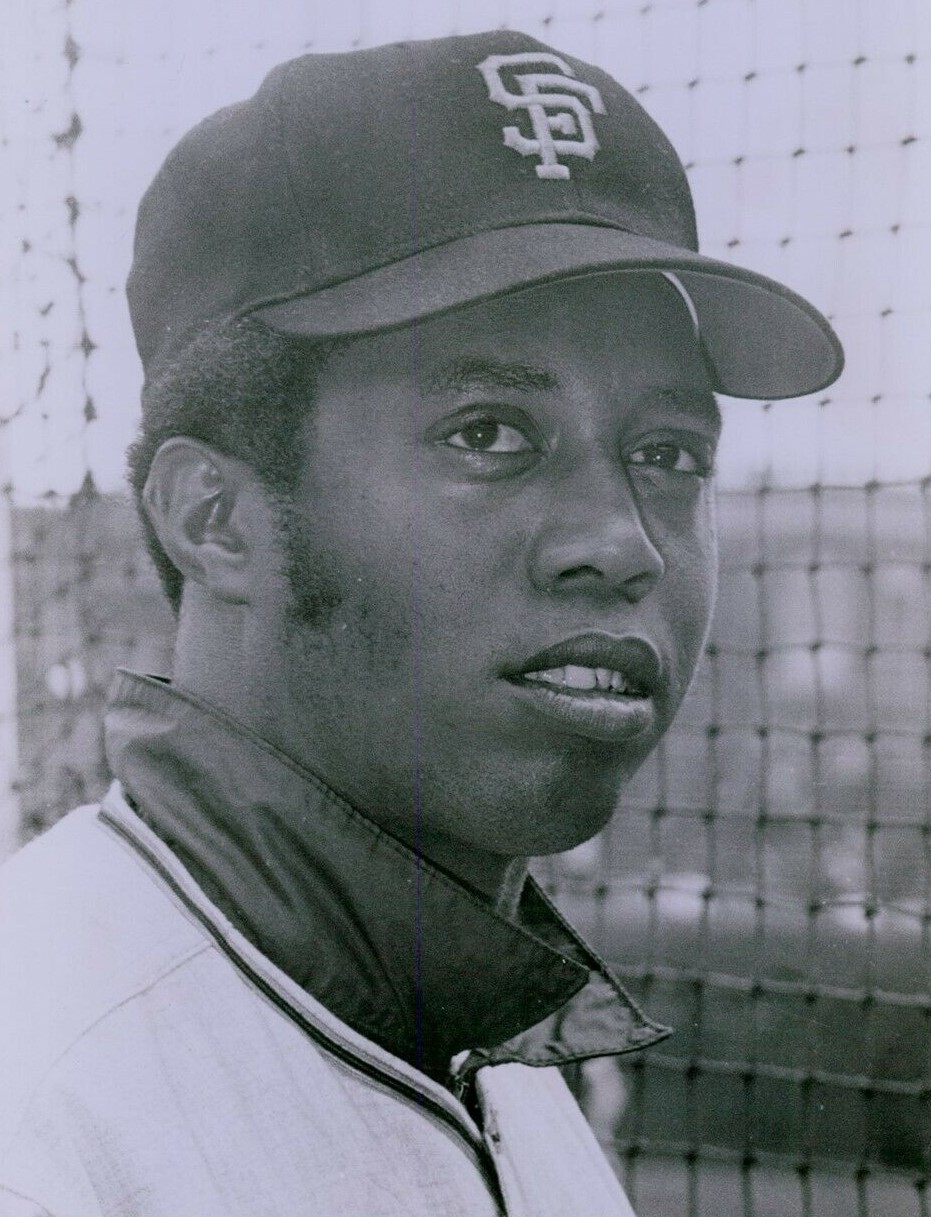
- Johnson in 1971
- Outfielder / Third baseman / First baseman
- Born: July 22, 1942; El Paso, Texas, U.S.
- Died: May 7, 2025 (aged 82); Stockton, California, U.S.
- Batted: Right Threw: Right

MLB debut
- September 7, 1966, for the San Francisco Giants

Last MLB appearance
- June 12, 1971, for the San Francisco Giants

MLB statistics
- Batting average: .211
- Home runs: 4
- Runs batted in: 43
- Stats at Baseball Reference

Teams
- San Francisco Giants (1966–1971); Lotte Orions (1972)

Frank Herbert Johnson (July 22, 1942 – May 7, 2025) was an American professional baseball player. Primarily an outfielder and third baseman, he had a five-season career that included one full season (1968) and parts of five others (1966–1967; 1969–1971) with the San Francisco Giants of Major League Baseball. He threw and batted right-handed, stood 6 feet 1 inch (1.85 m) tall and weighed 155 pounds (70 kg) during his active career.

== Pro career ==
Johnson batted over .290 in four of his first seven seasons in minor league baseball, and had late-season trials with the Giants in both 1966 and 1967. He got into 67 games played with the 1968 Giants, but batted only .190 in 174 at bats during "The Year of the Pitcher." His best pro season came in 1970 when he batted .353 in the Pacific Coast League, then spent another 67 games with the MLB Giants, where he registered a career-high .273 batting average, 44 hits, three home runs and 31 runs batted in as a backup left fielder and first baseman. His MLB career coincided with the final years of the Willie Mays era, when the Giants also featured such young outfielders as Jesús Alou, Bobby Bonds, Ollie Brown, George Foster, Jim Ray Hart, and Ken Henderson. Johnson grew to be prized for his versatility. Over his Major League career he played every defensive position besides pitcher and catcher.

Johnson collected 92 Major League hits in 196 games and 436 at bats. His playing career ended after the 1975 campaign.

== Personal life and death ==
Johnson was inducted into the El Paso Baseball Hall of Fame in 1991.

Johnson died in Stockton, California on May 7, 2025, at the age of 82.
