= Bob Barton =

American baseball player (1941–2018)

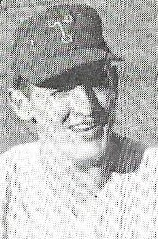
- Catcher
- Born: July 30, 1941; Norwood, Ohio, U.S.
- Died: January 15, 2018 (aged 76); Vista, California, U.S.
- Batted: Right Threw: Right

MLB debut
- September 17, 1965, for the San Francisco Giants

Last MLB appearance
- July 30, 1974, for the San Diego Padres

MLB statistics
- Batting average: .226
- Home runs: 9
- Runs batted in: 66
- Stats at Baseball Reference

Teams
- San Francisco Giants (1965–1969); San Diego Padres (1970–1972); Cincinnati Reds (1973); San Diego Padres (1974)

Robert Wilbur Barton (July 30, 1941 – January 15, 2018) was an American professional baseball player. He played in Major League Baseball as a catcher from 1965 to 1974 for the San Francisco Giants, San Diego Padres and the Cincinnati Reds.

Barton made his Major League debut at the age of 22 on September 17, 1965, in a 9–1 Giants loss to the Milwaukee Braves at County Stadium, entering the game in the seventh inning, replacing catcher Jack Hiatt. He batted once, going 0–1 with a foulout. His first hit came in his next at-bat on September 28 in a 9–1 loss to the St. Louis Cardinals at San Francisco's Candlestick Park. Pinch-hitting for Baseball Hall of Famer Warren Spahn in the ninth inning, he singled off Larry Jaster.

Barton was primarily a backup catcher, playing behind Tom Haller with the Giants and Baseball Hall of Famer Johnny Bench with the Reds. His best statistical year as a hitter was as a starter for the 1971 Padres; in 121 games, he hit .250 with five home runs and 23 runs batted in along with 17 doubles. On defense, in 1971 he led National League catchers in runners caught stealing (42), percentage of runners caught stealing (51.2%) and errors committed (15) and was second in assists (67).
