= 1970 in baseball =

The following are the baseball events of the year 1970 throughout the world.

== Champions ==
=== Major Leagues ===
League Championship Series NBC
East	Baltimore Orioles	3
West	Minnesota Twins	0
East	Pittsburgh Pirates	0
West	Cincinnati Reds	3

World Series NBC
AL	Baltimore Orioles	4
NL	Cincinnati Reds	1

- World Series: Baltimore Orioles over Cincinnati Reds (4–1); Brooks Robinson, MVP
- All-Star Game, July 14 at Riverfront Stadium: National League, 5–4 (12 innings); Carl Yastrzemski, MVP

=== Other champions ===
- College World Series: USC
- Japan Series: Yomiuri Giants over Lotte Orions (4–1)
- Big League World Series: Lincolnwood, Illinois
- Little League World Series: American, Wayne, New Jersey
- Senior League World Series: West Tampa, Florida

Winter Leagues

- 1970 Caribbean Series: Navegantes del Magallanes
- Dominican Republic League: Tigres del Licey
- Mexican Pacific League: Tomateros de Culiacán
- Puerto Rican League: Leones de Ponce
- Venezuelan League: Navegantes del Magallanes

== Awards and honors ==
- Baseball Hall of Fame
  - Lou Boudreau
  - Earle Combs
  - Jesse Haines
  - Ford Frick (executive)

Baseball Writers' Association of America Awards
BBWAA Award	National League	American League
Rookie of the Year	Carl Morton (MON)	Thurman Munson (NYY)
Cy Young Award	Bob Gibson (STL)	Jim Perry (MIN)
Most Valuable Player	Johnny Bench (CIN)	Boog Powell (BAL)
Gold Glove Awards
Position	National League	American League
Pitcher	Bob Gibson (STL)	Jim Kaat (MIN)
Catcher	Johnny Bench (CIN)	Ray Fosse (CLE)
1st Base	Wes Parker (LAD)	Jim Spencer (CAL)
2nd Base	Tommy Helms (CIN)	Davey Johnson (BAL)
3rd Base	Doug Rader (HOU)	Brooks Robinson (BAL)
Shortstop	Don Kessinger (CHC)	Luis Aparicio (CWS)
Outfield	Tommie Agee (NYM)	Ken Berry (CWS)
Outfield	Roberto Clemente (PIT)	Paul Blair (BAL)
Outfield	Pete Rose (CIN)	Mickey Stanley (DET)

== Statistical leaders ==
	American League		National League	
Stat	Player	Total	Player	Total
AVG	Alex Johnson (CAL)	.329	Rico Carty (ATL)	.366
HR	Frank Howard (WAS)	44	Johnny Bench (CIN)	45
RBI	Frank Howard (WAS)	126	Johnny Bench (CIN)	148
W	Mike Cuellar (BAL); Dave McNally (BAL); Jim Perry (MIN)	24	Bob Gibson (STL); Gaylord Perry (SF)	23
ERA	Diego Seguí (OAK)	2.56	Tom Seaver (NYM)	2.82
K	Sam McDowell (CLE)	304	Tom Seaver (NYM)	283

== Major league baseball final standings ==
=== American League final standings ===
AL East
Team	W	L	Pct.	GB	Home	Road
^{(1)} Baltimore Orioles	108	54	.667	—	59‍–‍22	49‍–‍32
New York Yankees	93	69	.574	15	53‍–‍28	40‍–‍41
Boston Red Sox	87	75	.537	21	52‍–‍29	35‍–‍46
Detroit Tigers	79	83	.488	29	42‍–‍39	37‍–‍44
Cleveland Indians	76	86	.469	32	43‍–‍38	33‍–‍48
Washington Senators	70	92	.432	38	40‍–‍41	30‍–‍51

AL West
Team	W	L	Pct.	GB	Home	Road
^{(2)} Minnesota Twins	98	64	.605	—	51‍–‍30	47‍–‍34
Oakland Athletics	89	73	.549	9	49‍–‍32	40‍–‍41
California Angels	86	76	.531	12	43‍–‍38	43‍–‍38
Kansas City Royals	65	97	.401	33	35‍–‍44	30‍–‍53
Milwaukee Brewers	65	97	.401	33	38‍–‍42	27‍–‍55
Chicago White Sox	56	106	.346	42	31‍–‍53	25‍–‍53

Locations of teams for the 1970–1971 American League seasons
West East

=== National League final standings ===
NL East
Team	W	L	Pct.	GB	Home	Road
^{(2)} Pittsburgh Pirates	89	73	.549	—	50‍–‍32	39‍–‍41
Chicago Cubs	84	78	.519	5	46‍–‍34	38‍–‍44
New York Mets	83	79	.512	6	44‍–‍38	39‍–‍41
St. Louis Cardinals	76	86	.469	13	34‍–‍47	42‍–‍39
Philadelphia Phillies	73	88	.453	15½	40‍–‍40	33‍–‍48
Montreal Expos	73	89	.451	16	39‍–‍41	34‍–‍48

NL West
Team	W	L	Pct.	GB	Home	Road
^{(1)} Cincinnati Reds	102	60	.630	—	57‍–‍24	45‍–‍36
Los Angeles Dodgers	87	74	.540	14½	39‍–‍42	48‍–‍32
San Francisco Giants	86	76	.531	16	48‍–‍33	38‍–‍43
Houston Astros	79	83	.488	23	44‍–‍37	35‍–‍46
Atlanta Braves	76	86	.469	26	42‍–‍39	34‍–‍47
San Diego Padres	63	99	.389	39	31‍–‍50	32‍–‍49

Locations of teams for the 1970 National League season
West East

== Nippon Professional Baseball final standings ==
=== Central League final standings ===
Central League
Team	G	W	L	T	Pct.	GB
Yomiuri Giants	130	79	47	4	.627	—
Hanshin Tigers	130	77	49	4	.611	2.0
Taiyo Whales	130	69	57	4	.548	10.0
Hiroshima Toyo Carp	130	62	60	8	.508	15.0
Chunichi Dragons	130	55	70	5	.440	23.5
Yakult Atoms	130	33	92	5	.264	45.5

=== Pacific League final standings ===
Pacific League
Team	G	W	L	T	Pct.	GB
Lotte Orions	130	80	47	3	.630	—
Nankai Hawks	130	69	57	4	.548	10.5
Kintetsu Buffaloes	130	65	59	6	.524	13.5
Hankyu Braves	130	64	64	2	.500	16.5
Toei Flyers	130	54	70	6	.435	24.5
Nishitetsu Lions	130	43	78	9	.355	34.0

== Events ==
=== January ===
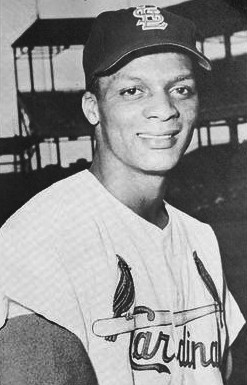
Curt Flood

- January 14 – The California Angels acquire veteran pitcher Jack Fisher from the Cincinnati Reds for pitcher Bill Harrelson and minor-league infielder Daniel Loomer.
- January 15 – The Seattle Pilots (soon to be the Milwaukee Brewers) trade first baseman Don Mincher and third baseman Ron Clark to the Oakland Athletics for pitchers Lew Krausse Jr. and Ken Sanders, catcher Phil Roof and outfielder Mike Hershberger.
- January 16 – Curt Flood, Gold Glove former centerfielder of the St. Louis Cardinals, files a civil lawsuit challenging Major League Baseball's reserve clause, a suit that will have historic implications. Flood will refuse to report to the Philadelphia Phillies after he was traded by the Cardinals three months ago, contending the baseball rule violates federal antitrust laws.
- January 17:
  - The Sporting News names Willie Mays as Player of the Decade for the 1960s.
  - The January 1970 Major League Baseball draft sees future stars Chris Chambliss (Cleveland Indians), Chris Speier (San Francisco Giants), Rick Burleson (Boston Red Sox), Doug DeCinces (Baltimore Orioles) and Bill Madlock (Washington Senators) drafted and signed by MLB teams.
- January 19 – The New York Mets appoint former MLB catcher and field manager Bob Scheffing as vice president and general manager, filling the void left by the January 14 death of Johnny Murphy. Scheffing, 56, previously was a senior special assignments scout for the Mets' organization.
- January 20 – Lou Boudreau is elected to the Hall of Fame by the Baseball Writers' Association of America on 232 of 300 ballots. Ralph Kiner finishes second with 167, 58 votes short.
- January 29 – Pitcher Miguel Fuentes, who threw the last pitch for the Seattle Pilots, is shot to death outside of a bar in Loiza, Puerto Rico.

=== February ===
- February 1 – The Hall of Fame Special Committee on Veterans selects former commissioner Ford Frick and former players Earle Combs and Jesse Haines for enshrinement.
- February 4 – The Cincinnati Reds acquire southpaw hurler Bo Belinsky from the Pittsburgh Pirates for right-hander Dennis Ribant. Known as a free-wheeling bachelor in his earlier days with the Los Angeles Angels, Belinsky, 33, appears in three early-season games, the last of his MLB career, for the buttoned-up "Big Red Machine" before he's sent to Triple-A.
- February 18 – The Cleveland Indians acquire left-handed relief specialist Steve Mingori from the Reds for infielder Jay Ward.
- February 19 – Commissioner Bowie Kuhn announces the suspension of Detroit Tigers pitcher Denny McLain, effective April 1, for McLain's alleged involvement in a bookmaking operation. The suspension is indefinite, but will later be set at three months.

=== March ===
- March 8 – With the Seattle Pilots' parent company, Pacific Northwest Sports, in bankruptcy court and the club's sale to a Milwaukee consortium headed by Bud Selig the only viable path forward, American League owners begin to weigh transferring the year-old team. The AL magnates are wary of angering the State of Washington's two powerful U.S. Senators, Scoop Jackson and Warren Magnuson, and endangering MLB's anti-trust exemption.
- March 17 – After almost two decades as president of the Brooklyn/Los Angeles Dodgers franchise, Walter O'Malley names his son, Peter, 32, to succeed him in the post. The elder O'Malley, who owns 75 percent of the Dodgers' stock, becomes chairman of the board.
- March 18 – The St. Louis Cardinals reveal that veteran third baseman Mike Shannon is suffering from a life-threatening ailment, a form of glomerulonephritis, in both kidneys. Hospitalized for nearly a month, Shannon, 30, is able to return to action May 14 and play 55 games for the Redbirds before the illness forces him back to the injured list in August, followed by his off-season retirement. He immediately joins the Cardinals' broadcast team, where he spends all or part of 50 years before stepping down in 2021 during the COVID-19 pandemic.
- March 21 – The Washington Senators trade outfielder Brant Alyea to the Minnesota Twins for pitchers Joe Grzenda and Charley Walters. Alyea, a reserve with Washington, will bat .415 for the Twins during the month of April with five home runs and 23 RBI in 17 games. Walters never pitches for the Senators, but when he retires from baseball he'll get a journalism degree and become a featured sports columnist for the St. Paul Pioneer Press.
- March 29 – The New York Mets deal veteran catcher J. C. Martin, an unsung contributor to their 1969 National League Championship Series and World Series triumphs, to the Chicago Cubs for catcher Randy Bobb.
- March 30 – The current edition of the Washington Senators signs free-agent, veteran right-handed pitcher Pedro Ramos, 34. Ramos returns to D.C., where he was a starting pitcher for the 1901–1960 Senators (now the Minnesota Twins) and known for his blazing fastball and prodigious games-lost totals: Ramos led the American League in that dubious category for four straight years (including one season in Minnesota), and between 1957 and 1961 he put up consecutive years of 16, 18, 19, 18 and 20 defeats.

=== April ===
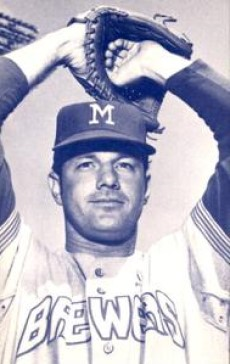
John Morris of the 1970 Brewers poses (without baseball) in the team's uniform that still shows vestiges (the ship captain's striped sleeves) of its Seattle heritage

- April 1:
  - The Milwaukee Brewers' parent company, headed by Bud Selig, purchases the Seattle Pilots franchise for $10.8 million. Although negotiations were conducted over a period of months, it was not until yesterday, March 31, when a federal bankruptcy judge declared the Pilots bankrupt; Brewers' tickets will go on sale tomorrow. Team equipment is shipped to Milwaukee County Stadium, where the Pilots' insignia is ripped off the uniforms and replaced by "Brewers," since there is no time for new ones to be made. The franchise remains in the American League West.
  - On their first day as Milwaukee's team, the Brewers release left-hander Steve Barber. The former 20-game-winner, 32, will sign as a free agent April 23 with the Chicago Cubs.
- April 4 – The Milwaukee Brewers make another deal, sending infielder Frank Coggins, outfielder Roy Foster and cash to the Cleveland Indians for third baseman Max Alvis and outfielder Russ Snyder. Foster, 24, will bash 23 homers for the 1970 Tribe and finish second in the voting for American League Rookie of the Year.
- April 6:
  - In the National League's 95th Opening Day, the Cincinnati Reds defeat the Montreal Expos 5–1 behind Jim Merritt's three-hitter and three home runs. It's the last opener at ancient Crosley Field, and the unofficial start of Cincinnati's Big Red Machine era that will produce five division titles, four NL pennants and two World Series championships over the next seven years.
  - The American League's traditional Presidential Opener is delayed 55 minutes by rain, and Richard Nixon arrives in the middle of the first inning—missing his opportunity to throw out the first ball—as the Detroit Tigers' Mickey Lolich shuts out the Washington Senators 5–0.
- April 7:
  - Milwaukee regains a Major League Baseball franchise of its own after a four-year absence as the Brewers play their first game, losing to the California Angels 12–0 before a crowd of 37,237 at County Stadium. The Wisconsin city had hosted 20 American League games played by the "homestanding" Chicago White Sox in 1968–1969.
  - Pitcher Dave McNally strikes out 13 in nine innings as the Baltimore Orioles rip the Indians, 8–2, in Opening Day at Cleveland Stadium. The attack is led by Paul Blair, who drives in a pair of runs and scores three times. McNally holds the Indians to two runs on four hits and three walks to get the win. Rookie Roy Foster belts a two-run home run for the only offense for Cleveland.
  - In Minnesota, left-fielder Brant Alyea leads the Twins over the Chicago White Sox, 12–0. His 4-for-4 day includes two homers and seven RBI, the latter setting a major league Opening Day record.
- April 8 – The Detroit Tigers release outfielder Tom Tresh. Tresh, 31, the American League Rookie of the Year in 1962, never plays in the majors again.
- April 11 – At Comiskey Park, Danny Walton hits the first two home runs in Milwaukee Brewers history, both two-run shots coming against White Sox starter Billy Wynne. The Brewers win for the first time, 8–4.
- April 18 – Nolan Ryan gives up only one hit in the first inning as he sets a then-New York Mets record by striking out 15 batters in a 7–0 victory over the Philadelphia Phillies at Shea Stadium.
- April 21 – At "The Launching Pad," Atlanta–Fulton County Stadium, the fast-starting Cincinnati Reds bash seven home runs, two by rookie Bernie Carbo, to defeat the Atlanta Braves 13–8.
- April 22:
  - Four days after Ryan's strikeout feat, the New York Mets' Tom Seaver whiffs 19 San Diego Padres, including the last ten in succession, in winning 2–1. San Diego's Mike Corkins takes the loss. In the 20th century, no one had ever struck out ten batters in a row, a modern major league record. The Pads now have fanned 29 times in two games, a National League mark that will be topped in 1998 when the Houston Astro batters rack up 31 Ks in two days. Jerry Grote adds one foul fly catch to his 19 putouts via K's.
  - At RFK Stadium, the Washington Senators go 18 innings to defeat the New York Yankees 2–1. Mike Epstein's sacrifice fly plates the game-winning run.
- April 24 – Tom Haller's RBI single drives in the game's only run in the home half of the 15th, as the Los Angeles Dodgers thwart the New York Mets 1–0. It's the longest of the Mets' 21 extra-inning games of 1970.
- April 27 – The California Angels trade third baseman Aurelio Rodríguez, 22, and outfielder Rick Reichardt, 27, to the Washington Senators for veteran third baseman Ken McMullen.
- April 29 – The Baltimore Orioles' Paul Blair, known for his brilliant defense in center field, slugs three home runs and drives in six in an 18–2 thrashing of the Chicago White Sox at Comiskey Park.

=== May ===
- May 2:
  - The Philadelphia Phillies' two top catchers, starter Tim McCarver and backup Mike Ryan, suffer broken fingers in the sixth inning against the San Francisco Giants at Candlestick Park. McCarver breaks a finger on his throwing hand when it's struck by a Willie Mays foul tip and is forced to leave the game. Ryan takes his place, and three batters later, Willie McCovey's slide into home breaks a finger on his gloved hand. Utilityman Jim Hutto takes over for Ryan. McCarver is out of action for four full months and appears in only 44 games in 1970. Ryan misses two full months. The Phillies will use six catchers during the season, including bullpen coach Doc Edwards.
  - A 17-inning marathon at Municipal Stadium sees the Kansas City Royals edge the Cleveland Indians 4–3.
- May 10 – Hoyt Wilhelm of the Atlanta Braves makes his 1,000th MLB pitching appearance—the first pitcher in history to do so. The 47-year-old knuckleball artist, headed for the Baseball Hall of Fame, is in his 19th big-league season.
- May 11 – The California Angels and visiting Boston Red Sox go 16 innings to settle matters, with the Angels prevailing 2–1. Jarvis Tatum, who doubled, scores the winning run on a hit by Sandy Alomar Sr.
- May 12 – At Wrigley Field, Ernie Banks becomes the eighth member of the 500 home run club, connecting off Atlanta Braves pitcher Pat Jarvis during a 4–3, 11-inning Chicago Cubs win. It's also his 1,600th career run batted in. Ex-Cub Frank Secory is umpiring this game, as he was on September 20, 1953, when Banks hit his first career home run. Banks' teammate Billy Williams also homers in the ninth inning to tie the game, while Ron Santo's RBI single in the 11th wins it. Atlanta's Rico Carty, meanwhile, has three singles and has hit in 30 consecutive games.
- May 16 – A tragic event occurs during a game between the San Francisco Giants and the Los Angeles Dodgers at Dodger Stadium. Fourteen-year-old Alan Fish is sitting with friends when he's struck in the head by a foul ball off the bat of Dodger outfielder Manny Mota. Fish dies from his injury four days later, becoming the first fan to die from a foul ball strike in major league history.
- May 17 – In the second game of a double header, Hank Aaron of the Atlanta Braves collects his 3,000th career hit with an infield single as well as his 517th home run off of pitcher Wayne Granger, during a 7–6, 15-inning loss to the Cincinnati Reds. In doing so, Aaron becomes the founding member of the 3,000 hits/500 home runs club. In later years, Willie Mays, Eddie Murray, Rafael Palmeiro, Albert Pujols and Alex Rodriguez will join the select circle.
- May 23 – At Candlestick Park, the San Diego Padres defeat the San Francisco Giants, 17–16, in 15 innings on Steve Huntz's home run; the teams combine for 44 hits and four errors. The loss drops the Giants' record to 19–23, fourth in the NL West and 12½ games behind Cincinnati. After the game, they fire second-year manager Clyde King and promote Charlie Fox from Triple-A Phoenix to replace him.
- May 31 – Protecting an eighth-inning 6–1 lead and aiming for his eighth save of 1970, California Angels sophomore ace relief pitcher Ken Tatum throws an inside fastball that strikes Baltimore Orioles outfielder Paul Blair in the face, breaking multiple bones in Blair's nose, cheekbone and eye socket. Remarkably, Blair only misses three weeks of action and returns to the Oriole lineup June 21. Tatum, however, will never be the same. Including today's game, his MLB career totals to date are a 9–3 won–lost record in 65 games pitched, with 30 saves; he's allowed 69 hits and 16 earned runs in 1092/3 innings pitched (for an ERA of 1.31) with 81 strikeouts. But, horrified at the injury he has inadvertently caused, Tatum will stop throwing inside to hitters. His performance will decline, the Angels will trade him, and he'll also suffer a broken cheekbone during batting practice in 1971, among other injuries. Tatum's career ends in 1974 with a 16–12 mark (2.93 ERA) and 52 saves in 176 appearances.

=== June ===
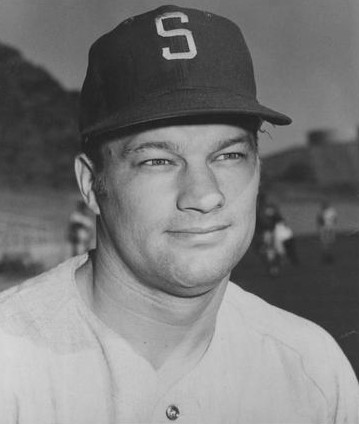
Jim Bouton in 1969, the year he wrote Ball Four

- June 1 – After a national magazine prints excerpts from Ball Four, his soon-to-be-published diary of the 1969 season, Houston Astros pitcher Jim Bouton is called on the carpet by Commissioner of Baseball Bowie Kuhn to "express [his] displeasure" with the book's contents, which reveal private conversations and behaviors—including alcohol and drug use and sexual promiscuity—among major-league players. Kuhn's criticism is mild compared to the stream of vitriol directed at Bouton by others in baseball, but the book (published later this month) becomes a "groundbreaking tome" in sports literature. Meanwhile, Bouton pitches ineffectively for Houston (4–6, 5.40 ERA in 29 appearances), and is sent to the minors after July 29.
- June 5 – At age 19 and two months, Bert Blyleven makes his major league debut with the Minnesota Twins, and gives up a lead-off home run to Washington Senators outfielder Lee Maye. Then the teenager holds on for a 2–1 victory, the first of a 287-win career that will propel his induction into the Baseball Hall of Fame.
- June 7 – The Kansas City Royals fire first-year skipper Charlie Metro and replace him with pitching coach Bob Lemon. The Royals are 19–33 and fifth in the six-team American League West.
- June 8 – Major League Baseball players and management agree to end their labor dispute by settling on a new standard contract. Among the compromises that benefit the players is a raise in the minimum league salary from $10,000 to $12,000 per season.
- June 11
  - Faced with attendance woes at War Memorial Stadium, the 84-year-old Buffalo Bisons, who have played continuously since 1886 and in the International League since 1912, give up the ghost and move to Manitoba, where they are re-christened the Winnipeg Whips. The Triple-A affiliate of the second-year Montreal Expos has lost 35 of its first 45 games. Buffalo will be without Organized Baseball until 1979, when a new Bisons franchise is founded in the Double-A Eastern League.
  - The Oakland Athletics trade veteran southpaw Al Downing and outfielder Tito Francona to the Milwaukee Brewers for outfielder Steve Hovley.
- June 12:
  - In the first game of a doubleheader at San Diego Stadium, Dock Ellis of the Pittsburgh Pirates no-hits the San Diego Padres 2–0. Years later, Ellis will claim that he is under the influence of LSD during the entire game.
  - The 43–16 Cincinnati Reds widen their NL West lead to ten full games and 21-year-old rookie right-hander Wayne Simpson improves to 9–1 with a complete-game, 3–1 triumph over the Philadelphia Phillies at Connie Mack Stadium. A two-run homer by future Hall-of-Famer Tony Pérez—his 23rd of the season—is decisive.
- June 13:
  - The Kansas City Royals acquire second baseman Cookie Rojas from the St. Louis Cardinals for rookie outfielder Fred Rico. Rojas, 31, will make four American League All-Star teams over 7½ seasons as a Royal.
  - The disappointing, 26–29 Cardinals also ship pitcher George Culver to the Houston Astros for infielder Leon McFadden and outfielder Jim Beauchamp.
- June 15:
  - Among a flurry of deals they make at the trading deadline, the Milwaukee Brewers sell the contract of veteran relief pitcher Bob Locker to the Oakland Athletics and acquire reserve outfielder Dave May from the Baltimore Orioles for pitchers Dick Baney and Buzz Stephen. Locker will thrive in Oakland and win a 1972 World Series ring. May earns a regular job in Milwaukee and becomes a 1973 AL All-Star.
  - The Orioles reacquire relief pitcher Moe Drabowsky, a 1966 World Series hero, from the Kansas City Royals for infielder Bobby Floyd. In doing so, they give Drabowsky the chance to earn a second World Series ring.
- June 17 – At Candlestick Park, Ernie Banks and Willie Mays become the first 500 home run club members to each homer in the same game. In the eighth inning of the Chicago Cubs' game against the San Francisco Giants, Banks hits his 504th career home run, a three-run shot off Giant reliever Mike Davison. Mays then hits his 615th career home run off the Cubs' Ken Holtzman in the bottom half of the same inning. The Cubs defeat the Giants, 6–1.
- June 19 – Mike Shannon's two run single in the top of the 17th inning stands up as the winning margin in the St. Louis Cardinals' 5–3 triumph over the Chicago Cubs at Wrigley Field. The victory goes to rookie Al Hrabosky, who fans three over two innings in his second MLB appearance.
- June 21 – The Detroit Tigers' César Gutiérrez gets seven hits in seven at bats in 12 innings against the Cleveland Indians, setting an American League mark and tying a major league record for most hits in one game. The light-hitting Gutiérrez raises his batting average from .218 to .249.
- June 23:
  - The Montreal Expos acquire right-hander Mike Marshall, 27, from the Houston Astros for outfielder Don Bosch. Marshall has bounced from the Detroit Tigers to the Seattle Pilots to Houston since 1967, but in Montreal he will develop into a record-setting relief pitcher.
  - The Atlanta Braves sell the contract of veteran hurler Milt Pappas to the Chicago Cubs.
- June 24:
  - In a 7–2 loss to the Cleveland Indians in the first game of a doubleheader at Yankee Stadium, New York Yankees pitcher Steve Hamilton gets Indians batter Tony Horton to foul out on a pitch known as the "Folly Floater".
  - The Cincinnati Reds defeat the San Francisco Giants, 5–4, in the final game that the Reds will play at Crosley Field, built in 1912. Lee May's game-winning, eighth-inning home run is the last hit in the venerable ballpark's history.
- June 26 – Frank Robinson of the Baltimore Orioles hits grand slams in consecutive innings, the fourth and fifth, in a 12–2 victory over the Washington Senators at Robert F. Kennedy Stadium. The same runners are on base both times: Dave McNally on third, Don Buford on second and Paul Blair on first.
- June 28 – The Pittsburgh Pirates defeat the Chicago Cubs in both games of a doubleheader, 3–2 and 4–1, in the last two games played at Forbes Field, which opened in 1909. A ninth-inning single in the nightcap by the Cubs' Willie Smith is the last safety recorded in the old ball-yard.
- June 30 – Riverfront Stadium opens with the Cincinnati Reds losing to the Atlanta Braves, 8–2. Atlanta second baseman Félix Millán's first-inning single is the inaugural base hit in the multi-purpose facility; he then rides home on Riverfront's first home run, hit by Hank Aaron.

=== July ===
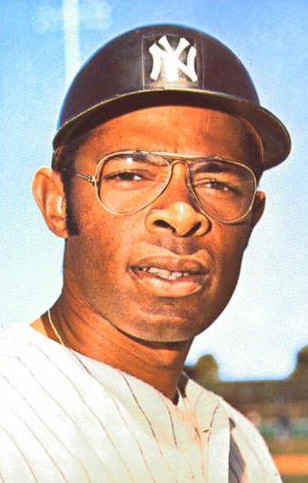
Horace Clarke

- July 1:
  - With 53,863 on hand at Tiger Stadium, Detroit's Denny McLain returns from his three-month suspension on gambling allegations by throwing 5 1/3 innings against the New York Yankees. He allows five earned runs on eight hits, including homers by Jerry Kenney, Thurman Munson and Bobby Murcer, and departs with his club trailing 5–3. McLain doesn't get tagged with a loss when Tigers go on to rally and win in extra innings. But it signals a downturn for 1968's MVP and Cy Young Award winner; he pitches poorly, and is suspended twice in September, the latter time for carrying a gun on the team's airplane.
  - The St. Louis Cardinals trade well-traveled relief pitcher Ted Abernathy to the Kansas City Royals for fellow right-hander Chris Zachary.
- July 2:
  - In the following game of the Yankees–Tigers series at Detroit, the Tigers' Joe Niekro pitches 8 1/3 innings of no-hit baseball until a one-out single by Horace Clarke breaks up the gem with the only safety Niekro will allow in a 5–0 victory. It's the third no-hit bid that Clarke has spoiled in the ninth inning in less than a month; earlier, he had foiled bids by Jim Rooker on June 4 and Sonny Siebert (who had already pitched a no-hitter in 1966) on June 19.
  - John Bateman of the Montreal Expos sets a team record with seven runs batted in to pace the Expos to a 13–10 victory over the St. Louis Cardinals. His feat includes a grand slam in the Expos' six-run first inning.
  - The Kansas City Royals sign 20-year-old undrafted amateur free agent Frank White, a future eight-time Gold Glove Award-winning second baseman and five-time American League All-Star. The signing is also significant because White is a graduate of the experimental Kansas City Royals Baseball Academy, founded by owner Ewing Kauffman to train elite athletes like White with limited baseball experience. White will be the most illustrious alumnus of the Academy, which shuts down in 1974.
- July 3:
  - Clyde Wright of the California Angels has a doubly memorable day. In a ceremony before the Angels' game against the Oakland Athletics at Anaheim Stadium, the former star pitcher at Carson-Newman College (with whom he won an NAIA Baseball World Series title in 1965) is inducted into the NAIA Hall of Fame. He then no-hits the Athletics 4–0, the first no-hitter in the stadium's history.
  - At Wrigley Field, the Pittsburgh Pirates and Chicago Cubs combine for 40 hits and 30 runs in a nine-inning game. The Pirates prevail in both categories, winning 16–14 on the strength of 22 hits, including six home runs.
- July 4 – The pennant races at the season's traditional halfway point show the defending World Series champion New York Mets (42–36) one-half game in front of the Pittsburgh Pirates (43–38) in the NL East. The next-closest races are in the American League, where the Baltimore Orioles (49–30) lead the New York Yankees (44–33) in the AL East and the Minnesota Twins (48–26) outpace the California Angels (46–32) in the AL West; in each case the division leader boasts a four-game bulge over its nearest rival. The only runaway division is the NL West, where the Cincinnati Reds (56–23) lead the second-place Los Angeles Dodgers (46–32) by 9½ games. The nickname "Big Red Machine," coined on July 4, 1969, by a Cincinnati baseball writer, is now being used widely by commentators throughout baseball.
- July 8 – San Francisco Giants third baseman Jim Ray Hart ties a modern Major League record with six runs batted in during one inning. All come in the fifth, with Hart slamming a three-run home run and three-run triple in the frame. He eventually completes his record-setting day by hitting for the cycle en route to a 13–0 victory over the Atlanta Braves.
- July 14 – At Riverfront Stadium, the National League wins its eighth straight All-Star Game, a 12-inning 5–4 victory. Pete Rose crashes into Cleveland Indians catcher Ray Fosse to score the winning run on Jim Hickman's single. Fosse, who never had the ball, hurts his right shoulder and is taken to the hospital. This All-Star Game had seen voting returned to the fans via punch-card ballots distributed in major league ballparks, and is the first Midsummer Classic since 1958 for which the squads were not entirely selected by managers, coaches and players.
- July 16 – Pittsburgh's Three Rivers Stadium opens to the public, but the Cincinnati Reds spoil the party by defeating the Pirates, 4–3, before a crowd of 48,846. The first hit at the stadium is a single by Pittsburgh's Richie Hebner. The first home run at the new ballpark is struck by Cincinnati's Tony Pérez.
- July 18 – Willie Mays of the San Francisco Giants records his 3,000th career hit.
- July 20:
  - At Dodger Stadium, Bill Singer of the Los Angeles Dodgers no-hits the Philadelphia Phillies, 5–0. Singer's catcher, Jeff Torborg, had caught Sandy Koufax's perfect game in 1965, and will later catch the first of Nolan Ryan's seven no-hitters, in 1973.
  - The San Francisco Giants and New York Yankees swap left-handed pitchers, with the Giants sending former Cy Young Award winner Mike McCormick, 31, to New York for John Cumberland, 23.
- July 26 – Johnny Bench of the Cincinnati Reds belts three straight home runs off St. Louis Cardinals pitcher Steve Carlton. On the same day, Orlando Cepeda, of the Atlanta Braves, also connected three consecutive homers in an 8–3 victory over the Chicago Cubs. Bench, Carlton and Cepeda are future Hall of Famers.
- July 29 – The 51–49 Cubs, only four games out of first place in the NL East, purchase the contract of first baseman Joe Pepitone from the Houston Astros.

=== August ===
- August 1 – At Atlanta–Fulton County Stadium, Willie Stargell of the Pittsburgh Pirates hits three doubles and two home runs in the Pirates' 20–10 win over the Atlanta Braves. He becomes the third player in modern-day Major League history to collect five extra-base hits in one game, Lou Boudreau and Joe Adcock having done so in 1946 and 1954 respectively. Coincidentally, this game is nationally broadcast, and a trivia question early in the contest was to name the two players who had gotten five extra-base hits in a game. Bob Robertson also collects five hits for the Pirates, including a home run; not until Andrew McCutchen and Garrett Jones in 2010 will two Pirates collect five hits each in the same game.
- August 2 – The Pittsburgh Pirates' Bob Robertson lashes a two-run double and then follows with two 400-foot homers, driving in a total of six runs as the Pirates beat the Atlanta Braves 10–7.
- August 10 – At Fenway Park, the Detroit Tigers almost overcome a ninth-inning 11–3 deficit, scoring seven runs (five of then unearned) off Sonny Siebert and Sparky Lyle before Chuck Hartenstein whiffs Bill Freehan to preserve the Boston Red Sox' 11–10 victory.
- August 11:
  - Philadelphia's Jim Bunning beats the Houston Astros 6–5 to become the first pitcher to win 100 games in both leagues since Cy Young.
  - The St. Louis Cardinals erase 8–2 and 10–6 deficits by scoring five times in the bottom of the ninth to defeat the San Diego Padres 11–10. Carl Taylor caps the Redbird comeback by smashing a three-run walk-off home run.
- August 19 – Ferguson Jenkins throws a complete game and hits his second homer of the season in the Chicago Cubs' 12–2 triumph over the visiting Padres. The Cubs belt seven home runs on the day, including two from Jim Hickman.
- August 22 – Roberto Clemente singles, steals second, and scores on a hit by Jerry May, giving the visiting Pittsburgh Pirates a clutch 2–1, 16-inning victory over the Los Angeles Dodgers.
- August 30:
  - Nine different players—five California Angels and four Cleveland Indians—hit home runs in the Angels' 10–9 triumph over Cleveland at Municipal Stadium.
  - At Comiskey Park, three different Boston Red Sox players (Mike Andrews, Reggie Smith and George Scott) have four-hit games, enabling their club to overwhelm the Chicago White Sox, 21–11. Scott and Carl Yastrzemski hit home runs.
- August 31 – The second-place Angels, only three games in arrears of the Minnesota Twins in the AL West, purchase the contract of veteran outfielder Tony González from the Atlanta Braves.

=== September ===
- September 3 – Billy Williams of the Chicago Cubs asks to be kept out of the lineup, snapping his National League record of 1,117 consecutive games played. His record will be broken in 1983 by Steve Garvey.
- September 4 – The Chicago White Sox continue their management makeover by appointing Roland Hemond director of player personnel and Chuck Tanner field manager. Both come from the California Angels' organization, where Tanner had led the 1970 Hawaii Islanders of the Pacific Coast League to a 98–48 record. He becomes the White Sox' permanent skipper, succeeding the fired Don Gutteridge, when he takes the reins September 18. In the midst of a nightmarish 56–106 season, the ChiSox began their housecleaning September 1 when Stu Holcomb replaced Ed Short as general manager and Gutteridge was released.
- September 7 – The Labor Day leaderboard shows a "dogfight" in the National League East Division, where the Pittsburgh Pirates (75–65) lead the New York Mets (73–66) by 1½ games and the Chicago Cubs (73–67) by two. The other pennant races aren't so close: in the AL West, the Minnesota Twins (83–55) now lead the second-place Oakland Athletics (78–62) by six and the third-place California Angels (76–63) by 7½; and the Baltimore Orioles (89–51) and Cincinnati Reds (90–53) are running away with their divisions, with the Orioles nine games ahead of the New York Yankees (80–60) in the AL East and the Reds 11 games in front of the Los Angeles Dodgers (77–62) in the NL West.
- September 10 – At Shea Stadium, Cleon Jones' 14th-inning triple drives home Tommie Agee with the winning run and newly acquired reliever Ron Herbel gets the win, as the Mets edge the Philadelphia Phillies 3–2 and move into a flat-footed tie with the Pirates in the NL East. The Cubs are only one game back. Nineteen games remain in the regular season for the three contenders.
- September 14 – Bolstering their bullpen for the season's final stretch, the Pirates obtain pitcher Mudcat Grant from the Oakland Athletics for young outfielder Ángel Mangual ("PTBNL"). Former 20-game-winner Grant, now 35, has become one of MLB's top relief pitchers, with a 6–2 (1.82 ERA) record and 24 saves for Oakland.
- September 16:
  - Minnesota Twins pitcher Bert Blyleven strikes out the first six California Angels batters off the game, and ties a major league record. Blyleven will finish the game with ten strikeouts, but take the 5–1 loss.
  - The Oakland Athletics deal another key player to a National League East Division contender, selling the contract of outfielder Tommy Davis, 31, to the Chicago Cubs, who are tied for second place and two games from the lead.
- September 17 – Although they bow 2–0 to the Washington Senators, the Baltimore Orioles clinch their second straight AL East title when the Boston Red Sox eliminate the New York Yankees by downing the Bombers 5–4 in The Bronx. Meanwhile, the idle Cincinnati Reds win their first NL West crown when their closest rival, the Los Angeles Dodgers, are soundly beaten 10–5 by the Houston Astros.
- September 18 – In the NL East's version of an "arms race," the New York Mets purchase the contract of veteran former two-time 20-game-winner and Cy Young Award recipient Dean Chance, 29, from the Cleveland Indians. The Mets are 2½ games behind the Pittsburgh Pirates (who defeat them 3–2 at Shea Stadium today behind Steve Blass) with a dozen games to play.
- September 21:
  - At Oakland–Alameda County Coliseum, 21-year-old Vida Blue of the Athletics no-hits the Minnesota Twins 6–0, the only baserunner coming on Harmon Killebrew's second-inning walk. The no-hitter caps a season that witnesses four no-hitters, all pitched in California-based big-league stadiums; Candlestick Park is the only one of the five not to host a no-hitter. It is also the second time in three seasons an Oakland pitcher has no-hit the Twins, who were on the losing end of Catfish Hunter's perfect game in 1968.
  - The Chicago Cubs, two games from the NL East lead today with ten to play, acquire 47-year-old future Hall-of-Fame hurler Hoyt Wilhelm from the Atlanta Braves. In Chicago, Wilhelm is reunited with Leo Durocher, who managed the knuckleballer when he was a rookie with the 1952 New York Giants.
- September 22 – One day after being no-hit, the Twins register a 5–3 win over the second-place Athletics to clinch the American League West. They claim the division title on exactly the same date as they had in 1969.
- September 27:
  - There are no miracles in 1970 for the reigning World Series champion New York Mets, as the Pittsburgh Pirates capture the National League East with a 2–1 victory over the Mets before the largest crowd in brand-new Three Rivers Stadium history (50,461). New York strands 12 baserunners during the loss.
  - The second-ever League Championship Series matchups are determined. While the 1970 ALCS will feature a return engagement between 1969's combatants, the Baltimore Orioles and Minnesota Twins, the 1970 NLCS will feature two teams who haven't made the postseason since the early 1960s: the Pirates, who won the 1960 World Series, and Cincinnati Reds, winners of the 1961 NL pennant. Roberto Clemente and Bill Mazeroski, both future Hall of Famers, remain from the Bucs' 1960 champions. Seldom-used Jim Maloney, Cincinnati's former mound ace, is the lone survivor of 1961's league champs.

=== October ===
- October 1:
  - With two hits in three at bats, California Angels outfielder Alex Johnson (.3289) edges Carl Yastrzemski of the Boston Red Sox (.3286) for the American League batting crown. Nevertheless, 1970 is a strong season for Yastrzemski, who leads the AL in runs scored, slugs 40 homers, collects 102 RBI, and is the MVP of the 1970 Major League Baseball All-Star Game.
  - Vic Davalillo of the St. Louis Cardinals breaks the National League single-season pinch hitting record and ties the Major League record with his 24th pinch hit of the year.
  - The Philadelphia Phillies defeat the Montreal Expos 2–1 in 10 innings in the final game at Connie Mack Stadium, which opened as Shibe Park in 1909. The occasion is marred when fans literally dismantle the stadium while the game is still in progress. A special post-game ceremony — including a helicopter delivery to Veterans Stadium of home plate — is cancelled. The North Philadelphia ballyard is the third venerable National League park to close during 1970.
- October 2:
  - Oakland Athletics owner Charles O. Finley switches managers again, firing John McNamara after a second-place finish and hiring former Boston Red Sox pilot Dick Williams as his successor. It's Finley's tenth managerial change in ten full seasons as owner of the Athletics franchise—but it will be the most successful. Williams will last three seasons under Finley and produce one American League West champion in 1971, then World Series titles in both 1972 and 1973. Williams will enter the Baseball Hall of Fame in 2008 as a result.
  - One day after their disappointing season ends, the Detroit Tigers shake up their field leadership by firing manager Mayo Smith and replacing him with Billy Martin. Smith had led Detroit to the 1968 World Series championship. For Martin, the Tigers become the second stop on what will be a tumultuous, 16-year managerial career.
- October 5:
  - The Baltimore Orioles and Cincinnati Reds reach the World Series by sweeping away their opponents, the Minnesota Twins and Pittsburgh Pirates, in their respective best-of-five League Championship Series. All four LCS matchups since divisional play was launched in 1969 have now produced decisive, three-games-to-none results.
  - The St. Louis Cardinals trade first baseman Dick Allen to the Los Angeles Dodgers for second baseman Ted Sizemore and catcher Bob Stinson. Allen's one season as a Cardinal yields 34 homers, 101 RBI and an All-Star nod, but he plays in only 122 games.
- October 9 – In a trade that will be momentous for both teams, the Detroit Tigers deal former MVP and Cy Young Award winner Denny McLain, fellow hurler Norm McRae, third baseman Don Wert and outfielder Elliott Maddox to the Washington Senators for hurlers Joe Coleman and Jim Hannan, shortstop Ed Brinkman and third baseman Aurelio Rodríguez. McLain had gone only 3–5 (4.63) in 14 games in 1970 after spending the first half of the season under suspension for alleged gambling-related offenses—this after he had won a combined 55 games in 1968 and 1969. In Washington, his performance will continue to deteriorate in 1971, as he loses 22 of 32 decisions and fails to provide the drawing power the Senators vitally need; they will move to Arlington, Texas, after the season and become the Texas Rangers in 1972. Meanwhile, Coleman moves to the top of the Tiger rotation, winning 62 games from 1971–1973, and Brinkman and Rodríguez will anchor the left side of the Detroit infield through 1974.
- October 11 – The Boston Red Sox trade 25-year-old local star Tony Conigliaro (36 HR, 116 RBI, .266) to the California Angels, along with pitcher Ray Jarvis and catcher Jerry Moses, for pitcher Ken Tatum, second baseman Doug Griffin and outfielder Jarvis Tatum. Hampered by poor vision after a beanball struck him in the face in August 1967, Conigliaro will play only 74 games for the 1971 Angels before retiring.
- October 12 – The Houston Astros and Chicago Cubs exchange shortstops when Houston acquires 23-year-old prospect Roger Metzger for Héctor Torres. Metzger will be the Astros' regular shortstop until 1977; although he will struggle offensively, he will win an NL Gold Glove Award in 1973.
- October 13 – The Chicago White Sox trade first baseman Gail Hopkins and outfielder John Matias to the Kansas City Royals for pitcher Don O'Riley and outfielder Pat Kelly.
- October 15 – For the third time in the 1970 World Series, the Baltimore Orioles overcome a 3–0 deficit to bury the Cincinnati Reds 9–3 in Game 5 of the Fall Classic, and win the world championship, four games to one. Frank Robinson and Merv Rettenmund each homer and drive in two runs. Third baseman Brooks Robinson, the "human vacuum cleaner", easily wins the Series MVP award.
- October 20 – The Milwaukee Brewers trade pitchers George Lauzerique and Jessie Huggins and catcher Jerry McNertney to the St. Louis Cardinals for left-hander Jim Ellis and catcher Carl Taylor.
- October 21 – The Cardinals acquire their 1950s "bonus baby" Ducky Schofield for the third time in the infielder's career, this time from the Boston Red Sox for first baseman/outfielder Jim Campbell. Schofield, now 35 and an 18-year MLB veteran, formerly played for the Redbirds from 1953–1958 and in 1968.

=== November ===
- November 3 – The Washington Senators acquire six-time Gold Glove Award and three-time National League All-Star centerfielder Curt Flood from the Philadelphia Phillies in a five-player transaction. Flood, 32 and then still in his prime, sat out the entire 1970 campaign while he legally challenged the reserve clause; he never donned a Phillie uniform. He will be the Senators' Opening Day centerfielder in 1971, but appear in only 13 games and play poorly. He leaves the team, and Major League Baseball, on April 26.
- November 10 – Boog Powell, first baseman for the American League and World Series champion Baltimore Orioles, is selected AL MVP. Powell (.297, 35 HR, 114 RBI, and named to his fourth All-Star team) beats out two future Hall of Famers from the Minnesota Twins, Tony Oliva and Harmon Killebrew.
- November 18 – Cooperstown-bound catcher Johnny Bench of the National League champ Cincinnati Reds garners 22 of 24 first-place votes to grab the 1970 NL MVP Award.
- November 21 – New York Mets outfielder Tommie Agee becomes the first non-pitcher to win a Gold Glove in both leagues. Agee also won the honor with the Chicago White Sox during his 1966 rookie of the year season.
- November 25 – New York Yankees catcher Thurman Munson receives 23 of 24 first-place votes and is named American League Rookie of the Year. Munson batted .302 with six home runs and 53 RBI in 132 games during the regular season. Cleveland Indians outfielder Roy Foster (.268, 23, 60) is also named on a first place ballot.
- November 27 – Pitcher Carl Morton, who posted an 18–11 record with 154 strikeouts and a 3.60 ERA for the last-place Montreal Expos, receives the National League Rookie of the Year Award. Morton beats out Cincinnati Reds outfielder Bernie Carbo, who hit .310 with 21 home runs and 63 RBI.
- November 30:
  - The California Angels trade pitcher Tom Bradley, catcher Tom Egan and outfielder Jay Johnstone to the Chicago White Sox for pitcher Billy Wynne, infielder Syd O'Brien and outfielder Ken Berry. Bradley, 23, will win 15 games for the Pale Hose in both 1971 and 1972.
  - The Chicago Cubs acquire brothers Hal and Danny Breeden in two separate transactions. First baseman Hal, 26, comes from the Atlanta Braves, who reacquire veteran knuckleballer Hoyt Wilhelm in the deal. Catcher Danny, 28, arrives from the Cincinnati Reds in exchange for outfielder Willie Smith.

=== December ===
- December 1:
  - The world-champion Baltimore Orioles acquire starting pitcher Pat Dobson and relief pitcher Tom Dukes from the San Diego Padres for pitchers Tom Phoebus, Fred Beene and Al Severinsen and shortstop Enzo Hernández. In 1971, Dobson will win an even twenty games and join Mike Cuellar, Jim Palmer and Dave McNally as one of four 20-game-winners on the Oriole mound staff.
  - The Boston Red Sox trade second baseman Mike Andrews and shortstop Luis Alvarado to the Chicago White Sox in exchange for 36-year-old, future Hall of Fame shortstop Luis Aparicio.
  - The Atlanta Braves trade veteran third baseman Bob Aspromonte to the New York Mets for relief pitcher Ron Herbel. Native Brooklynite Aspromonte, 32, will become the last member of the Brooklyn Dodgers to appear in an MLB game on September 28, 1971.
- December 2 – The Kansas City Royals acquire shortstop Freddie Patek, pitcher Bruce Dal Canton and catcher Jerry May from the Pittsburgh Pirates for fire-balling pitcher Bob Johnson, catcher Jim Campanis and shortstop Jackie Hernández. The 5 ft 5 in (1.65 m) Patek will hold down Kansas City's shortstop job for nine years and be selected to three American League All-Star teams.
- December 11 – The Cleveland Indians trade lefty-swinging catcher Duke Sims to the Los Angeles Dodgers for pitchers Alan Foster and Ray Lamb.
- December 15 – Jim Maloney, the Cincinnati Reds' ace starting pitcher for much of the 1960s, is traded to the California Angels for southpaw reliever Greg Garrett. Maloney, 30, threw two no-hitters and twice won 20 or more games in a Cincinnati uniform. In 1971, he will appear in only 13 games as an Angel during his final MLB season.
- December 16 – The Baltimore Orioles trade outfielder and minor-league slugger Roger Freed to the Philadelphia Phillies for left-hander Grant Jackson, utilityman Jim Hutto and outfielder Sam Parrilla.
- December 17 – Marvin Milkes resigns as general manager of the Milwaukee Brewers. Milkes, who had moved to Wisconsin with the Seattle Pilots in April, was a frequent target of Jim Bouton's derision in Bouton's recently-published memoir, Ball Four.
- December 28 – The Montreal Expos acquire second baseman Ron Hunt from the San Francisco Giants for first baseman Dave McDonald. As an Expo for just short of four full seasons, Hunt will continue his streak of leading the National League in being hit by a pitch into 1974, including an MLB-record 50 HBPs in 1971.

== Births ==
=== January ===
- January 1 – Gary Wilson
- January 2 – Royce Clayton
- January 5 – Brian Runge
- January 6 – Dan Naulty
- January 9 – T. J. Mathews
- January 12 – Nigel Wilson
- January 14 – Steve Cooke
- January 16 – Ron Villone
- January 18 – Mike Bertotti
- January 19
  - Rick Krivda
  - Ricky Pickett
- January 20 – Marvin Benard
- January 21 – Jeff McCurry
- January 23
  - Alan Embree
  - Sherman Obando
  - Mark Wohlers
- January 26 – Dan Carlson
- January 27 – Jessie Hollins
- January 31
  - Joel Bennett
  - Chris Pritchett

=== February ===
- February 1
  - Edwin Hurtado
  - Joe Vitko
- February 4 – John Frascatore
- February 5 – Chris Brock
- February 6 – Mark Hutton
- February 9 – John Burke
- February 10
  - Alberto Castillo
  - Bobby J. Jones
- February 13 – Kevin Stocker
- February 14
  - Takashi Saito
  - Kelly Stinnett
- February 18 – Tyler Green

=== March ===
- March 4
  - John Dettmer
  - Dave Stevens
- March 6 – Scott Stahoviak
- March 11 – Pedro Castellano
- March 13 – Jorge Fábregas
- March 14 – Brent Gates
- March 16 – Curt Schmidt
- March 20 – Will Brunson
- March 21 – Rick DeHart
- March 24 – Wilson Álvarez
- March 27 – Derek Aucoin

=== April ===
- April 1 – Matt Herges
- April 2
  - Dennis Hocking
  - Jon Lieber
- April 5 – Ryan Karp
- April 6 – Tim Belk
- April 10
  - Rob Butler
  - Al Reyes
- April 11
  - Sean Bergman
  - Joe Vitiello
- April 13 – Ricardo Rincón
- April 14 – Steve Avery
- April 18
  - Rico Brogna
  - Steve Dunn
- April 25 – Sean Mulligan
- April 27 – Mike Neill
- April 28 – Bill Hurst
- April 29 – J. R. Phillips

=== May ===
- May 2 – Joe Crawford
- May 5 – Juan Acevedo
- May 7
  - Brook Fordyce
  - Mark Smith
- May 14 – Larry Sutton
- May 15 – Scott Watkins
- May 16 – Jim Mecir
- May 18 – Scott Baker
- May 21
  - Bryce Florie
  - Tom Martin
- May 23 – Ricky Gutiérrez
- May 25
  - Joey Eischen
  - Luis Ortiz
- May 30 – John Courtright
- May 31 – Dilson Torres

=== June ===
- June 2
  - Reid Cornelius
  - Mike Kelly
- June 5 – Gene Schall
- June 11 – Bill Selby
- June 12 – Damon Buford
- June 20 – Mike Grace
- June 23 – Juan Castillo
- June 25 – Aaron Sele
- June 27
  - Jim Edmonds
  - Ricardo Jordan
- June 28 – Kevin Polcovich
- June 30 – Mark Grudzielanek

=== July ===
- July 5 – Doug Bochtler
- July 11 – Billy Ashley
- July 14
  - Mark Brandenburg
  - Tim Davis
- July 15 – Joey Long
- July 16 – William Van Landingham
- July 25 – Garey Ingram
- July 29
  - Todd Dunn
  - Steve Wojciechowski
- July 31 – Mike Figga

=== August ===
- August 4 – Dax Jones
- August 7
  - Rich Croushore
  - Bruce Dreckman
  - Greg Pirkl
  - Marc Pisciotta
- August 9 – Pat Mahomes
- August 12 – Jim Schlossnagle
- August 13 – Eddie Gaillard
- August 15 – Tony Rodríguez
- August 16 – Quinton McCracken
- August 18 – Bobby Higginson
- August 19 – Jeff Tam
- August 21 – Craig Counsell
- August 24 – B. J. Waszgis
- August 25
  - Duff Brumley
  - Doug Glanville
- August 27 – Jim Thome

=== September ===
- September 2 – Sean Lawrence
- September 3
  - Dave Berg
  - Chad Fox
  - Craig Wilson
- September 4 – Luis López
- September 5 – Mike Potts
- September 9
  - Joey Hamilton
  - Dan Miceli
- September 12 – Tito Navarro
- September 15 – José Zapata
- September 16
  - Bronswell Patrick
  - Paul Shuey
- September 18 – Ozzie Timmons
- September 20 – Chris Snopek
- September 22 – Mike Matheny
- September 24 – Paul Spoljaric
- September 25 – Ray Holbert
- September 26 – Matt Murray
- September 28
  - Brian Banks
  - Mike DeJean
- September 29
  - Gary Haught
  - Joe Hudson

=== October ===
- October 1 – Massimo Ciaramella
- October 2 – Eddie Guardado
- October 3
  - Roger Bailey
  - Manny Martínez
- October 6 – Darren Oliver
- October 7 – Tim Unroe
- October 8
  - David Doster
  - Sandy Martínez
  - Olmedo Sáenz
- October 9 – Mike Robertson
- October 12 – Tanyon Sturtze
- October 13 – Kennie Steenstra
- October 16 – Scott Ray Davison
- October 17 – John Mabry
- October 18 – Doug Mirabelli
- October 21 – Marc Wilkins
- October 22 – Anthony Chavez
- October 25
  - Curtis King
  - Terrell Lowery
- October 27 – Pedro Swann
- October 29 – Kerwin Moore
- October 31 – Steve Trachsel

=== November ===
- November 2 – Marcus Moore
- November 5
  - Glenn Dishman
  - Javy López
- November 6 – Chris Petersen
- November 9 – Chad Ogea
- November 11 – Jeff Ware
- November 13 – Vic Darensbourg
- November 16 – Héctor Fajardo
- November 18 – Allen Watson
- November 19
  - Jeff Berblinger
  - J. J. Thobe
- November 23 – Glenn Murray
- November 24 – Jason Jacome
- November 29 – Steve Rodriguez

=== December ===
- December 1 – Kirk Rueter
- December 3 – Paul Byrd
- December 5 – Andy Stewart
- December 9 – Tony Tarasco
- December 12 – Mike Buddie
- December 15
  - Robert Ellis
  - Rick Helling
- December 17 – Mike Cather
- December 18 – Mike Gulan
- December 19 – Tom Wilson
- December 21 – John Hope
- December 25 – Steve Montgomery
- December 30
  - Ben Blomdahl
  - Bart Evans
  - Chad Fairchild

== Deaths ==
=== January ===
- January 4 – Brad Springer, 65, pitcher who played from 1925 to 1926 for the St. Louis Browns and the Cincinnati Reds.
- January 7 – Jumbo Elliott, 69, 235 lb (107 kg) pitcher for the St. Louis Browns, Brooklyn Robins, Philadelphia Phillies and Boston Braves between 1923 and 1934, who led the National League with 19 wins in 1931.
- January 9 – Ray Collins, 82, pitcher for the Boston Red Sox from 1909 to 1915, who later coached at University of Vermont.
- January 10 – Harvey Freeman, 78, pitcher for the 1921 Philadelphia Athletics.
- January 12
  - Doc Bass, 72, utility man who played for the 1918 Boston Braves.
  - Andy Bruckmiller, 88, pitcher for the 1908 Detroit Tigers.
- January 14 – Johnny Murphy, 61, general manager of the New York Mets from December 1967 until suffering a fatal heart attack, three months after the Mets' 1969 world championship season; formerly a standout relief pitcher for the New York Yankees for a dozen years between 1932 and 1946, who established the career saves record until it was broken in 1962; eight-time World Series champion: seven with Yankees as an active player, and one as GM of the 1969 "Miracle Mets".
- January 15 – Bill Leard, 84, second baseman for the 1917 Brooklyn Robins.
- January 17 – Alex Mustaikis, 60, pitcher for the 1940 Boston Red Sox.
- January 18 – Jack Richardson, 77, pitcher who played from 1915 to 1916 with the Philadelphia Athletics.
- January 21
  - Bob Asbjornson, 60, catcher who played from 1928 to 1932 for the Boston Red Sox and Cincinnati Reds.
  - Harry Shriver, 73, pitcher for the 1921–1922 Brooklyn Robins.
- January 23 – Bill Conroy, 71, infielder for the 1923 Washington Senators.
- January 24 – Hal McKain, 63, pitcher who played for the Cleveland Indians and Chicago White Sox in all or parts of five seasons spanning 1927–1932.
- January 25 – Harvey Grubb, 79, third baseman for the 1912 Cleveland Naps.
- January 26 – Jim Haislip, 78, pitcher for the 1913 Philadelphia Phillies.
- January 28 – Orie Arntzen, 60, pitcher for the 1943 Philadelphia Athletics.
- January 29 – Miguel Fuentes, 23, Puerto Rican pitcher for the Seattle Pilots during the 1969 season, who was murdered in a bar fight in his home town of Loíza.

=== February ===
- February 3 – Cool Turner, 68, infielder who played in the Negro leagues between 1921 and 1932; later an umpire in the Negro National League and head baseball coach of North Carolina College.
- February 5 – Rudy York, 56, first baseman and seven-time All-Star who had six 100-RBI seasons for the Detroit Tigers and Boston Red Sox, while hitting a record 18 homers in one month as a rookie, and two grand slams in a 1946 game; coached for Red Sox (1959–1962), serving as Boston's interim manager for one game on July 3, 1959.
- February 6 – Dick Mauney, 50, pitcher for the Philadelphia Athletics from 1945 to 1947
- February 8 – John Churry, 69, reserve catcher for the Chicago Cubs who appeared in only 12 total games in four seasons (1924–1927).
- February 13 – Paul Edmondson, 27, Chicago White Sox starting pitcher who went 1–6 (3.70 ERA) in 14 games in 1969; died in a car crash the day after his birthday.
- February 14 – Ruben Jones, 76, outfielder who appeared in the Negro leagues between 1924 and 1940, principally for the Birmingham Black Barons and Indianapolis ABCs.
- February 16 – Dick Conger, 48, pitcher for the Detroit Tigers, Pittsburgh Pirates and Philadelphia Phillies between 1940 and 1943.
- February 21
  - Tom Carey, 63, infielder for the St. Louis Browns and Boston Red Sox between 1935 and 1946, later a coach with the Red Sox.
  - Joe Shaute, 70, pitcher who won 99 games from 1922 to 1934 for the Cleveland Indians, Brooklyn Robins/Dodgers and Cincinnati Reds.
- February 26 – Bill Bankston, 76, outfielder who played in 11 games for the 1915 Philadelphia Athletics; led minor leagues with 31 homers in 1914 during "Dead Ball Era".

=== March ===
- March 3
  - Jimmy Claxton, 77, multiracial Canadian-born left-hander who appeared in two games for the 1916 Oakland Oaks of the Pacific Coast League; when it came to light that Claxton had African ancestry (as well as Indigenous American and European), he was handed his unconditional release; later played Negro leagues ball as a member of the Washington Pilots and Pollock's Cuban Stars of the East–West League in 1932.
  - Bill McAllester, 81, catcher who appeared in 49 games for the 1913 St. Louis Browns.
- March 6 – Bob Adams, 63, pitcher who worked in five games for the 1931–1932 Philadelphia Phillies.
- March 11 – Bill Kerksieck, 56, pitcher who appeared in 23 games for the 1939 Philadelphia Phillies.
- March 14 – Jim Levey, 63, shortstop for the St. Louis Browns from 1930 through 1933.
- March 18
  - John Misse, 84, shortstop for the 1914 St. Louis Terriers of the "outlaw" Federal League.
  - Frosty Thomas, 88, pitcher for the 1905 Detroit Tigers, who also collected 85 wins with the Minneapolis Millers of the Western League from 1902 to 1907.
- March 20 – Jack Flater, 86, pitcher for the 1908 Philadelphia Athletics.

=== April ===
- April 2
  - Dave Hoskins, 52, pitcher who won nine games for the 1953–1954 Cleveland Indians; former member of the Homestead Grays who in 1952 became the first African-American to play in the Double-A Texas League.
  - Carl Ray, 81, left-handed pitcher who appeared in five games for the 1915–1916 Philadelphia Athletics.
- April 7 – Ollie Voigt, 71, pitcher who worked in eight games for the 1924 St. Louis Browns.
- April 8 – Lee Handley, 57, an infielder for the Pittsburgh Pirates (1937–1941 and 1944–1946), who also played with 1936 Cincinnati Reds and 1947 Philadelphia Phillies.
- April 11
  - Joe Heving, 69, pitcher for five MLB clubs, primarily the Cleveland Indians and Boston Red Sox, over 13 seasons spanning 1930 to 1945; at age 43, led American League pitchers with 63 appearances in 1944, despite being the only grandfather playing in the majors; brother of Johnnie Heving.
  - Johnny Meador, 77, pitcher who went 0–2 (4.21 ERA) in 12 games for the 1920 Pittsburgh Pirates.
  - Sailor Stroud, 84, pitcher who posted a 5–7 record with a 3.25 ERA and three shutouts for the Detroit Tigers (1915) and New York Giants (1916).
- April 12 – Red Shannon, 73, backup infielder who appeared in 310 games over seven seasons spanning 1915 to 1926 for five clubs, chiefly the Philadelphia Athletics, Boston Red Sox and Washington Senators.
- April 14
  - Ed Crowley, 63, third baseman who appeared in two games for the 1928 Senators.
  - John Donaldson, 78, star pitcher in the Negro leagues, mainly with the All Nations team and Kansas City Monarchs.
- April 15 – Ripper Collins, 66, All-Star first baseman who in 1934 led the NL in homers and batted .367 in the World Series, as a member of the St. Louis Cardinals' "Gashouse Gang".
- April 16 – Mal Eason, 91, pitcher for the Chicago Orphans, Boston Beaneaters, Detroit Tigers and Brooklyn Superbas in the early 20th century.
- April 17 – Dick Brown, 35, catcher who hit 62 home runs with 223 RBI in 636 games between 1957 and 1965 for the Cleveland Indians, Chicago White Sox, Detroit Tigers and Baltimore Orioles before his career was ended by brain cancer.
- April 18 – Tony York, 57, infielder for the 1944 Chicago Cubs, and one of many major leaguers who only played during World War II.
- April 20
  - Ed Mensor, 84, outfielder for the 1912–1914 Pittsburgh Pirates.
  - Jake Mooty, 58, pitcher who appeared in 111 games over seven years between 1936 and 1944 for the Cincinnati Reds, Chicago Cubs and Detroit Tigers.
- April 25
  - Gene Steinbrenner, 77, shortstop who played in three games for the 1912 Philadelphia Phillies.
  - Earl Wolgamot, 77, longtime minor league catcher and manager who was a coach for the Cleveland Indians from 1931 to 1935.
- April 26 – Yats Wuestling, 66, backup shortstop who played from 1929 to 1930 for the Tigers and Yankees.
- April 30
  - Chick Gagnon, 72, infielder who briefly appeared for the 1922 Detroit Tigers and 1924 Washington Senators.
  - Dan Jessee, 69, who got into one game as a pinch runner for the 1929 Cleveland Indians.

=== May ===
- May 2 – Art Delaney, 73, pitcher who appeared in 67 games over three seasons for the St. Louis Cardinals (1924) and Boston Braves (1928–1929).
- May 3 – Cal Drummond, 52, American League umpire who worked in 1,369 league games from 1960 to 1969, the first of 1961's two MLB All-Star games, and the 1966 World Series; struck in the head by a foul ball on June 10, 1969, resulting in a blood clot to the brain, and died while attempting a 1970 comeback in the Triple-A American Association.
- May 9 – Ducky Yount, 84, pitcher who worked in 13 games for the Baltimore Terrapins of the "outlaw" Federal League (1914).
- May 10 – Rufus Meadows, 62, pitcher who faced only one batter (and retired him) in his only MLB game for the 1926 Cincinnati Reds.
- May 13
  - Urbane Pickering, 70, backup infielder who hit .257 with 11 home runs and 92 RBI for the Boston Red Sox in the 1921 and 1922 seasons.
  - Johnny Stuart, 69, pitcher who won 20 of 38 decisions for the 1922–1925 St. Louis Cardinals.
- May 15 – Ed Gerner, 72, left-handed pitcher who appeared in five games for the eventual world champion 1919 Cincinnati Reds.
- May 16 – Dutch Ruether, 76, southpaw pitcher who won opener of 1919 World Series for the world champion Cincinnati Reds after winning 19 games and posting the National League's best winning percentage (.760); won 137 MLB games for Chicago, Cincinnati and Brooklyn of the NL and Washington and New York of the American League, also contributing to three straight AL pennant-winners (1925 to 1927); member of the 1927 Yankees' World Series champions; later a scout for the New York/San Francisco Giants.
- May 19 – Ray Schalk, 77, Hall of Fame catcher for the Chicago White Sox who was noted for his defensive brilliance, setting records for career games, putouts and double plays at the position.
- May 21
  - Jack Farmer, 77, infielder-outfielder who played in 62 total games for the 1916 Pittsburgh Pirates and 1918 Cleveland Indians.
  - Les Fusselman, 49, catcher who played in 43 games for the 1952–1953 St. Louis Cardinals.
- May 24 – Bill Lamar, 73, outfielder for the New York Yankees, Boston Red Sox, Brooklyn Robins and Philadelphia Athletics (1917–1927), who collected a .310 average including a .356 in 1925.
- May 30 – Howie Gregory, 83, pitcher who made three appearances for the 1911 St. Louis Browns.
- May 31 – Zip Zabel, 79, Chicago Cubs pitcher who set a major league record for the most innings pitched in relief in a game (18 1/3) on June 17, 1915 against Brooklyn.

=== June ===
- June 1 – George Watkins, 69, outfielder for the St. Louis Cardinals, New York Giants, Philadelphia Phillies and Brooklyn Dodgers in the early 1930s, who owns the major league season-record for a rookie with a .373 batting average (1930).
- June 3
  - Forrest Mashaw, 72, outfielder for the 1920 Indianapolis ABCs of the Negro National League.
  - Jakie May, 74, relief pitcher for the St. Louis Cardinals, Cincinnati Reds and Chicago Cubs in 14 seasons spanning 1917–1932, who posted a 72–95 record with a 3.88 ERA and 19 saves in 1,562 innings of work.
- June 14 – Webbo Clarke, 42, Panamanian pitcher who played for the 1955 Washington Senators.
- June 23 – Ross Reynolds, 82, pitcher who posted a 5–4 record and a 2.62 ERA for the 1914–1915 Detroit Tigers.
- June 27 – Joe Atkins, 48, third baseman whose career included service in the Negro leagues (1944, 1946–1947, with the Newark Eagles, Pittsburgh Crawfords and Cleveland Buckeyes), racially integrated independent leagues (1948–1949, 1953), and "Organized Baseball's" minor leagues (1950–1952, 1954).

=== July ===
- July 1 – Herb Hall, 77, pitcher for the 1918 Detroit Tigers.
- July 3 – Walter Briggs Jr., 58, owner of the Tigers from 1952 to 1956 and general manager from July 1956 to April 1957; his father was co-owner or owner of the team from 1919 until his January 1952 death.
- July 7 – Harry Wolter, 85, outfielder and pitcher who played for the Cincinnati Reds, Pittsburgh Pirates, St. Louis Cardinals, Boston Red Sox, New York Highlanders/Yankees and Chicago Cubs.
- July 8 – Jimmy Grant, 51, third baseman who played from 1942 through 1944 for the Chicago White Sox and Cleveland Indians.
- July 9 – Giovanni Beale, 48, left-hander who hurled in two games for the 1947 Newark Eagles of the Negro National League.
- July 15 – Emilio Palmero, 75, Cuban pitcher who spent over 17 years in baseball, including stints with the New York Giants, St. Louis Browns, Washington Senators and Boston Braves during five seasons spanning 1915–1928.
- July 16 – Peahead Walker, 71, who had a distinguished minor league career as player and manager, and later became a prolific football coach with several collegiate squads as well as the CFL's Montreal Alouettes.
- July 24 – Harvey Green, 55, pitcher who played for the Brooklyn Dodgers in the 1935 season.
- July 25 – Herb Hunter, 74, utility player for the New York Giants, Chicago Cubs, Boston Red Sox and St. Louis Cardinals between 1916 and 1921.
- July 27
  - Jo Jo Deal, 45, slender outfielder — listed as 5 feet 11 inches (1.80 m) tall and 141 pounds (64 kg) — for 1948 Newark Eagles of the Negro National League.
  - Whitey Platt, 49, backup outfielder for the Chicago Cubs, Chicago White Sox and St. Louis Browns in five seasons between 1942 and 1949, who was a member of the 1938 United States national team in the inaugural Amateur World Series played in England, and also served with the US Navy in the Pacific Theatre of World War II.
- July 29 – Charley Moore, 85, infielder for the 1912 Chicago Cubs.
- July 31 – Jimmy Conzelman, 72, NFL star, head coach, and member of its Hall of Fame who spent three seasons (1943–1945) in baseball as an executive with the St. Louis Browns of the American League.

=== August ===
- August 2 – Mike Cvengros, 69, pitcher who played with the New York Giants, Chicago White Sox, Pittsburgh Pirates and Chicago Cubs in a span of six seasons from 1922 to 1929.
- August 11 – Paul Gillespie, 49, lefty-swinging catcher for the Chicago Cubs (1942, 1944–1945), who hit home runs in both his first and last regular-season MLB at-bats; appeared in three games of 1945 World Series.
- August 13 – Duke Cleveland, 53, outfielder for Cleveland, Jacksonville and Indianapolis of the Negro American League between 1938 and 1947; selected to the All-Star team in 1941.
- August 14 – Leon Ruffin, 58, catcher for three Negro National League clubs—primarily the Newark Eagles—between 1935 and 1946; selected as an All-Star in his final season.
- August 15 – Ray Bates, 80, third baseman for the Cleveland Naps (1913) and Philadelphia Athletics (1917).
- August 16 – Kurt Krieger, 43, pitcher in three games for the St. Louis Cardinals (1949, 1951); one of three Austrian-born players to appear in MLB.
- August 23
  - Doc Gautreau, 69, second baseman who played from 1925 to 1928 for the Philadelphia Athletics and Boston Braves; later a longtime scout.
  - Red Smith, 78, backup catcher for the Pittsburgh Pirates in the 1917 and 1918 seasons.
- August 25 – Leo Moon, 81, pitcher for the 1932 Cleveland Indians.
- August 26 – Eddie Rommel, 72, pitcher who won 171 games for the Philadelphia Athletics, and later worked 22 years as an American League umpire.
- August 31 – Heinie Odom, 69, third baseman who went straight from the University to Texas campus to the 1925 New York Yankees; played one game (on April 22), singled off Hall of Famer Walter Johnson in his only at bat, and played two errorless innings in the field in what would be his only MLB appearance.

=== September ===
- September 1 – Ben Spencer, 80, outfielder in eight games for the 1913 Washington Senators.
- September 2 – Herbert Hill, 79, who pitched two innings in his only MLB game for the 1915 Cleveland Indians.
- September 4 – Willie Gay, 61, outfielder for the 1929 Chicago American Giants of the Negro National League, where he played with his brother Herbert, a pitcher.
- September 7 – Gene Ford, 58, who pitched in five total games, one with the 1936 Brooklyn Dodgers and four for the 1938 Chicago White Sox.
- September 13 – Leon Riley, 64, longtime minor league outfielder and manager who appeared in four games for the 1944 Philadelphia Phillies; father of Pat Riley.
- September 14
  - Sam Lanford, 84, pitcher who worked in two games for the 1907 Washington Senators.
  - Jimmie Long, 72, catcher who had a three-game trial with the 1922 Chicago White Sox.
- September 15 – Blue Washington, 72, first baseman/outfielder/pitcher for the Chicago American Giants and Kansas City Monarchs (1916–1920) and prizefighter who became a prolific film actor in Hollywood; father of Kenny Washington.
- September 16 – Ray Shook, 80, catcher who appeared in one game as a pinch runner for the 1916 White Sox.
- September 17 – Ed Corey, 76, who pitched two innings in his only MLB game for the 1918 White Sox.
- September 19 – Dave Danforth, 80, pitcher who posted a 71–66 record with a 3.89 ERA from 1911 to 1925 for the Philadelphia Athletics, Chicago White Sox and St. Louis Browns.
- September 20
  - Oliver Hill, 60, minor-league infielder who got into two games as a pinch hitter for the 1939 Boston Bees.
  - Fred Lamlein, 83, pitcher in five MLB games, one for the 1912 Chicago White Sox and four for the 1915 St. Louis Cardinals.
- September 21 – Biggs Wehde, 63, pitcher who worked in 12 games for the 1930–1931 White Sox.
- September 26 – Art Hancock, 65, pitcher for the 1926 Cleveland Elites of the Negro National League.
- September 27 – Herman Bell, 55, All-Star catcher for the Toledo/Indianapolis Crawfords (1940) and Birmingham Black Barons (1943, 1945–1948) of the Negro American League; World War II veteran who worked in the steel mills during off-seasons.
- September 30
  - Lou Novikoff, 54, outfielder who played in 356 games for the Chicago Cubs (1941–1944) and Philadelphia Phillies (1946); in the minors, a career .337 hitter in over 1,600 games who was elected to Pacific Coast League Hall of Fame.
  - Hank Patterson, 63, catcher for the 1932 Boston Red Sox.

=== October ===
- October 2 – George Mohart, 78, pitcher who played in 15 games for the 1920–1921 Brooklyn Robins.
- October 5 – Reuben Ewing, 70, who appeared in three games for the 1921 St. Louis Cardinals as a pinch hitter, pinch runner and shortstop.
- October 9 – Cy Fried, 73, pitcher in two games for 1920 Detroit Tigers.
- October 10 – Lefty Leifield, 87, pitcher who averaged 17 wins for the Pittsburgh Pirates from 1906 to 1911, including a career-high 20 wins in 1907.
- October 13 – Fred Mitchell, 92, Hall of Fame manager who won the 1918 National League pennant with the Chicago Cubs, and also was coach at Harvard University for 30 years.
- October 22
  - Cal Dorsett, 57, pitcher in eight games over three trials with the Cleveland Indians (1940–1941, 1947).
  - Billy Sianis, 70[?], Chicago tavern owner who took his pet goat to Game 4 of the 1945 World Series between the Chicago Cubs and Detroit Tigers; according to Cubs' lore, when he and his goat were ejected from Wrigley Field, he put an alleged "curse" on the team that would last until 2016.
- October 23 – Sherry Robertson, 51, Canadian-born outfielder–infielder for ten seasons spanning 1940 to 1952 for the Washington Senators and Philadelphia Athletics who later became a Minnesota Twins executive; brother of Calvin Griffith.
- October 24 – Andy Oyler, 90, infielder–outfielder in 27 games for the 1902 Baltimore Orioles.
- October 26 – Willie Underhill, 66, pitcher who worked in 15 games for the 1927–1928 Cleveland Indians.
- October 28 – Wedo Martini, 57, pitcher in three games for the 1935 Philadelphia Athletics.
- October 30 – Jimmy Welsh, 68, outfielder who batted .290 with 778 hits over six seasons (1925–1930) as a member of the Boston Braves and New York Giants.
- October 31 – Johnny Lucas, 67, outfielder for the Boston Red Sox from 1931 to 1932.

=== November ===
- November 2 – Bobby LaMotte, 72, shortstop and third baseman who appeared in 223 games for the Washington Senators (1920–1922) and St. Louis Browns (1925–1926).
- November 3 – Red Kellett, 61, infielder who played in nine games for the 1934 Boston Red Sox.
- November 5
  - Dave Robertson, 89, outfielder who appeared in 804 games between 1912 and 1922 for the New York Giants, Chicago Cubs and Pittsburgh Pirates, who twice (1916–1917) led the National League in home runs.
  - Charlie Root, 71, pitcher who won a club-record 201 games for the Chicago Cubs, best known as the pitcher that surrendered Babe Ruth's supposed "called shot" in the 1932 World Series.
  - Freddy Spurgeon, 69, second baseman and third baseman who played in 316 games for the 1924–1927 Cleveland Indians.
- November 7
  - Johnny Hudson, 58, infielder who appeared in 426 games for the Brooklyn Dodgers (1936–1940), Chicago Cubs (1941) and New York Giants (1945).
  - Paul McCullough, 72, relief pitcher who worked in three games for the 1929 Washington Senators.
- November 8 – Ed Murray, 75, shortstop who played two innings of one game with the 1917 St. Louis Browns.
- November 9 – Howard Maple, 67, left-handed-hitting catcher and pinch hitter who appeared in 44 games for the 1932 Washington Senators.
- November 24
  - Spencer Adams, infielder who was in 180 games (1923, 1925–1927) for the Pittsburgh Pirates, New York Yankees, Washington Senators and St. Louis Browns.
  - Ivy Andrews, 63, pitcher for three American League teams from 1931 to 1938 and a member of the New York Yankees 1932 World Champions, who later became the first pitching coach for the Double-A Birmingham Barons.
- November 25 – Gerald Nugent, 78, president and majority owner of the Philadelphia Phillies from 1932 to 1942.
- November 28 – Orlie Weaver, 84, pitcher who won six games and lost 15 in 40 appearances for the Chicago Cubs (1910–1911) and Boston Rustlers, soon to be the "Braves" (1911).

=== December ===
- December 5 – Joe Wyatt, 70, right fielder who played in four games for the 1924 Cleveland Indians,
- December 10
  - Marshall Renfroe, 34, left-handed pitcher who appeared in one game for the 1959 San Francisco Giants.
  - Johnny Mostil, 74, center fielder for the Chicago White Sox (1918; 1921–1929) who appeared in 972 games, made 1,054 career hits, batted .301 lifetime, and twice (1925 and 1926) led the American League in stolen bases.
- December 12 – Doug Taitt, 68, right fielder for the Boston Red Sox, Chicago White Sox and Philadelphia Phillies from 1928 to 1932, who later became a successful hitter and manager in the Minor Leagues.
- December 13
  - George Baumgardner, 79, pitcher who compiled a 38–49 (3.22) record in 124 games for the 1912–1916 St. Louis Browns.
  - Chick Gandil, 83, first baseman for the Chicago White Sox (1910; 1917–1919), Washington Senators (1912–1915) and Cleveland Indians (1916), and the reported ringleader among the eight "Black Sox" players who threw the 1919 World Series.
- December 14
  - Herman Hill, 25, St. Louis Cardinals outfielder and former member (43 games) of the 1969–1970 Minnesota Twins; a drowning victim in Venezuela, where he was playing winter baseball.
  - Walt Tragesser, 83, catcher who appeared in 272 games (1913; 1915–1920) for the Boston Braves and Philadelphia Phillies.
- December 16 – Jim Winford, 61, pitcher who played in 68 games from 1932 to 1938 for the St. Louis Cardinals and Brooklyn Dodgers.
- December 17 – Jim Park, 78, pitcher who worked in 42 games for the 1915–1917 St. Louis Browns.
- December 19
  - Charlie "Swamp Baby" Wilson, 65, shortstop and third baseman in 57 career games for the Boston Braves (1931) and St. Louis Cardinals (1933–1935).
  - Nap Rucker, 86, who went 134–134 (2.42) in 336 career games (including 22 wins in 1911) between 1907 and 1916 for Brooklyn of the National League; during his decade with the team, it went through three nicknames: Superbas, Dodgers and Robins.
- December 21 – Chubby Dean, 55, who appeared in 533 games in MLB as a pitcher, pinch hitter and third baseman for the Philadelphia Athletics and Cleveland Indians between 1936 and 1943.
- December 25 – Red Juelich, 54, second baseman and third baseman in 17 games for the 1939 Pittsburgh Pirates.
- December 26 – Jack Stansbury, 85, third baseman and center fielder who got into 21 games for 1918's eventual world champion Boston Red Sox.
- December 28 – Doc Ozmer, 69, pitcher who worked two innings of only one big-league game as a member of the 1923 Philadelphia Athletics.
