= Ray Jarvis =

Ray Jarvis may refer to:

- Ray Jarvis (American football) (1949–2026), American football wide receiver in the NFL
- Ray Jarvis (baseball) (1946–2020), American Major League Baseball pitcher
