= 1970 Big League World Series =

Tournament details
- Country: United States
- City: Fort Lauderdale, Florida
- Dates: 17–22 August 1970
- Teams: 8

Final positions
- Champions: Lincolnwood, Illinois
- Runner-up: San Fernando/Simi Valley, California

The 1970 Big League World Series took place from August 17–22 in Fort Lauderdale, Florida, United States. Lincolnwood, Illinois defeated San Fernando/Simi Valley, California twice in the championship game. This was the first BLWS held in Fort Lauderdale.

This year marked the first appearance for the European, and Latin American regions.

== Teams ==
United States	International
(Florida) Fort Lauderdale, Florida Host	Thunder Bay, Ontario; Fort William; Canada
(New York (state)) New Hyde Park, New York East	(West Germany) Rhineland-Palatinate, West Germany; Ramstein Air Base; Europe
(Illinois) Lincolnwood, Illinois North	(Puerto Rico) San Juan, Puerto Rico Latin America
(West Virginia) Charleston, West Virginia; Charleston East; South	
(California) San Fernando/Simi Valley, California; North Valleys; West

== Results ==
Upper round 1	Upper round 2	Upper final	Championship
—	(New York (state)) New York	5
—	West Virginia (F/9)	6
1–0	Illinois	10
1–0	West Virginia	5
—	Illinois	9
—	West Germany	0
2–0	Illinois	2
2–0	California	4
—	Puerto Rico	1
—	California	3
1–0	California	6
1–0	Florida	0
—	Florida
—	Canada	3–0	California	0	5
3–1	Illinois	6	10
Lower round 1	Lower round 2	Lower round 3	Lower final
1–1	West Virginia	1
0–1	(New York (state)) New York	17	1–1	(New York (state)) New York	4	2–1	Illinois	8
0–1	West Germany	3	2–1	(New York (state)) New York	5	3–1	(New York (state)) New York	5
2–1	Puerto Rico	3
1–1	Florida	1
0–1	Puerto Rico	7	1–1	Puerto Rico	3
0–1	Canada	0

1970 Big League World Series Champions
Lincolnwood, Illinois
