= Jerry May (baseball) =

American baseball player (1943–1996)

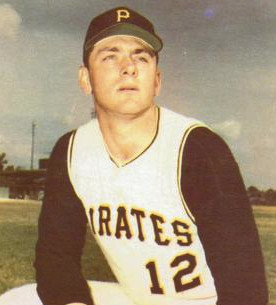
- May in 1966
- Catcher
- Born: December 14, 1943; Staunton, Virginia, U.S.
- Died: June 30, 1996 (aged 52); Swoope, Virginia, U.S.
- Batted: Right Threw: Right

MLB debut
- September 19, 1964, for the Pittsburgh Pirates

Last MLB appearance
- June 3, 1973, for the New York Mets

MLB statistics
- Batting average: .234
- Home runs: 15
- Runs batted in: 130
- Stats at Baseball Reference

Teams
- Pittsburgh Pirates (1964–1970); Kansas City Royals (1971–1973); New York Mets (1973)

Jerry Lee May (December 14, 1943 – June 30, 1996) was an American professional baseball player. He played as a catcher in Major League Baseball (MLB) from 1964 through 1973 for the Pittsburgh Pirates, Kansas City Royals, and New York Mets. May was notable for his defensive skills and ability to handle a pitching staff.

== Baseball career ==
Originally a pitcher and an outfielder, May threw six no hitters in American Legion Baseball. In 1961, he was contracted as an amateur free agent by the Pittsburgh Pirates, who converted him to a catcher. The scout who signed him for the Pirates organization was Syd Thrift, who would later serve as general manager of the Pirates and Baltimore Orioles.

May began his playing career as a reserve catcher to Jim Pagliaroni, before becoming the Pirates' regular catcher from 1967 to 1969. May was the Pirates' catcher on June 12, 1970, when pitcher Dock Ellis threw a no-hitter against the San Diego Padres. By the 1969 season, Manny Sanguillén had taken over as the Pirates' regular catcher. May was traded along with Freddie Patek and Bruce Dal Canton from the Pirates to the Royals for Jackie Hernández, Bob Johnson and Jim Campanis at the Winter Meetings on December 2, 1970.

== Career statistics ==
In a ten-year major league career, May played in 556 games, accumulating 357 hits in 1,527 at bats for a .234 career batting average along with 15 home runs, 130 runs batted in and a .307 on-base percentage. While May wasn't a strong hitter, he was valued for his defensive skills, posting a .990 fielding percentage over his career. He threw out 42.57% of the base runners who tried steal a base on him, ranking him 11th on the all-time list. May led National League catchers in 1970 with a 50% baserunners caught stealing percentage.

== Personal life and death ==
May was born in Virginia to Kit and Norine May and attended Augusta County's North River High School. He had a son and daughter from separate marriages. His daughter was born in 1995, just a year before he died.

May died in a farming accident where a tractor fell on him on June 30, 1996, at the age of 52.
