= Jarvis Tatum =

American baseball player (1946–2003)

- Center fielder
- Born: October 11, 1946; Fresno, California, U.S.
- Died: January 6, 2003 (aged 56); Los Angeles, California, U.S.
- Batted: Right Threw: Right

Professional debut
- MLB: September 7, 1968, for the California Angels
- NPB: April 30, 1971, for the Yakult Atoms

Last appearance
- MLB: October 1, 1970, for the California Angels
- NPB: August 1, 1971, for the Yakult Atoms

MLB statistics
- Batting average: .232
- Home runs: 0
- Runs batted in: 8

NPB statistics
- Batting average: .192
- Home runs: 1
- Runs batted in: 9
- Stats at Baseball Reference

Teams
- California Angels (1968–1970); Yakult Atoms (1971)

Jarvis Tatum (October 11, 1946 – January 6, 2003) was an American professional baseball player. A native of Fresno, California, he was an outfielder who threw and batted right-handed, stood 6 feet (1.8 m) tall and weighed 185 pounds (84 kg). Tatum appeared in 102 Major League Baseball games, primarily as a center fielder, over parts of three seasons for the California Angels (1968–1970).

Tatum was selected by the Angels in the 16th round of the 1965 Major League Baseball draft after graduating from Fresno's Edison High School. His first two partial seasons in MLB came in post-September-1 trials with the Angels, when rosters expanded to 40 players. But in 1970, Tatum spent all but 13 games on the Angels' American League roster. Getting into 75 games, with 44 starts in the outfield, he batted .238. However, he failed to hit for power (with only seven extra base hits, all doubles) and stole only one base. On October 11, 1970, the Angels packaged him with second baseman Doug Griffin and pitcher Ken Tatum (no relation) to the Boston Red Sox for slugging outfielder Tony Conigliaro, pitcher Ray Jarvis and catcher Gerry Moses. Jarvis Tatum never reported to the Red Sox; after getting his release from Boston in April 1971, he played for Yakult in the Japanese Central League for one year. He returned to the United States for a brief appearance at the Triple-A level in 1972 and the Mexican League in 1973.

As a big leaguer, Tatum batted .232 with 59 hits, 51 of them singles, and eight runs batted in. He died at age 56 in Los Angeles.
