= Jim Campanis =

American baseball player (born 1944)

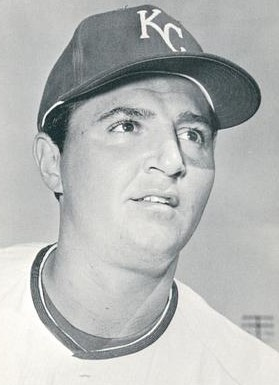
- Catcher
- Born: February 9, 1944 (age 82); New York City, U.S.
- Batted: Right Threw: Right

MLB debut
- September 20, 1966, for the Los Angeles Dodgers

Last MLB appearance
- October 1, 1973, for the Pittsburgh Pirates

MLB statistics
- Batting average: .147
- Home runs: 4
- Runs batted in: 9
- Stats at Baseball Reference

Teams
- Los Angeles Dodgers (1966–1968); Kansas City Royals (1969–1970); Pittsburgh Pirates (1973)

James Alexander Campanis (born February 9, 1944) is an American former professional baseball player who played in the Major Leagues primarily as a catcher from 1966 to 1970 and 1973. Campanis batted and threw right-handed. His father, Al Campanis, also played in the Majors.

Campanis played for the Dodgers from 1966–68. He was traded along with Jackie Hernández and Bob Johnson from the Kansas City Royals to the Pittsburgh Pirates for Freddie Patek, Bruce Dal Canton and Jerry May at the Winter Meetings on December 2, 1970. He was working for the team in 1988 when the Dodgers won the World Series.

Campanis also played winter baseball in the Mexican Pacific League with the Algodoneros de Guasave, Cañeros de Los Mochis and Yaquis de Obregón.

== See also ==
- List of second-generation Major League Baseball players
