= Freddie Patek =

American baseball player (born 1944)

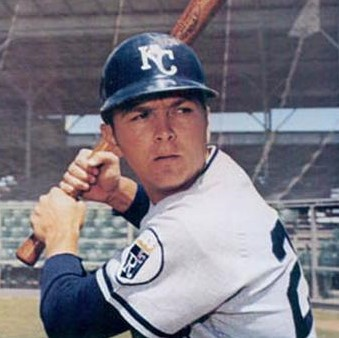
- Shortstop
- Born: October 9, 1944 (age 81); Oklahoma City, Oklahoma, U.S.
- Batted: Right Threw: Right

MLB debut
- June 3, 1968, for the Pittsburgh Pirates

Last MLB appearance
- October 3, 1981, for the California Angels

MLB statistics
- Batting average: .242
- Home runs: 41
- Runs batted in: 490
- Stolen bases: 385
- Stats at Baseball Reference

Teams
- Pittsburgh Pirates (1968–1970); Kansas City Royals (1971–1979); California Angels (1980–1981)

Career highlights and awards
- 3× All-Star (1972, 1976, 1978); AL stolen base leader (1977); Kansas City Royals Hall of Fame

Freddie Joseph Patek (/ˈpɑːtɛk/ PAH-tek; born October 9, 1944), nicknamed "the Flea" or "the Cricket", is an American former professional baseball shortstop who played in Major League Baseball (MLB) for the Pittsburgh Pirates, Kansas City Royals and California Angels. At 5 feet 5 inches (165 cm) tall, he was the shortest MLB player of his time.

== Career ==
=== Pittsburgh Pirates ===
Patek was drafted by the Pittsburgh Pirates in the 22nd round of the 1965 Major League Baseball draft out of Seguin High School in Seguin, Texas. He made his major league debut on June 3, 1968, against the Los Angeles Dodgers at shortstop, and played all but six of his 292 games with the Pirates at shortstop. However, with All-Star Gene Alley firmly entrenched at shortstop there was a desire on the part of management to convert him into a utility player.

=== Kansas City Royals ===
Patek was traded along with Bruce Dal Canton and Jerry May from the Pirates to the Royals for Jackie Hernández, Bob Johnson and Jim Campanis at the Winter Meetings on December 2, 1970. In his first season with the Royals, Patek hit for the cycle on July 9, 1971, and led the American League with 11 triples to finish sixth in A.L. M.V.P. balloting. He earned his first of three All-Star selections the following season, and was a staple of the Royals line-up that won the American League West from 1976 through 1978. He led the American League with 53 stolen bases in 1977. For 8 consecutive years, Patek posted 30 or more stolen bases and he led the American league in double plays turned 4 straight years. A memorable image was captured by NBC television of Patek sitting painfully alone in the Royals' empty dugout while the New York Yankees celebrated on-field their come-from-behind victory to win the last game of the 1977 American League Championship Series, played in Kansas City on Patek's 33rd birthday. The game and series ended when Patek grounded into a double play. He was the starting shortstop for the American League in the 1978 All-Star Game.

A durable player at shortstop, he ranks among the Royals all-time leaders in hits (1,076), walks (413), runs scored (571), stolen bases (336), and games played (1,245).

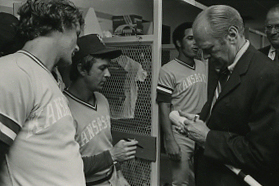
George Brett, Patek, Amos Otis, and President Gerald Ford in 1976

=== California Angels ===
Following the 1979 season, Patek signed as a free agent with the California Angels. He became the second shortstop, after Ernie Banks, to hit three home runs in a single game on June 20, 1980, against the Boston Red Sox at Fenway Park. In 1981, Patek was relegated to a utility role, actually seeing more playing time backing up Bobby Grich at second base than he did at short.

Patek retired after the 1981 season with a career batting average of .242 with 41 home runs and 490 runs batted in.

Patek was better known for his speed and his defensive abilities; former manager Whitey Herzog called Patek the best artificial turf shortstop he ever managed, ranking him even higher than Ozzie Smith. When asked by a reporter what it felt like to be the smallest player in the major leagues, Patek replied, "I'd rather be the smallest player in the majors than the tallest player in the minors." Although Patek played in four American League Championship Series, his teams never reached the World Series. The Pirates won the World Series the season after Patek left the Pirates (1971), and the Royals lost the World Series the season after Patek left the Royals (1980). Baseball analyst Bill James has ranked Patek, a member of the Kansas City Royals Hall of Fame, the 14th best player in Royals' history.

== Personal life ==
Patek briefly served as a part-time baseball analyst for NBC after his retirement. He was a color commentator for Texas Rangers games on television in 1985.

On July 21, 1992, Patek's daughter Kimberlie was paralyzed from the neck down in a car accident. Community fund raisers and charity events, and a donation from the Baseball Assistance Team, helped the family defray significant medical expenses. Kimberlie died on June 14, 1995.

== See also ==
- List of Major League Baseball players to hit for the cycle
- List of Major League Baseball career stolen bases leaders

Awards and achievements
Preceded by Jim Ray Hart	Hitting for the cycle July 9, 1971	Succeeded by Dave Kingman
Preceded by César Tovar	American League Triples Leader; 1971	Succeeded by Carlton Fisk & Joe Rudi
