= Herman Bell =

American baseball player (1915-1970)

- Catcher
- Born: April 18, 1915; Birmingham, Alabama, U.S.
- Died: September 27, 1970 (aged 55); Birmingham, Alabama, U.S.
- Batted: Right Threw: Right

Negro league baseball debut
- 1940, for the Indianapolis Crawfords

Last appearance
- 1950, for the Birmingham Black Barons
- Stats at Baseball Reference

Teams
- Indianapolis Crawfords (1940); Birmingham Black Barons (1943–1950)

Herman Bell (April 18, 1915 – September 27, 1970) was an American Negro league baseball catcher between 1940 and 1950.

A native of Birmingham, Alabama, Bell made his Negro leagues debut in 1940 with the Indianapolis Crawfords. He went on to play eight seasons with the Birmingham Black Barons, where he was selected to play in the 1949 East–West All-Star Game. Bell died in Birmingham in 1970 at age 55.
