= Bob Johnson (pitcher) =

American baseball player (born 1943)

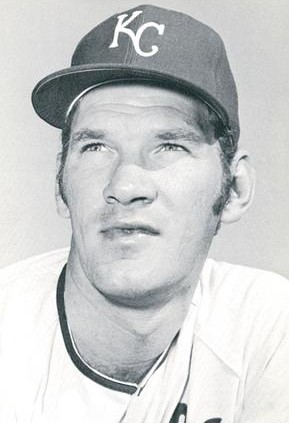
- Pitcher
- Born: April 25, 1943 (age 83); Aurora, Illinois, U.S.
- Batted: Left Threw: Right

MLB debut
- September 19, 1969, for the New York Mets

Last MLB appearance
- June 5, 1977, for the Atlanta Braves

MLB statistics
- Win–loss record: 28–34
- Earned run average: 3.48
- Strikeouts: 507
- Stats at Baseball Reference

Teams
- New York Mets (1969); Kansas City Royals (1970); Pittsburgh Pirates (1971–1973); Cleveland Indians (1974); Atlanta Braves (1977)

Career highlights and awards
- 2× World Series champion (1969, 1971)

Robert Dale Johnson (born April 25, 1943) is an American former professional baseball player. He was a pitcher over parts of seven seasons (1969–1974, 1977) with the New York Mets, Kansas City Royals, Pittsburgh Pirates, Cleveland Indians and Atlanta Braves. He batted left-handed and threw right-handed.

Johnson was traded along with Jackie Hernández and Jim Campanis from the Royals to the Pirates for Freddie Patek, Bruce Dal Canton and Jerry May at the Winter Meetings on December 2, 1970. He was a member of the 1971 World Series champion Pirates. The 1971 season was also his most productive, finishing 9–10 with a 3.45 ERA, including 27 starts, seven complete games and one shutout.

The Pirates faced the San Francisco Giants in the National League Championship Series that year, and with the 5-game series tied 1–1 after two games, Johnson started Game 3. He out-dueled Juan Marichal at Three Rivers Stadium, pitching eight innings and allowing only one unearned run for the win. The Pirates went on to win Game 4 to reach the World Series for the first time in 11 years. Johnson did not fare as well in the World Series, losing Game 2 at Memorial Stadium against the Baltimore Orioles.

An alumnus of Bradley University, for his career he compiled a 28–34 record with a 3.48 ERA and 507 strikeouts in 183 appearances, including 76 starts, 18 complete games, two shutouts, 12 saves and 692 1/3 innings pitched. He garnered 15 hits in 157 at-bats for an .096 lifetime batting average.
