= Jackie Hernández =

Cuban baseball player and coach (1940–2019)

Jackie Hernandez
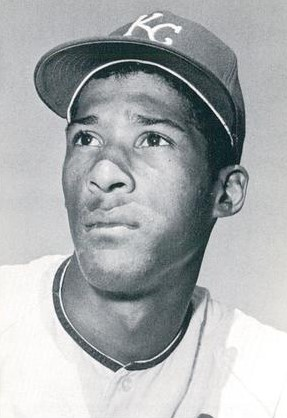
- Shortstop
- Born: September 11, 1940; Central Tinguaro, Perico, Cuba
- Died: October 12, 2019 (aged 79); Miami, Florida, U.S.
- Batted: Right Threw: Right

MLB debut
- September 14, 1965, for the California Angels

Last MLB appearance
- October 1, 1973, for the Pittsburgh Pirates

MLB statistics
- Batting average: .208
- Home runs: 12
- Runs batted in: 121
- Stats at Baseball Reference

Teams
- California Angels (1965–1966); Minnesota Twins (1967–1968); Kansas City Royals (1969–1970); Pittsburgh Pirates (1971–1973)

Career highlights and awards
- World Series champion (1971)

Jacinto Hernández Zulueta (September 11, 1940 – October 12, 2019) was a Cuban professional baseball player and coach. He played in Major League Baseball (MLB) as a shortstop and third baseman from 1965 to 1973, most notably as a member of the Pittsburgh Pirates teams that won two consecutive National League Eastern Division titles in 1971 and 1972, and won the 1971 World Series.

== Baseball career ==
Hernández began his professional baseball career with Almendares in the Cuban Winter League, spending the 1960-1961 season on that team's reserve list. When the Cuban government banned professional baseball after the end of the season, Almendares's general manager Monchy de Arcos, who was also a scout for the Cleveland Indians, helped Hernández secure a contract with the latter organization.

Hernández entered the Indians' farm system as a catcher, and in 1961, he caught Tommy John's first professional game while the two were with the Dubuque Packers. Later, Indians scout Hoot Evers suggested that Hernández's strong throwing arm would be better used at shortstop, and for the next several years Hernández worked to learn the infield. He was released by the Indians on May 15, 1965, and signed by the California Angels, who promoted him to the major leagues later that year at the age of 25. Hernández remained with the Angels until April 10, 1967, when he was chosen as the player to be named later in a December 2, 1966, deal that sent Dean Chance to the Minnesota Twins in exchange for Pete Cimino, Jimmie Hall, and Don Mincher. Hernández served as a utility infielder for the Twins in 1967 and 1968, but was left unprotected in the 1968 expansion draft, and the new Kansas City Royals chose him with the 43rd pick.

Hernández served as the Royals' everyday shortstop in their inaugural season, and received the plurality of the starts at that position in 1970, sharing time with Rich Severson and Tommy Matchick.

He was traded along with Bob Johnson and Jim Campanis from the Royals to the Pirates for Freddie Patek, Bruce Dal Canton and Jerry May at the Winter Meetings on December 2, 1970. Initially slated to play in a reserve role, Hernández became the Pirates' regular shortstop after Gene Alley sustained an injury. On September 1, 1971, Hernández was part of a notable milestone when, for the first time in baseball history, a team fielded a lineup that consisted entirely of African-American and Latino players. Orioles manager Earl Weaver memorably said that "The Pirates can’t win the pennant with Hernandez at shortstop," but Hernandez started all seven games in the 1971 World Series and committed no errors, even successfully handling Merv Rettenmund's ground ball for the final out of the Series.

Hernandez's role decreased in subsequent seasons, and the Pirates traded him to the Philadelphia Phillies for Mike Ryan in January 1974. Hernández never saw Major League action with the Phillies, however; he returned to the Pirates organization and played for their Triple-A team in 1974. He followed by playing in Mexico in 1975 and 1976.

After Hernández's retirement as a player, he remained involved with baseball as a coach, including a stint on the staff of the New Jersey Jackals in 2001. He died from cancer on October 12, 2019, at age 79.
