= Bruce Dal Canton =

American baseball player (1941–2008)

- Pitcher
- Born: June 15, 1941; California, Pennsylvania, U.S.
- Died: October 7, 2008 (aged 67); Pittsburgh, Pennsylvania, U.S.
- Batted: Right Threw: Right

MLB debut
- September 3, 1967, for the Pittsburgh Pirates

Last MLB appearance
- May 27, 1977, for the Chicago White Sox

MLB statistics
- Win–loss record: 51–49
- Earned run average: 3.67
- Strikeouts: 485
- Stats at Baseball Reference

Teams
- Pittsburgh Pirates (1967–1970); Kansas City Royals (1971–1975); Atlanta Braves (1975–1976); Chicago White Sox (1977)

John Bruce Dal Canton (June 15, 1941 – October 7, 2008) was an American Major League Baseball pitcher for the Pittsburgh Pirates (1967–70), Kansas City Royals (1971–75), Atlanta Braves (1975–76), and Chicago White Sox (1977).

== Career ==
Dal Canton's career path to the major leagues was unusual in that he was signed by the Pittsburgh Pirates as the result of an open tryout. Dal Canton was teaching high school at Burgettstown JR / SR high school in Burgettstown, Pennsylvania at the time of his signing. In eleven seasons he had a 51–49 win–loss record, 316 games (83 starts), 15 complete games, 2 shutouts, 102 games finished, 19 saves, 931.1 innings pitched, 894 hits allowed, 442 runs allowed, 380 earned runs allowed, 48 home runs allowed, 391 walks, 485 strikeouts, 23 hit batsmen, 46 wild pitches, 4,030 batters faced, 55 intentional walks, 5 balks, a 3.67 ERA and a 1.380 WHIP. He led the American League in wild pitches (16) in 1974.

Dal Canton was traded along with Freddie Patek and Jerry May from the Pirates to the Royals for Jackie Hernández, Bob Johnson and Jim Campanis at the Winter Meetings on December 2, 1970.

In 1982 he joined the Braves organization as a pitching instructor. He spent most of his time in the minor league system, acting as the pitching coach for the Double-A affiliate team, the Savannah Braves/Greenville Braves, and the Triple-A affiliate team, the Richmond Braves. After that, he became the team's major league pitching coach until 1991, when he returned to being the pitching coach for the Richmond Braves and the Greenville Braves. He spent one season with the shortly lived Single-A affiliate Danville 97s, and he followed them as they became the Myrtle Beach Pelicans, staying with the team through 2008.

Dal Canton threw a knuckleball which Wilbur Wood helped teach him.

== Death ==
Bruce Dal Canton died on October 7, 2008, in Pittsburgh, Pennsylvania, aged 67, of esophageal cancer.

== Legacy ==
On Friday, June 11, 2004, Dal Canton was inducted into the Pennsylvania Sports Hall of Fame. During Opening Day ceremonies on April 9, 2009, the Myrtle Beach Pelicans honored Bruce, who had been their pitching coach since 1999. The Pelicans' clubhouse was officially named in his memory and Dal Canton's number, 43, was retired. As well, the team introduced the Bruce Dal Canton Service Award, which would be given to "a player that has demonstrated significant contributions to the Grand Strand community, the Carolina League and the baseball industry as a whole." He was inducted into the California University of Pennsylvania Athletic Hall of Fame in 1995. The university introduced a similar award called the Bruce Dal Canton Pitching Award, which would be given to "a Vulcan pitcher who exemplifies greatness of character."

Dal Canton once threw a Perfect Game striking out every batter in a 7 inning high school game except for the shortstop who bunted and was thrown out at first.

Preceded by Johnny Sain	Atlanta Braves pitching coach 1987–1990	Succeeded by Leo Mazzone
