= Tony Conigliaro =

American baseball player (1945–1990)

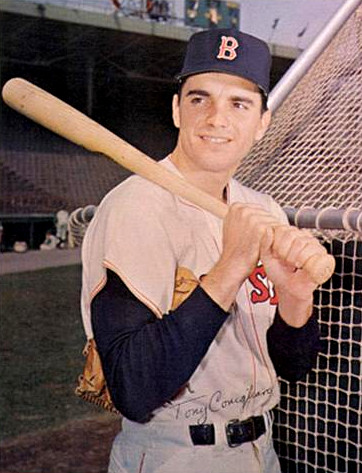
- Conigliaro in 1966
- Right fielder
- Born: January 7, 1945; Revere, Massachusetts, U.S.
- Died: February 24, 1990 (aged 45); Salem, Massachusetts, U.S.
- Batted: Right Threw: Right

MLB debut
- April 16, 1964, for the Boston Red Sox

Last MLB appearance
- June 12, 1975, for the Boston Red Sox

MLB statistics
- Batting average: .264
- Home runs: 166
- Runs batted in: 516
- Stats at Baseball Reference

Teams
- Boston Red Sox (1964–1967, 1969–1970); California Angels (1971); Boston Red Sox (1975)

Career highlights and awards
- All-Star (1967); AL home run leader (1965); Boston Red Sox Hall of Fame

Anthony Richard Conigliaro (January 7, 1945 – February 24, 1990), nicknamed "Tony C" and "Conig", was an American Major League Baseball (MLB) outfielder and right-handed batter who played for the Boston Red Sox (1964–1967, 1969–1970, 1975) and California Angels (1971). Born in Revere, Massachusetts, he was a 1962 graduate of St. Mary's High School in Lynn. Conigliaro started his MLB career as a teenager, hitting a home run in his first at-bat during his home field debut in 1964, and reaching 100 career home runs faster than any other player in American League history.

During the Red Sox "Impossible Dream" season of 1967, Conigliaro was hit in the face by a pitch that caused a severe eye injury and derailed his career. He did not play in 1968, but in 1969 he came back and had a good year with 20 home runs and 82 runs batted in. In 1970, Conigliaro had an even better year. He hit 36 home runs and knocked in 116 runs. Then, in 1971, the Red Sox sent him to the California Angels for reasons that were never explained. That 1971 season with the Angels was not a good one for Conigliaro and following that year he retired. After retirement from baseball, he had a heart attack and suffered brain damage at age 37, leaving him severely impaired until his death in 1990.

== Early life ==
Tony Conigliaro was born in Revere, Massachusetts, on January 7, 1945, and was raised in the Boston neighborhoods of Orient Heights and East Boston, and in the coastal towns of Swampscott and Nahant. He attended St. Mary's High School in Lynn, Massachusetts, where he played starting quarterback on the football team and starred in baseball. In 2020, the school retired Conigliaro's jersey number (12) and unveiled his portrait in the lobby of its Tony Conigliaro Gymnasium.

== Baseball career ==
Conigliaro was signed by the Boston Red Sox in 1962, at the age of 17, for $20,000. In 1963, he batted .363 with 24 home runs, and an on-base plus slugging (OPS) of 1.139, playing for the Wellsville Red Sox in the Single-A New York–Penn League. He was the league's Rookie-of-the-Year and its Most Valuable Player. In the fall of 1963, he played instructional league baseball in Sarasota, Florida, and was included on Boston's roster coming into spring training. At nineteen years old he made the team going into the 1964 season, without returning to the minor leagues.

During his rookie season, Conigliaro batted .290 with 24 home runs and 52 runs batted in (RBI) but played in only 111 games due to a broken arm from being hit by a pitch and further breaking some of his toes in August. On the first pitch of his first at-bat in Fenway Park, in the team's 1964 opening home game, Conigliaro hit a towering home run in the second inning against the Chicago White Sox. The proceeds of that game went to the John F. Kennedy Memorial Library, to honor the recently assassinated president, and those in attendance that day included among others Robert F. Kennedy, Ted Kennedy and Massachusetts Governor Endicott Peabody. (Conigliaro's first major league hit came a day earlier against the New York Yankees at Yankee Stadium.) His 24 home runs is the most in a season by a player before they turned 20.

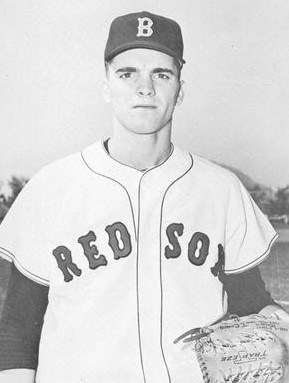
Conigliaro in 1965

In 1965, Conigliaro led the league in home runs (32), becoming the youngest home run champion in American League history. He batted .269, with 82 RBIs and 82 runs scored, and a .850 OPS. He suffered a cracked wrist from a pitched ball that year, but still played in 138 games. In 1966, he hit .265, with 28 home runs and 93 RBIs, playing in 150 games. During spring training in 1967, Conigliaro suffered a hairline arm fracture from a pitched ball. Through 95 games, he had 20 home runs in only 349 at-bats, while batting .287 with 67 RBIs, 59 runs scored and an .860 OPS. He was selected for the All-Star Game in 1967. In that season, at age 22, he not only reached a career total of 100 home runs, but attained that milestone at the youngest age for an American League player.

On August 18, 1967, in his 95th game of the season, the Red Sox were playing the California Angels at Fenway Park. Conigliaro, batting against Jack Hamilton, was hit by a pitch on his left cheekbone and was carried off the field on a stretcher. He sustained a linear fracture of the left cheekbone and a dislocated jaw with severe damage to his left retina. He was left with 20–300 vision and stabbing headaches. Those in attendance knew the injury was serious from the sound of the ball striking Conigliaro. The batting helmet he was wearing did not have the protective ear-flap that has since become standard partly due to this incident.

Conigliaro missed the remainder of the 1967 season and was unable to play at all in 1968 because of poor vision. In 1967, he was replaced in right field by José Tartabull and Ken Harrelson. The Red Sox reached the 1967 World Series, losing to the St. Louis Cardinals four games to three. During the World Series, Harrelson hit .077 in 13 at-bats, and Tartabull hit .154 in 13 at-bats. During the regular season, the two combined for only three home runs and 24 RBIs in 327 at-bats.

A year and a half later, in 1969, Conigliaro made a remarkable return, hitting 20 home runs with 82 RBIs in 141 games. He earned Comeback Player of the Year honors. In 1970, Conigliaro reached career-high numbers in home runs (36) and RBIs (116). He later said that he had batted most of that season with his left eye almost closed. That season, Conigliaro and his brother Billy formed two-thirds of the Red Sox outfield. Shortly after the season ended, on October 11, 1970, the Red Sox traded Conigliaro, Ray Jarvis and Jerry Moses to the California Angels for Ken Tatum, Jarvis Tatum and Doug Griffin. (In 1970, pitcher Tatum had hit the Orioles' Paul Blair in the face with a pitch that resulted in multiple fractures and the need for surgery.) There was controversy surrounding the surprising trade, with Tony's brother Billy blaming Carl Yastrzemski for the trade, seemingly in order to keep the left field job instead of being moved to first base. Reggie Smith was also involved in the situation.

Conigliaro's vision deteriorated in 1971, including a lack of depth perception and blind spots in his vision. He went on the disabled list in July, and formally retired from baseball at the end of the season, only twenty-six years old. In 1971, Conigliaro played in only 74 games, batting .222 with four home runs. In 1972 he opened a resort in Nahant. Conigliaro returned to the Red Sox briefly in 1975 as a designated hitter, hitting two home runs in 21 games, but was forced to retire because his eyesight had been permanently damaged. He played his final games for the Triple-A Pawtucket Red Sox of the International League.

Conigliaro in 1975

Conigliaro batted .267, with 162 home runs and 501 RBI during his 802-game Red Sox career. With the Angels, he hit .222 with 4 home runs and 15 RBIs in 74 games. He is the second-youngest player to hit his 100th homer (after Mel Ott) and the youngest American League player to do so.

== Final years and death ==
After his retirement, in the fall of 1975, Conigliaro opened a restaurant in Providence, Rhode Island, managed by his brother Billy. In September of that same year, he was hired by Providence-area NBC affiliate WJAR as a sports anchor. In August 1976, he moved to a similar position at KGO-TV Channel 7 in San Francisco, and won an Emmy Award. He had also owned a health food store in California.

On January 9, 1982, then 37-year-old Conigliaro was in Boston to interview for a broadcasting position when he suffered a heart attack while being driven to the airport by his brother Billy. Shortly thereafter, he suffered a stroke and lapsed into a coma. Conigliaro never fully recovered, having suffered slight brain damage due to the stroke. Conigliaro's parents and brothers cared for him closely during his final eight years, during which time he was bedridden, unable to walk and barely able to speak. He remained severely limited until his death February 24, 1990, at the age of 45, from pneumonia and kidney failure. In commemoration, the Red Sox wore black armbands that season. Conigliaro is interred at Holy Cross Cemetery in Malden, Massachusetts.

During 1982, Oakland Raiders owner Al Davis, whose wife had come out of a coma three years earlier, visited Conigliaro to try and give him some optimism. In 1983, when insurance funds were running low to cover Conigliaro's medical care, teammates and others stepped in to raise money to aid Conigliaro and the family. In one April fundraising event at Boston's Symphony Hall, Frank Sinatra, Dionne Warwick, Ted Williams, Joe DiMaggio and Willie Mays were among those raising money to support Conigliaro ($230,000). Conigliaro, who once had a modest singing career, had recorded a song with Warwick in 1976. He had also performed on The Merv Griffin Show a number of times.

== Legacy ==
Since 1990, the Tony Conigliaro Award, instituted by the Red Sox after his death, is given annually to the MLB player who best overcomes obstacles and adversities through the attributes of spirit, determination and courage that were considered Conigliaro's trademarks. While the tragedy of his life is well recorded, others have also tried to find inspiring aspects in his determination to overcome obstacles and reinvent himself.

=== Conigliaro's Corner ===
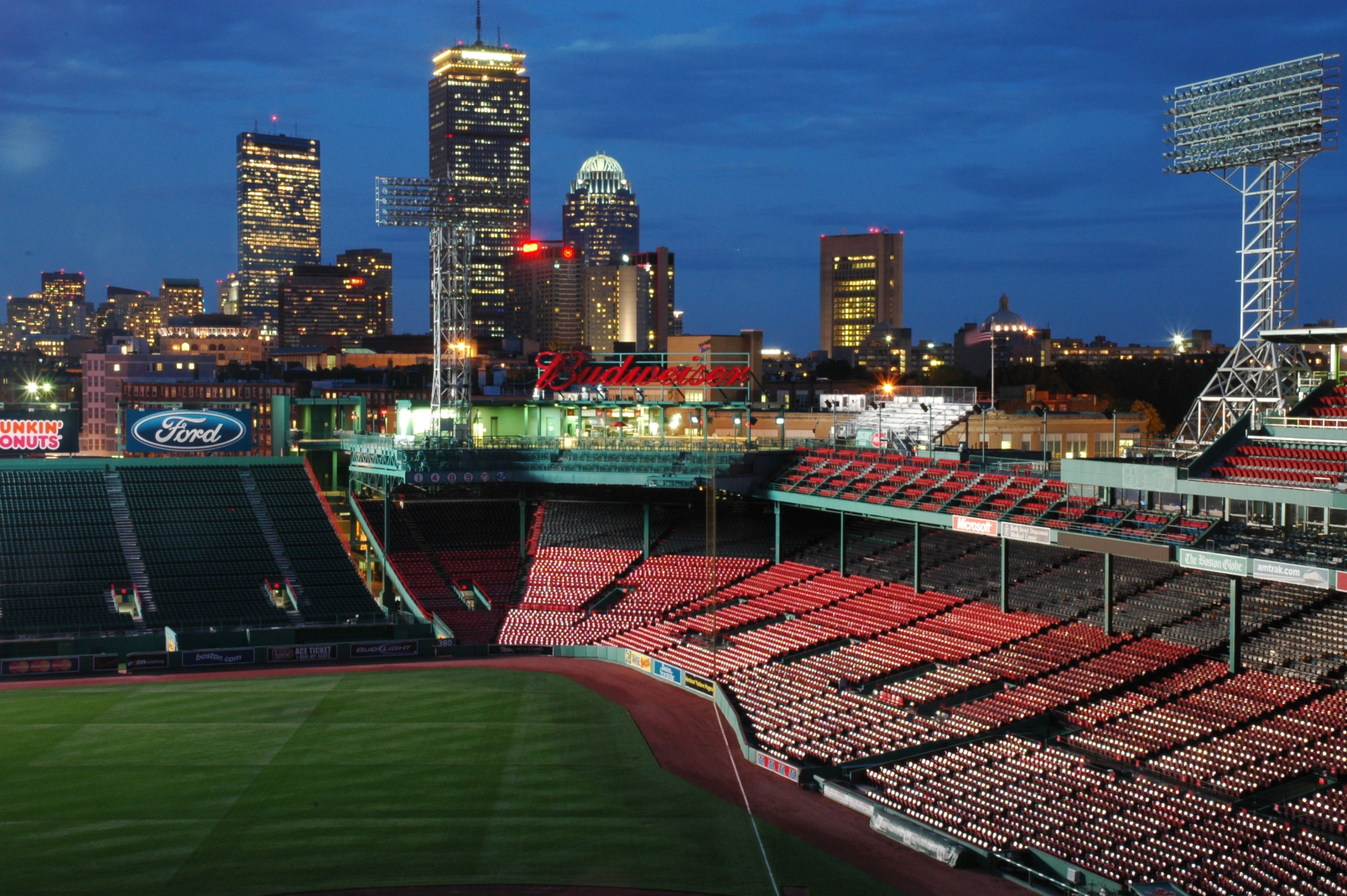
Conigliaro's Corner bleacher seating (silver) can be seen to the right of the Budweiser sign in this July 2008 photo.

For the start of the 2007 season, Red Sox ownership added a new 200-seat bleacher section on the right field roof, providing an additional 200 available tickets for the season. It was named "Conigliaro's Corner" in honor of Conigliaro. The seats were being marketed specifically towards families. As of May 2007, the section was reserved for Red Sox Nation members on Saturdays and Red Sox Kid Nation members on Sundays. The seats were removed prior to the start of the 2009 season.

== Works cited ==
- Conigliaro, Tony (August 1970). Seeing It Through. with Jack Zanger. Macmillan. ISBN 978-0025272903.

== See also ==
- Boston Red Sox Hall of Fame
- List of Major League Baseball annual home run leaders
