= Ray Jarvis (baseball) =

American baseball player (1946–2020)

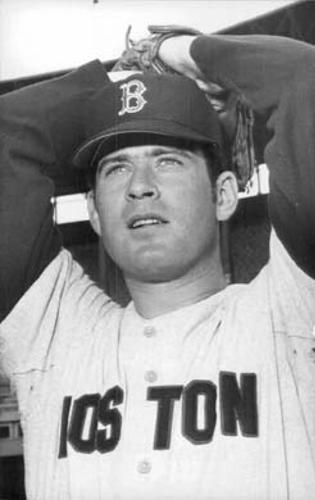
- Pitcher
- Born: 10 May 1946; Providence, Rhode Island, U.S.
- Died: 24 April 2020 (aged 73); Austin, Texas, U.S.
- Batted: Right Threw: Right

MLB debut
- April 15, 1969, for the Boston Red Sox

Last MLB appearance
- September 13, 1970, for the Boston Red Sox

MLB statistics
- Win–loss record: 5–7
- Earned run average: 4.64
- Strikeouts: 44
- Stats at Baseball Reference

Teams
- Boston Red Sox (1969–1970)

Raymond Arnold Jarvis (May 10, 1946 – April 24, 2020) was an American professional baseball player. The right-handed pitcher appeared in 44 total games, including five starting assignments, in Major League Baseball for the Boston Red Sox (1969–1970). He was listed as 6 feet 2 inches (1.88 m) tall and 198 pounds (90 kg).

== Amateur career ==
Jarvis was born in Providence, Rhode Island, where he graduated from Hope High School. While in high school, he had spent the summer of 1964 pitching against collegiate competition for the Chatham A's of the Cape Cod Baseball League.

== Professional career ==
Boston drafted Jarvis in the eighteenth round of the 1965 amateur draft where he entered their farm system that season in the Rookie-level Appalachian League.

After he made the varsity in the spring of 1969, Jarvis pitched over one hundred innings for the Red Sox during his two seasons with them, posting a 5–7 won–lost mark and a 4.64 earned run average, with two complete games and one save. In 1161/3 innings pitched, he allowed 122 hits and 57 bases on balls, with 44 strikeouts.

On October 11, 1970, Jarvis was traded in a blockbuster deal to the California Angels with Tony Conigliaro and Jerry Moses for Doug Griffin, Ken Tatum and Jarvis Tatum. However he never pitched for the Angels, spending 1971 at Triple–A before leaving the game.

== Death ==
Jarvis died on April 24, 2020, due to complications from multiple myeloma. He is survived by two children and his younger brother.
