= Ken Tatum =

American baseball player (born 1944)

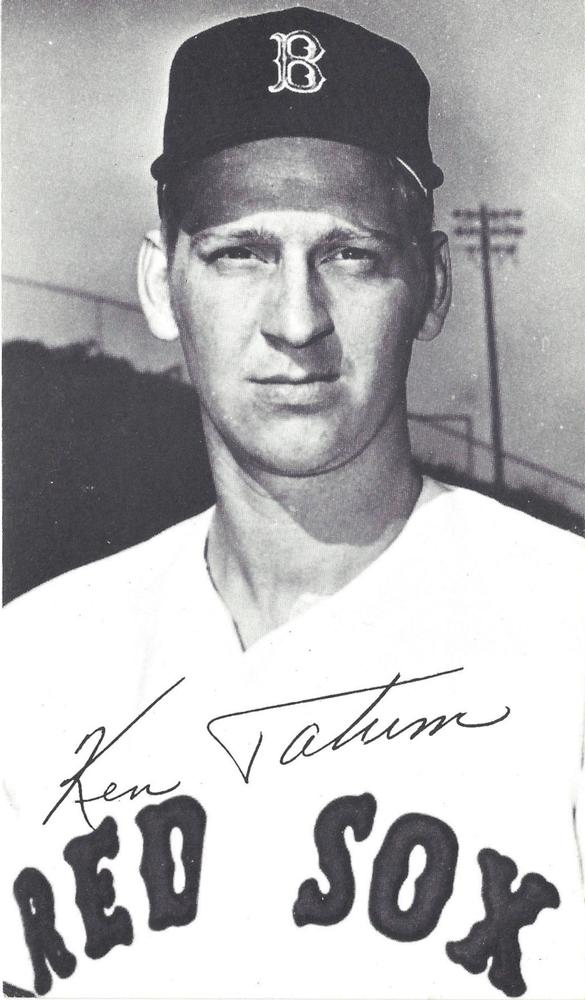
- Relief pitcher
- Born: April 25, 1944 (age 82); Alexandria, Louisiana, U.S.
- Batted: Right Threw: Right

MLB debut
- May 28, 1969, for the California Angels

Last MLB appearance
- July 1, 1974, for the Chicago White Sox

MLB statistics
- Win–loss record: 16–12
- Earned run average: 2.93
- Strikeouts: 156
- Saves: 52
- Stats at Baseball Reference

Teams
- California Angels (1969–1970); Boston Red Sox (1971–1973); Chicago White Sox (1974)

Kenneth Ray Tatum (born April 25, 1944) is an American former professional baseball player. A right-handed relief pitcher, he appeared in 176 games pitched (all but two in a bullpen role) over six seasons (1969–1974) for the California Angels, Boston Red Sox and Chicago White Sox of Major League Baseball. The native of Alexandria, Louisiana, attended Mississippi State University. He was listed at 6 feet 2 inches (1.88 m) tall and 205 pounds (93 kg).

== Playing career ==
=== Stellar MLB debut ===
Tatum's professional career began when he signed with the Angels in 1966 after he was selected in the second round of the secondary phase of the 1966 Major League Baseball draft. In his fourth minor league season, in 1969, he was converted from a starting pitcher to a relief role, and he was recalled by the Angels in May. He quickly established himself as the team's top short reliever—the term "closer" was not then in use. By the end of July, he had amassed seven saves and three wins in relief, with an earned run average of 0.95 in 21 games. He finished the year with a win–loss record of 7–2, 22 saves, and an earned run average of 1.36 in 45 games pitched. He placed fourth in American League Rookie of the Year balloting.

Tatum began 1970 with another skein of excellent relief pitching. During the season's first two months, he appeared in 20 games, won two of three decisions, netted eight saves, and posted a 1.00 ERA in 27 innings pitched. But in the eighth inning of his 20th appearance on May 31, while he was in the process of notching a four-inning save in a 6–1 victory over the Baltimore Orioles at Anaheim Stadium, Tatum threw a pitch that hit the Orioles' Paul Blair in the face. Blair sustained a broken nose, orbital floor fractures below his left eye and a broken cheekbone, and he missed three weeks of action; his vision, however, was not affected. He remained the Orioles' regular center fielder through 1976 and retired from the Majors during the 1980 campaign. The beaning was unintentional, as Tatum had grazed the jersey front of the previous batter Boog Powell.

=== Decline after Blair beanball ===
But the incident may have been a turning point that ruined Tatum's career. Affected by Blair's traumatic injury, he became reluctant to pitch inside. By August 1, his earned run average had risen by two full points to 3.00 and it would climb as high as 3.30 on August 30 before he was able to string together enough effective appearances to lower it to 2.94 at season's end. For the year, he went 7–4 with 17 saves in 62 games. Wrote Peter Gammons in 2013: "After [Tatum] retired, he admitted he pitched with the fear 'that I might kill someone. I could never pitch on the inside half of the plate again.'"

Ten days after the 1970 season ended, the Angels traded Tatum to the Red Sox in a six-player swap that brought slugger Tony Conigliaro to Anaheim. (Ironically, Conigliaro's career was curtailed by the after-effects of a beanball in a game between the Red Sox and Angels on August 18, 1967.) But Tatum was ineffective in Boston. In his first game, on April 8, 1971, he blew a 2–1 ninth-inning lead for Sonny Siebert and lost to the Cleveland Indians on a walk-off single to Gomer Hodge. Tatum recovered to pitch well over his next 16 games, but on May 23, he was injured by a line drive to the face during batting practice. Coincidentally, he fractured his cheekbone, and the injury occurred in Baltimore, with Blair still an Oriole stalwart. Tatum would miss a full month of action, and his pitching suffered. He ended the season having worked in only 36 games, with a 2–4 record, 4.09 earned run average and only nine saves.

Troubled by a nerve problem in his back and leg, he would appear in only 22 games in 1972, and spend most of 1973 in the minor leagues. He was dealt along with Reggie Smith from the Red Sox to the St. Louis Cardinals for Bernie Carbo and Rick Wise on October 26, 1973. After spending the spring training of 1974 with the Redbirds, he was traded again in April, to the White Sox, where he got into ten games. He retired at the close of that season.

All told, Tatum compiled a 16–12 record in the big leagues with 52 saves and a career ERA of 2.93. He allowed 230 hits and 117 bases on balls in 2822/3 innings pitched, with 156 strikeouts.
