= 1996 Caribbean Series =

1996 baseball tournament

The thirty-eighth edition of the Caribbean Series (Serie del Caribe) was held from February 3 through February 8 of 1996 with the champion baseball teams of the Dominican Republic, Águilas Cibaeñas; Mexico, Tomateros de Culiacán; Puerto Rico, Lobos de Arecibo, and Venezuela, Navegantes del Magallanes. The format consisted of 12 games, each team facing the other teams twice, and the games were played at Estadio Quisqueya in Santo Domingo, Dominican Republic.

== Final standings ==
Country	Club	W	L	W/L %	Managers
Mexico	Tomateros de Culiacán	5	1	.833	Francisco Estrada
Puerto Rico	Lobos de Arecibo	4	2	.667	Pat Kelly
Dominican Republic	Águilas Cibaeñas	2	4	.333	Terry Francona
Venezuela	Navegantes del Magallanes	1	5	.167	Gregorio Machado

== Individual leaders ==
Player	Statistic
Batting
Tony Barron (PUR)	Batting average	.500
Tony Barron (PUR); Bernie Williams (PUR)	Runs	6
Tony Barron (PUR)	Hits	12
Six tied	Doubles	2
Tony Barron (PUR)	Triples	2
Leo Gómez (PUR)	Home runs	3
Leo Gómez (PUR)	RBI	9
Moisés Alou (DOM)	Stolen bases	3
Pitching
Felipe Murillo (MEX)	Wins	2
Robert Toth (PUR)	Strikeouts	9
Robinson Checo (DOM); Pedro Martínez (DOM)	ERA	0.00
Ramón García (VEN); Esteban Loaiza (MEX)	Innings pitched	10.0
Three tied	Saves	1

== All-Star team ==
Name	Position
Iván Rodríguez (PUR)	Catcher
Julio Franco (DOM)	First baseman
Ever Magallanes (MEX)	Second baseman
Leo Gómez (PUR)	Third baseman
José Vizcaíno (DOM)	Shortstop
Darryl Brinkley (MEX)	Left fielder
Bernie Williams (PUR)	Center fielder
Antonio Aguilera (MEX)	Right fielder
Tony Barron (PUR)	Designated hitter
Robinson Checo (DOM)	Right-handed pitcher
Yorkis Pérez (DOM)	Left-handed pitcher
Awards
Darryl Brinkley (MEX)	Most Valuable Player
Francisco Estrada (MEX)	Manager

== Sources ==
- Nuñez, José Antero (1994). Serie del Caribe de la Habana a Puerto La Cruz. JAN Editor. ISBN 980-07-2389-7
