= 1994 Caribbean Series =

1994 baseball tournament

The thirty-sixth edition of the Caribbean Series (Serie del Caribe) was held from February 4 through February 9 of 1994 with the champion baseball teams of the Dominican Republic, Tigres del Licey; Mexico, Naranjeros de Hermosillo; Puerto Rico, Senadores de San Juan, and Venezuela, Navegantes del Magallanes. The format consisted of 12 games, each team facing the other teams twice, and the games were played at Estadio Alfonso Chico Carrasquel in Puerto la Cruz, Venezuela.

== Summary ==
The Caribbean Series returned to Venezuela after seven years of absence. The Tigres del Licey club, managed by Casey Parsons, finished with a 5–1 record to obtain its seventh title in the Series and the ninth overall for the Dominican Republic since its inception in 1970. The pitching staff allowed only four earned runs in their first four games while winning five games in a row before losing a meaningless last contest. The offense was paced by first baseman Jim Bowie, who hit .444 (8-for-20) with three home runs and 11 runs batted in to claim Most Valuable Players honors. Meanwhile, outfielder Raúl Mondesí hit .450 (9-for-20) to win the batting title, while driving in six runs and scoring six times. The pitching rotation went 4–0 with a 1.00 ERA, and was led by Pedro Astacio (1-0, 0.00) and Julián Tavárez (1-0, 1.23). The team also featured pitchers Pedro Martínez, Yorkis Pérez and Efraín Valdez; catcher Gilberto Reyes and outfielder Bernardo Brito, as well as infielders Alex Arias, Juan Bell, Juan Guerrero, Francisco Matos, Junior Noboa and Henry Rodríguez, among others.

The host Navegantes del Magallanes of Venezuela, guided by Tim Tolman, ended in second place with a 4–2 mark. James Waring posted a 2–0 record and allowed only five hits in 13 innings of shutout ball, to lead all pitchers in ERA (0.00) and innings while tying for the most wins. DH Raúl Marcano hit .364 (8-for-22) and slugged .500, including five runs and five RBI, to command the offense of the team. Other contributions came from Bobby Abreu, Wilson Álvarez, Oscar Azócar, Alvaro Espinoza, Jason Grimsley, John Hudek, Juan Carlos Pulido and Luis Raven.

The Senadores de San Juan went 3–3 to finish in third place. With Luis Meléndez at the helm, the representing team of Puerto Rico received a fine pitching performance from Tom McCarthy (2-0, 1.29 ERA, two starts) and José Alberro (0.00, six innings). Their most productive hitters were Carlos Baerga, with a team-best average of .391 (9-for-23), and Carlos Delgado, who batted .364 and slugged .864, including three homers, seven RBI and six runs.

The hapless Naranjeros de Hermosillo of Mexico were managed by Marv Foley and ended with a 0–6 record. Besides first baseman Matt Franco (.348, .522 SLG) and pitcher Blaise Ilsley (1.29 ERA), the club was overmatched by its opponents from the start of the tournament, becoming the third winless team in Series history, as they joined the Coclé BBC from Panama (1959) and their fellow team Tomateros de Culiacán (1983). Also on the roster were Matías Carrillo, Narciso Elvira, Howard Farmer, Donald Harris, Marcus Moore, Antonio Osuna, Vicente Palacios, Tony Perezchica, Homar Rojas and Ed Vosberg.

== Final standings ==
Country	Club	W	L	W/L %	Managers
Dominican Republic	Tigres del Licey	5	1	.833	Casey Parsons
Venezuela	Navegantes del Magallanes	4	2	.667	Tim Tolman
Puerto Rico	Senadores de San Juan	3	3	.500	Luis Meléndez
Mexico	Naranjeros de Hermosillo	0	6	.000	Marv Foley

== Individual leaders ==
Player	Statistic
Batting
Raúl Mondesí (DOM)	Batting average	.450
Carlos Delgado (PUR); Raúl Mondesí (DOM)	Runs	6
Carlos Baerga (PUR); Raúl Mondesí (DOM)	Hits	9
Four tied	Doubles	2
Rey Sánchez (PUR)	Triples	2
Jim Bowie (DOM); Carlos Delgado (PUR)	Home runs	3
Jim Bowie (DOM)	RBI	11
Five tied	Stolen bases	1
Pitching
Tom McCarthy (PUR); James Waring (VEN)	Wins	2
Four tied	Strikeouts	6
James Waring	ERA	0.00
James Waring	Innings pitched	13.0
John Kelly (DOM)	Saves	2

== All-Star team ==
Name	Position
Carlos Delgado (PUR)	Catcher
Jim Bowie (DOM)	First baseman
Carlos Baerga (PUR)	Second baseman
Alex Arias (DOM)	Third baseman
Alvaro Espinoza (VEN)	Shortstop
Luis Raven (VEN)	Left fielder
Raúl Mondesí (DOM)	Center fielder
Bobby Abreu (VEN)	Right fielder
Raúl Marcano (VEN)	Designated hitter
Julián Tavárez (DOM)	RH pitcher
Wilson Álvarez (VEN)	LH pitcher
John Kelly (DOM)	Relief pitcher
Awards
Jim Bowie (DOM)	Most Valuable Player
Casey Parsons (DOM)	Manager

== Sources ==
- Nuñez, José Antero (1994). Serie del Caribe de la Habana a Puerto La Cruz. JAN Editor. ISBN 980-07-2389-7
