= Navegantes del Magallanes =

Venezuelan professional baseball team

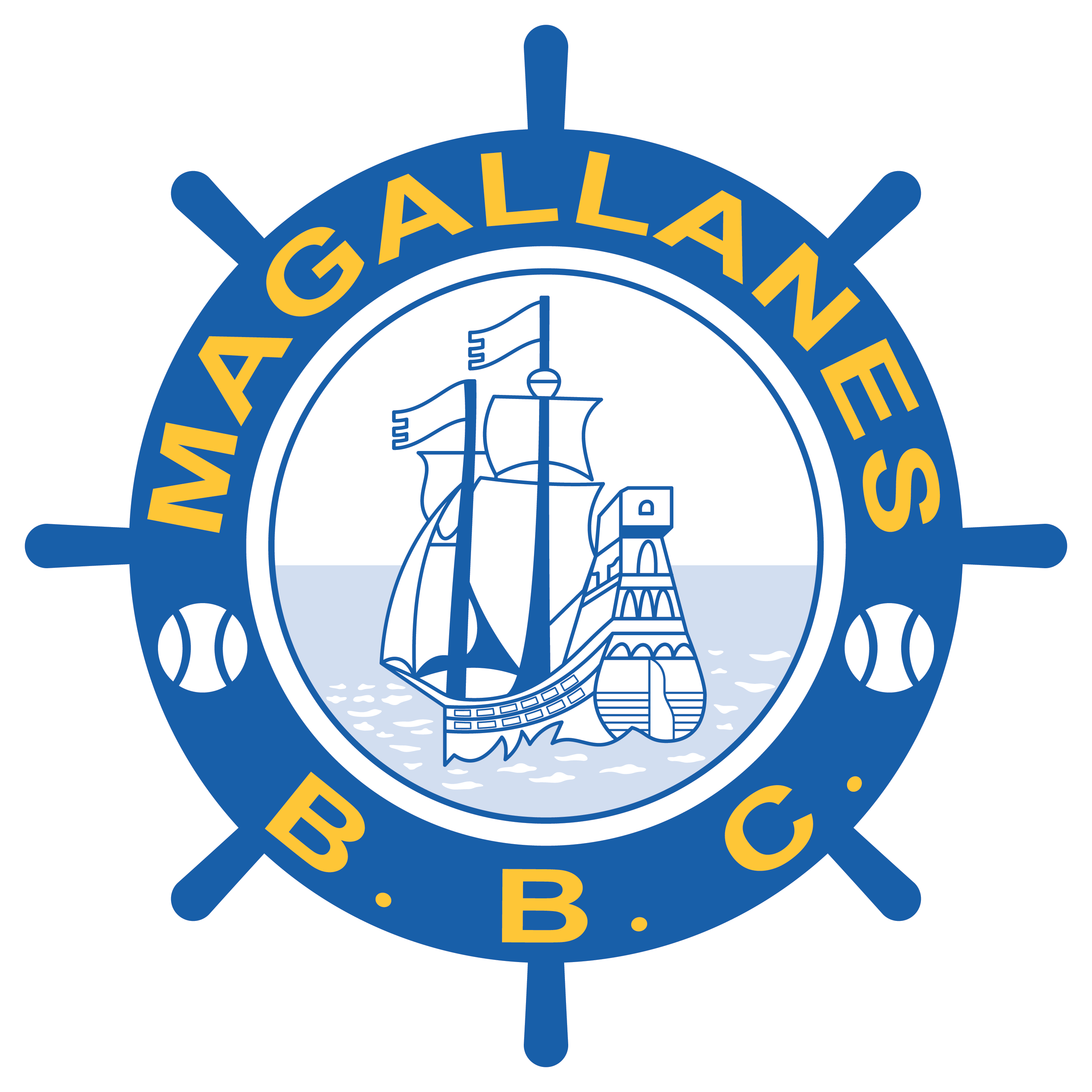

Logo	Cap insignia

Information
- League: Venezuelan Professional Baseball League
- Location: Valencia
- Ballpark: Estadio José Bernardo Pérez
- Founded: 1917 (original); 1964 (modern incarnation)
- Nickname(s): La Nave Turca ("The Turkish Ship"); Turcos ("Turks")
- Caribbean Series championships: 1970, 1979
- Serie de las Américas championships: 2026
- League championships: 1950, 1951, 1955, 1970, 1977, 1979, 1994, 1996, 1997, 2002, 2013, 2014, 2022, 2026

Current uniforms
Home	Away

Navegantes del Magallanes B.B.C., commonly known as Navegantes del Magallanes (Spanish pronunciation: [naβeɣantes del mˌaɣaʎˈanes]; Magellan Navigators), or simply Magallanes, are a professional baseball team in the Venezuelan Professional Baseball League (LVBP), based in Valencia, Carabobo.

Originally founded in Caracas in 1917, Magallanes relocated to Valencia in 1969. The team is one of oldest and most successful clubs in Venezuelan baseball, winning 14 LVBP championships, most recently in 2026 under manager Yadier Molina, as well as 2 Caribbean Series. Its chief rival are the Leones del Caracas; the two are known as Los Eternos Rivales ("the Eternal Rivals").

== History ==
=== Early years ===
The Magallanes Base Ball Club was established on October 26, 1917, in Caracas. The name Magallanes, referring both to Ferdinand Magellan (known as Fernando Magallanes in Spanish) and the Strait of Magellan, was chosen by the founding members in a polling to select the club name; other proposed names were Colón (honoring Christopher Columbus) and Diego de Losada, the founder of the city of Caracas. Antonio Benítez, one of the team's owners, proposed the name Magallanes in reference to the geographical location, suggesting that other teams would founder against them (as ships do in the difficult-to-navigate strait). The Magallanes Base Ball Club debuted the next year, 1918, in the National Baseball Championship. The club, however, would soon fold due to several problems including internal disputes.

It would be ten years until the next team under the name Magallanes debuted, refounded by Benítez, as an amateur club part of the new Venezuelan National League in 1927. The team played in a neighborhood of Caracas populated by immigrants from the former Ottoman Empire, earning them the nickname "Turcos" (Turks). During this period, it developed a fierce rivalry with the cross-town Royal Criollo club, which would later evolve into the modern rivalry between Magallanes and Leones del Caracas. In 1930, the team won its first first division title, thanks to the pitching of Pancho Coimbre and Balbino Inojosa. However, the club again folded before the 1933 season.

The Magallanes name was again revived in 1941 by Carlos Lavaud. The club signed Vidal López, who had won 12 games in Cuba, and Carlos Ascanio, who had been playing in Cuba, as well as Dalmiro Finol, José Pérez Colmenares, and Jesus "Chucho" Ramos. Magallanes won the 1943–44 tournament.

=== Professionalization ===
Magallanes was one of the four original clubs (along with Cerveceria, Vargas, and Venezuela) to form the Venezuelan Professional Baseball League on December 27, 1945.

In 1969, Magallanes were acquired by a group of businessmen based in Carabobo state and moved to the city of Valencia, which had recently lost its team, Industriales de Valencia, before the 1969–70 season.

== Mascot ==
The Capy is the official mascot of the Navegantes del Magallanes baseball team. The bird wears a navigator costume. He has a girlfriend named Lola, a very charming parrot.

== Current roster ==
Navegantes del Magallanes roster – 2025–26 LVBP season
Players		Coaches
Pitchers: 68 (Venezuela) Amilcar Chirinos; 61 (Venezuela) Adolfo Oviedo; 96 (Venezuela) Ángel Pérez; 70 (United States) Dillon Tate; 41 (United States) Drew Parrish; 67 (Venezuela) Enderson Franco; 99 (Venezuela) Felipe Vázquez; 90 (Venezuela) Inmer Lobo; 52 (Venezuela) Ismael Agreda; 32 (Dominican Republic) Jesus Reyes; 95 (Venezuela) Luis Martinez; 94 (Venezuela) Osvaldo Berrios; 92 (Venezuela) Reid Birlingmair; 49 (Venezuela) Ricardo Sanchez; 71 (Colombia) Victor Vargas; 72 (Venezuela) Williander Moreno; 83 (Venezuela) Wilmer Flores; 65 (Venezuela) Yohander Méndez; updated on 15 October 2026	Catchers: 80 (Venezuela) Bryant Betancourt; 24 (Venezuela) Pablo Aliendo; Infielders: 16 (Venezuela) Breyvic Valera; 97 (United States) Cooper Kinney; 78 (Venezuela) Diego Velasquez; 07 (Venezuela) Jose Gomez; 91 (Venezuela) Oswaldo Osorio; 39 (Venezuela) Renato Núñez; 19 (Venezuela) Thairo Estrada; Outfielders: 86 (Venezuela) Alexis Hernandez; 30 (Venezuela) Angel Reyes; 59 (United States) Damon Dues; 93 (Venezuela) Jorge Ruiz; 31 (Venezuela) Oswaldo Arcia; 14 (Venezuela) Tucupita Marcano	Manager: (Puerto Rico) Yadier Molina; Coaches: 47 (Venezuela) Endy Chavez (First Base); 37 (Venezuela) Clemente Álvarez (Catching); 16 (Venezuela) Ramon Borrego (Third Base); 51 (Venezuela) Kleininger Teran (Hitting); 63 (Venezuela) Darwin Marrero (Pitching); 18 (Venezuela) Mario Lisson (Bench); 55 (Venezuela) Miguel Socolovich (Bullpen); 29 (Venezuela) Roberto Espinoza (Quality Control)

== Championships ==
Season	Manager	Record	Series score	Runner-up
1949–50	Lázaro Salazar	32–14	—	Cerveceria Caracas
1950–51	Lázaro Salazar	34–19	—	Cerveceria Caracas
1954–55	Lázaro Salazar	32–18	—	Leones del Caracas
1969–70	Carlos Pascual	32–28	3–0	Tiburones de La Guaira
1976–77	Don Leppert	35–30	4–2	Tiburones de La Guaira
1978–79	Octavio Rojas / Willie Horton	39–31	4–1	Águilas del Zulia
1993–94	Tim Tolman	35–25	4–3	Leones del Caracas
1995–96	Tim Tolman / Gregorio Machado	29–31	4–3	Cardenales de Lara
1996–97	John Tamargo	33–17	4–1	Leones del Caracas
2001–02	Phil Regan	30–32	4–1	Tigres de Aragua
2012–13	Carlos García / Luis Sojo	36–37	4–3	Cardenales de Lara
2013–14	Luis Sojo / Carlos García	33–30	4–1	Caribes de Anzoátegui
2021–22	Wilfredo Romero	33–30	4–3	Caribes de Anzoátegui
2025–26	Yadier Molina	29–27	4–2	Caribes de Anzoátegui

== International competition ==
=== Caribbean Series ===
Year	Host	Finish	Wins	Losses	Win%	Manager
1950	(Puerto Rico) San Juan	4th	1	5	.167	(Venezuela) Vidal López
1951	(Venezuela) Caracas	3rd	2	4	.333	(Cuba) Lázaro Salazar
1955	(Venezuela) Caracas	2nd	4	2	.667	(Cuba) Lázaro Salazar
1970	(Venezuela) Caracas	1st	7	1	.875	(Cuba) Carlos Pascual
1977	(Venezuela) Caracas	2nd	3	3	.500	(United States) Don Leppert
1979	(Puerto Rico) San Juan	1st	5	1	.833	(United States) Willie Horton
1994	(Venezuela) Puerto La Cruz	2nd	4	2	.667	(United States) Tim Tolman
1996	(Dominican Republic) Santo Domingo	4th	1	5	.167	(Venezuela) Gregorio Machado
1997	(Mexico) Hermosillo	3rd	3	3	.500	(United States) John Tamargo
2002	(Venezuela) Caracas	4th	2	4	.333	(United States) Phil Regan
2013	(Mexico) Hermosillo	4th	2	4	.333	(Venezuela) Luis Sojo
2014	(Venezuela) Margarita Island	3rd	3	2	.600	(Venezuela) Carlos García
2022	(Dominican Republic) Santo Domingo	4th	3	3	.500	(Venezuela) Wilfredo Romero
Total			40	39	.506	

2022 Caribbean Series roster

Venezuela 2022 Caribbean Series Roster
Players		Coaches
Pitchers: 37 (Venezuela) Henderson Álvarez; 99 (Venezuela) Silvino Bracho; 34 (Venezuela) Vicente Campos; 0 (Venezuela) Henry Centeno; 67 (Venezuela) Enderson Franco; 61 (Venezuela) Yapson Gómez; 27 (Venezuela) Junior Guerra; 39 (Venezuela) César Jiménez; 83 (Venezuela) José Martínez; 65 (Venezuela) Yohander Méndez; 56 (Venezuela) Wilking Rodríguez; 95 (Venezuela) Danny Rondón; 80 (Venezuela) Bruce Rondón; 35 (Venezuela) Erick Leal; 76 (Venezuela) Anthony Vizcaya; 66 (Venezuela) Robert Zarate; updated on 31 January 2020	Catchers: 98 (Venezuela) Francisco Arcia; 87 (Venezuela) Anderson De La Rosa; 63 (Venezuela) Arturo Nieto; Infielders: 17 (Venezuela) Rayder Ascanio; 28 (Venezuela) Balbino Fuenmayor; 16 (Venezuela) Gabriel Noriega; 4 (Venezuela) Niuman Romero; 48 (Venezuela) Pablo Sandoval; 5 (Brazil) Leonardo Reginatto; 14 (Venezuela) Engelb Vielma; Outfielders: 96 (Venezuela) Willians Astudillo; 33 (Dominican Republic) Alejandro De Aza; 32 (United States) Cade Gotta; 75 (Venezuela) Alberth Martínez; 31 (Venezuela) Ángel Reyes; 6 (Venezuela) Danry Vásquez	Manager: -- (Venezuela) Willie Romero; Coaches

=== Serie de las Américas ===
Year	Host	Finish	Wins	Losses	Win%	Manager
2026	(Venezuela) Gran Caracas	1st	7	1	.875	(Venezuela) César Izturis
Total			7	1	.875	

== Notable players ==
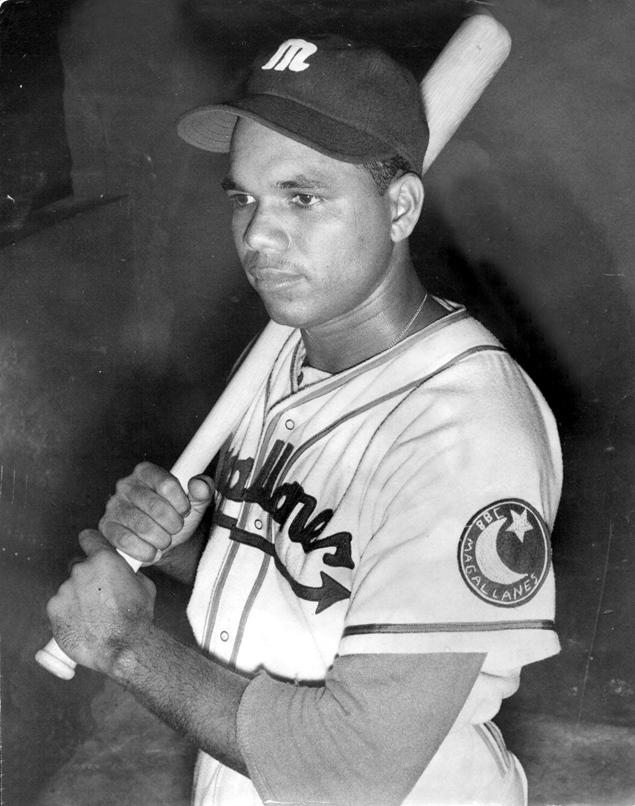
Luis “Camaleón” García

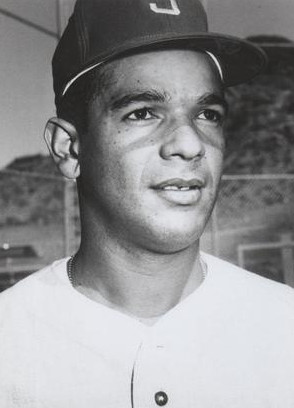
Gustavo Gil

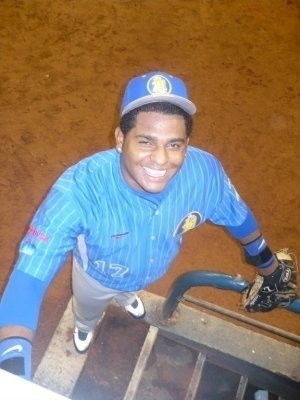
Pablo Sandoval

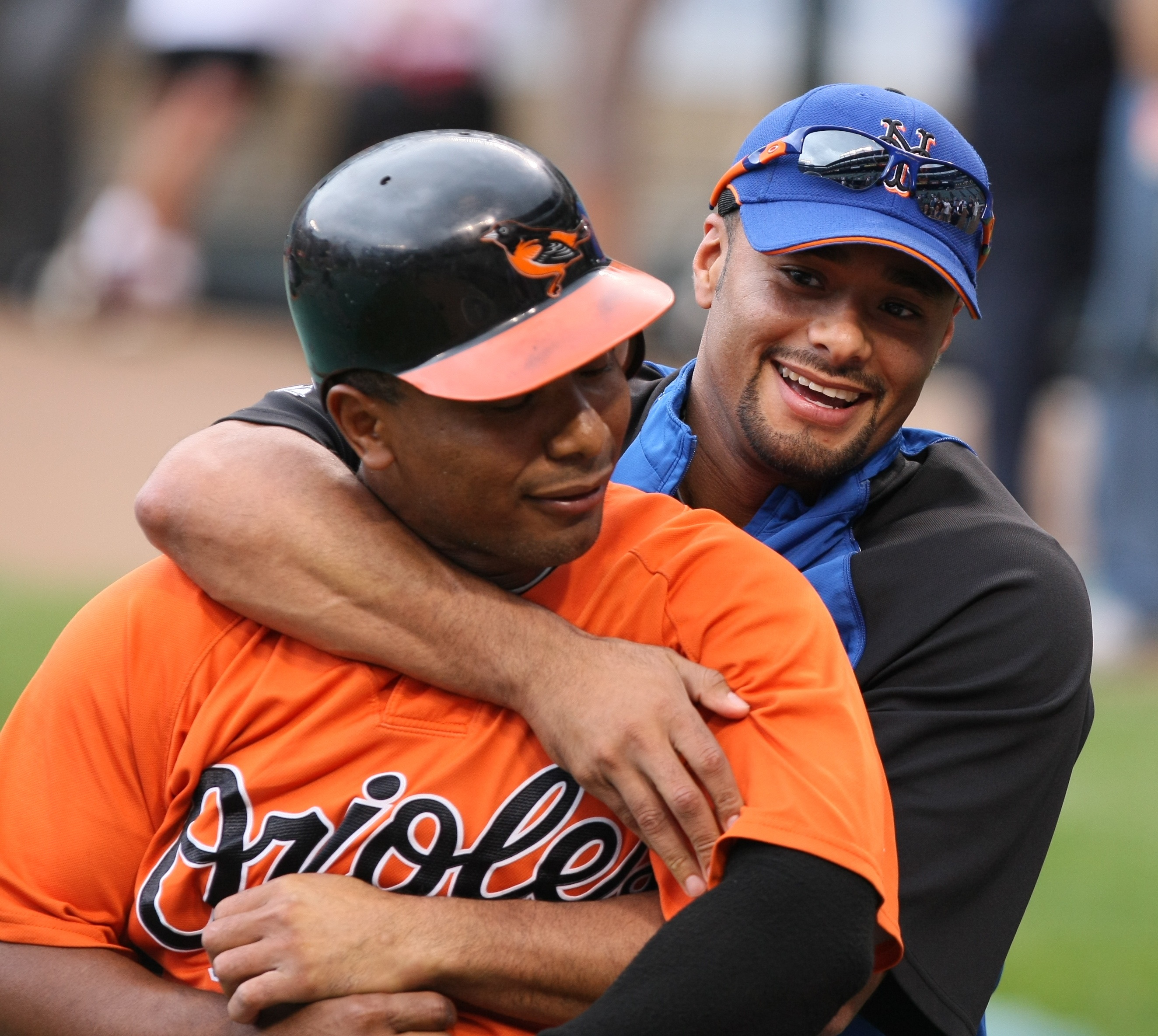
Melvin Mora and Johan Santana

=== Retired numbers ===
**11**; **Luis Aparicio**; SS; Retired	**15**; **Félix**; **Rodríguez**; IF; Retired	**21**; **Luis** **“Camaleón”** **García**; SS; Retired	**23**; **Néstor Isaías** **"Látigo"**; **Chávez**; OF; Retired

=== Navegantes del Magallanes Hall of Fame ===
Magallanes established a team Hall of Fame in 2012.

Key
Class	Year of induction
**Bold**	Inducted into Major League Baseball Baseball Hall of Fame
†	Inducted into Venezuelan Baseball Hall of Fame and Museum

Navegantes del Magallanes Hall of Fame
Class	Name	Position	Tenure
2012	Vidal López^{†}	P	1941–1945 (amateur); 1946–1955 (professional)
2012	Chucho Ramos^{†}	OF	1946–1956
2012	Lázaro Salazar^{†}	Manager	1949–1959
2012	Ramón Monzant^{†}	P	1953–1956
2012	Luis "Camaleón" García^{†}	3B	1949–1965
2012	Gustavo Gil^{†}	2B	1968–1977
2012	Dámaso Blanco^{†}	3B	1969–1975
2012	**Dave Parker**	OF	1974–1977
2012	Cito Gaston	OF	1968–1976
2012	Oswaldo Olivares^{†}	OF	1977–1980
2012	Carlos Lavaud^{†}	Executive	1941–1956
2012	Edgar Rincones	Executive	1969–2007
2012	José Ettedgui	Executive	1969–1992
2012	Rafael "Felo" Ramírez	Broadcaster	
2013	Félix Rodríguez	1B	1972–1989
2013	Gregorio Machado	P, Coach	1969–1974 (player); 1974–2010 (coach)
2013	Jim Holt	OF, 1B	1969–1974
2013	Alberto Raidi	Executive	
2014	Manuel Sarmiento	P	1972–1983
2014	Mitchell Page	OF, 1B	1976–1979
2014	Oswaldo Degwitz	Executive	
2015	Alfredo Guadarrama	Executive	
2015	Álvaro Espinoza	SS	1992–1996
2015	Carlos García	IF, Manager	1987–1998 (player); 2009–2014 (manager)
2016	Carlos Pulido^{†}	P	
2016	Alberto Parjús	Executive	1977–1979
2016	Oscar Henríquez	P	1993–2003
2016	Eddy Díaz	UTIL	1991–2004
2017	Santiago Sánchez	Executive	1982–1989
2017	Richard Hidalgo	OF	1991–2012
2017	Ramón García	P	1987–1998
2017	Melvin Mora^{†}	UTIL	1991–2012
2018	Antonio José Istúriz	Executive	1964–1969
2018	Edgardo Alfonzo	3B	1996–2011
2018	Carlos Hernández	2B	
2018	Jim Pendleton	SS	1949–1953
2019	Johan Santana^{†}	P	1998–2002
2019	Willie Horton	OF / Manager	1978–1980
2023	Clemente Álvarez	C	1986–2005
2023	Isaías "Látigo" Chávez	P	1964–1968

=== Other notable players ===
- Jose Altuve, infielder
- Sam Nahem (1915–2004), Major League Baseball pitcher
- Endy Chávez, MLB outfielder
- Luis Arráez, MLB infielder
- Leonardo Reginatto, infielder
- Reynaldo Rodríguez, infielder
- Ezequiel Carrera, outfielder
- Elvis Andrus, infielder
- Pablo Sandoval, infielder
- Johan Santana, pitcher
- Freddy Garcia, pitcher
- Luis Raven, infielder
- Mario Lisson, infielder
- Emilio Cueche, pitcher
- Barry Bonds, outfielder
- Luis Aparicio Sr., infielder
- Luis Rengifo, infielder
- Félix Hernández, pitcher
- Billy Bean, outfielder
- Cito Gaston
- Kenny Lofton

== Attendances ==
In the 2015–16 season, the Navegantes del Magallanes became the club with the second-highest average home attendance in the league, with an average of 8,759. In the 2023–24 season, the Navegantes drew an average home league attendance of 3,257, the third-highest in the league.

== Bibliography ==
- Javier González; Carlos Figueroa Ruiz. Campos de Gloria: El beisbol en Venezuela, 127 años de historia 1895-2022 (PDF) (in Spanish). Biblioteca Digital Banesco.
