= 1970 Caribbean Series =

1970 baseball tournament

After nine years of absence, the thirteenth edition of the Caribbean Series (Serie del Caribe) was revived in 1970 without the representing baseball clubs of Cuba and Panama. It was held in Caracas, Venezuela from February 5 to February 10 at Estadio Universitario, featuring the original members of the first stage. Puerto Rico was represented by the Leones de Ponce, while the host Navegantes del Magallanes represented Venezuela. The Dominican Republic debuted in the Series and was represented by the Tigres del Licey to complete a three-team tournament. The format consisted of 12 games, with each team facing the other competitors three times. Because the series was so small, each team had to face each other in one night.

== Summary ==
For the first time, Venezuela captured the competition with a record of 7–1 behind strong pitching performances by Orlando Peña (2-0, 2.00 ERA in 18.0 innings pitched), Aurelio Monteagudo (2-0, one shutout, 16 SO, 0.00 in 12 2/3 IP), Jay Ritchie (no hit no run, nine-SO shutout), and Larry Jaster (1-0, 3.30 ERA in 16 1/3 IP). With Carlos Pascual as manager, 1B Gonzalo Márquez was voted Most Valuable Player after leading Series hitters with a .478 batting average (11-for-25). Other contributions came from 2B Gustavo Gil (.387, four runs, seven RBI), CF César Tovar (.349, five runs, three stolen bases), C Ray Fosse (.391, four runs), and 3B Dámaso Blanco (five runs, five RBI). Also in the roster were infielder Chico Ruiz, outfielder Jim Holt, and pitchers Don Eddy, Mike Hedlund and Luis Peñalver.

The team of Puerto Rico, with Jim Fregosi at the helm, finished second with a 4–4 mark. The pitching staff was led by Wayne Simpson, who went 2–0 with a 1.12 ERA and two complete games, including a four-hit shutout. Also in the roster were pitchers Mike Cuellar, Paul Doyle and Clyde Wright; catcher Pat Corrales; infielders José Cruz (1B), Sandy Alomar Sr. (2B), Tony Pérez (3B) and Jackie Hernández (SS), and outfielders Julio Roque (LF), Luis Meléndez (CF) and Bernie Carbo (RF). Meléndez led the Puerto Rican offensive with one home run, six runs and six RBI.

Dominican Republic, led by outfielder/manager Manny Mota, ended in last place with a 1–7 record. The team's only victory came behind a strong pitching effort from Reggie Cleveland, who threw nine innings of one-hit, one run ball against Puerto Rico. The team featured players as Matty Alou, Rico Carty, César Cedeño, Elvio Jiménez and Freddie Velázquez.

== Participating teams ==
Team	Manager	Means of qualification
(Puerto Rico) Leones de Ponce	(United States) Jim Fregosi	Winners of the 1969–70 Puerto Rican Professional Baseball League
(Dominican Republic) Tigres del Licey	(Dominican Republic) Manny Mota	Winners of the 1969–70 Dominican Professional Baseball League
(Venezuela) Navegantes del Magallanes	(Cuba) Carlos Pascual	Winners of the 1969–70 Venezuelan Professional Baseball League

== Final standings ==
Country	Club	W	L	W/L %	Managers
	Venezuela	7	1	.875	Carlos Pascual
	Puerto Rico	4	4	.500	Jim Fregosi
	Dominican Republic	1	7	.125	Manny Mota

== Individual leaders ==
Player	Statistic
Batting
Gonzalo Márquez (VEN)	Batting average	.440
Rico Carty (DOM); Pat Corrales (PUR); Luis Meléndez (PUR); Armando Ortiz (VEN); Tony Pérez (PUR); Freddie Velázquez (DOM)	Home runs	1
Gustavo Gil (VEN)	Runs batted in	7
Luis Meléndez (PUR); Manny Mota (DOM)	Runs	6
Gustavo Gil (VEN)	Hits	12
Bernie Carbo (PUR); César Cedeño (DOM); Ray Fosse (VEN); César Tovar (VEN)	Doubles	2
Ray Fosse (VEN); César Tovar (VEN)	Triples	1
Gonzalo Márquez/Venezuela	Stolen bases	4
Pitching
Aurelio Monteagudo (VEN); Orlando Peña (VEN); Wayne Simpson (PUR)	Wins	2
Aurelio Monteagudo (VEN)	Strikeouts	16
Aurelio Monteagudo (VEN)	ERA	0.00
Orlando Peña (VEN)	Innings pitched	18.0

== All-Star team ==
Name	Position
Ray Fosse (VEN)	Catcher
Gonzalo Márquez (VEN)	First baseman
Gustavo Gil (VEN)	Second baseman
Tony Pérez (PUR)	Third baseman
Jesús Aristimuño (VEN)	Shortstop
César Cedeño (DOM)	Left fielder
César Tovar (VEN)	Center fielder
Luis Meléndez (PUR)	Right fielder
Aurelio Monteagudo (VEN); Orlando Peña (VEN)	Pitchers
Carlos Pascual (VEN)	Manager

Source: Serie del Caribe

== Scoreboards ==
=== Game 1, February 5 ===
Team	1	2	3	4	5	6	7	8	9	R	H	E
Puerto Rico	0	0	1	0	0	0	0	3	0	4	7	0
Dominican Republic	0	0	0	1	1	0	0	0	0	2	6	1
WP: Wayne Simpson (1-0) LP: Santiago Guzmán (0-1); Home runs: PUR: Tony Pérez (1); DOM: Freddie Velázquez (1)

=== Game 2, February 5 ===
Team	1	2	3	4	5	6	7	8	9	R	H	E
Puerto Rico	0	0	0	0	0	0	0	0	1	1	6	0
Venezuela	0	0	1	0	0	0	2	0	x	3	4	1
WP: Orlando Peña (1-0) LP: Mike Cuellar (0-1); Home runs: PUR: None; VEN: Armando Ortiz

=== Game 3, February 6 ===
Team	1	2	3	4	5	6	7	8	9	10	11	12	13	14	15	R	H	E
Dominican Republic	0	0	0	0	0	0	0	2	0	0	0	0	0	0	0	2	13	1
Puerto Rico	0	0	1	0	0	0	0	0	1	0	0	0	0	0	1	3	13	0
WP: Félix Roque (1-0) LP: Reggie Cleveland (0-1)

=== Game 4, February 6 ===
Team	1	2	3	4	5	6	7	8	9	R	H	E
Dominican Republic	3	0	0	0	0	0	0	1	0	4	9	2
Venezuela	0	0	4	0	0	6	0	0	x	10	17	0
WP: Larry Jaster (1-0) LP: Silvano Quezada (0-1); Home runs: DOM: Rico Carty (1); VEN: None

=== Game 5, February 7 ===
Team	1	2	3	4	5	6	7	8	9	R	H	E
Venezuela	3	0	0	0	0	0	1	0	0	4	12	0
Dominican Republic	0	0	0	0	0	0	0	0	0	0	0	2
WP: Jay Ritchie (1-0) LP: Milcíades Olivo (0-1)

=== Game 6, February 7 ===
Team	1	2	3	4	5	6	7	8	9	R	H	E
Venezuela	3	0	0	0	0	0	1	0	0	4	11	1
Puerto Rico	0	1	0	0	3	0	0	0	1	5	12	0
WP: Paul Doyle (1-0) LP: Don Eddy (0-1); Home runs: VEN: None; PUR: Pat Corrales (1), Luis Meléndez (1)

=== Game 7, February 8 ===
Team	1	2	3	4	5	6	7	8	9	R	H	E
Dominican Republic	1	0	0	1	0	0	0	0	0	2	12	0
Puerto Rico	1	0	0	0	0	0	0	0	0	1	1	2
WP: Reggie Cleveland (1-1) LP: Rickey Clark (0-1)

=== Game 8, February 8 ===
Team	1	2	3	4	5	6	7	8	9	R	H	E
Venezuela	0	0	0	0	0	0	4	0	0	4	7	0
Puerto Rico	0	0	0	0	0	0	0	0	0	0	4	1
WP: Aurelio Monteagudo (1-0) LP: Raúl Mercado (0-1)

=== Game 9, February 9 ===
Team	1	2	3	4	5	6	7	8	9	R	H	E
Puerto Rico	1	0	0	0	0	0	0	0	1	2	10	0
Dominican Republic	0	0	0	0	0	0	0	0	0	0	4	2
WP: Wayne Simpson (2-0) LP: Danilo Rivas (0-1)

=== Game 10, February 9 ===
Team	1	2	3	4	5	6	7	8	9	R	H	E
Venezuela	0	0	2	0	0	0	0	2	0	4	10	1
Dominican Republic	0	0	0	0	0	1	0	2	0	3	11	1
WP: Orlando Peña (2-0) LP: Santiago Guzmán (0-2)

=== Game 11, February 10 ===
Team	1	2	3	4	5	6	7	8	9	10	11	R	H	E
Puerto Rico	1	0	0	1	0	0	0	1	0	0	0	3	12	2
Venezuela	1	0	0	0	1	0	0	1	0	0	1	4	11	1
WP: Aurelio Monteagudo (2-0) LP: Ron Kline (0-1); Home runs: PUR: Frank Rivera (1); VEN: None

=== Game 12, February 10 ===
Team	1	2	3	4	5	6	7	8	9	R	H	E
Dominican Republic	0	0	0	0	0	2	0	0	0	2	7	1
Venezuela	2	1	0	0	0	0	0	0	x	3	5	1
WP: Gregorio Machado (1-0) LP: David Hernández (0-1) Sv: Gilberto Marcano (1)

== See also ==
- Ballplayers who have played in the Series

== Sources ==
- Antero Núñez, José. Series del Caribe. Jefferson, Caracas, Venezuela: Impresos Urbina, C.A., 1987.
- Gutiérrez, Daniel. Enciclopedia del Béisbol en Venezuela – 1895-2006 . Caracas, Venezuela: Impresión Arte, C.A., 2007.
