= Carlos Pascual =

Carlos Pascual could refer to:

- Carlos Pascual (baseball) (1931–2011), Cuban baseball player
- Carlos Pascual (diplomat) (born 1959), American diplomat
