= Mike Hedlund =

American baseball player (born 1946)

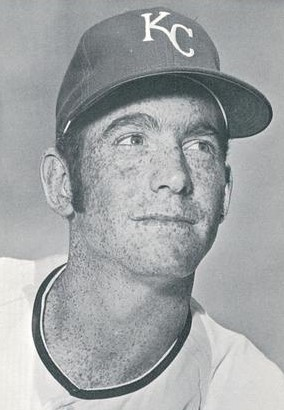
- Pitcher
- Born: August 11, 1946 (age 79); Dallas, Texas, U.S.
- Batted: Right Threw: Right

MLB debut
- May 8, 1965, for the Cleveland Indians

Last MLB appearance
- September 30, 1972, for the Kansas City Royals

MLB statistics
- Win–loss record: 25–24
- Earned Run Average: 3.56
- Strikeouts: 211
- Stats at Baseball Reference

Teams
- Cleveland Indians (1965, 1968); Kansas City Royals (1969–1972)

Michael David Hedlund (born August 11, 1946) is an American former Major League Baseball pitcher who played for six seasons. He played for the Cleveland Indians in 1965 and 1968 and the Kansas City Royals from 1969 to 1972.

== Cleveland Indians ==
Hedlund was born in Dallas, Texas, and signed as an amateur free agent with the Cleveland Indians upon graduation from Arlington High School in 1964. He was just eighteen years old when he made his major league debut on May 8, 1965 against the Boston Red Sox. He appeared in just six games, and pitched a total of 5.1 innings before returning to the minors.

He returned to the majors in 1968 as a September call up, and appeared in three games. After the season, he was selected by the Kansas City Royals in the 1968 Major League Baseball expansion draft.

== Kansas City Royals ==
Hedlund went 3–6 with a 3.24 earned run average during the Royals' inaugural season. Used as both a starter and relief pitcher, he was far more effective out of the bullpen, posting a 1.69 ERA and earning two saves. His finest start came on September 18 when he held the Oakland Athletics to just one run, and struck out eight to earn the complete game victory.

After the season, Hedlund pitched for Tiburones de La Guaira in the Venezuelan Professional Baseball League. He set a league record by not allowing an earned run for the first 53 innings he pitched, and finishing with a 0.75 ERA. While in Venezuela, Hedlund would contract the Hong Kong flu and bronchitis, causing him to lose thirty pounds. But he recovered and served as a reinforcement for the Navegantes del Magallanes, eventual champions of the 1970 Caribbean Series.

Hedlund began the 1970 in the majors, but was ineffective, and was reassigned to the triple A Omaha Royals. In 1971, the Royals boasted one of the most talented young starting rotations in the majors with Hedlund, Dick Drago and Paul Splittorff all under 27 years old. After narrowly avoiding one hundred losses in 1970, the Royals improved to 85–76, in 1971 to finish second in the American League West. For his part, Hedlund rebounded to go 15–8 in with the league's fourth best ERA, 2.71. After the season, Hedlund traveled to Vietnam with a group of Major League ballplayers on a tour of hospitals and military bases.

Hedlund started 1972 in the Royals' rotation, but after starting the season 0–5, was moved into the bullpen. He improved considerably at that point; winning his next four starts when used by manager Bob Lemon as a spot starter. At the 1972 Winter meetings he was traded back to the Cleveland Indians for utility infielder Kurt Bevacqua.

== Minor leagues ==
The Indians intended to use Hedlund as a long reliever and spot starter, but he failed to make the club out of Spring training. He spent the entire 1973 season with the triple A Oklahoma City 89ers, going 7–8 with a 4.44 ERA. The following Spring, he was traded to the Chicago White Sox for minor league outfielder Ken Hottman. Despite a respectable 2.90 ERA, Hedlund was 5–8 in 1974 for the Iowa Oaks. He was traded again after the season, this time to the Cincinnati Reds for Dan Osborn, but never played a game with them at any level.
