= 1997 Caribbean Series =

1997 baseball tournament

The thirty-ninth edition of the Caribbean Series (Serie del Caribe) was held from February 4 through February 9 of 1997 with the champion baseball teams of the Dominican Republic, Águilas Cibaeñas; Mexico, Tomateros de Culiacán; Puerto Rico, Indios de Mayagüez, and Venezuela, Navegantes del Magallanes. The format consisted of 12 games, each team facing the other teams twice, and the games were played at Estadio Héctor Espino in Hermosillo, Sonora, Mexico.

== Final standings ==
Country	Club	W	L	W/L %	Managers
Dominican Republic	Águilas Cibaeñas	4	2	.667	Mike Quade
Mexico	Tomateros de Culiacán	3	3	.500	Francisco Estrada
Venezuela	Navegantes del Magallanes	3	3	.500	John Tamargo
Puerto Rico	Indios de Mayagüez	2	4	.333	Tom Gamboa

== Individual leaders ==
Player	Statistic
Batting
Bobby Abreu (VEN)	Batting average	.588
Jesús Tavárez (DOM)	Runs	10
José Offerman (DOM)	Hits	12
Four players tied	Doubles	3
Two players tied	Triples	1
Armando Ríos (PUR); Matt Stark (MEX)	Home runs	4
Tony Batista (DOM)	RBI	13
Roberto Alomar (PUR)	Stolen bases	4
Pitching
Twelve players tied	Wins	1
José Parra (DOM)	Strikeouts	11
Ramón García (VEN)	ERA	0.00
Darío Veras (DOM)	Saves	2

== All-Star team ==
Name	Position
Guillermo García (DOM)	Catcher
Luis Raven (VEN)	First baseman
Ever Magallanes (MEX)	Second baseman
Edgardo Alfonzo (VEN)	Third baseman
Luis Sojo (VEN)	Shortstop
Luis García (MEX)	Left fielder
Armando Ríos (PUR)	Center fielder
Bobby Abreu (VEN)	Right fielder
Matt Stark (MEX)	Designated hitter
Ramón García (VEN)	Right-handed pitcher
Ted Higuera (MEX)	Left-handed pitcher
Awards
Matt Stark (MEX)	Most Valuable Player
Mike Quade (DOM)	Manager

== Sources ==
- Bjarkman, Peter. Diamonds around the Globe: The Encyclopedia of International Baseball. Greenwood. ISBN 978-0-313-32268-6
- Serie del Caribe : History, Records and Statistics (Spanish)
