= Gregorio Machado =

Venezuelan baseball manager

- Pitcher / Manager
- Born: March 12, 1949 (age 77); Tacarigua, Miranda, Venezuela
- Bats: Unknown Throws: Right
- Stats at Baseball Reference

Omar Gregorio Machado is a Venezuelan former baseball player, manager and coach. He played in the Mexican Baseball League (LMB) and in the Venezuelan Professional Baseball League (LVBP). Machado has also coached extensively in the LVBP, mainly with Navegantes del Magallanes.

Machado was inducted into the Magallanes Hall of Fame in 2013. At the time, he was the only member of the team to have participated in all nine championships won since the team's arrival in Valencia in 1969.

== Career ==
A right-handed relief pitcher, Machado made his LVBP debut with Magallanes in the 1968-69 LVBP season, appearing in only two games. However, the following year he posted a 3–1 record and a 3.19 earned run average in 15 games, earning him LVBP's Rookie of the Year honors (jointly with Virgilio Mata). That year, the team won the LVBP championship and went on to take the 1970 Caribbean Series title. Machado's best season was 1971–72, where he worked to a 2.85 ERA in 18 games, over 41.0 innings pitched. He finished his LVBP career after seven seasons with Magallanes, posting a 3.83 ERA, a 7–7 record, and 100 career strikeouts.

Machado also played in the Mexican League with five teams over three seasons: Saltillo and Poza Rica (1971), Córdoba and Sabinas (1972), and Chihuahua (1973).

After his playing career ended, Machado spent nearly four decades working with Magallanes as a bench coach, pitching coach, base coach, and occasional manager. He first took the reins as a manager in the 1980–81 season, as an interim replacement for Jim Napier (himself a midseason replacement of Luis Aparicio). Machado again took over for manager Tim Tolman during the 1996 final series against the Cardenales de Lara; under Machado, the team overcame a 3–1 deficit and won the series in seven games. In doing so, Machado became the first Venezuelan-born manager to win a championship with Magallanes. Machado again took the reins partway in the 2004–05 season, replacing Marc Bombard. He briefly left the organization to manage the Bravos de Margarita for two seasons, but again returned to manage Magallanes for a brief stint in the 2010–11 season.

He was also a scout for the New York Mets organization, signing Endy Chávez and Edgardo Alfonzo.

== Extrenal links ==
- Career statistics from Baseball Reference (Minors)
