= Luis Peñalver =

Venezuelan baseball player (1941–2019)

- Pitcher
- Born: November 20, 1941; Cumaná, Sucre, Venezuela
- Died: December 21, 2019 (aged 78); Caracas, Venezuela
- Batted: Right Threw: Right

Teams
- Mexican League: Sultanes de Monterrey (1969–1971; 1975–1978); Venezuelan League: Indios de Oriente (1960–1963); Estrellas Orientales (1963–1964); Navegantes del Magallanes (1964–1966); Leones del Caracas (1966–1975; 1976–1982); Aguilas del Zulia (1975–1976); Tigres de Aragua (1982–1983)

Member of the Venezuelan

Baseball Hall of Fame
- Induction: 2008
Medals
Men's baseball
Representing Venezuela
Pan American Games
Gold medal – first place	1959 Chicago	Team

Luis Antonio Peñalver [pay-nyahl-verr'] (born November 20, 1941- December 21, 2019) was a Venezuelan professional baseball pitcher. Listed at 5' 11" (1.82 m.), 170 lb. (77 k.), he batted and threw right handed.

Born in Cumaná, Sucre, Peñalver was a pitcher whose career spanned from 1960 through 1983, playing for several teams in different leagues across the United States, as well as the top professional leagues in Mexico and Venezuela.

Considered a workhorse who could pitch every year in different leagues, Peñalver relied on an array of breaking pitches and pinpoint control on his straight four-seam fastball. But Peñalver never tried to finesse batters, he did try to intimidate them by using a high leg kick during his windup that resembled Juan Marichal. Overall, Peñalver posted a 237-212 record with a 3.35 ERA in 964 pitching appearances through the length of his 23-year career.

== Playing career ==
=== Early career ===
Peñalver made a pretty good impression on baseball scouts at a young age, when he was undefeated in two starts to help lead the Venezuela national team to the 1959 Pan American Games Gold Medal.

At age 18, Peñalver debuted with the Indios de Oriente club of the Venezuelan Professional Baseball League in the 1960–1961 season. He went 2-3 with a 3.98 ERA in 16 games (seven starts) and, despite being a teenager, finished as the team's third most used pitcher after future Hall of Famer Bob Gibson (21 games) and the local idol Carrao Bracho (20).

=== Minor league baseball ===
Afterwards, the San Francisco Giants signed Peñalver and assigned him to the El Paso Sun Kings in 1961. He went 14-8 with a 4.14 ERA, tying for second in the Sophomore League in wins, while batting .271 with one home run and 20 RBI as a pitcher and fourth outfielder.

His most productive season in the minors came with the Class-A Burlington Senators in 1967, when he went 12-9 with a 2.37 ERA in a career-high 205 innings pitched. He also ranked among the top 10 pitchers in the Carolina League, finishing third in innings and sixth in strikeouts (169), while tying for eight in wins.

Subsequently, in 1968 Peñalver joined the Dallas-Fort Worth Spurs, a Houston Astros Double-A team, where he had a record of 5-10 and a 3.81 ERA. On May 26 of that season, he hurled a 3–0, seven-inning no-hitter in the first game of a doubleheader against the Memphis Blues. Furthermore, Peñalver struck out three batters, allowing Roy Foster to reach base twice on a walk and an error, while helping himself with an RBI single.

From 1973 to 1974 Peñalver pitched for the Double-A San Antonio Brewers, where he was converted into a closer. In his first season for them, he went 9-5 with a 1.78 ERA and 20 saves. In addition, he led the Texas League in saves and was named an All-Star relief pitcher in the circuit. The next year, he finished with a 6-7 mark, six saves and a 3.56 ERA in 37 games, including four starts.

=== Mexican and Venezuelan leagues ===
Peñalver also spent parts of 10 seasons at Triple–A ball. Used mostly as a starter, he had a record of 79-74 with a 2.81 ERA for the Sultanes de Monterrey of the Mexican League in seven full seasons spanning 1969–1978.

In between, Peñalver played winter ball in the Venezuelan Professional Baseball League during his entire 23-year career. Beside the aforementioned Indios de Oriente, he also pitched for the Estrellas Orientales, Navegantes del Magallanes, Leones del Caracas, Águilas del Zulia and Tigres de Aragua, collecting an overall record of 84-70 with a very solid 3.08 ERA in 384 games pitched. Additionally, he was member of the VPBL champion team in four Caribbean Series, winning the 1970 and 1982 tournaments with Magallanes and Caracas, respectively.

== Post-playing career and legacy ==
Following his retirement, Peñalver joined the Leones del Caracas coaching staff.

Peñalver etched his name in the Venezuelan League records books by holding top ten spots in several pitching statistics. He is tied with Carrao Bracho in second place for the most seasons played (23), surpassed only by Giovanni Carrara (24). He also ranks second in innings (1516 1/3) to Bracho (1769 2/3), third in wins (84) behind Bracho (109) and Diego Seguí (95), fourth in strikeouts (748), fifth in complete games (45), and eighth in relief games (225) for all pitchers with at least 500 innings of work. All of his spots still intact to the present day.

In 2008, Peñalver gained induction in the Venezuelan Baseball Hall of Fame and Museum. He was inducted as well in the Hall in 2015, when the entire 1959 Pan American Games champion team was honored.

== Pitching statistics (1960–1983) ==
Years	League	W	L	W-L%	ERA	GP	GS	CG	SV	IP	HA	ER	SO	BB	Ref
1960–1983	VPBL	84	70	.545	3.08	384	161	45	24	1511.2	1615	518	748	337	
1961	Class-D	14	8	.636	4.14	42	11	0	0	152.0	154	70	0	54	
1962; 1969–1970; 1979	Triple A	6	3	.667	3.21	54	0	0	0	84.0	103	30	34	11	
1962–1964; 1968; 1972–1974	Double A	42	38	.525	3.55	256	29	3	33	664.0	688	262	457	166	
1967	Class-A	12	9	.571	2.37	27	27	15	0	205.0	194	54	169	29	
1969–1971; 1975–1978	MBL	79	84	.485	3.62	201	170	91	0	1293.0	1335	520	674	71	
