= Águilas Cibaeñas =

Professional baseball team in Santiago, Dominican Republic

Logo	Cap insignia

Information
- League: Dominican Professional Baseball League
- Location: Santiago de los Caballeros, Dominican Republic
- Ballpark: Estadio Cibao (1968–present)
- Founded: 28 January 1933; 93 years ago
- Nickname(s): Las Cuyayas ("The Kestrels"); Los Mameyes ("The Mameyes"); El Conjunto Amarillo ("The Yellow Ensemble")
- Caribbean Series championships: 6: (1997; 1998; 2001; 2003; 2007; 2021)
- League championships: 22: (1952; 1964–65; 1966–67; 1971–72; 1974–75; 1975–76; 1977–78; 1978-79; 1985–86; 1986–87; 1992–93; 1995–96; 1996–97; 1997–98; 1999–00; 2000–01; 2002–03, 2004–05; 2006–07; 2007–08; 2017–18; 2020–21)
- Former name: Águilas del Chipote; Águilas del Sandino (1920–1930); Santiago Baseball Club (1930–1937)
- Colors: Yellow, white, black
- Mascot: Aguilita
- Retired numbers: 1; 3; 4; 9; 10; 10; 14; 18; 22; 24; 25; 29; 31; 32
- General manager: Gian Guzmán
- Manager: Francisco Cervelli
- Website: www.aguilas.com.do (in Spanish)

Current uniforms
Home	Away	Third

The Águilas Cibaeñas Baseball Club, better known by its commercial name as Águilas Cibaeñas, (AC; Latin American Spanish pronunciation: [ˈaɣilas θˌiβaˈeɲas]; Cibaoan Eagles) are the best baseball team in the Dominican Republic's Professional Baseball League (LIDOM), based in Santiago in the northern region of Cibao. Founded in 1933, the team has won six Caribbean Series and 22 national titles. Estadio Cibao is the home stadium of the Águilas.

The team is popular among Dominican baseball fans by the phrase : “La Leña Está Aquí” (The Wood is here), and Águilas Cibaeñas has earned the nickname “Las Cuyayas” (The Kestrels) and “Los Mameyes” (The Mameyes). These nicknames are in reference to the team’s mascot and the classic yellow color the team uses in its official uniform. The Águilas Cibaeñas won the final game of the series at their home stadium Estadio Cibao (Stadium Cibao) by the score 2–1. Mendy Lopez and Rafael Furcal both hit home runs in the game. Furcal—popularly known as “Furcalazo”—sealed the game with his homerun in the 8th inning.

== History ==
The meeting was attended by many notable Dominican athletes of the time including; Luis Alfáu, Pilindo Bonetti, Charles Dore, Manuel Henriquez, Burrulote Rodríguez, Julio and Miguel Peguero Linval, Luis Mercado, and Tomas Sainllant. The athletes recommended that the National Championship of 1937 should be held between a team from Santiago, a team from San Pedro de Macorís and a team from the capital, Ciudad Trujillo (renamed from Santo Domingo). The team from the Capital was formed from two others, the Leones del Escogido and the Tigres del Licey, Trujillo himself named them the Dragones de Ciudad Trujillo. The proposal was accepted and the team representing Santiago would be known from then on as the Águilas Cibaeñas. Since then, the club has become one of today's most competitive clubs in the history of Dominican professional baseball.

The development of the Águilas Cibaeñas as a team is linked to the development of baseball in the valley of Cibao. From 1951 to 1954, the championships were held during the summer months. However, before the start of season in 1955 the traditional professional baseball championship was moved to the winter season to allow the most prominent Dominican players an opportunity to play in it. Still to this day Dominican players employed by teams in the MLB take part of this national winter classic to keep the tradition strong.

Águilas Cibaeñas have more former players in Major League Baseball than any other Dominican team. Some current and former MLB players who played with Águilas Cibaeñas include Edwin Encarnación, Carlos Martínez, Jose Reyes, Jonathan Villar, Carlos Gómez, Juan Lagares, Dellin Betances, Bartolo Colón, Wandy Rodríguez, Melky Cabrera, Danny Santana, Yoenis Céspedes, Starling Marte, Brandon Moss and current Cincinnati Reds manager Terry Francona.

== Stadium ==
Estadio Cibao is nicknamed the “Valley of Death” and many fans consider it the most intimidating stadium for the other team in the country or even all the Caribbean. Estadio Cibao is known as the loudest and happiest stadium in the Caribbean. Historically the Águilas Cibaeñas have performed much better at home than on the road.

== Retired numbers ==
Miguel Diloné; OF, M Retired	Winston Llenas; 3B-2B, M Retired	Roberto Peña; SS; Retired	Franklin Taveras; SS; Retired	Felix Fermín; SS, M Retired	Tony Peña; C, M Retired
Stanley Javier; OF; Retired	Arturo Peña; P Retired	Julian Javier; 2B; Retired	Julio Martínez; 2B; Retired	Arnulfo Espinosa; P Retired	

== Current roster ==
Águilas Cibaeñas roster
Active players		Coaches/Others
Pitchers: 86 (Dominican Republic) Rodrigo Benoit; 99 (Dominican Republic) Raúl Brito; 54 (Dominican Republic) Deury Carrasco; 83 (Dominican Republic) Juan Díaz; 70 (Dominican Republic) Carlos Espinal; 72 (Dominican Republic) Jonathan Hernández; 65 (Dominican Republic) Williams Jerez; 79 (Dominican Republic) Richard Rodríguez; 91 (Dominican Republic) Edgar Sánchez; 94 (Dominican Republic) Wilmy Sánchez; 51 (Dominican Republic) José Ureña	Catchers: 59 (United States) J.C. Escarra; 68 (United States) Brett Sullivan; Infielders: 67 (Dominican Republic) Andretty Cordero; 95 (Dominican Republic) Christopher Morel; 56 (Dominican Republic) Rafael Morel; 15 (Dominican Republic) Geraldo Perdomo; 62 (Dominican Republic) Alfredo Reyes; 64 (Dominican Republic) Aderlin Rodríguez; 21 (Dominican Republic) Ramón Torres; 36 (Dominican Republic) Luis Valenzuela; 23 (Dominican Republic) Jonathan Villar; Outfielders: 35 (Dominican Republic) Alexander Canario; 0 (Dominican Republic) Jerar Encarnación; 89 (Dominican Republic) Anthony García; 58 (Dominican Republic) Erick Mejia; 66 (Dominican Republic) Yefri Pérez; 38 (Dominican Republic) Alberto Rodríguez	Manager: -- (Puerto Rico) Yadier Molina; Coaches: -- (Dominican Republic) Melky Cabrera; -- (Dominican Republic) Rafael Furcal (bench); -- (Puerto Rico) Edgardo Rivera (hitting); 4 (Dominican Republic) Miguel Tejada; -- (Venezuela) Kleininger Terán (third base); -- (Puerto Rico) Adrián Texidor (infield); Roster updated on 23 December 2024
