= 2001 Caribbean Series =

2001 baseball tournament

The forty-third edition of the Caribbean Series (Serie del Caribe) was held from February 1 through February 6 of 2001 with the champion baseball teams of the Dominican Republic, Águilas Cibaeñas; Mexico, Naranjeros de Hermosillo; Puerto Rico, Cangrejeros de Santurce, and Venezuela, Cardenales de Lara. The format consisted of 12 games, each team facing the other teams twice, and the games were played at Estadio General Ángel Flores in Culiacán, Mexico.

== Final standings ==
Country	Club	W	L	W/L %	Managers
Dominican Republic	Águilas Cibaeñas	4	2	.667	Félix Fermín
Mexico	Naranjeros de Hermosillo	3	3	.500	Derek Bryant
Venezuela	Cardenales de Lara	3	3	.500	Nick Leyva
Puerto Rico	Criollos de Caguas	2	4	.333	Sandy Alomar Sr. *

* Had to attend family issues and was replaced by coach José López.

== Individual leaders ==
Player	Statistic
Batting
Erubiel Durazo (MEX)	Batting average	.455
Six players tied	Runs	6
Erubiel Durazo (MEX)	Hits	10
Jolbert Cabrera (VEN); Luis Raven (VEN)	Doubles	4
Three players tied	Triples	1
Erubiel Durazo (MEX); Ramón Hernández (VEN)	Home runs	3
Luis Raven (VEN)	RBI	8
Trenidad Hubbard (MEX)	Stolen bases	2
Pitching
Twelve players tied	Wins	1
Daniel Garibay (MEX)	Strikeouts	10
Gary Glover (VEN)	ERA	0.00

== All-Star team ==
Name	Position
Ramón Hernández (VEN)	Catcher
Erubiel Durazo (MEX)	First baseman
Luis Sojo (VEN)	Second baseman
Vinny Castilla (MEX)	Third baseman
Miguel Tejada (DOM)	Shortstop
Luis Polonia (DOM)	Left fielder
Carlos Beltrán (PUR)	Center fielder
Gary Matthews, Jr. (PUR)	Right fielder
Juan Cañizales (MEX)	Designated hitter
Pablo Ochoa (MEX)	Right-handed pitcher
Angel Moreno (MEX)	Left-handed pitcher
Awards
Erubiel Durazo (MEX)	Most Valuable Player
Félix Fermín (DOM)	Manager

== Sources ==
- Bjarkman, Peter. Diamonds around the Globe: The Encyclopedia of International Baseball. Greenwood. ISBN 978-0-313-32268-6
- Serie del Caribe : History, Records and Statistics (Spanish)
- Estadísticas Serie del Caribe 2001 (Spanish)
