= Santiago Rosario =

Puerto Rican baseball player (1939–2013)

- First baseman / Outfielder
- Born: July 25, 1939; Guayanilla, Puerto Rico
- Died: September 6, 2013 (aged 74); Guayanilla, Puerto Rico
- Batted: Left Threw: Left

MLB debut
- June 23, 1965, for the Kansas City Athletics

Last MLB appearance
- October 3, 1965, for the Kansas City Athletics

MLB statistics
- Batting average: .235
- Home runs: 2
- Runs batted in: 8
- Stats at Baseball Reference

Teams
- Kansas City Athletics (1965)
Medals
Men's baseball
Representing Puerto Rico
Pan American Games
Silver medal – second place	1959 Chicago	Team

Santiago Rosario (July 25, 1939 – September 6, 2013) was a Puerto Rican first baseman and corner outfielder who played briefly for the Kansas City Athletics during the 1965 season. Listed at 5' 11", 165 lb., Rosario batted and threw left handed. He was born in Guayanilla, Puerto Rico.

== Career ==
At age 20 Rosario was selected for the baseball team that represented Puerto Rico at the 1959 Pan American Games held in Chicago, Illinois. This was a historical fact because it was the first time that a Puerto Rico baseball team participated in the Pan Am Games. ′′Chago′′, as his teammates dubbed him, helped offensively and defensively his team, which won a silver medal in the event as a runner-up for the Venezuelan squad.

Rosario was signed originally by the St. Louis Cardinals as an amateur free agent in 1960 and was sent to the Athletics in 1964. He hit a .235 batting average in 81 games for the Athletics, 47 of them in pinch-hitting duties.

He also spent parts of nine minor leagues spanning 1961–1971, collecting a .275 average with 49 home runs and 332 runs batted in through 1091 games. After that, he joined the Mexican League from 1973 through 1976, and also was a member of the Leones de Ponce Puerto Rican team that clinched the 1972 Caribbean Series.

Following his playing retirement, Rosario coached in the Puerto Rican league both for Ponce and the Indios de Mayagüez.

== Pacific Coast League incident ==
During his playing career, Rosario was involved in a significantly more serious sequel to the Juan Marichal–John Roseboro brawl of August 1965.

In a Pacific Coast League game played on May 11, 1966, Merritt Ranew was catching for the Seattle Angels (a California Angels affiliate club) while Jim Coates was pitching against the Vancouver Mounties (a Kansas City A's affiliate).

The incident started when Coates hurled one high and tight pitch and struck Ricardo Joseph of Vancouver on the shoulder. Then, Joseph charged the mound but, before he could get to Coates, he was tackled from behind and had his chin bloodied by Ranew. The ensuing free-for-all finally subsided, but then Vancouver's Tommie Reynolds pushed a bunt up the first base line, which forced Coates to field the ball while Reynolds tried to run the pitcher down. Once more Ranew raced to the aid of Coates. Nevertheless, Rosario dashed from the on-deck circle and hit Ranew over the head with his bat, opening up a deep 3-inch (7.6 cm) gash. Ranew suffered internal bleeding in the brain and the left side of his face was paralyzed.

Days later, PCL President Dewey Soriano fined all the participants in the incident and suspended Rosario for the remainder of the season. "Using a bat on a player is not part of baseball," Soriano stated.
