= Baseball at the 1959 Pan American Games =

Baseball at the I959 Pan American Games
- Venue: Comiskey Park & Wrigley Field; Chicago, Illinois, U.S.
- Competitors: 9 teams

Medalists
Gold medal	Venezuela
Silver medal	Puerto Rico
Bronze medal	United States

Baseball at the 1959 Pan American Games was contested between nine teams. The 1959 edition was the first Pan American Games held in the United States and the third overall. Games were held at Comiskey Park and Wrigley Field in Chicago from August 27 through September 7. This remains the only Pan American Games baseball championship won by Venezuela.

== Team summaries ==
Venezuela went 6–1 to claim the title. The team was managed by José Antonio Casanova and featured future big leaguer Dámaso Blanco. Infielder José Flores led the event with three triples while Enrique Capecchi was 2-0 pitching against Brazil and the US, also Manuel Pérez Bolaños was 2-0 on the mound, as well as 18-year-old Luis Peñalver, about to embark on a 19-year Minor League career, mostly in AAA.

Puerto Rico won Silver, thanks to a 5–1 record. Irmo Figueroa led the competition in average (.500) while Carlos Pizarro had the most hits (12). R. Vazquez led in RBI (10) and tied for the home run lead with 2.

United States won Bronze at 4–3; their 3–2 win over Cuba helped them lock up the Medal. An A. Hall, presumably Alan Hall, tied for the homer lead with two. Charles Davis had the best ERA (0.69). Future Hall Of Famer Lou Brock was 1-for-10. Another future major leaguer was outfielder Ty Cline. Third baseman Jack McCartan later won a gold medal as the goaltender for the United States hockey team at the 1960 Winter Olympics.

Cuba had a very disappointing tourney, going 2–4 and failing to take a medal, a contrast with the upcoming state-sponsored Fidel Castro era teams that won 10 Pan Am Games Gold Medals in a row. Urbano Gonzalez hit .353 and Pedro Chavez was 5-for-9.

Mexico was 5th at 3–2. Roberto Coto led the event with 5 doubles. Mauro Ruiz went 2–0, the only non-Venezuelan to post that record.

Costa Rica had one of their best events ever, going 3–3 to finish 6th. They were followed by Nicaragua (7th, 2–4) and Dominican Republic (8th, 2–3). Brazil finished last, losing all six of their games.

== Final standing ==
Place	Team
Gold	Venezuela
Silver	Puerto Rico
Bronze	United States
4	Cuba
5	Mexico
6	Costa Rica
7	Nicaragua
8	Dominican Republic
9	Brazil

1959 Pan American Games

Venezuela
First title

== Medalists ==
Event	Gold	Silver	Bronze
Men's	Venezuela: Rubén Millán; Francisco López; William Tronconis; Eduardo Amaya; Miguel Giron; José Flores; Tadeo Flores; Raúl Landaeta; Dámaso Blanco; Domingo Martín; Luis Manuel Hernández; Manuel Pérez Bolaños; Luis Peñalver; José Pérez; Lucas Ferreira; Enrique Capecchi; Francisco Oliveros	Puerto Rico: Carlos Pizarro; Santiago Rosario; Angel Fuentes; Reinaldo Vásquez; Luís Marrero; Jorge Pacheco; Ignacio Rios; Héctor Valle; José A. Meléndez; José Marrero; Irmo Figueroa; Raúl Rodríguez; Juan López; José V. Meléndez; José Calderon; Héctor Santiago; Enrique Irizarri; Ricardo Delgado	United States: Lou Brock; Ron Causton; Ty Cline; Charles Davis; Jerry Droscher; Terry Gellinger; Alan Hall; Ralph Hochgrebe; Robert Hoover; Arley Kangous; Allen Kennedy; Ron Klepfer; Jack McCartan; Perry McGriff; William Mansfield; Grayson Mersch; Tom Orton; Roger Rudeen
