= Eau de créole =

Alcoholic drink

Eau de créole is a liqueur from the distillation of the flowers of the mammee apple with spirits of wine.
