= Ty Cline =

American baseball player (born 1939)

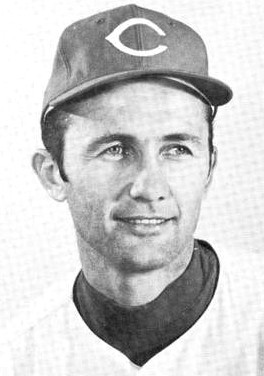
- Cline c. 1971
- Center fielder
- Born: June 15, 1939 (age 85); Hampton, South Carolina, U.S.
- Batted: Left Threw: Left

MLB debut
- September 14, 1960, for the Cleveland Indians

Last MLB appearance
- September 26, 1971, for the Cincinnati Reds

MLB statistics
- Batting average: .238
- Home runs: 6
- Runs batted in: 125
- Stats at Baseball Reference

Teams
- Cleveland Indians (1960–1962); Milwaukee Braves (1963–1965); Chicago Cubs (1966); Atlanta Braves (1966–1967); San Francisco Giants (1967–1968); Montreal Expos (1969–1970); Cincinnati Reds (1970–1971)
Medals
Men's baseball
Representing United States
Pan American Games
Bronze medal – third place	1959 Chicago	Team

Tyrone Alexander Cline (born June 15, 1939) is an American former professional baseball player, primarily a reserve outfielder and pinch hitter, who played in Major League Baseball (MLB) for the Cleveland Indians (1960–62), Milwaukee / Atlanta Braves (1963–65, 1966–67), Chicago Cubs (1966), San Francisco Giants (1967–68), Montreal Expos (1969–70) and Cincinnati Reds (1970–71). He threw and batted left-handed and was listed as 6 feet (1.8 m) tall and 170 pounds (77 kg).

== Early life ==
Cline was born in Hampton, South Carolina, graduated from Charleston's St. Andrew's Parish High School, and went on to play college baseball for Clemson University in the Atlantic Coast Conference for three seasons. Cline attained All-American status during his college career, while appearing as both an outfielder and a starting pitcher.

== Baseball career ==
In 1960, following his junior year, he left Clemson, signing a professional baseball contract with the Cleveland Indians. He spent his first season at Double-A Mobile of the Southern Association, batting .311 with 118 hits. Recalled by Cleveland in September, he debuted in MLB on September 14 by singling off veteran Frank Sullivan and later tripling off southpaw Ted Wills, scoring two runs in an 11–7 win over the Boston Red Sox. He had another strong minor-league season in 1961 at Triple-A Salt Lake City, followed by a September audition with the Indians. In 1962, he became the Indians' regular center fielder in a platoon with right-handed hitter Willie Tasby, batting .248 in 118 games with 93 hits.

The following March, Cline was the "player to be named later" in a swap that had occurred the previous November 21, when the Indians obtained veteran first baseman Joe Adcock in a five-player trade with the Milwaukee Braves. Cline then spent the rest of his career in the National League in part-time and backup outfielder roles with five clubs over nine years. He was acquired by the Reds from the Expos for Clyde Mashore before the trade deadline on June 15, 1970.

=== 1970 NLCS and World Series ===
Cline was instrumental in helping the Reds defeat the Pittsburgh Pirates in the 1970 National League Championship Series, tripling and scoring the winning run in the 10th inning of the first game. He went on to score the game-winning and pennant-clinching run, after an eighth-inning walk in game three.

Cline appeared as a pinch hitter in each of the first three games of the 1970 World Series against the Baltimore Orioles, his lone hit being a leadoff single off reliever Moe Drabowsky, in the seventh inning of Game 2 at Cincinnati’s Riverfront Stadium. Cline also set into motion the most controversial play of the Series in Game 1. He pinch hit for Woody Woodward with Tommy Helms at first, Bernie Carbo at third, one out, and the score tied at three in the sixth linning. Cline reached safely on a Baltimore chop. Orioles’ starter Jim Palmer, while running toward home plate, immediately signaled to catcher Elrod Hendricks that Carbo was trying to score from third. Hendricks fielded the ball barehanded, spun around to his left and lunged toward an oncoming Carbo in an attempt to tag him out but collided with umpire Ken Burkhart who, while positioning himself to judge whether the batted ball was fair, accidentally blocked the runner's path to home plate. Carbo slid around Burkhart on the outside but missed touching the plate. With his back to the play and after being knocked down, Burkhart ruled Carbo out even though Hendricks made the tag with his mitt while holding the ball in his bare hand. Having not been properly tagged out, Carbo unknowingly stepped on the plate as he was arguing, but the play was dead once Burkhart made his call.

Cline officially retired from baseball following the 1971 season. In retirement, he owned and managed a Baskin-Robbins ice cream restaurant franchise.

== Career stat line ==
In 12 big league seasons, Cline played in 892 games, had 1,834 at bats, scored 251 runs, posted 437 hits, 53 doubles, 25 triples, six home runs, 125 runs batted in (RBI), 22 stolen bases, 153 walks, a .238 batting average, a .304 on-base percentage, a .304 slugging percentage, 558 total bases, 27 sacrifice hits, four sacrifice flies, and was issued five intentional walks.
