= Héctor Valle =

Puerto Rican baseball player (1940–2026)

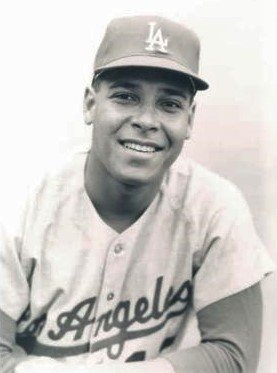
- Catcher
- Born: October 27, 1940; Vega Baja, Puerto Rico
- Died: July 11, 2026 (aged 85); Cabo Rojo, Puerto Rico
- Batted: Right Threw: Right

MLB debut
- June 6, 1965, for the Los Angeles Dodgers

Last MLB appearance
- October 3, 1965, for the Los Angeles Dodgers

MLB statistics
- Batting average: .308
- Home runs: 0
- Runs batted in: 2
- Stats at Baseball Reference

Teams
- Los Angeles Dodgers (1965)
Medals
Men's baseball
Representing Puerto Rico
Pan American Games
| Silver medal – second place | 1959 Chicago | Team |

Héctor Jose Valle (October 27, 1940 – July 11, 2026) was a Puerto Rican professional baseball catcher, who played in Major League Baseball (MLB) for the Los Angeles Dodgers.

== Professional career ==
Valle was signed by the Los Angeles Dodgers as an amateur free agent in 1960. His MLB career consists of the nine games he played for the 1965 Dodgers, appearing six times behind the plate. Valle batted .308 (4-for-13), scoring one run, with two runs batted in (RBI), and achieving an on-base percentage of .400. Defensively, he handled 21 chances flawlessly for a fielding percentage of 1.000.

His four major league hits (all singles) came against Denny Lemaster, Bob Veale, and Bob Sadowski.

Valle was later acquired by the New York Mets and Detroit Tigers, but never again appeared in another regular season big league game. He played in several other farm systems and the Mexican League, finally hanging up his spikes following the 1981 season.

== Death ==
Valle died in Cabo Rojo, Puerto Rico on July 11, 2026, at the age of 85.

== See also ==
- List of Major League Baseball players from Puerto Rico
