= Tony Barron =

American baseball player

- Right fielder
- Born: August 17, 1966 (age 59); Portland, Oregon
- Batted: Right Threw: Right

MLB debut
- June 2, 1996, for the Montreal Expos

Last MLB appearance
- September 28, 1997, for the Philadelphia Phillies

MLB statistics
- Batting average: .284
- Home runs: 4
- Runs batted in: 24
- Stats at Baseball Reference

Teams
- Montreal Expos (1996); Philadelphia Phillies (1997)

Anthony Dirk Barron (born August 17, 1966) is an American former Major League Baseball player. Drafted by the Los Angeles Dodgers in the 7th round of the 1987 Major League Baseball draft. Barron played for the Montreal Expos in 1995 as a replacement player. He made the full roster the next season to play the following year in 1996, and later the Philadelphia Phillies in 1997.
