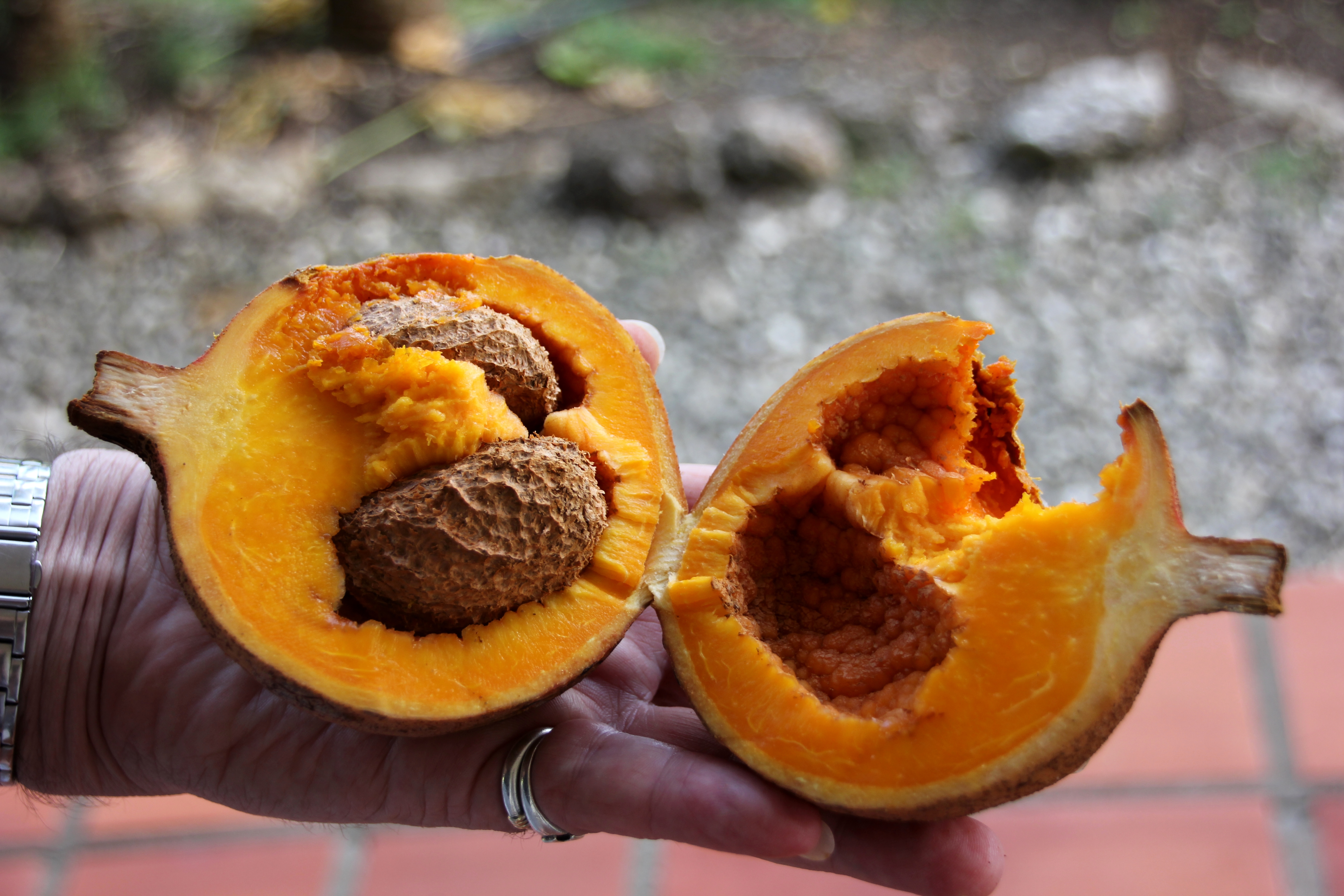
- Full and longitudinally-cut mammee apples

Conservation status
- Data Deficient (IUCN 3.1)

- Secure (NatureServe)

Scientific classification
- Kingdom: Plantae
- Clade: Tracheophytes
- Clade: Angiosperms
- Clade: Eudicots
- Clade: Rosids
- Order: Malpighiales
- Family: Calophyllaceae
- Genus: Mammea
- Species: M. americana

Binomial name
- Mammea americana L.

= Mammea americana =

Mammee apple

Species of tree

Mammea americana, commonly known as mammee, mammee apple, mammey, mamey, mamey apple, Santo Domingo apricot, tropical apricot, or South American apricot, is an evergreen tree of the family Calophyllaceae, whose fruit is edible. It has also been classified as belonging to the family Guttiferae Juss. (1789), which would make it a relative of the mangosteen.

In certain Latin American countries, Mammea americana is referred to as "yellow mamey" (Spanish: mamey amarillo) to distinguish it from the unrelated but similar-looking Pouteria sapota, whose fruit is usually called "red mamey" (mamey colorado or mamey rojo).

== Description ==
=== Tree ===
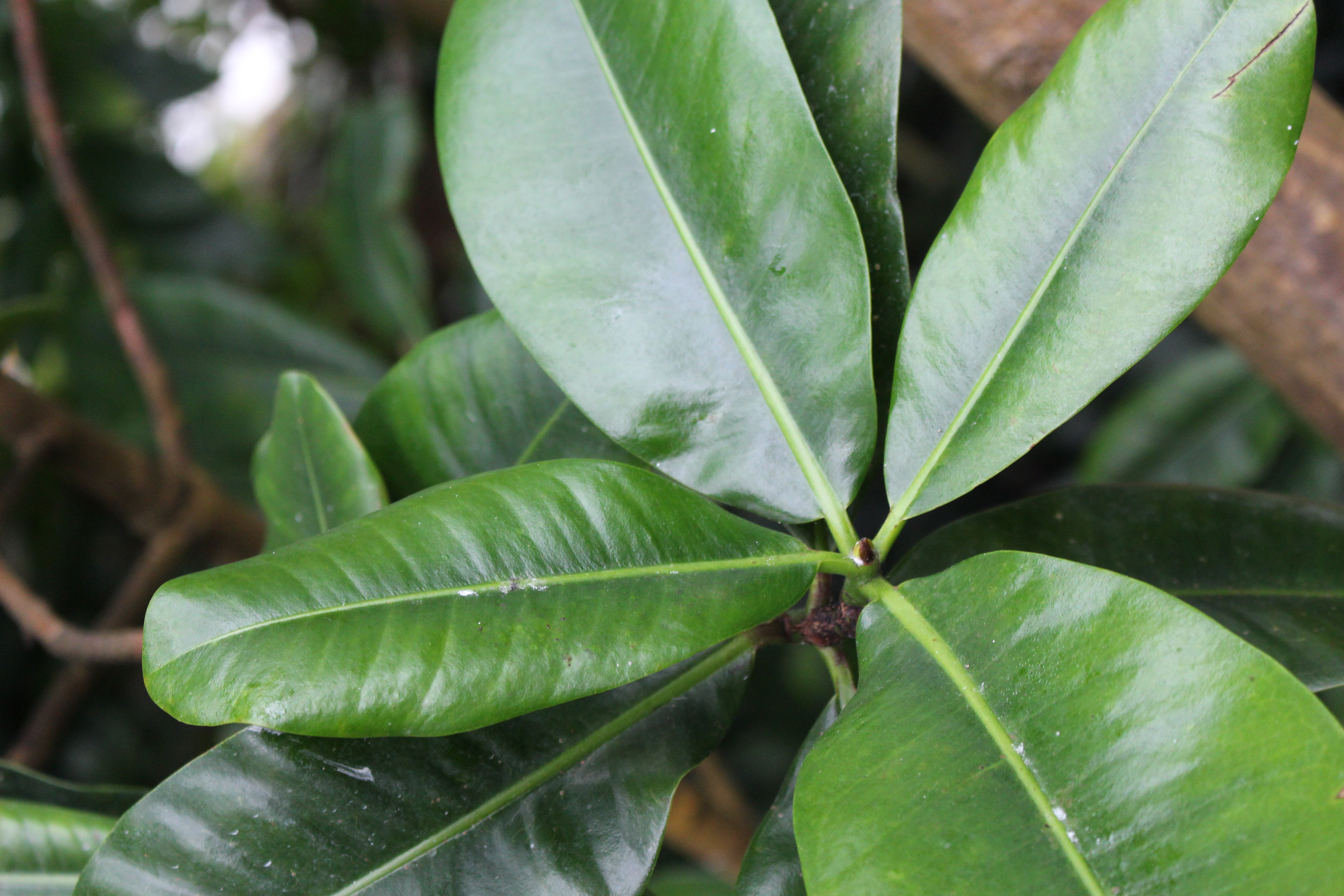
leaves

The mammee tree is 18–21 m (59–69 ft) high and is similar in appearance to the southern magnolia (Magnolia grandiflora). Its trunk is short and reaches 1.9–2.2 m (6 ft 3 in – 7 ft 3 in) in diameter. The tree's upright branches form an oval head. Its dark-green foliage is quite dense, with opposite, leathery, elliptical leaves. The leaves can reach 10 cm (3.9 in) wide and twice as long.

The mammee flower is fragrant, has four or six white petals, and reaches 2.5–4.0 cm (0.98–1.57 in) wide when fully blossomed. The flowers are borne either singly or in clusters of two or three, on short stalks. A single flower can have pistils, stamens, or both, so flowers can be male, female or hermaphrodite on one tree.

=== Fruit ===
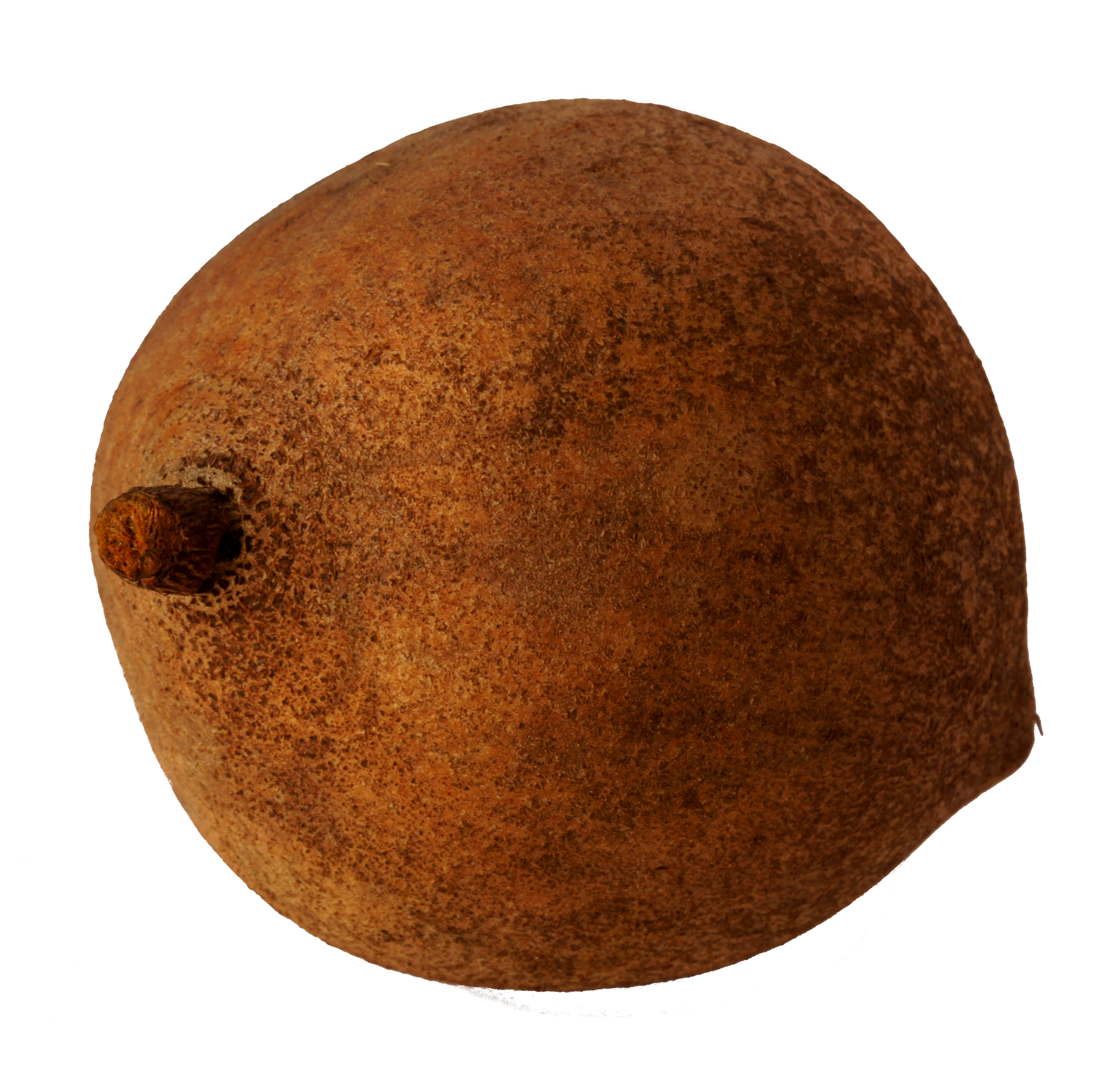
A mammee apple

The mammee apple is a berry, though it is often misinterpreted to be a drupe. It is round or slightly irregular, with a brown or grey-brown 3-mm-thick rind. In fact, the rind consists of the exocarp and mesocarp of the fruit, while the pulp is formed from the endocarp. The stem is thick and short. The mammee apple has more or less visible floral remnant at the apex.

Mammee apples' diameters range from 10 to 20 cm (3.9 to 7.9 in). When unripe, the fruit is hard and heavy, but its flesh slightly softens when fully ripe. Beneath the skin is a white, dry membrane, whose taste is astringent, and adheres to the flesh. The flesh is orange or yellow, not fibrous, and can have various textures (crispy or juicy, firm, or tender). Generally, the flesh smell is pleasant and appetizing.

Small fruit contain a single seed, while larger ones might have up to four. The seeds are brown, rough, and oval, and around 6 cm (2.4 in) long, but seeds up to 8 cm (3.1 in) long have been recorded. The juice of the seed leaves an indelible stain.

=== Propagation ===
Propagation can be done by seed. Germination takes place from 60 to 260 days. Grafting is the preferred method of propagation.

== Distribution and habitat ==
Native to the Caribbean the tree is also widely cultivated in the tropics and Central America. In Haiti the fruit is known as zabriko or abricot. In 1529, it was included by Oviedo in his Review of the Fruits of the New World. It was then introduced to various regions in the Old World: West Africa, particularly Sierra Leone, Zanzibar, Southeast Asia, and Hawaii. In the United States, the species is uniquely found in Hawaii and Florida. In the latter state, mammee apples were probably introduced from the Bahamas.

The mammea apple tree is confined to tropical or subtropical climates. In Central America, the species is found to grow up to an altitude of 1,000 m. It thrives best in rich, deep, and well-drained soil, but is very adaptive; it also grows on limestone in Jamaica, in the oolithic limestone of the Bahamas, and on ancient coral bedrock in Barbados, as well as coral cays off the coast of Florida.

The tree is very sensitive to low temperatures, but seems remarkably resistant to pests and diseases.

== Uses ==
Mammy-apple, (mamey), raw
Nutritional value per 100 g (3.5 oz)
- Energy: 213 kJ (51 kcal)
- Carbohydrates: 12.5 g
- Dietary fiber: 3 g
- Fat: 0.5 g
- Protein: 0.5 g
Vitamins and minerals
Vitamins	Quantity %DV^{†}
Vitamin A equiv.	1% 12 μg
Thiamine (B1)	2% 0.02 mg
Riboflavin (B2)	3% 0.04 mg
Niacin (B3)	3% 0.4 mg
Pantothenic acid (B5)	2% 0.103 mg
Vitamin B6	6% 0.1 mg
Folate (B9)	4% 14 μg
Vitamin C	16% 14 mg
Minerals	Quantity %DV^{†}
Calcium	1% 11 mg
Iron	4% 0.7 mg
Magnesium	4% 16 mg
Phosphorus	1% 11 mg
Potassium	2% 47 mg
Sodium	1% 15 mg
Zinc	1% 0.1 mg
- Link to USDA Database entry
- ^{†}Percentages estimated using US recommendations for adults, except for potassium, which is estimated based on expert recommendation from the National Academies.

=== Traditional medicine ===
In parts of the Caribbean and South America during the 20th century, mammee was used in traditional medicine.

=== Culinary interest ===
Though edible, this fruit has received little attention worldwide.

The raw flesh can be served in fruit salads, or with wine, sugar, or cream, especially in Jamaica. In the Bahamas, the flesh is first put in salted water to remove its bitterness, before cooking it with much sugar to make a sort of jam. The flesh can also be consumed stewed.

In the French West Indies, an aromatic liqueur, eau créole, or crème créole, is distilled from the mammee flowers. This liqueur is believed to be tonic or digestive.

=== Other ===
Various parts of the tree contain insecticidal substances, especially the seed kernel. In Puerto Rico, mammee leaves are wrapped around young tomato plants to keep mole crickets and cutworms away. In a similar way, the bark gum is melted with fat in Jamaica and Mexico, then applied to the feet to repel chiggers or fleas on animals. The same effect is also obtained from infusions of half-ripe fruits.

In the Virgin Islands, the tannin from the bark is used to tan leather. The mammee timber is heavy and hard, yet easy to work; it has received, however, only limited commercial interest.
