= Santiago Guzmán =

Argentine rugby union player (born 1989)

- Born: Santiago Guzmán; January 11, 1989 (age 37) San Miguel de Tucumán, Argentina
- Height: 1.97 m (6 ft 6 in)
- Weight: 110 kg (17 st 5 lb)

Rugby union career
- Position: Lock
Senior career
Years	Team	Apps	(Points)
- Tucumán RC
2010–12	Pampas XV	12	(0)
- Correct as of 25 September 2012
International career
Years	Team	Apps	(Points)
2010–	Argentina	6	(0)
- Correct as of 25 September 2012

Santiago Guzmán (born January 11, 1989, in San Miguel de Tucumán, Argentina) is an Argentine rugby union player. He plays in the lock position. In May 2010, he was selected in a squad of over 40 players to represent Argentina in the two test Summer tour of Argentina. He has previously captained the Argentina U20 team. He join the Stade Français (Paris) in June 2010.

== See also ==
- Argentina Rugby Union
