= Álvaro Espinoza =

Venezuelan baseball player (born 1962)

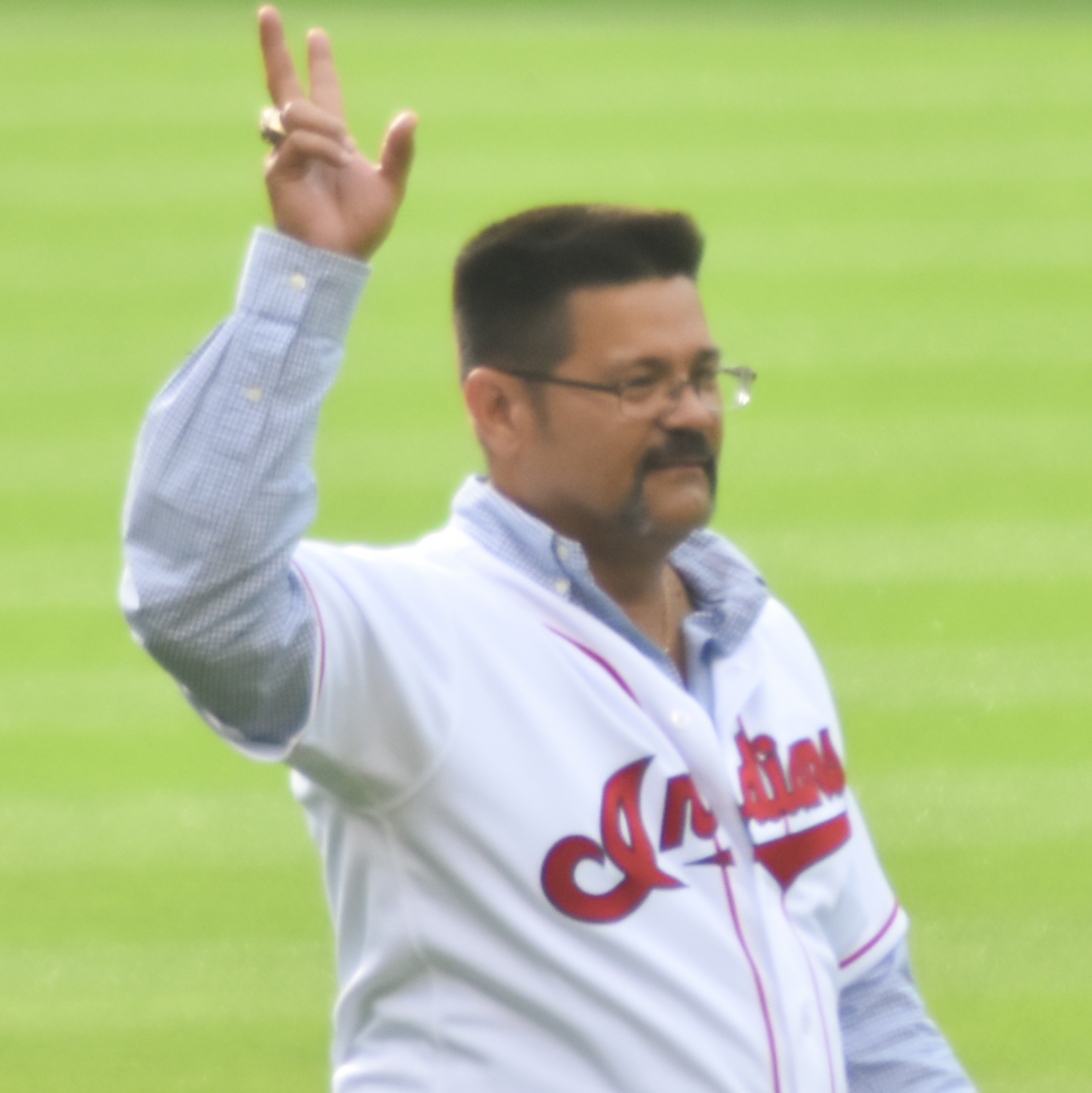
- Espinoza at Progressive Field in 2015
- Shortstop
- Born: February 19, 1962 (age 64); Valencia, Carabobo State, Venezuela
- Batted: Right Threw: Right

MLB debut
- September 14, 1984, for the Minnesota Twins

Last MLB appearance
- July 12, 1997, for the Seattle Mariners

MLB statistics
- Batting average: .254
- Home runs: 22
- Runs batted in: 201
- Stats at Baseball Reference

Teams
- Minnesota Twins (1984–1986); New York Yankees (1988–1991); Cleveland Indians (1993–1996); New York Mets (1996); Seattle Mariners (1997)

Member of the Caribbean

Baseball Hall of Fame
- Induction: 2014

Álvaro Alberto Espinoza Ramírez [es-pe-noh'-zah] (born February 19, 1962) is a Venezuelan former professional baseball shortstop. He played in Major League Baseball (MLB) for the Minnesota Twins, New York Yankees, Cleveland Indians, New York Mets, and Seattle Mariners. He batted and threw right-handed.

== Early life ==
Born in Valencia, Carabobo, he graduated from Pedro Gual High School where he played baseball, soccer and basketball.

== Playing career ==
As a young prospect, Espinoza was let go by the Houston Astros system. But he went on to have twelve decent seasons with the Minnesota Twins (1984–1986), New York Yankees (1988–1991), Cleveland Indians (1993–1996), New York Mets (1996) and Seattle Mariners (1997).

In a 12-season career, Espinoza hit a .254 average with 22 home runs and 201 RBI in 942 games, including 252 runs, 105 doubles, nine triples, and 13 stolen bases.

Espinoza's was one of New York Yankees public address announcer Bob Sheppard's favorite names to announce.

He was also noted for his bubble gum hat antics, as well as other practical jokes he and teammate Wayne Kirby used to play on the 1995 Cleveland Indians.

== Coaching career ==
Following his playing career after the 1997 season, Espinoza turned to coaching. In 1998, he worked with the Montreal Expos as their minor league infield coordinator.

Hired by the Los Angeles Dodgers organization, Espinoza made his managerial debut in 1999 and guided the Single-A Vero Beach Dodgers to a 48–85 record in the Florida State League. He spent 2000 and 2001 as the Dodgers' Minor League roving infield coordinator.

In 2002, Espinoza was signed by the Pittsburgh Pirates and then named their infield instructor in 2004.

On March 3, 2023, Espinoza was hired by the Tecolotes de los Dos Laredos of the Mexican League to serve as the team's hitting and third base coach. He was replaced following the hiring of Endy Chávez on January 8, 2024.

== See also ==
- List of Major League Baseball players from Venezuela
