= Darryl Brinkley =

American baseball player & coach (born 1968)

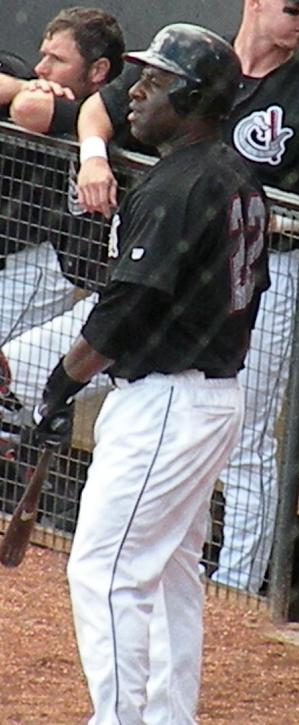
- Brinkley with the Calgary Vipers in 2008

Saraperos de Saltillo
- Outfielder / Coach / Manager
- Born: December 23, 1968 (age 57); Stamford, Connecticut, U.S.
- Batted: Right Threw: Right

Professional debut
- KBO: 2000, for the Hyundai Unicorns
- CPBL: August 9, 2005, for the Uni-President Lions

Last appearance
- KBO: 2000, for the Hyundai Unicorns
- CPBL: October 18, 2005, for the Uni-President Lions

KBO statistics
- Batting average: .209
- Home runs: 3
- Runs batted in: 14

CPBL statistics
- Batting average: .323
- Home runs: 6
- Runs batted in: 30
- Stats at Baseball Reference

Teams
- Hyundai Unicorns (2000); Uni-President Lions (2005)

Member of the Caribbean

Baseball Hall of Fame
- Induction: 2018

Darryl Maurice Brinkley (born December 23, 1968) is an American former professional baseball outfielder who currently serves as the hitting coach for the Saraperos de Saltillo of the Mexicaj League. He played in the KBO League for the Hyundai Unicorns in 2000, and in the Chinese Professional Baseball League (CPBL) for the Uni-President Lions in 2005. In 2007, he became the first player in Northern League history to bat .400. A journeyman minor leaguer, his one chance at playing in the majors was prevented by the September 11, 2001 terrorist attacks.

== Playing career ==
Brinkley graduated from Sacred Heart University in 1991, however was not drafted by any Major League Baseball team despite batting .528 in his senior year. Brinkley instead played in the Netherlands and Italy for three years before signing with the Winnipeg Goldeyes of the independent Northern League. Brinkley had an outstanding winter season playing in the Mexican Pacific League in 1996 where he was named Baseball America's Winter Player of the year, as well as MVP of the Caribbean Series.

Brinkley's winter success attracted the attention of the San Diego Padres, who signed him for the 1996 season at the age of 27. Assigned to the Single-A Rancho Cucamonga Quakes, Brinkley batted .363 and was named a California League All-Star. After spending two seasons in the Padres organization, Brinkley was dealt to the Pittsburgh Pirates, where he played for the Triple-A Nashville Sounds, and then the Rochester Red Wings of the Baltimore Orioles organization.

It was with the Orioles organization in 2001 that Brinkley nearly reached the major leagues. When he was not recalled by the Orioles when the roster expanded on September 1, 2001, Brinkley flew to Australia at the conclusion of the International League season. The Orioles recalled Brinkley on September 10; however, Brinkley was stranded in Australia due to the September 11, 2001 attacks. By the time Brinkley was able to return to the United States, the Orioles had instead recalled Tim Raines Jr. in his place. Brinkley would not get another opportunity to play in the majors despite playing in the Triple-A All-Star game in 2002. Brinkley would be granted free agency by the Orioles following the 2002 season.

Since 2003, Brinkley has bounced around Independent league baseball, playing in the Northeast League, Atlantic League and Northern League, where he landed with the Calgary Vipers in 2006. Brinkley's greatest success to date came with the Vipers in 2007, where he became the first player in Northern League history to finish the season with a .400 batting average. Brinkley also led the league in runs and on-base percentage, while his 150 hits also set a league record. Brinkley was also named Baseball America's 2007 Independent League Player of the Year.

Through 2007, Brinkley is a career .329 hitter, having played in over 1,500 games. Brinkley is in his third season with the Vipers, now playing in the Golden Baseball League for the 2008 season, his 15th professional season. In 2009, Brinkley signed a contract with the Edmonton Capitals of the Golden Baseball League.

== Coaching career ==
In 2010, Brinkley served as manager of the Yuma Scorpions in the Golden Baseball League.

From 2011 to 2013 Brinkley was the hitting coach for Tigres de Quintana Roo in the Mexican League. In 2014, he was the hitting for the Broncos de Reynosa.

In 2015, Brinkley was hired as the hitting coach for the Ogden Raptors. In 2016, Brinkley was the hitting coach in the Dominican Republic with the Cincinnati Reds organization. In 2017, he was the Bench coach in Triple-A for the Louisville Bats, Cincinnati's Triple-A affiliate. He was named the hitting coach for the Dayton Dragons prior to the 2020 season.

On November 14, 2025, Brinkley was appointed as the manager for the Pericos de Puebla of the Mexican League. He was fired on May 22, 2026, despite the team having a 17–13 record and being tied for second place in the South division.

On June 2, 2026, the Saraperos de Saltillo hired Brinkley to serve as the team's hitting coach.
