= Dámaso Blanco =

Venezuelan baseball player (born 1941)

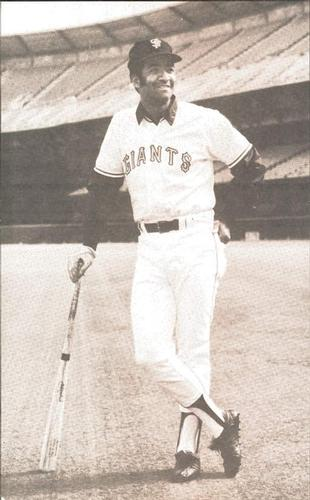
- Third baseman
- Born: December 11, 1941 (age 84); Curiepe, Venezuela
- Batted: Right Threw: Right

MLB debut
- May 26, 1972, for the San Francisco Giants

Last MLB appearance
- June 2, 1974, for the San Francisco Giants

MLB statistics
- Batting average: .212
- Home runs: 0
- Runs batted in: 2
- Stats at Baseball Reference

Teams
- San Francisco Giants (1972–1974)

Member of the Venezuelan

Baseball Hall of Fame
- Induction: 2014
Medals
Men's baseball
Representing Venezuela
Pan American Games
Gold medal – first place	1959 Chicago	Team

Dámaso Blanco Caripe (born December 11, 1941) is a Venezuelan former Major League Baseball (MLB) third baseman and shortstop and right-handed batter who played for the San Francisco Giants (1972–74). In 1977, at the age of 36, he retired from baseball and began serving as a scout for the Cincinnati Reds for a short period of time. On his return to Venezuela, he began a successful career as commentator in the media.

== Life and career ==
Blanco was the classic example of the fine fielder with a light bat. He was a decent hitter in the minors, where his batting and on-base averages were both quite respectable. He was 7-for-20 (.350) in 1972 (his first two hits coming in the same game, against Tom Phoebus of the Chicago Cubs on June 11), but was 0-for-15 in his last times at bat, 0-for-13 in limited opportunities the next two seasons.

In parts of three seasons as a backup with the Giants, Blanco hit .212 (7-for-33) with two runs batted in, nine runs, one double and 3 stolen bases in 72 games. In the field he handled 46 of 48 total chances successfully (.958) and participated in 3 double plays.

He resumed his career in the Venezuela League, hitting .268 (704-for-2623) with 198 RBI, 289 runs, 72 doubles, 28 triples, 0 home run and 70 steals in 754 games (1960–77).

After retiring at age 36, Blanco scouted briefly for the Cincinnati Reds before beginning a successful career as a journalist and baseball broadcaster in his native Venezuela.

In 2014, Blanco gained induction in the Venezuelan Baseball Hall of Fame and Museum. He was inducted as well in the Hall in 2015, when the entire 1959 Pan American Games champion team was honored.

== See also ==
- List of players from Venezuela in Major League Baseball
