= Luis Raven =

Venezuelan baseball player (born 1968)

- First baseman / Third baseman / Left fielder
- Born: November 19, 1968 (age 57); La Guaira, Vargas, Venezuela
- Bats: Right Throws: Right
- Stats at Baseball Reference

Member of the Caribbean

Baseball Hall of Fame
- Induction: 2023

Luis Alberto Raven Enríquez (born November 19, 1968) is a Venezuelan former professional baseball outfielder. Listed at 6'0" (1.84 m.), 185 lb. (84 k.), Raven batted and threw right handed. He was born in La Guaira, Vargas.

Raven (rah'-vehn) was a powerful hitter known for his long home runs, but he also struck out frequently and usually posted a low batting average and on-base percentage.

== Career ==
He spent 19 years in baseball, while playing in the California Angels, Chicago White Sox, Cleveland Indians and Florida Marlins minor league systems. Besides, he played in Mexican, Italian and Taiwanese baseball, as well as in the Venezuelan Professional Baseball League.

In 15 minor league seasons, he posted a .288 batting average with 197 home runs and 838 RBI in 1151 games, including 2118 total bases for a .494 slugging average.

Raven played from 1991 through 2007 in the Venezuela league, gaining honors as Rookie of the Year in the 1993–1994 season, Most Valuable Offensive Player in 1997–1998 and 1998–1999, and Most Valuable Player in 1998–1999.

Overall, he hit .267 with 94 homers and 401 RBI in 703 games, while collecting 319 runs, 123 doubles, eight triples and 21 stolen bases. In between, he made the Caribbean Series All-Star team in the 1997 and 2001 tournaments.

Raven suffered a stroke in January 2014. He has recovered since then.

== Sources ==
- Gutiérrez, Daniel; Alvarez, Efraim; Gutiérrez (h), Daniel (2006). La Enciclopedia del Béisbol en Venezuela. LVBP, Caracas. ISBN 980-6996-02-X
