= Guillermo García (baseball) =

Dominican baseball player (born 1972)

- Catcher
- Born: April 4, 1972 (age 54); Santiago, Dominican Republic
- Batted: Right Threw: Right

MLB debut
- July 19, 1998, for the Cincinnati Reds

Last MLB appearance
- April 11, 1999, for the Florida Marlins

MLB statistics
- Batting average: .200
- Home runs: 2
- runs batted in: 4
- Stats at Baseball Reference

Teams
- Cincinnati Reds (1998); Florida Marlins (1999)

Guillermo Antonio García Morel (born April 4, 1972) is a Dominican former Major League Baseball (MLB) catcher. He played for the Cincinnati Reds in 1998 and the Florida Marlins in 1999.
