= Endy Chávez =

Venezuelan baseball player (born 1978)

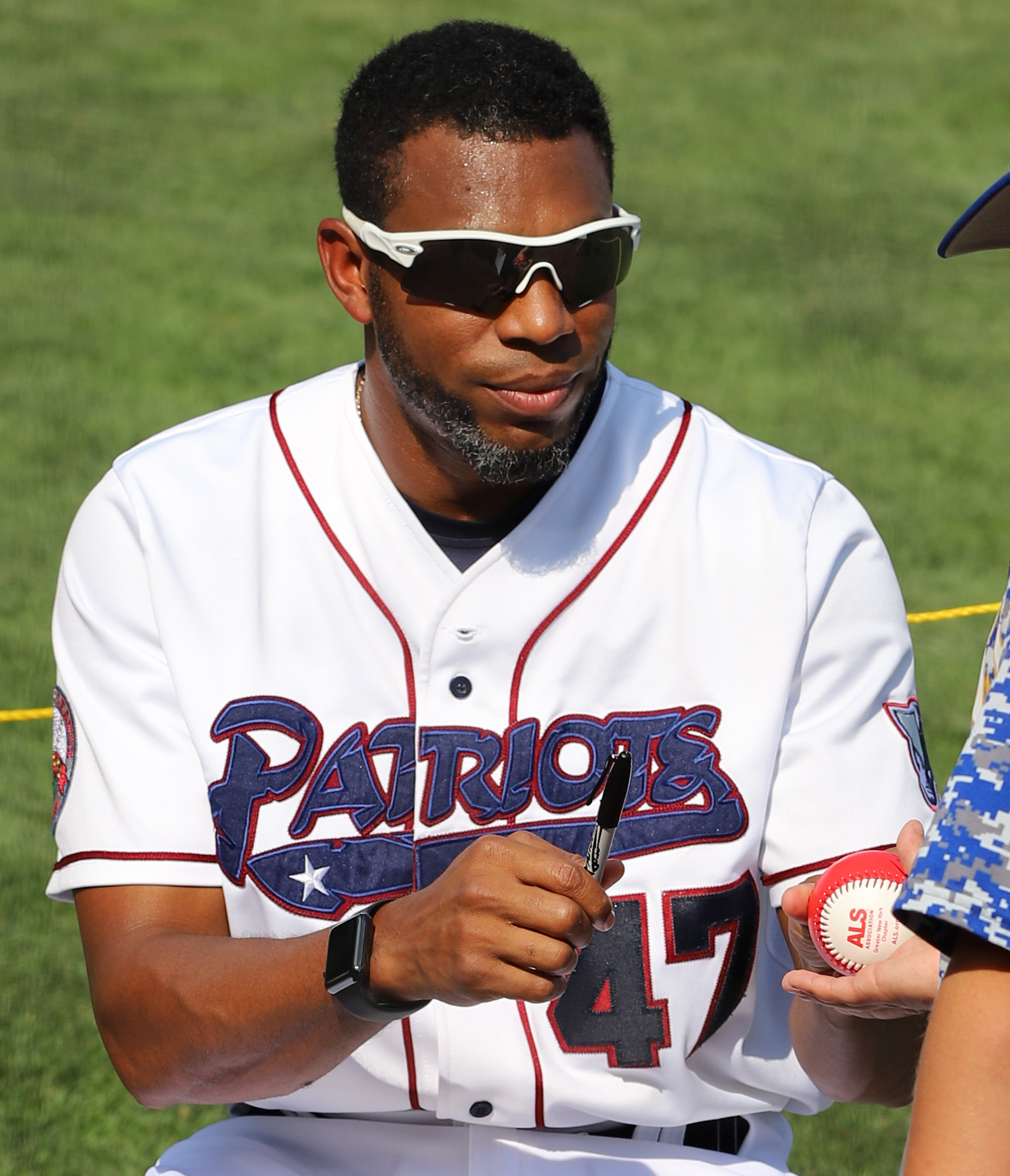
- Chávez with the Somerset Patriots in 2018
- Outfielder
- Born: February 7, 1978 (age 48); Valencia, Venezuela
- Batted: Left Threw: Left

MLB debut
- May 29, 2001, for the Kansas City Royals

Last MLB appearance
- September 27, 2014, for the Seattle Mariners

MLB statistics
- Batting average: .270
- Home runs: 30
- Runs batted in: 266
- Stats at Baseball Reference

Teams
- Kansas City Royals (2001); Montreal Expos / Washington Nationals (2002–2005); Philadelphia Phillies (2005); New York Mets (2006–2008); Seattle Mariners (2009); Texas Rangers (2011); Baltimore Orioles (2012); Seattle Mariners (2013–2014)

Member of the Venezuelan

Baseball Hall of Fame
- Induction: 2026
- Vote: 76%
- Election method: Contemporary Committee

Endy de Jesus Chávez Meza (/ˈtʃɑːvɛz/; born February 7, 1978) is a Venezuelan former professional baseball outfielder. He played in Major League Baseball (MLB) for the Kansas City Royals, Montreal Expos / Washington Nationals, Philadelphia Phillies, New York Mets, Seattle Mariners, Texas Rangers, and Baltimore Orioles.

== Early life ==
Chávez was born in Valencia, Venezuela where his father, Alirio, worked as a handyman. Growing up in Venezuela, he honed his hand-eye coordination by hitting pebbles out of the air with sticks. He initially drew attention from Colorado Rockies scouts at 18 years old but, when their interest wavered due to his slight stature, he signed with the New York Mets.

== Career ==
=== Minor league ===
Chávez made his Minor League Baseball debut in 1997 with the Gulf Coast League Mets, a rookie-level affiliate of the New York Mets. He remained in the Mets organization through 2000, spending time with the Kingsport Mets, Gulf Coast Mets, Capital City Bombers, and St. Lucie Mets. On December 11, 2000, Chávez was claimed by the Kansas City Royals in the 2000 Rule 5 draft. On March 30, 2001, Chávez was returned to the Mets and then traded to the Royals for minor league outfielder Michael Curry. He played for the AA Wichita Wranglers and the AAA Omaha Royals before making his major league debut with the Royals on May 29, 2001.

=== Montreal Expos / Washington Nationals ===
In the winter of 2001, Chávez was waived by the Royals and then claimed and waived by both the Mets and Detroit Tigers before being claimed by the Montreal Expos where he played in 309 games over three years (2002–05) while splitting time at AAA Ottawa and Edmonton. Playing full-time for the Expos in 2003 and 2004, Chávez batted first in the lineup and started in center field, stealing 18 bases in 2003 and 32 in 2004. On October 3, 2004, Chávez recorded the final out in Expos history in their 8–1 loss to the Mets at Shea Stadium. In 2005 Chávez played in only seven games in the majors for the now-relocated Washington Nationals, before being traded to the Philadelphia Phillies for fellow outfielder Marlon Byrd. During his tenure in Washington, Chávez was given the mocking nickname of "Inning Endy" by Nationals' fansites, due to his tendency to swing away rather than work the count in his favor, which often resulted in groundouts and popups to end the Nationals innings.

=== Philadelphia Phillies ===
Chávez spent the rest of the 2005 season with the Philadelphia Phillies and appeared in 91 games with 107 at-bats and hit only .215. At the end of the season, Chávez became a free agent for the first time and signed one year, $500,000 contract with the Mets on December 23, 2005.

=== New York Mets ===
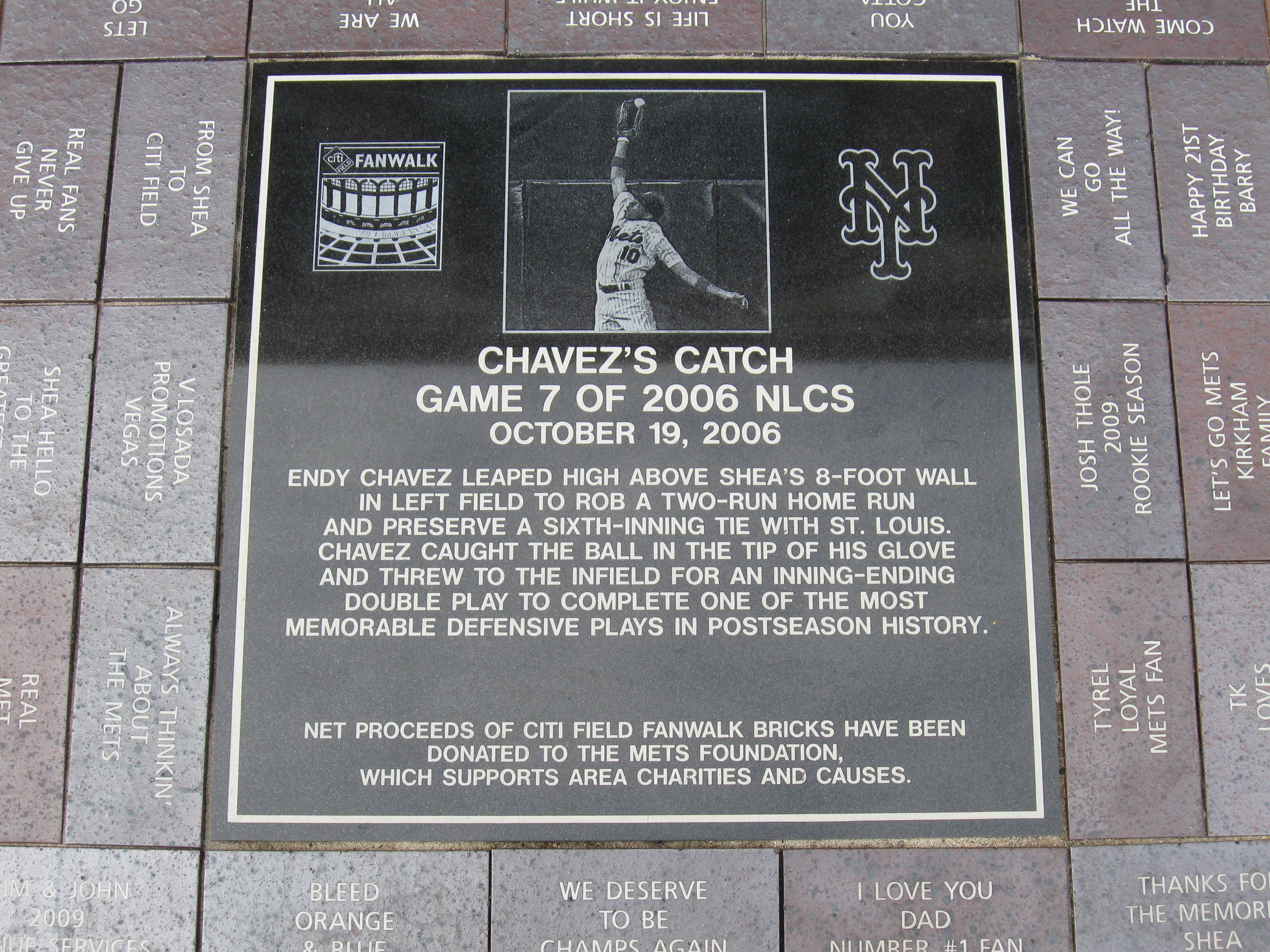
Plaque outside Citi Field honoring Chávez's catch in the 2006 NLCS

During spring training, Mets manager Willie Randolph worked with Chávez to improve his hitting. Chávez's speed and his modified batting style sparked a 90-point jump in his batting average over the previous season (hitting .306 in 353 at-bats) as the Mets' fourth outfielder (often as an injury replacement for regular left fielder Cliff Floyd). His improved hitting and excellent defensive skills contributed to the Mets winning the National League East.

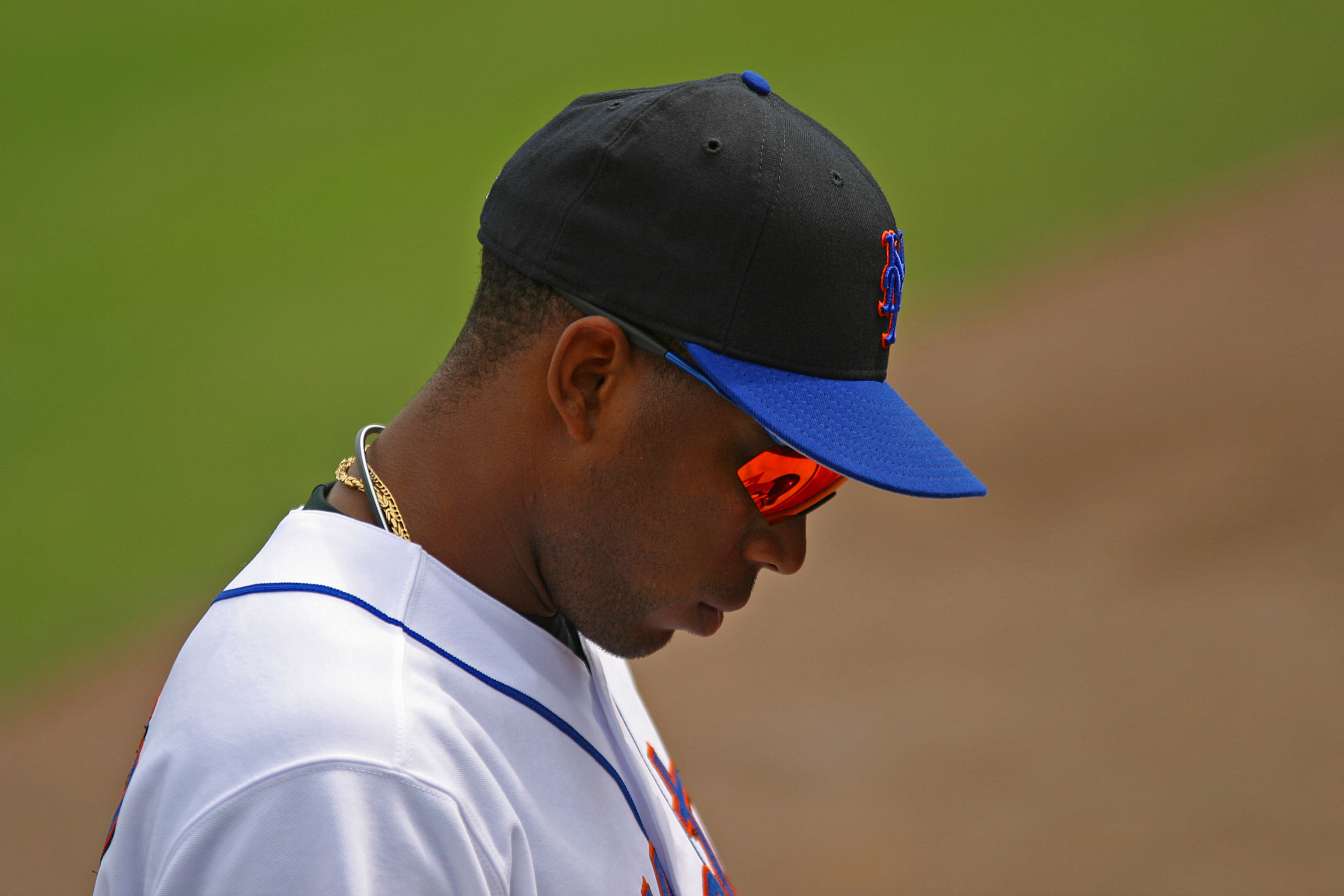
Chávez signs autographs in 2007.

Chávez's signature moment came at Shea Stadium in Game 7 of the 2006 National League Championship Series. In the top of the sixth inning, with the game tied, 1–1, Cardinals third baseman Scott Rolen hit a pitch off Mets starter Óliver Pérez. Leaping over the 8-foot-high (2.4 m) left field wall, Chávez caught the ball with the tip of his glove to rob Rolen of a two-run home run. Chávez then threw to cutoff man second baseman José Valentín, who threw to Carlos Delgado at first base to double off Cardinals center fielder Jim Edmonds for an inning-ending double play. Although the Mets went on to lose the game and the series, "The Catch" was named the top post-season moment in the fifth annual This Year in Baseball Awards. On July 13, 2007, American International Group (the company whose left field advertisement was where Chávez made the catch) sponsored a special bobblehead doll day to commemorate the catch. The left field entrance gate of the Mets' current ballpark, Citi Field, features a metal silhouette of a baseball player making a leaping catch similar to the one Chávez made during the 2006 NLCS.

Chávez's playing time decreased dramatically in 2007 when he only saw time in 71 games, primarily splitting time with regular left fielder Moisés Alou, due to left hamstring issues which landed him on the disabled list twice. That winter, he reinjured his hamstring and injured his right ankle while playing winter ball in Venezuela for Navegantes del Magallanes.

In 2008, Chávez again saw time as the Mets' fourth outfielder and hit .267 in 270 at-bats. On September 28, the final day of the 2008 regular season and the final game at Shea Stadium, the Mets played the Florida Marlins. With an NL wildcard spot at stake for the Mets, Chávez made another terrific catch in the outfield during the top of the seventh inning. After a ball was hit to left field by Jorge Cantú, Chávez made the catch for the final out of the inning. Despite his defensive play, the Mets lost to the Marlins 4-2 and failed to qualify for post-season play.

=== Seattle Mariners ===
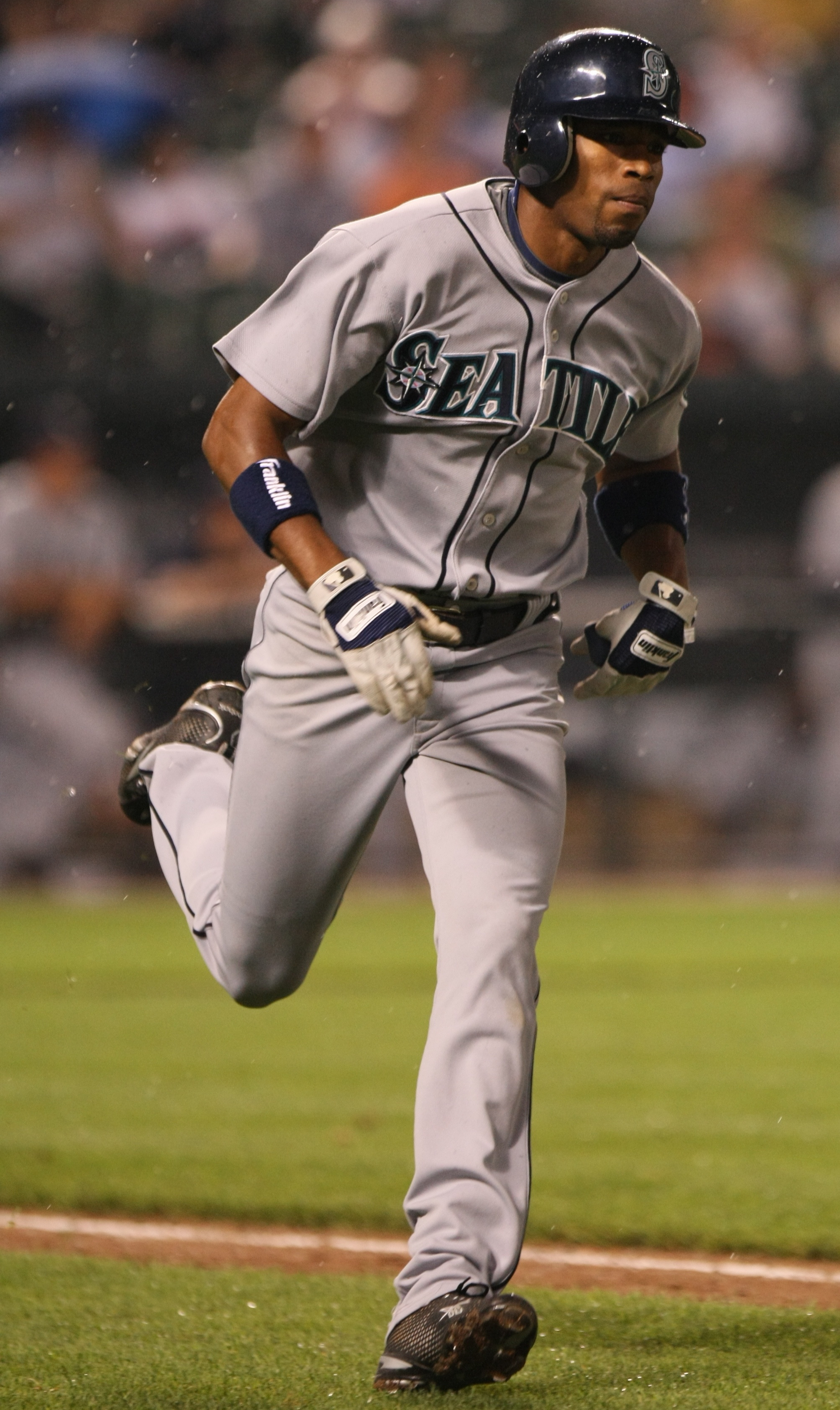
Chávez with the Mariners in 2009

On December 11, Chávez was involved in a three-team, 12-player trade in which he was sent, along with pitcher Aaron Heilman and several minor leaguers, to the Seattle Mariners.

On June 19, 2009, while trying to catch a pop-up, Chávez collided with shortstop Yuniesky Betancourt and suffered a torn ACL in his right knee which ended his 2009 season.

=== Texas Rangers ===
On February 15, 2010, Chávez agreed to a minor league free agent contract with the Texas Rangers and spent time with the Rangers' Rookie League team, the AA Frisco and AAA Oklahoma City while coming back from his ACL injury. In 2011, he batted .301 with 5 home runs in 256 at-bats and helped the Rangers to the 2011 World Series, which they lost to the St. Louis Cardinals in seven games.

=== Baltimore Orioles ===
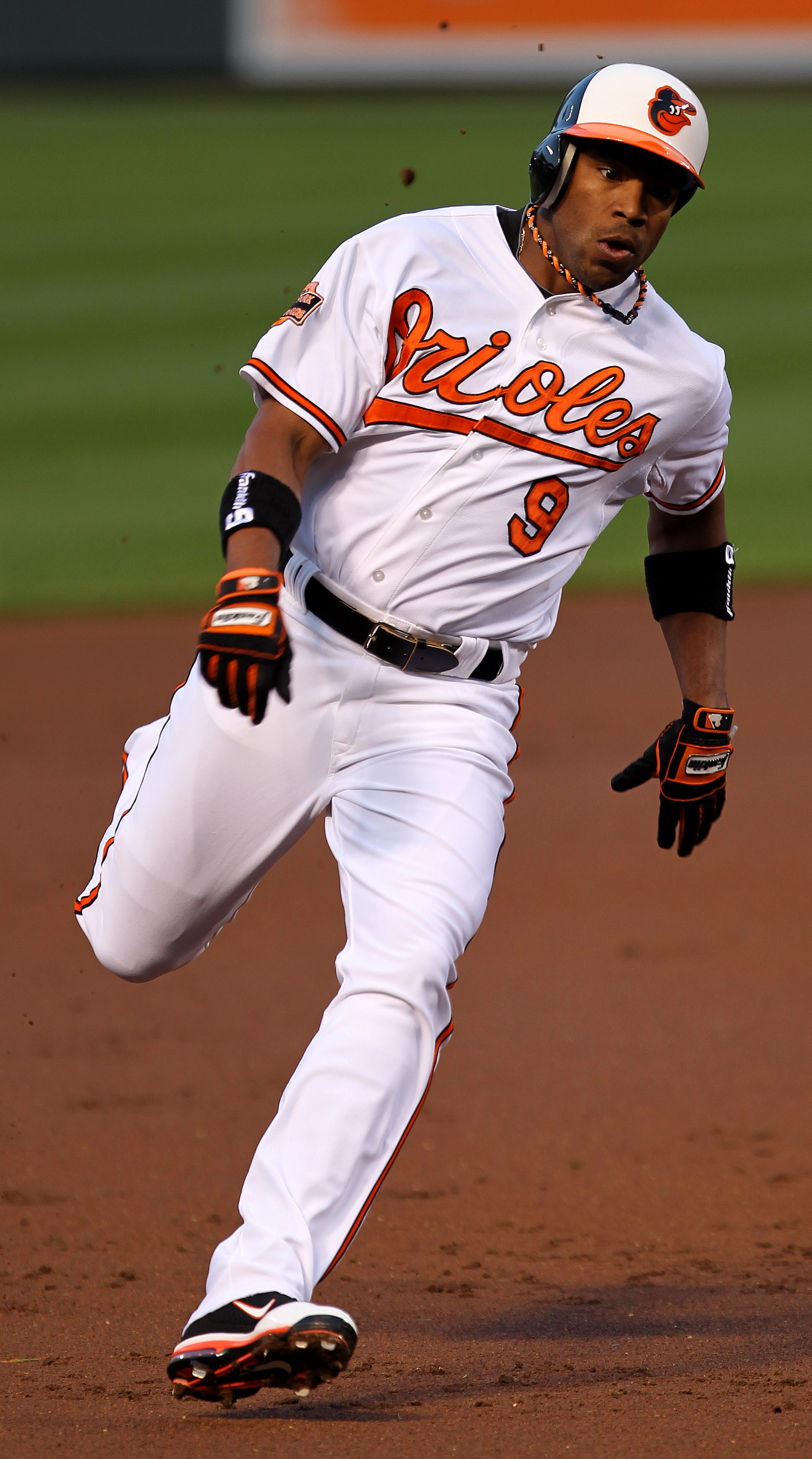
Chávez with the Baltimore Orioles

On December 18, 2011, Chávez signed a one-year, $1.5 million contract with the Baltimore Orioles. Chávez again saw major time on the disabled list (suffering intercostal muscle hamstring injuries) appeared in only 64 games, batting .203 with 12 RBIs and two home runs. On August 4, he was designated for assignment to make room for Nate McLouth and spent the next month with AAA Norfolk. He was recalled by the Orioles in mid-September.

=== Seattle Mariners ===
On December 31, 2012 Chávez signed a minor league contract with the Kansas City Royals, but was released on March 22, 2013. On March 24, Chávez signed a minor league contract with the Seattle Mariners and appeared in 97 games for the Mariners hitting .267.

=== Bridgeport Bluefish ===
On March 8, 2016, Chávez signed with the Bridgeport Bluefish, in the Atlantic League. Chávez was very successful in his first season with the Bluefish, batting .345 and winning the league batting title. In 95 games he hit .345/.397/.415 with 2 home runs, 37 RBIs and 5 stolen bases.

=== Pericos de Puebla ===
On March 9, 2017, Chávez signed with the Pericos de Puebla of the Mexican Baseball League. In 93 games he hit .343/.397/.429 with 5 home runs, 59 RBIs and 1 stolen base. He was released before the start of the 2018 season on January 23, 2018.

=== Somerset Patriots ===
On February 26, 2018, Chávez signed with the Somerset Patriots of the Atlantic League of Professional Baseball. He retired as an active player following the conclusion of the season. In 87 games he hit .287/.317/.330 with 2 home runs, 41 RBIs and 1 stolen base.

=== Venezuelan Professional Baseball League ===
Chávez played for 19 seasons in the Venezuelan Professional Baseball League, all of them with Navegantes del Magallanes.

== Post-playing career ==
=== New York Mets ===
In February 2019, Chávez returned to the Mets organization and was announced as a new coach for the Brooklyn Cyclones, the team's Low–A affiliate. For the 2020 season, he was named the bench coach of the High–A St. Lucie Mets. Following the 2022 season, the Mets announced that they would not be bringing Chávez back as a minor league coach.

Chavez served as the first base coach for the Tiburones de La Guiara of the Venezuelan league, from the start of the 2023-24 winter ball season, through the 2024 Caribbean Series.

=== Tecolotes de los Dos Laredos ===
On January 8, 2024, Chávez was hired to serve as the hitting coach for the Tecolotes de los Dos Laredos of the Mexican League. He was fired by the club on May 17.

== Personal life ==
Chávez had a daughter, Joendys, with Joelis Molina on August 5, 2009 in Seattle. In the years following her birth, Chávez and Molina engaged in an international custody battle in the courts of Venezuela and the United States, ultimately concluding when judge Jose L. Linares of the United States District Court for the District of New Jersey ordered that Joendys be returned to her mother in Venezuela pursuant to the Hague Convention on the Civil Aspects of International Child Abduction.

Chávez married his wife, Patrice, on September 15, 2015, in Emerson, New Jersey where the couple was then residing. Chávez is the older brother of Ender Chávez.

== See also ==
- List of Major League Baseball players from Venezuela
