= Carlos Pascual (baseball) =

Cuban baseball player (1931–2011)

- Pitcher
- Born: March 13, 1931; Havana, Cuba
- Died: 12 May 2011 (aged 80); Miami, Florida, U.S.
- Batted: Right Threw: Right

MLB debut
- September 24, 1950, for the Washington Senators

Last MLB appearance
- September 28, 1950, for the Washington Senators

MLB statistics
- Win–loss record: 1-1
- Strikeouts: 3
- Earned run average: 2.12
- Stats at Baseball Reference

Teams
- Washington Senators (1950)

Carlos Alberto Pascual Lus (13 March 1931 – 12 May 2011) was a Cuban-born Major League Baseball pitcher. The 5 ft 6 in (1.68 m), 165 lb (75 kg) right-hander was signed by the Washington Senators as an amateur free agent before the 1949 season, and he played for the Senators in 1950. Nicknamed "Big Potato" (a corruption of the Spanish slang "patato", meaning short; Pascual was listed at 5'6"), he was the older brother of All-Star pitcher Camilo Pascual.

He began his professional career with the Big Spring Broncs of the Longhorn League, where he spent a season and a half. He then played for three seasons for the Havana Cubans of Florida International League and was promoted to the Washington major league squad while a member of that club.

Pascual started two games for Washington towards the end of the 1950 season. At 19 years of age, he was the third-youngest player to appear in an American League game in 1950. He won his first start (September 24), defeating the Philadelphia Athletics at Griffith Stadium, 3–1. He lost his second start (September 28), by a score of 4–3 to the Boston Red Sox at Fenway Park. His two-game career totals were 2 complete games, 17 innings pitched, 12 hits allowed, 3 strikeouts, 8 bases on balls, a 1–1 record, and a 2.12 ERA.

Pascual spent the rest of his 14-year career in the minor leagues where he also saw time at both shortstop and third base in addition to starting and relieving. Pascual finished his minor league career with a .323 batting average and 198 home runs and 40–32 pitching record with a 3.09 ERA in 161 games.

After his playing career ended, Pascual scouted for the Yankees, Baltimore Orioles and Mets, most notably signing Dwight "Doc" Gooden for the Mets.

He died in Miami, Florida at the age of 80.
