= Tim Tolman =

American baseball player and coach (1956–2021)

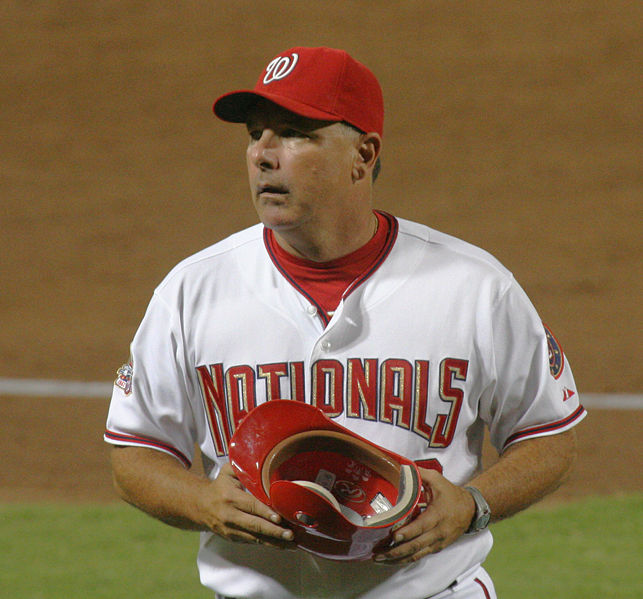
- Outfielder / Bench coach
- Born: April 20, 1956; Santa Monica, California, U.S.
- Died: June 3, 2021 (aged 65); Tucson, Arizona, U.S.
- Batted: Right Threw: Right

MLB debut
- September 9, 1981, for the Houston Astros

Last MLB appearance
- August 16, 1987, for the Detroit Tigers

MLB statistics
- Batting average: .168
- Hits: 33
- Runs batted in: 24
- Stats at Baseball Reference

Teams
- As player: Houston Astros (1981–1985); Detroit Tigers (1986–1987); As coach: Washington Nationals (2007–2008); Cleveland Indians (2010–2011)

Timothy Lee Tolman (April 20, 1956 – June 3, 2021) was an American professional baseball outfielder and coach. He played in Major League Baseball (MLB) for the Houston Astros and Detroit Tigers from 1981 to 1987.

== Playing career ==
Tolman played his college baseball at the University of Southern California and was drafted by the Houston Astros in the 12th round of the 1978 amateur draft. He reached the major leagues in 1981 after batting .322, hitting 14 home runs and having 99 runs batted in for the Tucson Toros of the Pacific Coast League. His OPS was .927.

In his seven major league seasons (with the Astros from 1981 through 1985, and the Detroit Tigers in 1986–1987), Tolman could never gain a regular job and hit only .168 for his career, never batting higher than the .196 he posted in 1983. Defensively, Tolman posted a perfect 1.000 fielding percentage in his major league career (135 putouts, 5 assists). He played two more seasons in the International League (for the Tidewater Tides in 1988 and the Syracuse Chiefs in 1989) before retiring.

== Coaching career ==
After his playing career, Tolman managed from 1991–1996 in the Astros' minor-league system. He was a scout in 1997–1999 and a scouting supervisor for the Astros in 2000–2002, then became minor league field coordinator for the Cleveland Indians from 2003 to 2006.

Tolman was the third base coach for the Washington Nationals in 2008 and was the subject of criticism. Tolman was fired on September 28, 2008, after the final game of the 2008 season.

On January 13, 2009, Tolman was named the Seattle Mariners coordinator of instruction.

After the 2009 season, Tolman was hired as bench coach by new Cleveland Indians' new manager, Manny Acta, under whom Tolman had coached in Washington. The relationship between Tolman and Acta goes back to 1991, when Acta played for Tolman, who was managing the Burlington Astros of the Midwest League. Acta later served on Tolman's coaching staff.

"He's a very bright baseball mind. I feel very comfortable with Tim," Acta said. "He managed me in the minor leagues. I feel like he's a guy that can really help me. He's never been afraid to talk to me, and that is very important for a bench coach. He's also very familiar with our system, which we took into consideration."

Tolman retired from coaching following the 2011 season after being diagnosed with Parkinson's disease. During the final game of the season, Acta was ejected by home plate umpire Dan Bellino in the first inning after arguing balls and strikes, which resulted in bench coach Tolman managing the Indians for the rest of the game in his final game as a major league coach. Speculation was raised that Acta intentionally got himself ejected so Tolman could have the honor of managing the rest of the game, which Acta denied.

== Personal life ==
On June 3, 2021, Tolman died following a ten–year battle with Parkinson's disease.
