= 2013 Caribbean Series =

2013 baseball tournament

The fifty-fifth edition of the Caribbean Series (Serie del Caribe) was played in 2013.

The Series was held from February 1 through February 7, featuring the champion teams of the 2012–2013 season in the Dominican Winter League (Leones del Escogido), Mexican Pacific League (Yaquis de Obregón), Puerto Rican Professional Baseball League (Criollos de Caguas), and Venezuelan Professional Baseball League (Navegantes del Magallanes).

The format consisted of twelve games, in a double round-robin format with each team facing each other twice, while the championship game was played between the two best teams of the round robin. All of the games were played at Estadio Sonora in Hermosillo, Mexico.

== Final standings ==
Country	Club	W	L	W/L %	Managers
Dominican Republic	Leones del Escogido	5	2	.833	Audo Vicente
Mexico (*)	Yaquis de Obregón	3	3	.500	Eddie Díaz
Puerto Rico	Criollos de Caguas	2	4	.333	Pedro López
Venezuela	Navegantes del Magallanes	2	4	.333	Luis Sojo
* Won the championship game

== Individual leaders ==
Player	Statistic
Batting
Doug Clark (MEX)	Batting average	.412
Jordany Valdespin (DOM)	Runs	7
Doug Clark (MEX)	Hits	11
Marlon Byrd (MEX)	Doubles	4
Alfredo Amézaga (MEX); Renny Osuna (VEN)	Triples	1
Mario Lisson (VEN); Francisco Peña (DOM); Miguel Tejada (DOM)	Home runs	2
Ricardo Nanita (DOM)	RBI	7
Hanley Ramírez (DOM)	Stolen bases	4
Pitching
Luis Mendoza (MEX)	Wins	2
Angel Castro (DOM)	Strikeouts	14
Luis Mendoza (MEX)	ERA	0.00
Angel Castro (DOM)	Innings pitched	14 2/3
Saúl Rivera (DOM)	Saves	2

== All-Star team ==
Name	Position
Francisco Peña (DOM)	Catcher
Donell Linares (DOM)	First baseman
José Ramírez (DOM)	Second baseman
Mario Lisson (VEN)	Third baseman
Miguel Tejada (DOM)	Shortstop
Marlon Byrd (MEX)	Outfielder
Doug Clark (MEX)	Outfielder
Ricardo Nanita (DOM)	Outfielder
Bárbaro Cañizares (MEX)	Designated hitter
Luis Mendoza (MEX)	Right-handed starting pitcher
Efraim Nieves (PUR)	Left-handed starting pitcher
David Reyes (MEX)	Relief pitcher
Saúl Rivera (VEN)	Closer
Awards
Luis Mendoza (MEX)	Most Valuable Player
Audo Vicente (DOM)	Manager

== Scoreboards ==
=== Game 1, February 1 ===
Team	1	2	3	4	5	6	7	8	9	R	H	E
Venezuela	1	0	0	1	0	0	0	0	0	2	3	1
Dominican Republic	0	0	0	1	4	0	2	0	X	7	7	0
WP: Ángel Castro (1-0) LP: Sergio Perez (0-1); Home runs: VEN: Reegie Corona (1); DOM: Francisco Peña (1); Boxscore

=== Game 2, February 1 ===
Team	1	2	3	4	5	6	7	8	9	R	H	E
Puerto Rico	0	0	0	0	0	0	0	0	0	0	5	1
Mexico	0	0	1	0	0	2	0	0	X	3	6	0
WP: Luis Mendoza (1-0) LP: Kelvin Villa (0-1) Sv: Luis Ayala (1); Boxscore

=== Game 3, February 2 ===
Team	1	2	3	4	5	6	7	8	9	R	H	E
Dominican Republic	0	0	0	0	1	1	1	3	0	6	8	0
Puerto Rico	0	0	0	0	2	0	0	0	0	2	5	2
WP: Jailen Peguero (1-0) LP: José De La Torre (0-1); Home runs: DOM: Donell Linares (1); PUR: None; Boxscore

=== Game 4, February 2 ===
Team	1	2	3	4	5	6	7	8	9	R	H	E
Mexico	0	0	0	1	0	0	2	0	0	3	9	0
Venezuela	0	0	1	0	0	0	0	2	1	4	6	1
WP: Gabriel García (1-0) LP: Mike Benacka (0-1); Home runs: MEX: None; VEN: Robert Pérez (1), Mario Lisson (1); Boxscore

=== Game 5, February 3 ===
Team	1	2	3	4	5	6	7	8	9	R	H	E
Venezuela	0	1	0	0	0	2	0	0	0	3	5	0
Puerto Rico	0	0	0	1	0	0	0	0	0	1	9	0
WP: Ken Ray (1-0) LP: Zach Segovia (0-1) Sv: Víctor Moreno (1); Home runs: VEN: José Castillo (1), José Yépez (1); PUR: None; Boxscore

=== Game 6, February 3 ===
Team	1	2	3	4	5	6	7	8	9	10	11	R	H	E
Mexico	0	0	1	2	1	0	0	0	1	0	0	5	12	1
Dominican Republic	0	2	0	0	3	0	0	0	0	0	1	6	12	0
WP: Nelson Payano (1-0) LP: Luis Ayala (0-1); Home runs: MEX: None; DOM: Miguel Tejada (1); Boxscore

=== Game 7, February 4 ===
Team	1	2	3	4	5	6	7	8	9	10	R	H	E
Puerto Rico	0	2	0	0	0	0	0	2	0	2	6	13	2
Dominican Republic	0	0	2	0	0	1	1	0	0	0	4	8	1
WP: Sergio Espinosa (1-0) LP: Jailen Peguero (1-1) Sv: Saúl Rivera (1); Home runs: PUR: Rey Navarro; DOM: Jordany Valdespin (1), Alberto Rosario (1); Boxscore

=== Game 8, February 4 ===
Team	1	2	3	4	5	6	7	8	9	R	H	E
Venezuela	0	0	0	0	0	0	0	0	0	0	7	1
Mexico	2	0	0	0	0	0	0	0	0	2	3	0
WP: Rolando Valdez (1-0) LP: Austin Bibens-Dirkx (0-1) Sv: Óscar Villarreal (1); Home runs: VEN: None; MEX: Alfredo Amézaga (1); Boxscore

=== Game 9, February 5 ===
Team	1	2	3	4	5	6	7	8	9	R	H	E
Puerto Rico	0	0	0	1	1	0	0	1	1	4	9	0
Venezuela	0	1	0	0	0	0	0	0	0	1	5	0
WP: Efrain Nieves (1-0) LP: Yeiper Castillo (0-1) Sv: Saúl Rivera (2); Home runs: PUR: Ramón Castro (1); VEN: Mario Lisson (2); Boxscore

=== Game 10, February 5 ===
Team	1	2	3	4	5	6	7	8	9	R	H	E
Dominican Republic	1	0	3	0	0	0	0	7	0	11	12	4
Mexico	1	0	3	2	0	0	0	0	0	6	8	0
WP: Willy Lebron (1-0) LP: José Cobos (0-1); Home runs: DOM: José Ramírez (1), Miguel Tejada (2) * MEX: Chris Roberson (1); Boxscore

* Tejada extended an all-time home run record (15) in the Series he already held.

=== Game 11, February 6 ===
Team	1	2	3	4	5	6	7	8	9	R	H	E
Dominican Republic	0	0	0	1	0	0	1	0	2	4	9	2
Venezuela	0	0	1	0	1	0	0	0	0	2	5	1
WP: Armando Rodríguez (1-0) LP: Víctor Moreno (0-1); Home runs: DOM: Julio Lugo (1), Francisco Peña (2); VEN: None; Boxscore

=== Game 12, February 6 ===
Team	1	2	3	4	5	6	7	8	9	R	H	E
Mexico	0	3	0	0	0	5	0	0	2	10	9	0
Puerto Rico	0	0	0	0	0	0	0	0	0	0	3	2
WP: Luis Mendoza (2-0) LP: Kelvin Villa (0-2); Home runs: MEX: Bárbaro Cañizares (1); PUR: None; Boxscore

=== Championship Game, February 7 ===
Team	1	2	3	4	5	6	7	8	9	10	11	12	13	14	15	16	17	18	R	H	E
Mexico	0	0	0	0	2	0	0	0	0	0	0	0	0	1	0	0	0	1	4	6	2
Dominican Republic	0	0	1	0	0	0	0	0	1	0	0	0	0	1	0	0	0	0	3	16	1
WP: Marco Carrillo (1-0) LP: Edward Valdez (0-1); Home runs: MEX: Karim García (1), Doug Clark (1); DOM: Ricardo Nanita (1); Boxscore
