= 2013 in baseball =

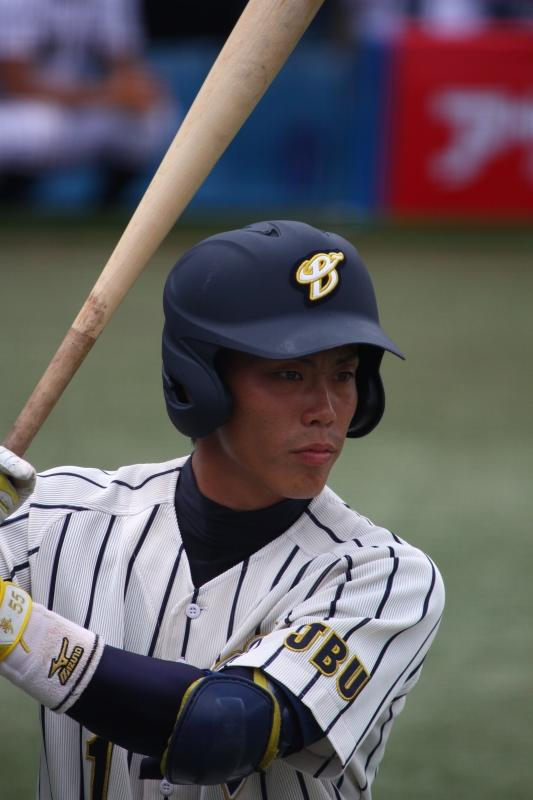
Ryo Miki in 2013

The following are the baseball events of the year 2013 throughout the world. They include Major League Baseball, Minor League Baseball and major events in baseball.

== Champions ==
=== Major League Baseball ===
- Regular Season Champions

League	Eastern Division Champions	Central Division Champions	Western Division Champions	Wild Card Qualifier 1	Wild Card Qualifier 2
American League	Boston Red Sox	Detroit Tigers	Oakland Athletics	Cleveland Indians	Tampa Bay Rays
National League	Atlanta Braves	St. Louis Cardinals	Los Angeles Dodgers	Pittsburgh Pirates	Cincinnati Reds

- Postseason

Wild Card Game (ALWC, NLWC)
4	Cleveland	0
5	Tampa Bay	1
4	Pittsburgh	1
5	Cincinnati	0

Division Series (ALDS, NLDS)
1	Boston	3
5	Tampa Bay	1
American League
2	Oakland	2
3	Detroit	3
1	St. Louis	3
4	Pittsburgh	2
National League
2	Atlanta	1
3	LA Dodgers	3

League Championship Series (ALCS, NLCS)
1	Boston	4
3	Detroit	2
1	St. Louis	4
3	LA Dodgers	2

World Series
AL1	Boston	4
NL1	St. Louis	2

=== Other Champions ===
- Minor League Baseball
  - AAA
    - Championship: Omaha Storm Chasers (Kansas City Royals)
      - International League: Durham Bulls (Tampa Bay Rays)
      - Pacific Coast League: Omaha Storm Chasers (Kansas City Royals)
    - Mexican League: Tigres de Quintana Roo
  - AA
    - Eastern League: Trenton Thunder (New York Yankees)
    - Southern League: Birmingham Barons (Chicago White Sox)
    - Texas League: San Antonio Missions (San Diego Padres)
  - A
    - California League: Inland Empire 66ers of San Bernardino (Los Angeles Angels of Anaheim)
    - Carolina League: Salem Red Sox (Boston Red Sox)
    - Florida State League: Daytona Cubs (Chicago Cubs)
    - Midwest League: Quad Cities River Bandits (Houston Astros)
    - South Atlantic League: Savannah Sand Gnats (New York Mets)
  - Short Season A
    - New York–Penn League: Tri-City ValleyCats (Houston Astros)
    - Northwest League: Vancouver Canadians (Toronto Blue Jays)
  - Rookie
    - Appalachian League: Pulaski Mariners (Seattle Mariners)
    - Arizona League: AZL Giants (San Francisco Giants)
    - Gulf Coast League: GCL Nationals (Washington Nationals)
    - Pioneer League: Idaho Falls Chukars (Kansas City Royals)
    - Dominican Summer League: DSL Rangers (Texas Rangers)
    - Venezuelan Summer League: VSL Mariners (Seattle Mariners)
  - Arizona Fall League: Surprise Saguaros
- Independent baseball leagues
  - American Association: Gary SouthShore RailCats
  - Atlantic League: Long Island Ducks
  - CanAm League: Québec Capitales
  - Freedom Pro League: Phoenix Prospectors
  - Frontier League: Schaumburg Boomers
  - Pacific Association: Maui Warriors
  - Pecos League: Roswell Invaders
  - United League Baseball: Edinburg Roadrunners
- Amateur
  - College
    - College World Series: UCLA
    - NCAA Division II: Tampa
    - NCAA Division III: Linfield
    - NAIA: Faulkner
  - Youth
    - Big League World Series: Taiwan
    - Junior League World Series: Hsin Ming LL (Taoyuan, Taiwan)
    - Intermediate League World Series: Nogales National LL (Nogales, Arizona)
    - Little League World Series: Seoul Little League (Seoul, South Korea)
    - Senior League World Series: West University LL (Houston, Texas)
- International
  - National teams
    - World Baseball Classic: Dominican Republic
    - World Port Tournament: Cuba
  - International club team competitions
    - Caribbean Series: Yaquis de Obregón (Mexico)
    - European Champions Cup: Bologna (Italy)
    - Asia Series: Canberra Cavalry (Australia)
  - Domestic leagues
    - Australian Baseball League: Canberra Cavalry
    - Cuban National Series: Villa Clara
    - Dominican League: Leones del Escogido
    - France – Division Élite: Rouen Huskies
    - Holland Series: Neptunus
    - Italian Baseball League: San Marino
    - Japan Series: Tohoku Rakuten Golden Eagles
      - Pacific League: Tohoku Rakuten Golden Eagles
      - Central League: Yomiuri Giants
    - Korea Series: Samsung Lions
    - Mexican League: Yaquis de Obregón
    - Puerto Rican League: Criollos de Caguas
    - Taiwan Series: Uni-President 7-Eleven Lions
    - Venezuelan League: Navegantes del Magallanes

== Awards and honors ==
- Woman Executive of the Year (major or minor league): Joan McGrath, Arizona Fall League

=== Major League Baseball ===
BBWAA awards

- Baseball Hall of Fame honors
  - For the first time since 1996 (and just the third time since 1960), the BBWAA election resulted in no selections. Three individuals were elected and subsequently inducted in voting by the Pre-Integration Era panel of the Veterans Committee:
    - Hank O'Day
    - Jacob Ruppert
    - Deacon White
  - Paul Hagen received the J. G. Taylor Spink Award for excellence in writing.
  - Tom Cheek received the Ford C. Frick Award for excellence in broadcasting.
- MVP Award
  - American League – Miguel Cabrera (DET)
  - National League – Andrew McCutchen (PIT)
- Cy Young Award
  - American League – Max Scherzer (DET)
  - National League – Clayton Kershaw (LAD)
- Rookie of the Year
  - American League – Wil Myers (TB)
  - National League – José Fernández (MIA)
- Manager of the Year Award
  - American League – Terry Francona (CLE)
  - National League – Clint Hurdle (PIT)

Major League Baseball awards

- World Series MVP: David Ortiz (BOS)
- League Championship Series MVP: Koji Uehara (BOS); Michael Wacha (STL)
- All-Star Game MVP: Mariano Rivera (NYY)
- Branch Rickey Award: Clayton Kershaw (LAD)
- Hank Aaron Award: Miguel Cabrera (DET); Paul Goldschmidt (AZ)
- Roberto Clemente Award: Carlos Beltrán (STL)

Sporting News Awards

- Player of the Year: Miguel Cabrera (DET)
- Pitcher of the Year: Max Scherzer (DET)
- Rookie of the Year: Wil Myers (TB); José Fernández (MIA)
- Comeback Player of the Year: Mariano Rivera (NYY); Francisco Liriano (PIT)
- Manager of the Year: John Farrell (BOS); Clint Hurdle (PIT)
- Executive of the Year: Ben Cherington (BOS)

Players Choice Awards

- Player of the Year: Miguel Cabrera (DET)
- Marvin Miller Man of the Year: Mariano Rivera (NYY)
- Outstanding Players: Miguel Cabrera (DET); Andrew McCutchen (PIT)
- Outstanding Pitchers: Max Scherzer (DET); Clayton Kershaw (LAD)
- Outstanding Rookies: Wil Myers (TB); José Fernández (MIA)
- Comeback Players of the Year: Mariano Rivera (NYY); Francisco Liriano (PIT)

Other awards

- Luis Aparicio Award: Miguel Cabrera (DET)
- Warren Spahn Award: Clayton Kershaw (LAD)

Silver Slugger Awards

American League			National League
Player	Team	Position	Player	Team
Chris Davis	Baltimore Orioles	First baseman	Paul Goldschmidt	Arizona Diamondbacks
Robinson Canó	New York Yankees	Second baseman	Matt Carpenter	St. Louis Cardinals
Miguel Cabrera	Detroit Tigers	Third baseman	Pedro Alvarez	Pittsburgh Pirates
J. J. Hardy	Baltimore Orioles	Shortstop	Ian Desmond	Washington Nationals
Mike Trout	Los Angeles Angels	Outfielder	Andrew McCutchen	Pittsburgh Pirates
Torii Hunter	Detroit Tigers	Outfielder	Michael Cuddyer	Colorado Rockies
Adam Jones	Baltimore Orioles	Outfielder	Jay Bruce	Cincinnati Reds
Joe Mauer	Minnesota Twins	Catcher	Yadier Molina	St. Louis Cardinals
David Ortiz	Boston Red Sox	Designated hitter / Pitcher	Zack Greinke	Los Angeles Dodgers

Gold Glove Awards

American League			National League
Player	Team	Position	Player	Team
Eric Hosmer	Kansas City Royals	First baseman	Paul Goldschmidt	Arizona Diamondbacks
Dustin Pedroia	Boston Red Sox	Second baseman	Brandon Phillips	Cincinnati Reds
Manny Machado	Baltimore Orioles	Third baseman	Nolan Arenado	Colorado Rockies
J. J. Hardy	Baltimore Orioles	Shortstop	Andrelton Simmons	Atlanta Braves
Alex Gordon	Kansas City Royals	Left fielder	Carlos González	Colorado Rockies
Adam Jones	Baltimore Orioles	Center fielder	Carlos Gómez	Milwaukee Brewers
Shane Victorino	Boston Red Sox	Right fielder	Gerardo Parra	Arizona Diamondbacks
Salvador Pérez	Kansas City Royals	Catcher	Yadier Molina	St. Louis Cardinals
R. A. Dickey	Toronto Blue Jays	Pitcher	Adam Wainwright	St. Louis Cardinals

=== Minor League Baseball ===
- Baseball America Minor League Player of the Year Award: Byron Buxton (Minnesota Twins)
- Dernell Stenson Sportsmanship Award: Garin Cecchini (Boston Red Sox)
- International League MVP: Chris Colabello (Minnesota Twins)
- Larry Doby Award: Matt Davidson (Arizona Diamondbacks)
- Pacific Coast League MVP: Chris Owings (Arizona Diamondbacks)
- USA Today Minor League Player of the Year Award: Xander Bogaerts (Boston Red Sox)

== Regular season events ==
=== January ===
- January 9 – For the first time since 1996, the Baseball Writers' Association of America fails to select a player for induction into the Hall of Fame. Craig Biggio, in his first year on the ballot, leads all players with 68.2 percent of the vote and falls 39 votes short of induction. Jack Morris is next with 67.7 percent, followed by Jeff Bagwell (59.6), Mike Piazza (57.8 in his first year on the ballot) and Tim Raines (52.2). Roger Clemens, Barry Bonds and Sammy Sosa, all in their first year on the ballot, receive 37.6, 36.2 and 12.5 percent of the votes respectively.

=== February ===
- February 7 – At Winter Baseball, Doug Clark hits a solo home run in the top of the 18th inning to lead Mexico's Yaquis de Obregón in beating Dominican Republic's Leones del Escogido, 4–3, to clinch the 2013 Caribbean Series final. The game lasts seven hours and 28 minutes, making it the longest game in Caribbean Series (55-year) history. The previous record of six hours, 13 minutes was set in the 2007 Opening Game, when Tony Batista of the Dominican Republic hit a bases-loaded sacrifice fly in the 18th inning to give his team a 4–3 victory over Venezuela. Mexico's pitcher Luis Mendoza is named the Most Valuable Player of the event.
- February 18 – For the first time since salary arbitration began in 1974, none of the MLB players who file wind up arguing their cases. After peaking at 35 hearings in 1986, the number of salary arbitration cases argued had not reached double digits since 2001. The total of cases dropped to a record low of three in 2005, 2009 and 2011, and there were none at all in 2013. All 133 players who filed in January settled, gaining an average increase of 119 per cent, according to a study by The Associated Press.

=== March ===
- March 5 – Major League Baseball intends to expand the use of instant replay for the 2014 season and will be studying over the course of this year which calls to review and how to do it. League officials plan to visit Miami during the World Baseball Classic and various spring training sites to examine camera angles and other factors that will help them develop a plan.
- March 19 – At AT&T Park, the Dominican Republic blanks Puerto Rico, 3–0, to complete the most dominant championship run in the brief history of the World Baseball Classic. The Dominican team, managed by Tony Peña, caps an 8–0 unbeaten run to become the first undefeated champion team in the tournament. New York Yankees second baseman Robinson Canó earns MVP honors, after batting an average of .469 (15-for-32) with two home runs and six RBI, while Tampa Bay Rays closer Fernando Rodney finishes for his seventh save to extend his own Classic record. The losing team would congratulate the winner on the field, a sportsmanlike and uncommon gesture in MLB playoff games.
- March 31 – In their American League debut, the Houston Astros defeat the Texas Rangers, 8–2, at Minute Maid Park. The victory is the 4,000th in the franchise's history, the first 51 years of which were played in the National League, the first three (1962–1964) as the Houston Colt .45's.

=== April ===
- April 1 – At Dodger Stadium, Clayton Kershaw of the Los Angeles Dodgers shuts out the San Francisco Giants 4–0 on four hits and helps his own cause by homering in the same game. The home run, the first of Kershaw's career, comes in the eighth inning off relief pitcher George Kontos and breaks a scoreless tie. Kershaw, who had been locked in a pitcher's duel with Matt Cain for six innings, becomes only the second pitcher since 1921 to throw an Opening Day shutout and hit a home run in the same game, Bob Lemon having accomplished the feat in 1953.
- April 2 – In defeating the Houston Astros 7–0 at Minute Maid Park, Yu Darvish of the Texas Rangers has a perfect game broken up with two out in the ninth, a Marwin González ground ball going through Darvish's legs for a single. Darvish, who is pulled after the base hit, records 14 strikeouts, which would have tied him with Sandy Koufax and Matt Cain for most strikeouts by a perfect game pitcher. The Rangers' last no-hitter had also been a perfect game, by Kenny Rogers in 1994. The Astros, victims of Matt Cain's perfect game in 2012, avoid joining the Tampa Bay Rays in 2009 and 2010 as the only teams to have perfect games thrown against them in consecutive seasons.
- April 7 – Justin Masterson of the Cleveland Indians defeats David Price and the Tampa Bay Rays, 13–0. Coupled with his season-opening win over R. A. Dickey, Masterson becomes the third pitcher in MLB history to register victories over two reigning Cy Young Award winners in one season and the first to do so in consecutive starts. The San Diego Padres' Bruce Hurst defeated both Orel Hershiser and Frank Viola in 1989, while the Atlanta Braves' Shane Reynolds beat both Barry Zito and Randy Johnson in 2003.
- April 14:
  - The Chicago Cubs tie a major league record with five wild pitches in a single inning and become the first team to do so in a regular season game. Edwin Jackson and Michael Bowden combine to throw five wild pitches in the sixth inning of the game against the San Francisco Giants at Wrigley Field, equalling a feat performed by Rick Ankiel of the St. Louis Cardinals in the 2000 National League Division Series. The Giants go on to win the game 10–7 in 10 innings.
  - The International Baseball Federation, as part of the attempt to reinstate baseball and softball to the Olympic program in 2020, announces that it will merge with softball's governing body, the International Softball Federation, to create a new body that will govern both sports. The new body will be known as the World Baseball Softball Confederation.
- April 23 – In the second game of a doubleheader at Coors Field, B. J. and Justin Upton of the Atlanta Braves become only the second brothers to hit back-to-back home runs in the same game. B. J. begins the fifth inning by homering off Jon Garland, his third of the season. Next up, Justin follows with his league-leading 11th home run. The Braves defeat the Colorado Rockies 10–2. Lloyd and Paul Waner had been the only brothers to hit back-to-back home runs, doing so for the Pittsburgh Pirates on September 15, 1938.
- April 26 – At Comerica Park, Aníbal Sánchez of the Detroit Tigers breaks Mickey Lolich's 44-year franchise record for most strikeouts in one game, striking out 17 Atlanta Braves in eight innings in the Tigers' 10–0 victory. Sánchez sets the mark by recording a three-strikeout eighth inning, after which he is pulled. Lolich had held the previous franchise record of 16 strikeouts, doing so twice in 1969.

=== May ===
- May 2:
  - Major League Baseball announces that Atlanta Braves outfielder Justin Upton and Baltimore Orioles outfielder Chris Davis are named players of the month for April in the National League and American League, respectively. In his first season in Atlanta, Upton batted a .299 average with 12 home runs and 19 RBI while leading the Braves to a 17–9 April record. Davis is in his third season with the Orioles, but has finally tapped into his potential. Through the first month of the season, he hit .348 with nine home runs and 28 RBI while posting an OPS of 1.141.
  - Clay Buchholz of the Boston Red Sox is named the American League Pitcher of the Month. In his five starts, Buchholz registered a perfect 5–0 record with a 1.19 ERA, 39 strikeouts and 13 walks over 37 2/3 innings of work, to help the Red Sox match a club record with 18 wins in April, a month mark also achieved in 1998 and 2003. This is Buchholz's second 'pitcher of the month' award. He previously won the honor in August 2010. Meanwhile, his counterpart Matt Harvey of the New York Mets is voted the Pitcher of the Month in the National League. Harvey went 4–0 in six starts, while his 1.56 ERA ranked third and his 46 strikeouts tied for fourth in the league. Harvey also becomes the first pitcher in the modern era to win his first four starts while allowing 10-or-fewer hits in that span.
  - Justin Grimm of the Texas Rangers is named the American League Rookie of the Month for April. Grimm posted a 2–0 record and a 1.59 ERA, striking out 15 batters while walking four in 17.0 innings over three starts. Grimm was tied for first among AL rookie pitchers in wins, finishing fourth overall in innings pitched, and limiting his opponents to a .239 average. In the National League, Atlanta Braves catcher Evan Gattis earns Rookie of the Month honors for the month of April. In 21 games, Gattis led all major league rookies with six home runs, 16 RBI, a .566 slugging percentage and 43 total bases, while hitting .250 (19-for-76). The 26-year-old, who was selected by the Braves in the 23rd round of the 2010 First-Year Player Draft, ranked third among qualifying NL rookies in hitting, was tied for second with nine runs scored and finished fourth in hits. He also led all rookies with a club-high five game-winning RBI in his first month in the majors.
- May 7 – Toronto Blue Jays pitcher J. A. Happ is struck in the head by a batted ball hit by Tampa Bay Rays outfielder Desmond Jennings. Happ suffers a head contusion and a left ear laceration. He leaves the field on a stretcher.
- May 10:
  - Shelby Miller is perfect after allowing a leadoff single by Eric Young, Jr., retiring 27 in a row for his first career complete game, in a St. Louis Cardinals 3–0 victory over the Colorado Rockies.
  - Jon Lester hurls a one-hit, complete game shutout, to lead the Boston Red Sox to a 5–0 victory over the Toronto Blue Jays. Almost perfect, Lester retires the first 17 batters he faces before giving up a double to Maicer Izturis in the bottom of the sixth inning. After that, he retires the last Toronto 10 batters in succession. Besides, it is the 9,000th regular season victory in Red Sox history.
  - Alex Cobb of the Tampa Bay Rays strikes out 13 in 4 2/3 innings against the San Diego Padres, recording 12 of the 14 outs by strikeouts, four of them in the third inning, when a wild pitch on strike three allows Will Venable to reach base. The other outs are recorded on grounders to shortstop in the first and third base in the fourth. The Rays won, 6–3, but Cobb does not get a decision. Nevertheless, Cobb becomes the first pitcher in major league history to strike out 13 while failing to complete five innings.
- May 11 – St. Louis Cardinals pitcher Adam Wainwright retires the first 13 batters faced in his start against the Colorado Rockies. Combined with the 27 straight outs hurled by Shelby Miller in his perfect game the previous day, the Cardinals tied a Major League Baseball record for most consecutive outs by one team against another at 40, set by the Texas Rangers on May 3–4, 1996. A one-out walk to Todd Helton in the 5th inning ends the perfect streak, though Wainwright keeps the no-hitter going until the 7th and ends up with a 3–0, two-hit shutout.
- May 12 – Chris Sale of the Chicago White Sox is not perfect against the Los Angeles Angels, but he is about as close as possible. Sale gives up just one hit to Mike Trout in the top of the seventh inning in a dominant 3–0 win. He walks no one, strikes out seven, and faces just one more batter than the minimum.
- May 13 – Justin Masterson pitches a four-hitter for his second shutout this season, leading the Cleveland Indians over the New York Yankees, 1–0. Masterson (6–2) also had a shutout against the Chicago White Sox on April 12, becoming the first Cleveland pitcher to record two complete-game shutouts in the same season since Bud Black and Greg Swindell did it in 1989.
- May 14 – The Philadelphia Phillies have signed 17-year-old German outfielder Julsan Kamara to a seven-year minor league contract, according to Philipp Wuerfel of Mister Baseball.com. Considered one of Germany's best prospects, Kamara attended the MLB European Academy in Tyrrhenia, Italy. He is a member of the German Junior National Team, and competed in last winter's International Power Showcase at Marlins Park in Miami.
- May 18 – Gerardo Parra of the Arizona Diamondbacks hits a home run off the first pitch of the game from Tom Koehler, which holds up as the only run in the D-backs' 1–0 win against the Miami Marlins. It is the first MLB game in which a first-pitch homer was the only score since September 2, 1963, when Pete Rose's first-pitch shot gave the Cincinnati Reds a 1–0 win over the New York Mets.
- May 19:
  - Justin Masterson strikes out a season-high 11 in seven shutout innings to help the Cleveland Indians beat Félix Hernández and the Seattle Mariners, 6–0. The Indians topple yet another former Cy Young Award winner, improving to 7–1 this season against Cy Young recipients. Before Hernández, Cleveland defeated R. A. Dickey (April 2), David Price (April 7), Roy Halladay (April 30), Cliff Lee (May 1), Bartolo Colón (May 9) and Justin Verlander (May 11), with Jake Peavy being the only winner in these contests (April 14).
  - Miguel Cabrera belts three home runs in a losing cause against the Texas Rangers, who collect 18 hits en route to an 11–8 victory over the visiting Detroit Tigers. Cabrera, the 2012 AL Triple Crown winner, becomes the 23rd player in MLB history to go 4-for-4 with at least three homers, five RBI and four runs scored. The previous 22 all were on the winning team.
- May 21 – Mike Trout hits for the cycle and drives in five runs, scores two times and steals a base, in the Los Angeles Angels' 12–0 rout of the Seattle Mariners at Angel Stadium. At 21 years, 288 days of age, Trout becomes the sixth-youngest player in MLB history to hit for a cycle, being surpassed only by Mel Ott (20-75 in 1929), Cliff Heathcote (20-140 in 1918), Arky Vaughan (21-107 in 1933), César Cedeño (21-159 in 1972) and Mike Tiernan (21-21 in 1888).
- May 24 – At Comerica Park, Aníbal Sánchez of the Detroit Tigers has his bid for a second career no-hitter broken up in the ninth as the Minnesota Twins' Joe Mauer singles with one out. The hit is the only one Sánchez allows as the Tigers defeat the Twins 6–0. Sánchez, who no-hit the Arizona Diamondbacks while pitching for the Florida Marlins in 2006, was bidding to become the sixth pitcher to throw no-hitters in both leagues, joining Cy Young, Jim Bunning, Nolan Ryan, Hideo Nomo and Randy Johnson. Mauer, who also broke up no-hit bids in the ninth inning in 2008 and 2010, becomes only the second player, after Horace Clarke, to break up three no-hitters in the ninth inning; all three bids Clarke broke up were during a one-month span in 1970.
- May 30:
  - The New York Mets sweep the New York Yankees for the first time in Subway Series history by completing a 3–1 victory at Yankee Stadium. Dillon Gee strikes out a career-high 12 and limits the Yankees to four hits over 7 1/3 innings, while Marlon Byrd blasts a two-run, second-deck home run. The Mets outscore their crosstown rivals in the sweep, 16–7, with the first two games played at Citi Field. Since the start of interleague play in 1997, the only Subway Series sweep had been performed by the Yankees, when they went 6–0 in 2003.
  - Jacoby Ellsbury of the Boston Red Sox steals a team-record five bases in a 9–2 victory against the host Philadelphia Phillies. However, none of the steals leads to any runs. The five stolen bases are the most for a major league player since Tampa Bay's Carl Crawford stole six bases against the Red Sox on May 3, 2009.

=== June ===
- June 1 – Paul Goldschmidt hits a tiebreaking grand slam in the eighth inning, leading the Arizona Diamondbacks to a 12–4 win over the Chicago Cubs. Arizona snaps the Cubs five-game winning streak, which they started on May 26 against the Cincinnati Reds.
- June 2 – Garrett Jones of the Pittsburgh Pirates becomes the second major league player to hit a home run out of PNC Park and into the Allegheny River on the fly. The home run comes in the eighth inning off Cincinnati Reds' Jonathan Broxton and ties the game 4–4; the Pirates win in the tenth inning on Travis Snider's RBI single. Daryle Ward had been the only other player to reach the Allegheny on the fly, doing it for the Houston Astros on July 6, 2002.
- June 3:
  - Miguel Cabrera of the Detroit Tigers and Domonic Brown of the Philadelphia Phillies are named Player of the Month in the American League and National League respectively. The reigning Triple Crown winner and defending American League MVP batted .379 (44 for 116) with nine doubles, 12 home runs, 33 runs batted in and 23 runs scored in 28 games. Cabrera also becomes the first player in Major League history to enter June batting at least .340 with 15 homers and 60 RBIs. Also in 28 games, Brown led the National League with 12 home runs and 25 RBI, tying Cabrera for the Major League lead in homers while ranking fourth overall in RBI. In addition, he had 89 total bases which was good for third in the Majors, and was slugging at .688 for the second-highest mark in the National League, while posting a .303 (33 for 109) batting average.
  - Jason Vargas of the Los Angeles Angels and Patrick Corbin of the Arizona Diamondbacks earn Pitcher of the Month honors in their respective leagues. Vargas compiled a perfect 5–0 record with a 2.30 earned run average, one shutout, 31 strikeouts and 14 walks in 43.0 innings pitched over six starts, and qualified among AL starters with a minimum of 27.0 innings pitched, ending first in wins and second in innings pitched and ERA. Like Vargas, Corbin was a perfect 5–0 in five May starts. His 1.53 ERA was the lowest among qualifying NL pitchers and ranks second in the majors. With an undefeated 9–0 record in 2013, Corbin led the majors in wins while his 2.06 ERA ranked fourth among qualifying starters.
  - Nate Freiman of the Oakland Athletics is voted American League Rookie of the Month for May. The Athletics have now claimed two of the last three rookie honors after Yoenis Céspedes was selected in September 2012. Freiman batted .351 (13 for 37) with three doubles, one home run and nine RBI in 14 games, tallying four multi-hit games during the stretch. He compiled a career-best four-game hitting streak from May 26–29, going 6-for-11 (.545) with seven RBI as Oakland goes 4–0 during the streak. Among AL rookies, the 26-year-old first baseman finished second in RBI, tied for fourth in doubles, for sixth in hits and homers, and was eighth overall in at-bats.
  - In the National League, Atlanta Braves catcher Evan Gattis is named Rookie of the Month for May. This is his second monthly award after being voted NL Rookie of the Month for April; he becomes the first player to win back-to-back NL rookie honors since his Atlanta teammate Jason Heyward earned the distinction in April and May 2010. In 22 games in May, Gattis led all Major League rookies with 16 RBI, while his six home runs were tied for first with San Diego Padres infielder Jedd Gyorko. Gattis also ranked among MLB rookie leaders with 11 extra-base hits (T-2nd), 13 runs scored (T-3rd), 43 total bases (T-3rd) and five doubles (T-5th), while hitting .303 (20-for-63) with a .683 slugging percentage and a .362 on-base percentage.
- June 8 – Andy Pettitte holds the Seattle Mariners to three hits over 7 1/3 innings, to earn his 250th career victory in leading the New York Yankees to a 3–1 victory at Safeco Field. As usual, the Yankees count on their veteran closer Mariano Rivera, who comes in to notch his 630th career save and 36th in 38 chances against Seattle. According to Elias Sports Bureau, Pettitte becomes the 47th pitcher in major league history to reach the 250-win milestone and the fifth to do it in a Yankees uniform, joining Red Ruffing (1942), Roger Clemens (2000), Randy Johnson (2000) and Mike Mussina (2007).
- June 9 – Ryan Dempster leads the Boston Red Sox to victory over the Los Angeles Angels, 10–5, at Fenway Park. Along the way, Dempster picks up career strikeout No. 2,000, becoming the 69th pitcher in major league history to reach that mark and just the second born in Canada.
- June 10 – Brandon Phillips belts a grand slam and matches his career high with six runs batted in, when the Cincinnati Reds defeat the Chicago Cubs, 6–2, at Wrigley Field. His six RBI give him 615 for his career, surpassing the 612 runs driven in by Joe Morgan for the most as a Cincinnati second baseman.
- June 12:
  - Major League Baseball and the Major League Baseball Players Association jointly announce that the 2014 regular season will open in Sydney, Australia with a two-game series between the Arizona Diamondbacks and Los Angeles Dodgers on March 22 and 23 at the Sydney Cricket Ground.
  - Officials of Nippon Professional Baseball admit that they had introduced new, livelier balls for the current season, after previously denying that a marked increase in home runs from last season was due to changes in the ball.
- June 15 – Henry Blanco debuts with the Seattle Mariners in grand fashion, batting the first pitch he sees from A. J. Griffin, for a grand slam that account for all of Seattle's runs in a 4–0 victory over the Oakland Athletics at The Coliseum. The blast breaks a scoreless tie in the sixth inning and was more than enough to help Félix Hernández improve to 8–4 after dealing his fourth scoreless outing of the season. The 41-year-old Blanco, in his 16th Major League season with 11 teams, is best known as a defensive specialist catcher, with a career 40.7 percent caught-stealing rate. A .226 hitter in 936 games, he also becomes the oldest Mariner to ever hit a grand slam.
- June 22 – Francisco Rodríguez of the Milwaukee Brewers hurls a scoreless ninth inning against the Atlanta Braves to earn his sixth straight save of the season and the 300th of his career. Rodríguez becomes the 25th closer in major league history to reach the 300-save milestone, which ties him with Jason Isringhausen and Bruce Sutter for 23rd on the all-time list.
- June 24 – James Loney, Wil Myers and Sam Fuld of the Tampa Bay Rays bat three consecutive home runs off pitcher Esmil Rogers, helping Jeremy Hellickson beat the Toronto Blue Jays, 4–1, to end Toronto's 11-game winning streak. It is the first time the Rays have gone back-to-back-to-back at Tropicana Field. The only other time Tampa Bay hit three consecutive homers was on June 9, 2008, when Evan Longoria, Willy Aybar and Dioner Navarro went deep against the host Anaheim Angels.
- June 28 – Gerrit Cole paces the Pittsburgh Pirates to a 9–3 victory over the Milwaukee Brewers at PNC Park, to become the first Pittsburgh pitcher to win his first four starts since Nick Maddox in 1907.
- June 30 – Jeff Mathis belts a grand slam with one out in the ninth inning that lifts the Miami Marlins over the San Diego Padres, 6–2, at Marlins Park, in what marks the 3,000th home run and fourth walk-off grand slam in the Marlins' 20-year history.

=== July ===
- July 1 – At Target Field, Andy Pettitte breaks Whitey Ford's all-time record for most strikeouts by a New York Yankee pitcher. In the fifth inning of the Yankees' 10–4 victory over the Minnesota Twins, Pettitte strikes out Justin Morneau for his 1,958th strikeout as a Yankee.
- July 2:
  - At Great American Ball Park, Homer Bailey of the Cincinnati Reds no-hits the San Francisco Giants 3–0. A seventh-inning walk to Gregor Blanco, who is erased by a heads-up defensive play by Joey Votto as he tried going from first to third, is the only baserunner yielded by Bailey, who had also pitched the Major League's last no-hitter, against the Pittsburgh Pirates on September 28, 2012. Bailey joins Johnny Vander Meer and Jim Maloney as Reds pitchers with multiple no-hitters and joins Addie Joss, Vander Meer, Allie Reynolds, Warren Spahn and Nolan Ryan (twice) as pitchers who have accounted for consecutive MLB no-hitters (Vander Meer's were in consecutive starts in 1938). It is also the second consecutive year a defending World Series champion has been no-hit; the 2011 World Champion St. Louis Cardinals were victims of New York Met Johan Santana's no-hitter on June 1, 2012. Notably, this game was an MLB Network Showcase game, with Reds legend Sean Casey in the booth for MLB Network.
  - The Baltimore Orioles acquire starter Scott Feldman and catcher Steve Clevenger from the Chicago Cubs in exchange for starter Jake Arrieta, reliever Pedro Strop, and international bonus pool money. The Orioles send $388,100 for the slots 3 and 4 to the Cubs, which became the first MLB transaction involving international bonus pool money.
- July 3:
  - In the National League, Yasiel Puig of the Los Angeles Dodgers becomes the first man to earn the Major League Baseball Player of the Month Award during his first MLB month since the honor was established in 1958. The 22-year-old Cuban outfielder batted .436 with a .467 on-base percentage and slugged .713 in 27 games, including five doubles, one triple, seven homers and four stolen bases. His 44 base hits were the second-most ever by a first-month player behind Yankees' Joe DiMaggio, who batted 48 in May 1936. In addition, Puig is also voted the NL Rookie of the Month, marking just the fifth time since it was introduced in 2001 that a position player or pitcher of the month award winner has garnered rookie honors in the same calendar month. Puig joins Dontrelle Willis (FLA, June 2003), Ryan Braun (MIL, July 2007), Jeremy Hellickson (TB, May 2011) and Mike Trout (LAA, July 2012) as the only players to accomplish the rare double feat.
  - Jason Kipnis of the Cleveland Indians is named the American League Player of the Month Award for his performance at the plate in June. The second baseman earns the recognition after batting .419 (39 for 93) with 12 doubles, four home runs, 25 RBIs and 17 runs scored. He reached base in all 27 games in which he appeared and compiled a .517 on-base percentage and a .699 slugging percentage.
  - Cuban infielder José Iglesias becomes the first Boston Red Sox player to win the American League Rookie of the Month Award since Jacoby Ellsbury in 2007. The 23-year-old rookie put together a career-high 18-game hitting streak from May 27–June 18 and finished the month first in batting average (.395), on-base percentage (.453), slugging percentage (.523), on-base plus slugging (.976), at-bats (86), base hits (34) and runs scored (17) among qualifying AL rookies with at least 81 plate appearances. He also collected four doubles, two triples, one home run, six RBIs and two stolen bases.
  - Max Scherzer leads the Detroit Tigers to a 6–2 victory over the Toronto Blue Jays, to become the first pitcher in 27 years to get off to a 13–0 start. Scherzer ties Ron Guidry, who also went 13–0 in 1978. Only three starting pitchers in the Live Ball Era have had a better undefeated start to a season: Johnny Allen (15–0, 1937), Dave McNally (15–0, 1960), and Roger Clemens (14–0, 1986).
- July 9 – David Ortiz goes 4-for-5 with a home run, two doubles and a stolen base in the Boston Red Sox' 11–8 victory over the Seattle Mariners at Safeco Field. Ortiz now has 1,688 hits as a designated hitter, tying the record set by Harold Baines.
- July 10 – David Ortiz bats a second-inning double off Aaron Harang to pass Harold Baines for most hits all-time by a designated hitter with 1,689 and hit a two-run home run an inning later, leading the Boston Red Sox to an 11–4 win over the Seattle Mariners at Safeco Field. Ortiz already holds the marks for the most runs scored (1,018), doubles (432), home runs (370), extra-base hits (819) and RBI (1,209) by a designated hitter in Major League Baseball history.
- July 12 – Jarred Cosart of the Houston Astros nearly pitches a no-hitter against David Price and the Tampa Bay Rays in his MLB debut, to end the Rays' season-best eight-game winning streak. The first hit allowed by Cosart is a one-out single to Ben Zobrist in the seventh inning. The 23-year-old right-hander finishes with eight innings of shutout ball and allows just two hits in Houston's 2–1 win. José Veras, who gives up an unearned run, is credited with the save.
- July 13:
  - Tim Lincecum of the San Francisco Giants no-hits the San Diego Padres 9–0 at Petco Park, the first no-hitter ever pitched in that stadium, striking out 13 and throwing 148 pitches. Giant right fielder Hunter Pence preserves the no-hitter by making a diving catch of Alexi Amarista's sinking line drive to end the eighth inning. Lincecum, the losing pitcher in Homer Bailey's no-hitter eleven days earlier, becomes the first no-hit pitcher who is also on the losing end of a no-hitter during the same season since Juan Marichal in 1963. The 13 strikeouts are the second-most by a Giant in pitching a no-hitter, after the 14 in Matt Cain's perfect game in 2012.
  - At Comerica Park, the Texas Rangers defeat the Detroit Tigers 7–1 and hand Max Scherzer his first loss of the season in 15 decisions. Scherzer was bidding to become the first pitcher to begin a season 14–0 since Roger Clemens in 1986, as well as become the first pitcher to enter the All-Star break 14–0, breaking Dave McNally's 44-year record for best undefeated record at the All-Star break. McNally had gone 13–0 into the All-Star break in 1969; he would eventually go 15–0 before finally losing one.
- July 14 – Matt Davidson is named Futures Game MVP after drilling a go-ahead two-run home run in the fourth inning, as the U.S. squad beat the World team, 4–2, at Citi Field. At 22, Davidson is ranked as the Arizona Diamondbacks' No. 2 prospect and No. 62 overall on MLB.com's Top 100 Prospects list.
- July 15:
  - Yoenis Céspedes becomes the first player not selected for the All-Star Game to claim the Home Run Derby title. In his second major league season, the Cuban outfielder, who plays with the Oakland Athletics, beats Washington Nationals outfielder Bryce Harper, 9–8, in the final round of the event held at Citi Field. Céspedes posts a total of 32 home runs, including 17 in the first round and the decisive drive with five swings to spare, to tie for third in the all-time list with David Ortiz (2010) and Robinson Canó (2011) behind Bobby Abreu and Josh Hamilton. who batted 41 (2005) and 35 (2008), respectively.
  - Matt Davidson of the Reno Aces bests Memphis Redbirds first baseman Brock Peterson to win the 2013 Triple-A All Star Home Run Derby. Davidson, a slugger third baseman who won Futures Game MVP honors a day before, connects 11 home runs across the three rounds, including seven in the first round, to surpass Peterson's 10.
- July 16 – Mariano Rivera, pitching in his final MLB All-Star Game, throws 11 of his 16 pitches for strikes in the eighth inning, as the American League defeats the National League, 3–0. In his 19-year career, Rivera pitched nine All-Star innings and never allowed an earned run while collecting four saves. In this game he earns a hold, and then the 2013 All-Star Game MVP award.
- July 22 – Ryan Braun of the Milwaukee Brewers is suspended for the remainder of the regular season–65 games—for his connection to Biogenesis of America, a clinic accused of distributing performance-enhancing drugs. The 65-game ban is 15 games more than the ban that Braun, the 2011 National League Most Valuable Player, avoided in 2012; in that case, an arbitrator overturned his positive test for elevated testosterone because the urine sample had been improperly handled.
- July 28 – David Ortiz goes 4 for 4, including a three-run home run, to help the Boston Red Sox beat the host Baltimore Orioles, 6–0. It is the 11th year Ortiz has hit at least 20 home runs in a Red Sox uniform, which ties him with Jim Rice and Dwight Evans for the second most in Red Sox history. The franchise record of 16 seasons is held by Ted Williams. No other player has more than eight.
- July 30:
  - In a three-team, seven-player deal, the Boston Red Sox send José Iglesias and three minor league prospects to the Detroit Tigers; Detroit ships Avisail García and the same prospects to the Chicago White Sox in exchange for Jake Peavy, then send Peavy and Brayan Villarreal to Boston to complete the transaction.
  - Andre Rienzo of the Cleveland Indians becomes the first Brazilian-born pitcher to play in the major leagues. Rienzo does not allow an earned run and gives up only five hits in seven innings, as he picks up a no-decision in the Indians' 7–4 victory against the visiting Chicago White Sox. Rienzo also faces Yan Gomes, the first Brazilian-born player in major league history, who collects a hit in their first confrontation.

=== August ===
- August 2 – Jarred Cosart of the Houston Astros holds the Minnesota Twins to one run and five hits over seven innings, but he did not factor into the decision in Astros' 4–3 loss in 13 innings. Cosart, who almost pitched a no-hitter in his debut on July 12, becomes the first pitcher since Cincinnati Reds' Wayne Simpson in 1970 to give up one earned run or fewer and throw at least six innings in each of his first four career appearances.
- August 5:
  - Adrián Beltré of the Texas Rangers and Jayson Werth of the Washington Nationals are named Player of the Month in the American League and National League respectively. Beltré earns his third such honor with the Rangers and fourth overall, while batting a .369 average with four doubles, nine home runs, 19 RBIs and 13 runs scored over 26 games, which includes 69 total bases and his seventh career walk-off homer. Werth amassed ten multi-hit games over the course of the month, ending with a second-best .367 average, 56 total bases, 17 runs scored and a .622 slugging percentage (fourth). It is the first career Player of the Month Award for Werth and the first ever for the Nationals. Vladimir Guerrero was that franchise's last player to receive the honor while with the Montreal Expos in 2003.
  - Chris Archer of the Tampa Bay Rays and Clayton Kershaw of the Los Angeles Dodgers earn Pitcher of the Month honors in their respective leagues. Archer also becomes the sixth player to win the Pitcher and Rookie of the Month awards since the latter was introduced in 2001, after posting a perfect 4–0 record with a 0.73 ERA, two shutouts, seven walks and 22 strikeouts in 37 innings of work. Kershaw went 4–1 in six starts and leads the National League with a 1.34 ERA, allowing only seven earned runs in 47 innings, also a league lead. He notched 43 strikeouts for the month and issued just two walks, tying for first in wins while holding opposing hitters to a .161 batting average. The NL Rookie of the Month award is presented to José Fernández of the Miami Marlins, who posted a 3–1 record and a 2.06 ERA through five starts. The highest point of his stellar month was his July 28 outing against the Pittsburgh Pirates and his fellow prospect Gerrit Cole, by surrendering two runs on five hits in eight innings and striking out 13 batters without any walks. Fernández joins Gary Nolan (15 strikeouts, 1967), Dwight Gooden (two 16-strikeout games, 1984) and Kerry Wood (20 strikeouts, 1998) as the only pitchers younger than 21 to strike out 13 batters or more without a walk in a single game. Fernández also turned in a perfect inning of relief in the All-Star Game on July 16, when he retired current MLB home run leader Chris Davis and former American League Most Valuable Player Award winners Dustin Pedroia and Miguel Cabrera.
  - Major League Baseball suspends Alex Rodriguez through the end of the 2014 season and bans 12 others for 50 games—including All-Stars Nelson Cruz, Everth Cabrera and Jhonny Peralta—for their connection the Biogenesis baseball scandal.
- August 7 – The MLB Players Association files a formal appeal of the 211-game suspension that Major League Baseball levied against Alex Rodriguez for his relationship with the Biogenesis of America clinic. The suspension was to begin on August 8 and last through the 2014 season, but Rodriguez will be allowed to play until the grievance has been heard by arbitrator Fredric Horowitz, which is not expected until at least November.
- August 8 – Max Scherzer becomes the first Detroit Tigers pitcher ever to go 17–1 in his first 18 decisions while the Tigers complete their first four-game sweep of the Cleveland Indians in 25 years. No major league pitcher has been 17–1 through 18 starts since New York Yankees' Roger Clemens in 2001. Just two other big league pitchers, Pittsburgh Pirates' Roy Face in 1959 and Brooklyn Dodgers' Don Newcombe in 1955, have done it since New York Giants' Rube Marquard's historic 19–0 start in 1912.
- August 9 – Oakland Athletics outfielder Josh Reddick puts an end to his 0-for-20 slump in a powerful way, hitting three home runs in a 13–6 victory against the Toronto Blue Jays at Rogers Centre.
- August 10 – Josh Reddick of the Oakland Athletics belts two home runs in a loss to the Toronto Blue Jays, to become the first big leaguer since 2004 and just the 23rd ever to hit five home runs over two consecutive games with multiple homers in each contest, a feat which has been accomplished only 25 times since the 1916 season.
- August 13 – Brad Miller hits two home runs as the Seattle Mariners top the Tampa Bay Rays, 5–4, at Tropicana Field. Ben Zobrist matches Miller with a pair of homers for the Rays, as they both homer to lead off the first inning and then go deep again in the fifth. It was just the third time in Major League Baseball history that leadoff hitters for both clubs homer in their first at-bat and then hit another later in the game. Joe Morgan did it for the Houston Astros on July 8, 1965, while Felipe Alou of the Milwaukee Brewers also clubbed a pair of homers from the top spot in the order in the same contest at County Stadium. The other came on June 5, 1994, when Chuck Knoblauch of the Minnesota Twins and Tony Phillips of the Detroit Tigers accomplished the double feat at Tiger Stadium.
- August 16 – Charlie Manuel, the winningest manager in Philadelphia Phillies history, is dismissed just four days from earning his 1,000th career managerial victory. The Phillies' third-base coach Ryne Sandberg is named interim manager. Manuel ends his nine-year tenure as Phillies manager with a 1,416–780 record, five straight National League East titles from 2007 to 2011 and two National League pennants, while guiding his team to the 2008 World Series title, the second in franchise history. Nevertheless, he becomes the first victim of a disappointing season for the Phillies, in which injuries and widespread underperformance lead the team to a 53–67 record at the time of his dismissal. Previously, Manuel spent three years as manager with the Cleveland Indians, leading them to the AL Central title in 2001, compiling a 220–190 record as Indians manager.
- August 17 – Miguel Tejada is suspended for 105 games after testing positive for an amphetamine which was in violation of Major League Baseball's Joint Drug Prevention and Treatment Program. The suspension is the third-longest non-lifetime suspension handed out by Major League Baseball, after the 211-game ban handed to Alex Rodriguez on August 5 of this season and a 119-game ban handed to Steve Howe in 1992.
- August 18 – Ryne Sandberg earns his first win as a major league manager, when the Philadelphia Phillies benefit from two ninth-inning errors by shortstop Hanley Ramírez to beat the visiting Los Angeles Dodgers, 3–2, snapping the Dodgers' 10-game winning streak.
- August 21 – Ichiro Suzuki collects his 4,000th hit in a career split between the Major Leagues and Japan. In the New York Yankees' 4–2 victory over the Toronto Blue Jays at Yankee Stadium, Suzuki lines a first-inning single off the Jays' R. A. Dickey, the ball eluding third baseman Brett Lawrie. Suzuki also breaks a tie with Lou Gehrig with this, his 2,722nd Major League hit in his 13th season. Previously, Suzuki amassed 1,278 hits in nine seasons in Japan's Pacific League.
- August 24 – In the seventh annual Civil Rights Game, the Chicago White Sox defeat the Texas Rangers, 3–2, at U.S. Cellular Field in Chicago.

=== September ===
- September 3 – The Pittsburgh Pirates, aided by Andrew McCutchen's 100th career home run and Travis Snider's ninth-inning pinch-hit home run, end their North American sports league record of 20 consecutive losing seasons by defeating the Milwaukee Brewers, 4–3, at Miller Park. The victory is the Pirates' 81st of the season and assures them of their first non-losing season since 1992, when they won the National League East title.
- September 4:
  - Miguel Cabrera of the Detroit Tigers and Martín Prado of the Arizona Diamondbacks are named Player of the Month in the American League and National League respectively. Cabrera, the reigning AL MVP and 2012 Triple Crown winner, earns his fourth career monthly award and second of the current season. He posted a .356 batting average with a .430 on-base percentage for the month and a .733 slugging percentage, which included 11 home runs, five doubles and 31 RBI. Cabrera's month was highlighted by a four-game stretch of multiple-hit games from August 9–12, including a .538 average while hitting a double, three homers, five RBI and four runs in three games against the New York Yankees. Prado, acquired by Arizona prior the season, led the National League with 30 RBI and 43 hits, while his .375 average was the fourth-best mark in the league and his 65 total bases were the second-highest number in the circuit. He also tied for fifth in runs (19), while his slugging percentage (.565) and on-base percentage (.425) both ranked him ninth.
  - Iván Nova of the New York Yankees and Zack Greinke of the Los Angeles Dodgers earn Pitcher of the Month honors in their respective leagues. Nova finished the month with a perfect 4–0 record and a 2.08 ERA, including one complete-game three-hit shutout. He also collected 12 walks and 31 strikeouts in 43 1/3 innings over six starts to claim his first career monthly award. Greinke, who previously won an AL Pitcher of the Month Award in April 2009 as a member the Kansas City Royals, went 5–0 with 30 strikeouts and eight walks over 36 2/3 innings of work, posting a 1.23 ERA in the process. For the second consecutive month, a Dodgers pitcher takes home NL Pitcher of the Month honors. Clayton Kershaw claimed the Award for July.
  - Martín Pérez of the Texas Rangers is voted American League Rookie of the Month for August. The 22-year left-handed pitcher won all five of his starts in the month, while collecting a 3.06 ERA with 26 strikeouts and 11 walks in 35 1/3 innings pitched, to become the only Texas rookie ever to win five consecutive starts and the first pitcher overall to do so since Ryan Dempster won five straight from August 20–September 12 of 2012. Pérez also led AL rookies in wins, ending second in innings and fourth in strikeouts. José Fernández of the Miami Marlins is named Rookie of the Month in the National League, to become the first rookie pitcher to receive the Award in back-to-back months since Josh Johnson in May and June 2006. Fernández went 3–1 in six starts, allowing six earned runs in 39 innings for a 1.15 ERA – the second lowest among qualifying rookie pitchers (Alex Wood, 0.90) and the third lowest in the league overall (Clayton Kershaw, 1.01) in August. Fernández also held opposing hitters to a paltry .158 batting average, the lowest mark among qualifying Major League pitchers. He also struck out 49 batters in 39 innings, allowing 11 walks, while breaking his own franchise rookie record with 14 strikeouts against the Cleveland Indians on August 2. He previously set the franchise mark with 13 strikeouts in his final July start against the Pittsburgh Pirates.
- September 6 – In defeating his former team, the Arizona Diamondbacks, 3–0 at AT&T Park, Yusmeiro Petit of the San Francisco Giants has a bid for a perfect game broken up with two out in the ninth and a two-strike count. After retiring the first 26 batters, Petit, who strikes out seven, gets to a 2–2 count on Eric Chavez and narrowly misses throwing the next pitch for the third strike. One pitch later, Chavez lines a ball to right field that falls in for a hit despite Hunter Pence's attempt to make a diving catch (ironically, Pence, who scores all three Giant runs including an eight-inning home run, had made a diving catch to preserve Tim Lincecum's no-hitter on July 13). The hit is the only baserunner Petit allows; he retires the next batter, A. J. Pollock, for the final out. With teammate Matt Cain having pitched his perfect game a year earlier, the Giants would have joined the New York Yankees as the only teams to record perfect games in back-to-back seasons, David Wells having pitched his in 1998 and David Cone pitching his in 1999. It is also the first time that two perfect game bids were broken up with two out in the ninth in the same season, Yu Darvish of the Texas Rangers having his bid broken up on April 2.
- September 8 – The International Olympic Committee votes to reinstate wrestling as an Olympic Sport for the 2020 Summer Olympics in Tokyo. The vote bypasses a joint bid by baseball and softball.
- September 9 – In defeating the Texas Rangers 1–0, the Pittsburgh Pirates clinch their first winning season since 1992.
- September 11 – The defending World Champion San Francisco Giants are eliminated from postseason contention, thus the 2000 New York Yankees remain baseball's last repeat World Champions.
- September 13 – In the Baltimore Orioles' 5–3 victory over the Toronto Blue Jays at the Rogers Centre, Chris Davis hits his 50th home run of the season, tying the single-season franchise record set by Brady Anderson in 1996. With 40 doubles, Davis also becomes the third player in Major League history with 50 home runs and 40 doubles in the same season, joining Babe Ruth in 1921 and Albert Belle in 1995.
- September 14 – Vladimir Guerrero formally announces his retirement after failing to secure a contract this season. A nine-time All Star, the Dominican slugger spent 16 major league seasons as an outfielder and designated hitter from 1996 to 2011, playing for the Montreal Expos, Anaheim/Los Angeles Angels, Texas Rangers and Baltimore Orioles, while winning the 2004 American MVP Award and eight Silver Slugger trophies. Guerrero posted a .318 career average with 449 home runs and 1,496 RBIs in 2147 games, which included 2,590 hits, 1,328 runs scored, 181 stolen bases, and 4,506 total bases.
- September 15 – Wladimir Balentien of the Yakult Swallows breaks Sadaharu Oh's 49-year Nippon Professional Baseball record for most home runs in a season, hitting his 56th and 57th home runs in a 9–0 victory over the Hanshin Tigers. Oh had held the previous record of 55 in 1964 while playing for the Yomiuri Giants.
- September 19:
  - The Los Angeles Dodgers defeat the host Arizona Diamondbacks, 7–6, to capture the National League West Division title, while becoming the first team to claim a playoff berth in 2013. The Dodgers were in last place in the West through most of May and all of June, trailing by as many as 9 1/2 games, after their 30–42 start. Since then, the Dodgers posted a Major League-best 58–23 and extended their margin over second-place Arizona by 10 1/2 games. This will be the first appearance for the Dodgers in the postseason since 2009, when they lost the National League Championship Series to the Philadelphia Phillies, four games to one. They have not been to the World Series since winning it all in 1988.
  - Boston Red Sox closer Koji Uehara ends his streak of 37 consecutive batters retired, as well as his 30 1/3-inning scoreless streak, when he allows a Danny Valencia leadoff triple and Matt Wieters to hit a sacrifice fly to score pinch runner Alexi Casilla, in the Baltimore Orioles' victory over the Red Sox, 3–2, at Fenway Park. In the top of the sixth, Chris Davis launches his 51st home run of the season off Boston starter Ryan Dempster, a towering shot to center field that ties the game at 2. 51 sets an Orioles season record, surpassing Brady Anderson, who clubbed 50 homers in 1996.
- September 20:
  - The Boston Red Sox clinch the American League East Division title, getting seven strong innings from Jon Lester in his 100th career victory to beat the Toronto Blue Jays, 6–3, at Fenway Park. It is a stunning turnaround that comes just one year after the Red Sox complete a 13-month epic collapse that started in September 2011, when they blew a nine-game lead in the wild card and miss the playoffs with a loss on the final day of the season.
  - Alex Rodriguez hits a tie-breaking grand slam in the seventh inning off San Francisco Giants pitcher George Kontos, leading the New York Yankees to a 5–1 victory at Yankee Stadium. Rodriguez establishes a Major League record with his 24th career grand slam, breaking a tie with past Yankees legend Lou Gehrig for the most career grand slams on the all-time list. The blast caps an emotional day for the Yankees, as veteran left-hander Andy Pettitte announces his retirement during the afternoon.
- September 21 – A. J. Burnett of the Pittsburgh Pirates strikes out a season-high 12 in a 4–2 victory over the Cincinnati Reds, becoming the first right-handed pitcher in the 126-year history of the franchise to top 200 strikeouts in a season, when he fans Joey Votto in the sixth inning. The previous franchise record for a righty had been set by Mark Baldwin, who had 197 strikeouts in the 1891 season. In the modern era, Kris Benson recorded 184 in 2000, Bob Friend 183 in 1960, and Bert Blyleven 182 in 1978. Burnett also became the first Pittsburgh pitcher to post 200 whiffs since left-handed Óliver Pérez did it in 2004.
- September 22
  - The Boston Red Sox honor Hall of Famer Carl Yastrzemski with a statue outside the right field entrance of Fenway Park. In a 30-minute ceremony, Mayor Tom Menino proclaims it Carl Yastrzemski Day for the city of Boston.
  - Ryne Sandberg signs a three-year contract to be the 52nd manager in Philadelphia Phillies history. Sandberg became interim manager in August as a replacement for Charlie Manuel. At 53, he will be the first full-time manager who had a Hall of Fame playing career since Frank Robinson served as the manager of the Montreal Expos/Washington Nationals franchise from 2002 through 2006.
  - Mariano Rivera is honored by the New York Yankees before a game against the San Francisco Giants at Yankee Stadium. The 50-minute ceremony includes visits from former Yankees teammates, the retiring of Rivera's uniform number 42, and the heavy metal rock band Metallica performing the song Enter Sandman, used by Rivera as his entrance song. The tribute to Rivera is followed by Andy Pettitte taking a no-hitter into the sixth inning of his final career home game, but the way the game ends might end the Yankees' playoff hopes, as they lose to the Giants 2–1.
  - The Miami Marlins embrace the role of spoiler, helping the Atlanta Braves win the National League East Division title and pushing the St. Louis Cardinals into the postseason playoffs with a 4–2 victory over the Washington Nationals. It is the first title for Atlanta since 2005. Meanwhile, the Kansas City Royals' walk-off 4–0 win over the Texas Rangers in 10 innings not only gives the Royals additional hope in the American League wild card race, it also locks up the Oakland Athletics as the winners of the American League West Division for the second time in as many years.
- September 23:
  - The Pittsburgh Pirates clinch their first playoff berth since 1992 when they beat the Chicago Cubs, 2–1, while the Washington Nationals are eliminated by the St. Louis Cardinals. The Cincinnati Reds also clinch at least a wild card berth when they defeat the New York Mets 3–2 in 10 innings. The Pirates and Reds, both with a 90–67 record, now trail St. Louis by two games in the National League Central division with five games to go. As a result, the three clubs qualify for the playoffs and will at least be wild card game participants.
  - Alex Ríos of the Texas Rangers hits for the cycle in four at-bats in a 12–0 victory over the Houston Astros at Rangers Ballpark. Rios etches his name in the Texas record books by completing his first career cycle and becomes just the seventh player in franchise history to accomplish the feat. It's also the fourth cycle recorded in club history on four at-bats.
- September 24 – Against the Washington Nationals at Busch Stadium, rookie Michael Wacha of the St. Louis Cardinals has a no-hitter broken up with two out in the ninth. Ryan Zimmerman chops a ground ball that bounces over Wacha's glove to shortstop Pete Kozma, who bare-hands it but throws wide to first, pulling Matt Adams off the base. Trevor Rosenthal relieves Wacha after the hit and retires Jayson Werth on a ground ball for the final out in a 2–0 Cardinal victory. The last two Cardinal no-hitters have been pitched by rookies: Bud Smith in 2001 and José Jiménez in 1999. The no-hitter would have been the first in St. Louis since the second of Cardinal Bob Forsch's two no-hitters at Busch Memorial Stadium almost a full 30 years earlier, on September 26, 1983. With Yu Darvish and Yusmeiro Petit having perfect game bids broken up on April 2 and September 6 respectively, this is the first season in which three no-hit bids were broken up with two out in the ninth since 1990. It is also the first month since September 1988 in which two no-hitters were broken up with two out in the ninth, Toronto Blue Jay Dave Stieb having the bids broken up in consecutive starts, on the 24th and 30th.
- September 25:
  - The Detroit Tigers clinch their third consecutive American League Central Division with a 1–0 victory over the host Minnesota Twins. Max Scherzer scatters two hits and strikes out 10 batters over seven scoreless innings to improve his major league-best record to 21–3, while Torii Hunter drives in the winning run with a single in the first inning. With this victory, Jim Leyland earns his 700th win as manager of the Tigers, becoming the third manager in Detroit history to reach at least 700 wins, joining Hall of Famers Sparky Anderson and Hugh Jennings.
  - The New York Yankees fail to claim one of the ten playoff berths when they are mathematically eliminated before the final of an 8–3 loss to the Tampa Bay Rays at Yankee Stadium. The Yankees are trailing 7–3 in the eighth inning when they drop out of playoff contention as the Cleveland Indians complete a 7–2 victory against the Chicago White Sox. Despite having the highest opening-day payroll at $230 million, the Yankees are hindered by age, an assortment of injuries and subpar performances, failing to make the postseason for the first time since 2008 and for only the second time in 19 years.
  - Will Middlebrooks powers the attack with seven RBI and two home runs, including a grand slam, as the Boston Red Sox crush the Colorado Rockies, 15–5, in the final game of Colorado Rockies' first baseman Todd Helton at Coors Field. The seven RBI are a career high for Middlebrooks, while the slam is his second this season and third of his career. Helton, who announced his retirement two weeks before, is the longest-tenured and arguably greatest player in Colorado history. He goes 2 for 3, including one homer, a double and three RBI. At the time of his retirement, he leads the Rockies in several statistical categories after playing for them during 17 seasons.
- September 27:
  - The government of Cuba announces that it is lifting many of the restrictions placed on the ability of its athletes, including its baseball players, to sign contracts with teams abroad. Cuban baseball players will be allowed to sign with clubs in foreign countries as long as they also fulfill commitments to play domestically. While this represents a significant change in policy, it is unlikely to immediately impact player availability to Major League Baseball.
  - The hapless Houston Astros set a franchise record reaching 109 losses this season. After their 3–2 loss to the New York Yankees, they set another franchise record for futility, losing their 13th consecutive game. The Astros have not won a game since a 9–7 victory over the Los Angeles Angels of Anaheim on September 13. Two of these losses were in extra innings, and one came in a rain-shortened seven-inning game.
- September 28:
  - The Pittsburgh Pirates belt six home runs to beat the Cincinnati Reds, 8–3 at Great American Ball Park, and clinch home-field advantage in the wild-card playoff game. Neil Walker hits two of the Pirates homers, while Andrew McCutchen, Pedro Alvarez, Marlon Byrd and prospect Andrew Lambo each hit one. It is the first time the Pirates have six homers in a game since August 22, 2007, at Coors Field. Pittsburgh will host the Reds in the Pirates' first playoff appearance in 21 years. Pittsburgh posted a 50–31 record at PNC Park, the third-best home record in the National League, and want to make that long-awaited playoff return on their home turf.
  - The St. Louis Cardinals clinch their first National League Central Division title in four seasons with a 7–0 victory over the visiting Chicago Cubs. With this victory, the Cardinals are assured of home-field advantage when the NL Division Series starts.
  - Andy Pettitte closes out his 18-season career with a one more vintage performance, pitching his first complete game in more than seven years to lead the New York Yankees to a 2–1 win over the Houston Astros at Minute Maid Park. The left-handed Pettitte, 41, allows one earned run on five hits and two walks while striking out five, to outduel Astros rookie starter Paul Clemens, who was making only his fifth start and carries a shutout into the sixth inning before a cut on his right hand becomes an issue. A three-time All-Star and a member of five Yankees World Champion teams, Pettitte posted a 256–153 career record and a 3.86 ERA in 3,316 innings of work, ending his career without a losing season.
- September 29:
  - On the final day of the regular season, Henderson Álvarez of the Miami Marlins no-hits the Detroit Tigers over nine innings at Marlins Park. The no-hitter does not become official until the Marlins walk off with a 1–0 victory in the bottom of the ninth inning as Giancarlo Stanton scores from third on a wild pitch with Álvarez in the on-deck circle. The no-hitter is the third to be pitched on the final day of a regular season, joining the combined no-hitter by Vida Blue, Glenn Abbott, Paul Lindblad and Rollie Fingers in 1975 and Mike Witt's perfect game in 1984. Álvarez joined Al Leiter (1996), Kevin Brown (1997), A. J. Burnett (2001) and Aníbal Sánchez (2006) in the franchise's no-hitter club.
  - The Cleveland Indians claim the first American League wild card spot by beating the Minnesota Twins, 5–1. Cleveland wins 10 straight and 15 of its final 17 games to reach the postseason for the first time since 2007. The Tampa Bay Rays and Texas Rangers finish tied for the second American League wild card spot, and they will square off in a tiebreaker at the Ballpark in Arlington, each club vying to be the final piece of the playoff puzzle. Previously, Tampa Bay beats the Los Angeles Angels of Anaheim 6–2 for their seventh win in a row, while Texas defeats the Toronto Blue Jays 7–6.
- September 30:
  - Josh Donaldson of the Oakland Athletics and Hunter Pence of the San Francisco Giants are named Player of the Month in the American League and National League respectively. The third baseman earns his first such honor after batting .337 with eight doubles, five home runs and 16 RBI in 25 games to help the Athletics win the AL West Division title. Donaldson had 11 multi-hit efforts, while his 17 extra-base hits ranked him seventh in the AL, ending the season with 56 multi-hit games, the third-most in Oakland history behind Mark Kotsay (57 in 2004) and Miguel Tejada (57 in 2002). In 27 games, Pence batted .293 with a .393 on-base percentage and an MLB-leading .667 slugging percentage, also leading MLB with 32 RBI while tying for the lead with 11 home runs. Pence, who started all 162 games this season, became the first Giants player to do so since Alvin Dark in 1954, when the season was 154 games long. The right fielder finished the season in his NL-leading 171st consecutive game overall, hitting a walk-off single to give San Francisco a 7–6 victory against the San Diego Padres at AT&T Park. After that, Pence was rewarded with a five-year, $90 million contract by the Giants.
  - Ubaldo Jiménez of the Cleveland Indians and Kris Medlen of the Atlanta Braves earn Pitcher of the Month honors in their respective leagues. Jiménez, who wins his third distinction, posted a perfect 4–0 mark with a 1.09 ERA in six starts, striking out 51 and walking only seven in 41 1/3 innings of work. He finished first among AL hurlers in innings and strikeouts, second in ERA and ranks fourth in the league with 11.1 strikeouts per nine innings, while opposing batters hit only .230 against him. On the final day of the regular season, the Dominican pitcher tossed 6 2/3 shutout innings with a season-best 13 strikeouts against the Minnesota Twins to ensure the Indians a spot in the AL Wild Card Game. Medlen, who previously claimed the honor in August and September 2012, went 4–0 in five starts to tie for the NL lead in wins and posted a league-best 1.00 ERA over 36 innings. He also tied for first with the Los Angeles Dodgers' Zack Greinke with a 0.92 WHIP and ranked sixth limiting opponents to a .197 batting average, while striking out 33 against eight walks. Medlen finished the season with a 3.11 ERA and set career highs in innings (197), wins (15) and strikeouts (157), while helping the Braves finish off their first NL East title since 2005 and claim home-field advantage in the NL Division Series against the Dodgers.
  - Wil Myers of the Tampa Bay Rays is voted American League Rookie of the Month. In September, Myers hit a slash line (BA/OBP/SLG) of .317/.360/.558, including 13 doubles and four home runs in 27 games to help the Rays advance to the AL Wild Card tiebreaker against the Texas Rangers. The 22-year-old outfielder finished first among AL rookies in hits (33), runs (18), doubles, extra-base hits (17) and total bases (58), while tying for first in homers (13). He also ranked second in RBI (53), average (.293), OBP (.354) and SLG (.478). He put together an eight-game hitting streak from September 11–18, during which he batted .387 with five doubles, two homers and seven RBI, and notched his second career multi-homer game. The National League Rookie of the Month award is presented to Gerrit Cole, whose strong finish helps the Pittsburgh Pirates into their first playoff berth since the 1992 season. The 23-year-old pitcher goes 4–0 in five September starts to tie for the league lead in wins, and also leads qualifying rookie pitchers with a 1.69 ERA, 39 strikeouts and 32 innings, while issuing only 10 walks and finishing second with a .212 opponents' batting average. Cole finishes his rookie season with a 10–7 record, 100 strikeouts, and a 3.22 ERA in 117 1/3 innings of work.
  - David Price pitches a seven-hit complete game and Evan Longoria contributes with three hits and two RBI, including one home run and a double, leading the Tampa Bay Rays to a 5–2 win over the Texas Rangers, in the American League tiebreaker game at Rangers Ballpark. With the victory, Tampa Bay secures the second wild card spot and will visit the Cleveland Indians in order to meet the Boston Red Sox in the American League Division Series.

=== October ===
- October 1 – The Pittsburgh Pirates defeat Johnny Cueto and the Cincinnati Reds at PNC Park, 6–2, advancing to the playoffs for the first time in 21 years. Marlon Byrd, acquired by Pittsburgh in late August from the New York Mets, hits a home run in his first postseason at-bat of his 12-year career to put his team ahead, 1–0, in the second inning. Russell Martin homers twice and Francisco Liriano scatters four hits in seven innings, while Andrew McCutchen has two hits and reaches base four times.
- October 2 – Alex Cobb pitches 6 2/3 scoreless innings in his first career postseason start, and the Tampa Bay Rays move on to the American League Division Series after beating the Cleveland Indians, 4–0, at Progressive Field. Over the course of four days, Tampa Bay had to win three consecutive games on the road at Toronto, Texas and Cleveland in order to avoid playoff elimination. Delmon Young hits his ninth postseason home run and Desmond Jennings adds a two-run RBI double, while three relievers combine for 2 1/3 innings to complete the second postseason shutout in Tampa Bay franchise history. The Rays' other shutout was in Game 1 of the 2011 American League Division Series against the Texas Rangers.
- October 7 – The Los Angeles Dodgers take a 4–3 victory over the Atlanta Braves in Game 4 of the National League Division Series, and are propelled into the National League Championship Series for the first time since 2009.
- October 8 – The Boston Red Sox defeat the Tampa Bay Rays 3–1 in Game 4 of the American League Division Series, to advance to the American League Championship Series for the first time in five years.
- October 9 – The St. Louis Cardinals overcome the Pittsburgh Pirates in Game 5 of the National League Division Series, 6–1, and head back to the National League Championship Series for the third straight year.
- October 10 – The Detroit Tigers take charge of the Oakland Athletics in Game 5 of the American League Division Series, 3–0, advancing to the American League Championship Series for the third consecutive season.
- October 13 – Down 5–1 late in the game, David Ortiz hits a game-tying grand slam and the game results in a walk-off win for the Boston Red Sox to tie the ALCS 1–1.
- October 18 – The St. Louis Cardinals score four times in the third and add five more runs in a disastrous fifth inning, en route to a 9–0 annihilation of the Los Angeles Dodgers and their ace Clayton Kershaw in Game 6 of the National League Championship Series. The Cardinals, who fell one win shy a year ago, advance to the World Series for the second time in three years and the fourth time in the past decade. Michael Wacha (22), in his 12th big league start, beats Kershaw for the second time this series, allowing just two hits in seven scoreless innings and winning Most Valuable Player honors. Setup man Carlos Martínez (22) pitches a 1-2-3 eighth inning, while closer Trevor Rosenthal (23) retires the side in order in the ninth. All three Cardinals pitchers are rookies.
- October 19 – The Boston Red Sox take a definitive 5–2 lead over the Detroit Tigers in the bottom of the seventh inning on a Shane Victorino grand slam, to win Game 6 of the American League Championship Series and advance to the World Series for the third time in the last 10 years. Koji Uehara, who inherits the closer job after the team's first two choices were injured, delivers the last three outs and is named Most Valuable Player after posting three saves and a win in the series.
- October 29 – Cuban defector José Abreu agrees to a six-year, $68 million contract to play for the Chicago White Sox. It is the largest deal ever handed out by an international free agent in Major League history, besting the six-year, $60 million contract the Texas Rangers gave Yu Darvish on January 20, 2012.
- World Series
- October 30 – The Boston Red Sox defeat the St. Louis Cardinals 6–1 at Fenway Park and win their eighth World Series title and third in the last 10 seasons, to become the first team to win three world championship titles in the 21st century. Red Sox icon David Ortiz earns MVP honors. Ortiz becomes the first player since Baltimore Orioles pitcher Jim Palmer in the 1983 World Series to win three World Series rings with the same team and to have never played for the Yankees in his career. The last time Boston clinched the World Series at Fenway Park was in 1918, a 2–1 victory over the Chicago Cubs in Game 6. The Red Sox also joined the 1991 Minnesota Twins as the only teams to win a World Series following a last-place finish in the previous season.

=== November ===
- November 3 – The Tohoku Rakuten Golden Eagles clinch their first Japan Series championship title in their nine-year history, blanking the defending champion Yomiuri Giants, 3–0, in a decisive Game 7. The Giants are the oldest and most successful team in Japanese baseball with 22 championships, and the Eagles win the title in their first trip to the championship series, providing a dramatic lift to an area still recovering from the devastating earthquake and tsunami in March 2011.
- November 13 – Max Scherzer of the Detroit Tigers and Clayton Kershaw of the Los Angeles Dodgers are named Cy Young Award winners of the American and National League respectively. Scherzer, Major League Baseball's only 20-game winner at 21–3, receives 28 of 30 first-place votes. Yu Darvish of the Texas Rangers finishes second, the highest finish by a Japanese-born pitcher; the previous high had been fourth, by Hideo Nomo (National League) in 1995 and 1996 and Daisuke Matsuzaka (American League) in 2008. Kershaw, who also won the National League Cy Young Award in 2011 and finished second to R. A. Dickey in 2012, receives 29 of 30 first place votes, with Adam Wainwright of the St. Louis Cardinals receiving the final first-place vote.
- November 14 – Major League Baseball takes the first vote in a two-step process, unanimously approving funding for expanded instant replay in the 2014 MLB season. They plan to approve the new rules when they meet on January 16 in Paradise Valley, Arizona, after agreements with the unions for umpires and players. The instant replay was first used by the NFL in 1986, the NHL in 1991, the NBA in 2002 and Wimbledon in 2006. Even the Little League World Series put replay in place for 2008. MLB allowed it starting August 2008 but in a limited manner, only to determine whether potential home runs were fair or cleared fences.

=== December ===
- December 4 – Joe Garagiola is named as the 2014 recipient of the Buck O'Neil Lifetime Achievement Award, presented every three years by the Hall of Fame "for extraordinary efforts to enhance baseball's positive impact on society". He will receive the award on July 26, 2014, at the Hall of Fame Awards Presentation, the day before induction ceremonies. Garagiola, a former player and broadcaster who received the Hall's Ford C. Frick Award in 1991, was specifically cited for his role as a founder of two organizations—the Baseball Assistance Team, a charity which aids needy members of the professional baseball community, and the National Spit Tobacco Education Program, which advocates against the use of smokeless tobacco.
- December 9 – Managers Joe Torre, Tony La Russa and Bobby Cox are elected to the Hall of Fame, and will be inducted on July 27, 2014. The three managers, who won a combined 7,558 wins and eight World Series, are all unanimously selected by the 16 voters on the Expansion Era Committee. Torre won 2,326 games and four World Series (1996, 1998, 1999 and 2000) with the New York Yankees; La Russa won 2,728 games and three World Series, in 1989 with the Oakland Athletics and in 2006 and 2011 with the St. Louis Cardinals; Cox won 2,504 games and led the Atlanta Braves to 14 consecutive division titles and the 1995 World Series title.
- December 10 – Roger Angell, senior editor for The New Yorker, is announced as the 2014 recipient of the J. G. Taylor Spink Award, awarded by the Baseball Writers' Association of America (BBWAA) "for meritorious contributions to baseball writing." He will also receive his award at the Awards Presentation. Angell, who has written on the sport for more than 50 years, has published multiple best-selling books that included many of his New Yorker pieces. He is also the first recipient of the Spink Award to have never been a BBWAA member.
- December 11 – Eric Nadel, radio announcer for the Texas Rangers since 1979. is named as the 2014 recipient of the Ford C. Frick Award, presented by the Hall of Fame for broadcasting excellence. He will also receive his award at the Awards Presentation.
- December 15 – Researchers at the Boston University School of Medicine determine that Ryan Freel, at the time of his death, had stage two chronic traumatic encephalopathy; a progressive degenerative disease better known as CTE. Freel was found dead at his Jacksonville, Florida home as a result of a self-inflicted gunshot wound on December 22, 2012. He is reported as the first Major League Baseball player diagnosed with CTE.
- December 16 – Major League Baseball and Nippon Professional Baseball announce major changes to the posting system under which NPB teams can offer players currently under contract and not yet eligible for free agency to MLB teams. The most significant changes are:
  - Instead of posting fees set by a blind bidding process among MLB teams, fees will be set by NPB teams, with a cap of US$20 million.
  - Once posted, a player can negotiate with any MLB team willing to pay the fee during a 30-day window. Previously, a player could only negotiate with the team that submitted the highest posting fee. As in the previous scheme, the fee is paid only if an MLB team ultimately signs the player.
- December 22 – Alex Cabrera of the Tiburones de La Guaira blasted a historic home run in the Venezuelan League, breaking the league's 33-year-old record for the most home runs in a season set by Leones del Caracas' catcher Bo Díaz. Cabrera hit his 21st homer of the season in his 57th game, a grand slam off pitcher Daryl Thompson, in a 4–3 victory over the Caribes de Anzoátegui. With four games left on La Guaira's regular-season schedule, Cabrera is on pace to become the first Triple Crown winner in the 67-year history of the league. At this point, he is leading the circuit in homers with a .396 batting average and 58 RBI.

== Movies ==
- Home Run

== Deaths ==
=== January ===
- January 1 – Satchel Davis, 94, Negro league pitcher who played in the 1940s for the Baltimore Elite Giants and Cleveland Buckeyes, also a World War II veteran
- January 2 – Lee Eilbracht, 88, baseball coach at University of Illinois and a Chicago Cubs minor league player, who won four Big Ten titles during his coaching career, served as an analyst on baseball broadcasts, and was hired as an adviser for the 1992 film A League of Their Own.
- January 5 – Joe Padilla, 48, National League umpire during the 1995 season.
- January 6 – Cho Sung-min, 39, South Korean All-Star pitcher for Japan's Yomiuri Giants.
- January 7 – Jim Cosman, 69, pitcher for the St. Louis Cardinals and Chicago Cubs in parts of three seasons between 1966 and 1970.
- January 7 – Al Kenders, 75, catcher for the 1961 Philadelphia Phillies.
- January 11 – Fred Talbot, 71, pitcher who played from 1963 through 1970 for the Chicago White Sox, Kansas City and Oakland Athletics, New York Yankees and Seattle Pilots.
- January 12 – Bubba Harris, 86, pitcher who played for the Philadelphia Athletics and Cleveland Indians in part of three seasons spanning 1948–1951.
- January 13 – Enzo Hernández, 63, Venezuelan shortstop who played from 1971 through 1978 for the San Diego Padres and Los Angeles Dodgers.
- January 15 – Bill Glynn, 87, first baseman who played for the Philadelphia Phillies and Cleveland Indians in part of five seasons spanning 1949–54.
- January 19 – Milt Bolling, 82, shortstop who spent seven seasons in the majors from 1952 to 1958, and afterwards worked for the Boston Red Sox organization during 30 years.
- January 19 – Stan Musial, 92, one of the best hitters in Major League history and a Hall of Fame outfielder/first baseman, who spent a 22-year career with the St. Louis Cardinals spanning 1941–1963, one of the players from the MLB All-century team, taking seven National League batting titles and three MVP awards, while helping the Cardinals capture four NL Pennants and three World Series titles in the 1940s.
- January 19 – Earl Weaver, 82, Hall of Fame manager who won 1,480 games as Baltimore Orioles skipper, while leading the team to the World Series four times over 17 seasons, winning the Series championship title in 1970.
- January 20 – Ron Fraser, 79, College Baseball Hall of Fame coach, who posted a 1,271–438–9 record for the Miami Hurricanes from 1963 through 1992, including two CWS tiles in 1982 and 1985.
- January 23 – Ed Bouchee, 79, first baseman who played with the Philadelphia Phillies from 1956 to 1960 and the Chicago Cubs in 1960 and 1961 before joining the New York Mets in 1962.
- January 24 – Harry Taylor, 77, relief pitcher for the 1957 Kansas City Athletics.
- January 27 – Chuck Hinton, 78, All-Star outfielder who played between 1961 and 1968 for the Washington Senators, Cleveland Indians and California Angels.
- January 27 – Barney Mussill, 93, relief pitcher for the 1944 Philadelphia Phillies.
- January 28 – Lonnie Goldstein, 94, first baseman who played with the Cincinnati Reds in parts of the 1943 and 1946 seasons.
- January 28 – Earl Williams, 64, 1971 National League Rookie of the Year, and catcher from 1970 to 1977 for the Atlanta Braves, Baltimore Orioles, Montreal Expos and Oakland Athletics.
- January 30 – George Witt, 79, pitcher for the Pittsburgh Pirates, Los Angeles Angels and Houston Colt .45's from 1957 to 1962.
- January 31 – Tony Pierce, 67, pitcher for the Kansas City/Oakland Athletics in 1967 and 1968.
- January 31 – Fred Whitfield, 75, first baseman who played from 1962 through 1970 for the St. Louis Cardinals, Cleveland Indians, Cincinnati Reds and Montreal Expos.

=== February ===
- February 2 – Lavonne Paire Davis, 88, All-Star catcher who set several batting and fielding records during her 11-year career in the All-American Girls Professional Baseball League, as well as an inspiration for the central character in the 1992 film A League of Their Own.
- February 2 – Edith Houghton, 100, former baseball prodigy and first female scout in Major League history.
- February 3 – Steve Demeter, 78, infielder for the 1959 Detroit Tigers and the 1960 Cleveland Indians, who also was an eight-time minor league All-Star, managed a first-place team in the Carolina League, coached in the majors, and gained induction to the International League Hall of Fame.
- February 5 – Shelby Whitfield, 77, sports director for Associated Press Radio and ABC Radio, and play-by-play announcer for the Washington Senators from 1969 to 1970.
- February 10 – Jake Thies, 86, pitcher for the Pittsburgh Pirates during the 1954–1955 seasons.
- February 17 – Sophie Kurys, 87, All-American Girls Professional Baseball League MVP and four-time All-Star, a speedy infielder who set several all-time records, including 1,114 career stolen bases and five steals in a single game.
- February 20 – Neil Wilson, 77, catcher for the 1960 San Francisco Giants.
- February 22 – Mario Ramírez, 55, Puerto Rican infielder who played with the New York Mets and San Diego Padres from 1980 to 1985.
- February 26 – Mickey Stubblefield, 86, Negro League pitcher who in 1952 became the first African American to play in the Kentucky–Illinois–Tennessee League, being later drafted by the Pittsburgh Pirates after integration.
- February 28 – Pompeyo Davalillo, 84, Venezuelan infielder for the 1953 Washington Senators.
- February 28 – Moon Mullen, 96, second baseman who played for the Philadelphia Blue Jays during the 1944 season.

=== March ===
- March 2 – Tom Borland, 80, pitcher for the Boston Red Sox from 1960 to 1961, who also was named the CWS Most Outstanding Player in 1955 while pitching for Oklahoma A&M.
- March 7 – Ray Martin, 87, pitcher for the Boston Braves in parts of three seasons spanning 1943–1948.
- March 7 – Jake Striker, 79, pitcher who played from 1959 to 1960 with the Cleveland Indians and Chicago White Sox.
- March 7 – Carl Thomas, 80, pitcher for the 1960 Cleveland Indians.
- March 13 – Ducky Detweiler, 94, third baseman who played for the Boston Braves in the 1942 and 1946 seasons.
- March 14 – Jack Curran, 82, two-sport coach and member of nine different Halls of Fame, who won more basketball and baseball games (2,491) than any high school coach in United States history.
- March 16 – Yadier Pedroso, 26, pitcher for the Cuban national baseball team, who played in the 2006 and 2013 World Baseball Classic editions.
- March 18 – Earl Hersh, 80, reserve outfielder for the 1956 Milwaukee Braves.
- March 21 – Joe B. Scott, 92, Negro League outfielder who played from 1938 to 1956 for the New York Black Yankees, Pittsburgh Crawfords, Chicago American Giants and Memphis Red Sox.
- March 23 – Virgil Trucks, 95, two-time All-Star pitcher who helped the Detroit Tigers clinch the 1945 World Series title, and one of five pitchers to throw two no-hitters in a major league season.
- March 25 – Lou Sleater, 86, left-handed knuckleballer for six teams between 1950 and 1958, and also one of 10 pitchers to hit a walk-off home run since 1957.
- March 28 – Gus Triandos, 82, four-time All-Star catcher who played from 1953 through 1965 for five different teams, most prominently with the Baltimore Orioles.
- March 30 – Bob Turley, 82, three-time All-Star and Cy Young Award-winning pitcher, who lifted the New York Yankees, trailing 3 games to 1, to a come-from-behind victory over the Milwaukee Braves in the 1958 World Series.

=== April ===
- April 1 – Norm Gigon, 74, utility player for the 1967 Chicago Cubs.
- April 1 – Bob Smith, 82, pitcher for the Red Sox, Cardinals, Pirates and Tigers in part of four seasons spanning 1955–1959.
- April 11 – Grady Hatton, 90, third baseman for six teams in 12 seasons from 1946 to 1960, and later a manager for the Houston Astros from 1966 to 1968.
- April 12 – Takumi Otomo, 88, Japanese Baseball League and NPB pitcher for the Yomiuri Giants and Kintetsu Buffalo from 1949 to 1960.
- April 16 – Jack Daniels, 85, right fielder for the 1952 Boston Braves.
- April 25 – Rick Camp, 59, relief pitcher for the Atlanta Braves during nine seasons between 1976 and 1985.
- April 27 – Brad Lesley, 54, relief pitcher for the Cincinnati Reds and Milwaukee Brewers from 1982 to 1985, who in 1986 became the first American closer to pitch in Japan when he signed with the Hankyu Braves.

=== May ===
- May 3 – Joe Astroth, 90, backup catcher for the Philadelphia/Kansas City Athletics in a span of 10 seasons between 1945 and 1956, who also served during World War II.
- May 11 – Mike Davison, 67, pitcher for the San Francisco Giants in the 1969 and 1970 seasons.
- May 11 – Lenny Yochim, 84, screwball pitcher for the Pittsburgh Pirates in 1951 and 1954, who in 1955 became the first pitcher to throw a no-hitter in the Venezuelan Professional Baseball League while pitching for the Leones del Caracas club, a 3–0 shutout against Ramón Monzant and the Navegantes del Magallanes.
- May 12 – Johnny McKee, 98, college baseball catcher (Villanova University) who was bullpen coach of the 1947 Pittsburgh Pirates.
- May 15 – Fred White, 76, Kansas City Royals broadcaster over 25 years, who helped call six division championships, an American League pennant in 1980 and the Royals' World Series championship in 1985.
- May 16 – Frankie Librán, 65, Puerto Rican infielder who played briefly with the San Diego Padres during the 1969 season, who also excelled in Puerto Rican baseball, basketball, volleyball, track and field, and softball.
- May 18 – Neil Chrisley, 81, outfielder who played from 1957 to 1961 with the Washington Senators, Detroit Tigers and Milwaukee Braves.
- May 21 – Cot Deal, 90, pitcher for the Red Sox and Cardinals in part of four seasons spanning 1947–1954, who spent 48 years in baseball as a player (20), manager (5), coach (22) and executive (1).
- May 23 – Epy Guerrero, 71, Dominican MLB scout who worked for the Astros, Yankees, Blue Jays and Brewers organizations.
- May 23 – Luis Zuloaga, 90, legendary Venezuelan professional pitcher, who played in winter baseball, the Caribbean Series, and led the Venezuela national team to win the gold medal in two Baseball World Cup tournaments.
- May 24 – John Miles, 90, legendary Negro League slugger inducted into a number of Hall of Fames, who gained notoriety by hitting 11 home runs in an 11-game span.
- May 25 – Lewis Yocum, 65, orthopedic surgeon who achieved prestige by extending the careers of several Major League Baseball players.
- May 26 – Larry Johnson, 62, backup catcher who played with the Cleveland Indians, Montreal Expos and Chicago White Sox in parts of five seasons between 1972 and 1978.
- May 31 – Richie Phillips, 73, general counsel and executive director of the Major League Umpires Association from 1978 to 2000.

=== June ===
- June 6 – Elmer Guckert, 84, replacement umpire who worked one MLB game, at Pittsburgh on May 21, 1976, when unionized umpires refused to cross a picket line set up at Three Rivers Stadium by food-service workers.
- June 8 – José Sosa, 60, reliever for the Houston Astros from 1975 to 1976, who in 1975 became the first Dominican pitcher to hit a home run in his first major league at-bat.
- June 10 – Pete Vonachen, 87, longtime owner of the Peoria Chiefs minor league club.
- June 11 – Billy Williams, 80, outfielder for the 1969 Seattle Pilots expansion team.
- June 15 – Stan Lopata, 87, All-Star catcher for the Philadelphia Phillies, who holds single-season records for the most triples (7) and home runs (32) by a Phillies catcher, which he set in 1956.
- June 16 – Peggy Fenton, 85, infield/outfield utility who played in the All-American Girls Professional Baseball League during the 1948 season.
- June 18 – Gene Freese, 79, third baseman for six different teams during 12 seasons, who posted career numbers with 26 home runs and 87 RBIs in 1961, to help the Cincinnati Reds win their first National League pennant since 1940.
- June 19 – Danny Kravitz, 82, backup catcher who played from 1956 through 1960 for the Pittsburgh Pirates and the Kansas City Athletics.
- June 26 – Justin Miller, 35, pitcher who played with the Blue Jays, Marlins, Giants and Dodgers from 2002 to 2010, and for the NPB Chiba Lotte Marines in 2006.

=== July ===
- July 8 – Dick Gray, 81, third baseman for the Los Angeles Dodgers and St. Louis Cardinals from 1958 to 1960, who became the first Dodgers player to hit a home run after the club moved to Los Angeles for the 1958 season.
- July 14 – Matt Batts, 91, defensive specialist catcher who played from 1947 through 1956 for the Boston Red Sox, Detroit Tigers, St. Louis Browns, Chicago White Sox and Cincinnati Redlegs.
- July 16 – Marv Rotblatt, 85, pitcher for the Chicago White Sox in parts of three seasons spanning 1948–1951, who was also the inspiration for Carleton College's annual 100-inning, one-day, nine-hour marathon softball game they christened Rotblatt in the spring of 1967.
- July 26 – Bob Savage, 91, pitcher for the Philadelphia Athletics and St. Louis Browns in part of five seasons spanning 1942–1949.
- July 28 – Frank Castillo, 44, pitcher who spent seven seasons with the Chicago Cubs, and a member of the 2004 Boston Red Sox World Series Champions.
- July 28 – Drungo Hazewood, 53, backup outfielder who played briefly for the 1980 Baltimore Orioles.
- July 28 – George Scott, 69, a three-time All-Star first baseman and eight-time Gold Glove winner who played from 1966 through 1979 with four teams, most prominently for the Boston Red Sox, whose career included an American-League-leading 36 home runs and 109 RBIs in 1975 as a Milwaukee Brewer.

=== August ===
- August 1 – Babe Martin, 93, backup outfielder/catcher for the St. Louis Browns and Boston Red Sox in a span of six seasons between 1944 and 1953.
- August 6 – Mava Lee Thomas, 83, infielder/catcher who played for the Fort Wayne Daisies of the All-American Girls Professional Baseball League.
- August 9 – Harry Elliott, 89, backup outfielder for the St. Louis Cardinals in the 1953 and 1955 seasons.
- August 9 – Glen Hobbie, 77, pitcher for the Chicago Cubs from 1957 to 1964 and for the St. Louis Cardinals in 1964.
- August 9 – Johnny Logan, 86, four-time National League All-Star for the 1957 World Series Champion Milwaukee Braves, who also led the league in doubles in 1955 and helped them win the NL pennant in 1958.
- August 17 – Rod Craig, 55, backup outfielder who played with the Seattle Mariners, Cleveland Indians and Chicago White Sox in parts of four seasons spanning 1979–1986.
- August 17 – Jack Harshman, 96, pitcher for four teams between 1952 and 1960, mainly for the Chicago White Sox from 1954 to 1957, who holds the White Sox's single-game record by striking out 16 Boston Red Sox in 1954; hurled a 1–0, 16-inning shutout against the Detroit Tigers in the same season, and threw a one-hit, 1–0 shutout over the Baltimore Orioles in 1956.
- August 28 – Frank Pulli, 78, National League umpire from 1972 to 1999, who officiated in four World Series and two All-Star games, as well as 3,774 regular games along with other playoff series; also the first umpire in MLB history to use instant replay to reverse a home run call in 1999; also worked on the field for Roberto Clemente's 3,000th hit in 1972, and for Hank Aaron's record-breaking 715th home run in 1974.

=== September ===
- September 6 – Santiago Rosario, 74, Puerto Rican first baseman and corner outfielder who played for the Kansas City Athletics in the 1965 season.
- September 13 – Dan Osinski, 79, middle relief pitcher for the Kansas City Athletics, Milwaukee Braves, Boston Red Sox, Chicago White Sox and Houston Astros in parts of eight seasons spanning 1962–1970.
- September 19 – Hiroshi Yamauchi, 85, Japanese businessman and majority owner of the Seattle Mariners since 1992.
- September 20 – Walt Linden, 89, backup catcher for the 1950 Boston Braves.
- September 25 – Bill Stewart, 85, outfielder for the 1955 Kansas City Athletics.
- September 26 – Denis Brodeur, 82, iconic Canadian sports photographer and baseball author.
- September 27 – Gates Brown, 74, outfielder for the Detroit Tigers in 13 seasons from 1963 through 1975, who hit a home run in his first MLB at bat and also was part of two World Series championships, winning as a player in 1968 and a coach in 1984.

=== October ===
- October 1 – Ellis Burton, 77, center fielder who played with the St. Louis Cardinals, Cleveland Indians and Chicago Cubs in parts of five seasons spanning 1958–1965.
- October 1 – Tom Clancy, 66, best-selling novelist who was a minority owner of the Baltimore Orioles from 1993 until his death.
- October 3 – Bob Chance, 73, first baseman who played from 1963 to 1969 with the Cleveland Indians, Washington Senators and California Angels.
- October 8 – Andy Pafko, 92, five-time All-Star center fielder who posted a .285 average with 213 home runs and 976 RBIs in 17 seasons for the Chicago Cubs, Brooklyn Dodgers and Milwaukee Braves, while also appearing in 24 World Series games, including the Cubs' visit to the Series in 1945.
- October 13 – Mario Picone, 87, pitcher for the New York Giants and Cincinnati Redlegs in part of three seasons spanning 1947–1954.
- October 14 – Wally Bell, 48, veteran umpire during 21 Major League Baseball seasons who worked the 2006 World Series, three All-Star Games, four league championship series, and seven division series, as well as the first active MLB umpire to die since John McSherry died on the field on Opening Day in 1996.
- October 15 – Rudy Minarcin, 83, pitcher who appeared in 70 games from 1955 to 1957 for the Cincinnati Redlegs and Boston Red Sox, previously a two-sport star at Vandergrift High School, and also a Korean War veteran.
- October 22 – Mark Small, 45, relief pitcher for the Houston Astros during the 1996 season.
- October 27 – Eddie Erautt, 89, pitcher for the Cincinnati Reds and St. Louis Cardinals in a span of six seasons from 1947 to 1953.
- October 28 – Tetsuharu Kawakami, 93, Japanese player who won five batting titles, two home run crowns, three RBI titles and had six titles for the most hits in a season, while leading the Yomiuri Giants to nine consecutive championships from 1965 to 1973 as a manager.
- October 30 – Bill Currie, 84, relief pitcher for the 1955 Washington Senators.
- October 31 – Johnny Kucks, 80, pitcher for the New York Yankees and Kansas City Athletics from 1955 to 1960, who hurled a three-hit shutout in a 9–0 Yankees victory against the Brooklyn Dodgers in Game 7 of the 1956 World Series, in the last World Series game ever played at Ebbets Field.

=== November ===
- November 2 – Russ Sullivan, 90, outfielder for the Detroit Tigers from 1951 to 1953, whose mammoth home run into the third deck of Briggs Stadium's right field pavilion in 1952 helped Detroit pitcher Hal Newhouser win his 200th career game.
- November 6 – Ace Parker, 101, shortstop who played 94 games for the 1937–1938 Philadelphia Athletics; at his death, the second oldest surviving Major League player; star football player for Duke University and three NFL teams, and member of the Pro Football Hall of Fame.
- November 8 – Rod Miller, 73, pinch-hitter for the Brooklyn Dodgers in the 1957 season.
- November 17 – Zeke Bella, 83, backup outfielder who played for the New York Yankees in 1957 and the Kansas City Athletics in 1959.
- November 19 – Babe Birrer, 85, pitcher for the Detroit Tigers, Baltimore Orioles and Los Angeles Dodgers in a span of three seasons from 1955 to 1958, who also had a distinguished 18-year career in the Minor leagues, Canadian baseball and the Caribbean winter leagues.
- November 21 – Mike Palagyi, 96, relief pitcher for the 1939 Washington Senators.
- November 21 – Michael Weiner, 51, executive director of the Major League Baseball Players Association since 2009, who led the negotiations in 2011 for the then-current collective bargaining agreement, which ran through 2016.
- November 21 – George Werley, 75, relief pitcher for the 1956 Baltimore Orioles.
- November 23 – Al Forman, 85, National League umpire who worked in 778 games during a seven-year career, including the 1962 MLB All-Star Game.
- November 24 – Charlie Bicknell, 85, pitcher who played from 1948 to 1949 for the Philadelphia Phillies.
- November 25 – Lou Brissie, 89, a decorated World War II hero who overcame serious combat injuries to become an All-Star pitcher, while playing for the Philadelphia Athletics and the Cleveland Indians between the 1947 and 1953 seasons.

=== December ===
- December 10 – Don Lund, 90, outfielder for the Brooklyn Dodgers, St. Louis Browns and Detroit Tigers between 1945 and 1954, and also a University of Michigan three-sport athlete and Hall of Honor inductee.
- December 10 – Pete Naton, 82, backup catcher for the 1953 Pittsburgh Pirates.
- December 12 – Jim Burton, 64, Boston Red Sox relief pitcher who posted a 1–2 record with a 2.75 ERA and one save in the 1975 and 1977 seasons, who is better known for being the losing pitcher in Game 7 of the 1975 World Series.
- December 13 – Vivian Kellogg, 91, multi-sport athlete who played from 1944 through 1950 in the legendary All-American Girls Professional Baseball League.
- ESDecember 22 – Ed Herrmann, 67, All-Star catcher who played for five different teams in 11 seasons spanning 1967–1978, most prominently with the Chicago White Sox.
- December 22 – Bill Tremel, 84, relief pitcher who played from 1954 through 1956 for the Chicago Cubs.
- December 25 – Mike Hegan, 71, first baseman and outfielder with the New York Yankees, Seattle Pilots, Milwaukee Brewers & Oakland Athletics, and later a longtime broadcaster with the Brewers & Cleveland Indians. He was the son of longtime Indians catcher Jim Hegan.
- December 26 – Paul Blair, 69, All-Star and eight-time Gold Glove center fielder, who played for the Baltimore Orioles, New York Yankees and Cincinnati Reds in 17 seasons spanning 1964–1980, and also a member of four World Series champion teams.
