= Francisco Peña (baseball) =

Dominican baseball player (born 1989)

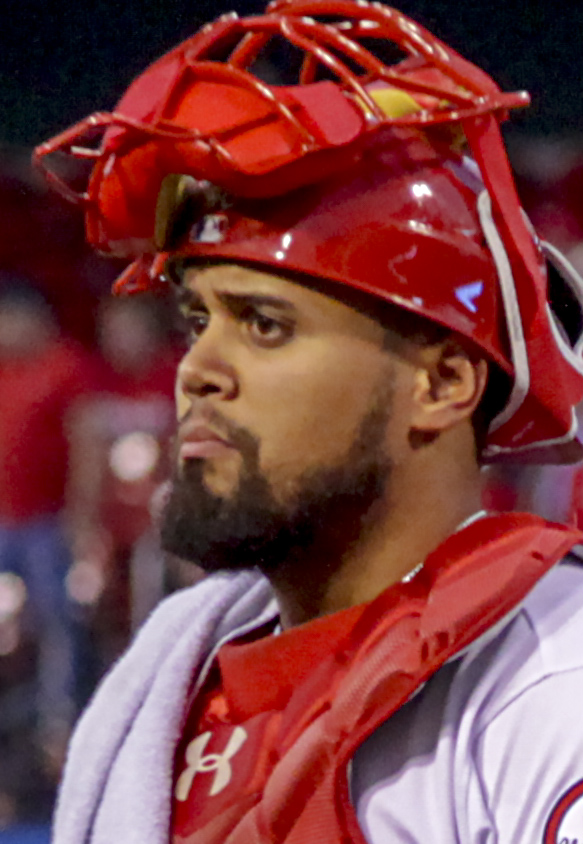
- Peña with the Cardinals in 2018

Piratas de Campeche – No. 41
- Catcher
- Born: October 12, 1989 (age 36); Santiago, Dominican Republic
- Bats: Right Throws: Right

Professional debut
- MLB: May 20, 2014, for the Kansas City Royals
- CPBL: April 3, 2022, for the CTBC Brothers

MLB statistics (through 2018 season)
- Batting average: .216
- Home runs: 5
- Runs batted in: 13

CPBL statistics (through 2023 season)
- Batting average: .241
- Home runs: 11
- Runs batted in: 50
- Stats at Baseball Reference

Teams
- Kansas City Royals (2014–2015); Baltimore Orioles (2016–2017); St. Louis Cardinals (2018); CTBC Brothers (2022–2023)

Career highlights and awards
- Taiwan Series champion (2022)
Medals
Men's baseball
Representing Dominican Republic
World Baseball Classic
Gold medal – first place	2013 San Francisco	Team

Francisco Antonio Peña (born October 12, 1989) is a Dominican-American professional baseball catcher for the Piratas de Campeche of the Mexican League. He has previously played in Major League Baseball (MLB) for the Kansas City Royals, Baltimore Orioles and St. Louis Cardinals. He has also played in the Chinese Professional Baseball League (CPBL) for the CTBC Brothers.

== Career ==
=== New York Mets ===
Peña signed with the New York Mets as an international free agent in 2007, receiving a $750,000 signing bonus. He made his professional debut with the Savannah Sand Gnats of the Single–A South Atlantic League (SAL), where in 103 games, he hit .210 with five home runs, and 30 runs batted in (RBI). Peña also spent the 2008 season with the Sand Gnats, where in 105 games, he hit .264 with six home runs, 41 RBI, and 22 doubles. He was named to the SAL All-Star Game as a backup catcher to Jesús Montero. Peña played 2009 with the St. Lucie Mets of the High–A Florida State League (FSL), where in 100 games, he hit .224 with eight home runs and 44 RBI. He was named to the FSL All-Star Game as a backup catcher for Austin Romine. He missed most of 2010 with a broken foot. He made his debut on August 14 in a 10-game rehab assignment in the Gulf Coast League, and on August 26, he returned to St. Lucie, appearing in 10 more games. Peña played 2011 with St. Lucie, where in 95 games, he hit .223 with five home runs and 37 RBI.

Peña began his fourth season with St. Lucie in 2012. In 41 games with St. Lucie, he hit .254 with four home runs and 22 RBIs. On June 21, he was promoted to the Binghamton Mets of the Double–A Eastern League, where in 40 games, he hit .198 with three home runs and 17 RBI. He also threw out a career-high 45% of would-be base stealers. Peña began 2013 with Binghamton, where he hit .246 in 21 games before earning a promotion to the Las Vegas 51s of the Triple–A Pacific Coast League on May 18. In 68 games with the 51s, he hit .257 with nine home runs and 39 RBI. After the season, he became a minor league free agent.

=== Kansas City Royals ===
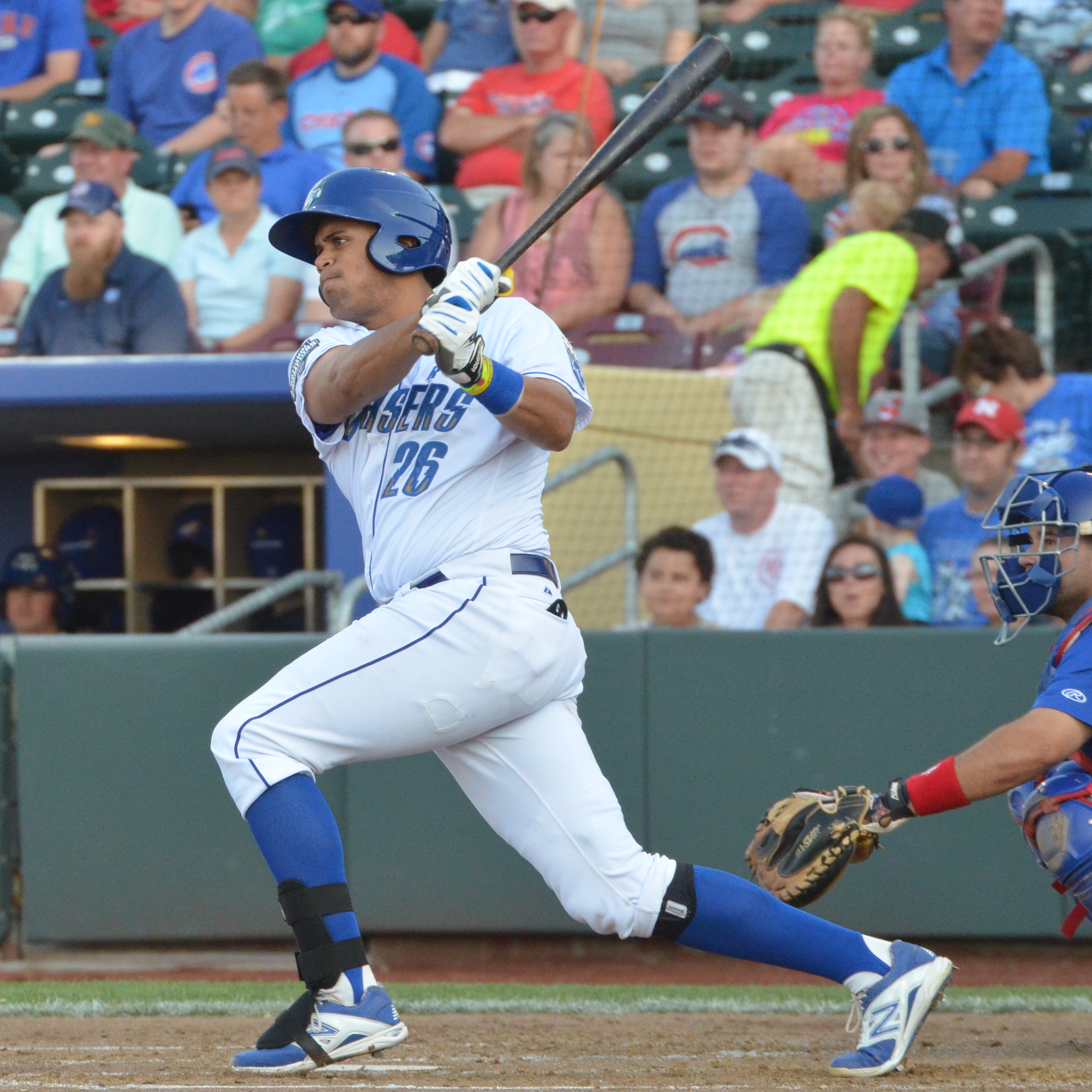
Peña batting for the Omaha Storm Chasers in 2014

On November 17, 2013, Peña signed with the Kansas City Royals, who added him to their 40-man roster. He competed for a role as a backup catcher to Salvador Pérez. He made his major league debut in May 2014, appearing in one game. He rejoined the Royals in September, but did not appear in a game. After starting the 2015 season in the minor leagues, the Royals promoted Peña to the major leagues on May 6, when Erik Kratz was placed on the disabled list. In 8 Major Leagues games, he had a .143 batting average. The Royals finished the year with a 95–67 record and eventually won the 2015 World Series, their first championship in 30 years. Peña did not play in any postseason games but was in the victory parade.

He was designated for assignment on December 2, 2015.

=== Baltimore Orioles ===
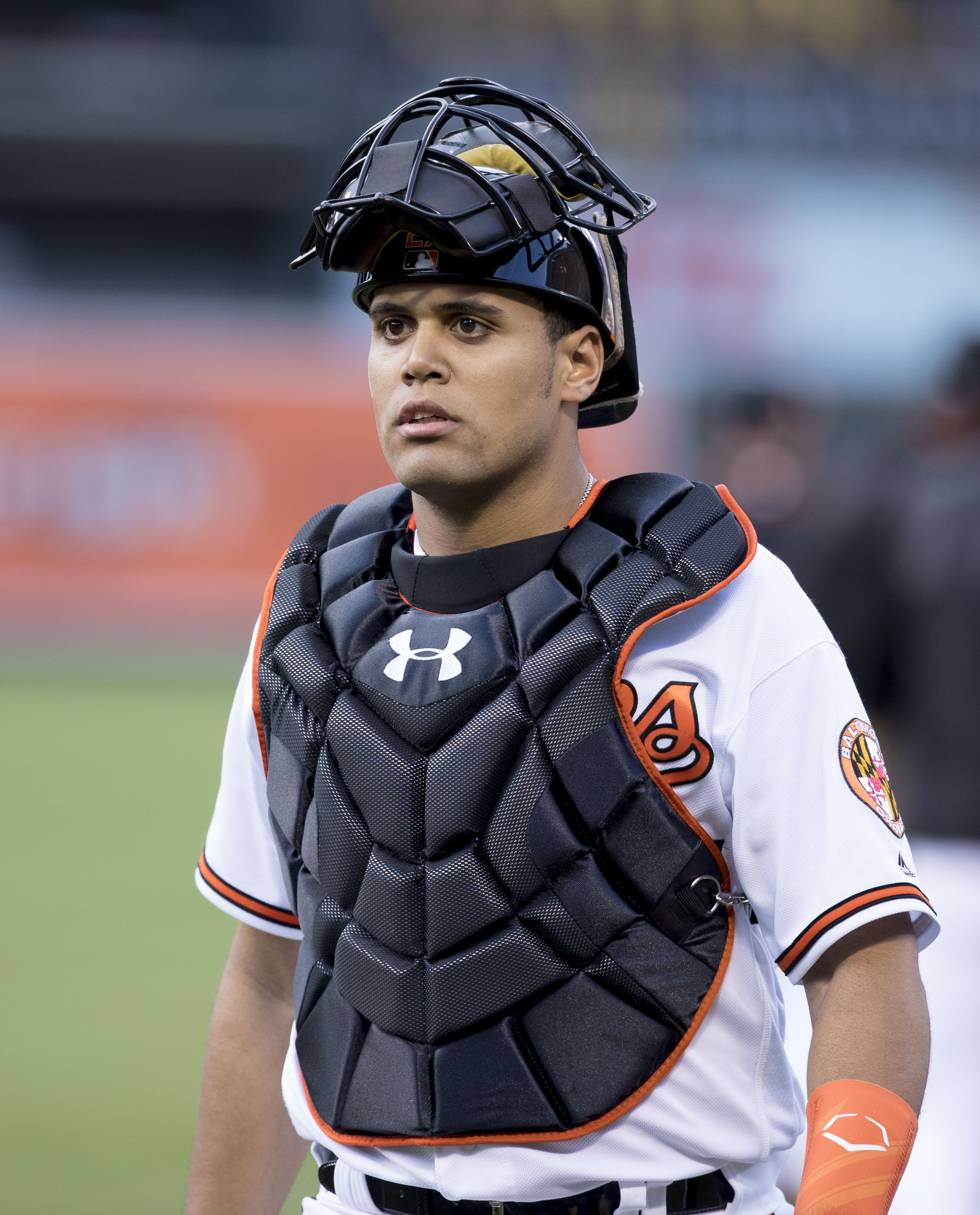
Pena with the Orioles in 2016

On the same day he was designated for assignment by the Royals, Peña was traded to the Baltimore Orioles in exchange for cash considerations. He played in 24 games for the Norfolk Tides of the Triple–A International League, before he was promoted to the major leagues on May 31, 2016, while Orioles backup catcher Caleb Joseph went on the disabled list. On June 2, Peña started and debuted for the Orioles. He went 2-for-4 with two RBI and hit his first major league home run to help the Orioles defeat the Boston Red Sox 12–7. Peña ended his 2016 season with a .200 batting average, one home run, and three RBI.

On February 10, 2017, Peña was designated for assignment by the Orioles. He cleared waivers and was sent outright to Triple–A Norfolk on February 15. On May 2, Peña had his contract selected from Triple–A Norfolk to replace the injured Welington Castillo. In 5 games for Baltimore, he went 5-for-10 (.500) with 2 home runs and 2 RBI. Peña was designated for assignment for on June 10. He cleared waivers and was sent outright to Norfolk on June 13. Peña elected free agency on October 3.

=== St. Louis Cardinals ===
On December 13, 2017, Pena signed a minor league contract with the St. Louis Cardinals. He made the active roster as the backup catcher, from a NRI in Spring Training, on March 23, 2018, as part of a four-man bench. In 58 games for St. Louis, Peña batted .203/.239/.271 with two home runs and eight RBI. On November 2, he was removed from the 40–man roster and sent outright to the Triple–A Memphis Redbirds. However, he subsequently elected free agency the same day.

On December 1, 2018, it was incorrectly reported that the Cardinals re–signed Peña to a minor league contract with an invitation to spring training. This was due to an error on the date of a story reporting the previous year contract.

=== San Francisco Giants ===
On May 2, 2019, Peña was traded to the San Francisco Giants in exchange for cash considerations. He was later activated for the organization's Triple–A affiliate, the Sacramento River Cats, who won the Pacific Coast League and went on to win the 2019 Triple–A National Championship, being the first time in minor league history a team won 3 titles. Fans and the media alike both considered Peña to be a key factor in the team's championship run, having led a large part of the team's offensive stats for a majority of the season. He elected free agency following the season on November 4.

=== Cincinnati Reds ===
On January 4, 2020, Peña signed a minor league deal with the Cincinnati Reds. Peña did not play in a game in 2020 due to the cancellation of the minor league season because of the COVID-19 pandemic. He became a free agent on November 2.

=== Oakland Athletics ===
On December 2, 2020, Peña signed a minor league contract with the Oakland Athletics organization. He spent the 2021 season with the Triple–A Las Vegas Aviators, playing in 105 games and hitting .250/.322/.459 with 23 home runs and 81 RBI.

=== CTBC Brothers ===
On January 12, 2022, Peña signed with the CTBC Brothers of the Chinese Professional Baseball League. In 71 games for the Brothers, he hit .255/.292/.340 with 5 home runs and 28 RBI. Following the season, he was named a Gold Glove and Best Ten Award winner.

In 2023, Peña played in 59 games for the Brothers, hitting .216/.278/.392 with 6 home runs and 22 RBI. On August 11, 2023, Peña was released by the Brothers due to the team's need for foreign starting pitchers but was still allowed to stay with the second team.

=== Piratas de Campeche ===
On February 1, 2024, Peña signed with the Piratas de Campeche of the Mexican League. In 75 games for the Piratas, he hit .301/.385/.390 with four home runs and 23 RBI.

Peña made 77 appearances for Campeche during the 2025 campaign, batting .295/.409/.567 with 19 home runs and 62 RBI.

== International career ==
Peña played in the 2013 Caribbean Series and played for the Dominican Republic national baseball team in the 2013 World Baseball Classic.

After the 2020 season, he played for Águilas Cibaeñas of the Dominican Professional Baseball League (LIDOM). He has also played for Dominican Republic in the 2021 Caribbean Series.

== Personal life ==
Peña is the son of Tony Peña and the brother of Tony Peña Jr.

Peña also played in the 2001 Little League World Series on the Bronx, New York team, where he was a teammate of the infamous Danny Almonte.

== See also ==
- List of second-generation Major League Baseball players
