= Ángel Castro (pitcher) =

Dominican baseball player (born 1982)

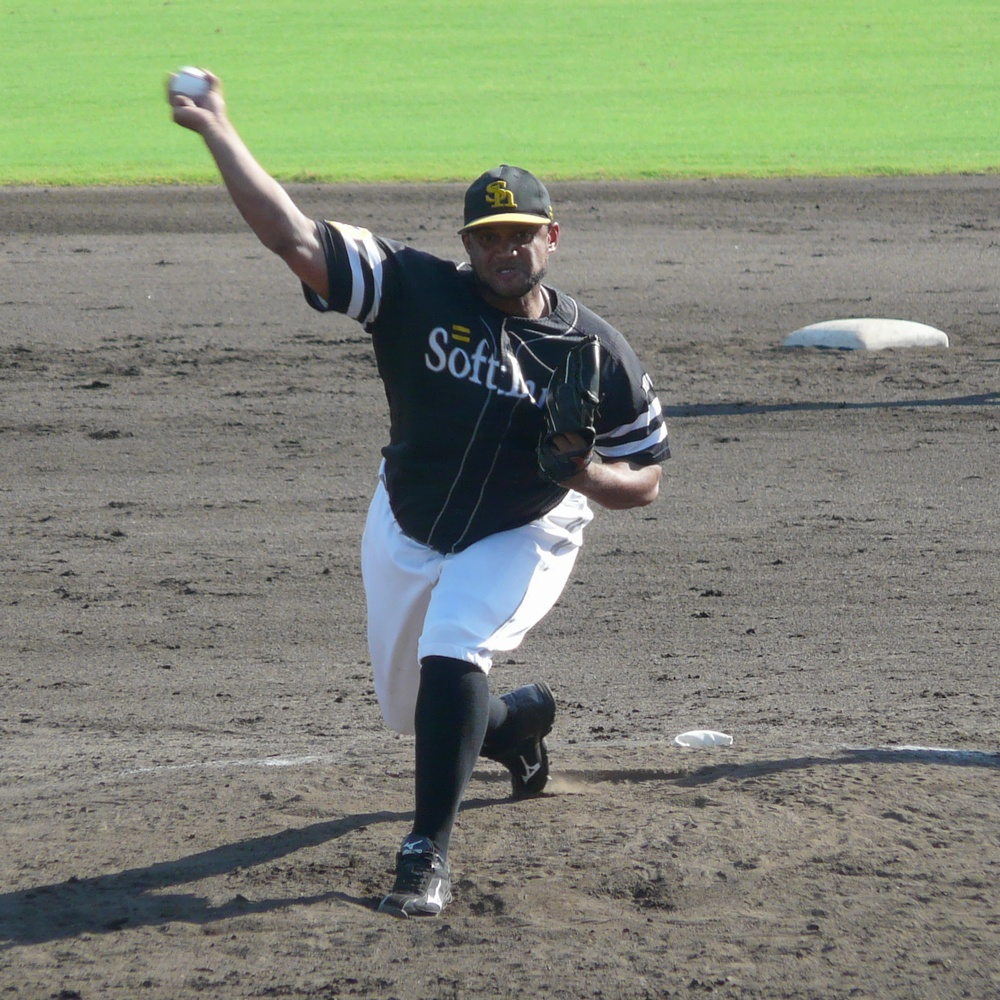
- Castro with the Fukuoka SoftBank Hawks
- Pitcher
- Born: November 14, 1982 (age 43); Pimentel, Dominican Republic
- Batted: Right Threw: Right

Professional debut
- NPB: May 25, 2012, for the Fukuoka SoftBank Hawks
- MLB: May 9, 2015, for the Oakland Athletics

Last appearance
- NPB: August 13, 2012, for the Fukuoka SoftBank Hawks
- MLB: July 24, 2015, for the Oakland Athletics

NPB statistics
- Win–loss record: 0–0
- Earned run average: 6.00
- Strikeouts: 2

MLB statistics
- Win–loss record: 0–1
- Earned run average: 2.25
- Strikeouts: 4
- Stats at Baseball Reference

Teams
- Fukuoka SoftBank Hawks (2012); Oakland Athletics (2015)
Medals
Men's baseball
Representing Dominican Republic
World Baseball Classic
Gold medal – first place	2013 San Francisco	Team

Ángel M. Castro (born November 14, 1982) is a Dominican former professional baseball pitcher. He has previously played in Major League Baseball (MLB) for the Oakland Athletics and in Nippon Professional Baseball (NPB) for the Fukuoka SoftBank Hawks.

== Career ==
=== Detroit Tigers ===
Castro attended Western Oklahoma State College in Altus, Oklahoma. The Detroit Tigers drafted Castro in the 13th round, with the 382nd overall selection, of the 2006 Major League Baseball draft. He made his professional debut with the Dominican Summer League Tigers.

Castro split the 2007 season between the Single–A West Michigan Whitecaps and High–A Lakeland Flying Tigers. In 27 games (25 starts) between the two affiliates, he accumulated an 11–6 record and 3.39 ERA with 78 strikeouts across 151 1/3 innings pitched.

Castro spent the 2008 campaign with Lakeland and the Double–A Erie SeaWolves. In 47 combined games out of the bullpen, he compiled a 3.08 ERA with 52 strikeouts and 7 saves across 79 innings of work.

=== Philadelphia Phillies ===
On June 2, 2009, Castro signed a minor league contract with the Philadelphia Phillies. In 14 games for the Double–A Reading Phillies, he recorded a 7.00 ERA with 10 strikeouts across 18 innings of work. Castro was released by the Phillies organization on July 31.

=== Tampa Bay Rays ===
On August 8, 2009, Castro signed a minor league contract with the Tampa Bay Rays. He spent the remainder of the year with the High–A Charlotte Stone Crabs and Double–A Montgomery Biscuits. Castro struggled with both affiliates, recording a 6.75 ERA in two games for Montgomery, and a 22.50 ERA in four games for Charlotte. He elected free agency following the season on November 9.

=== Lincoln Saltdogs ===
Castro signed with the Lincoln Saltdogs of the American Association of Independent Professional Baseball for the 2010 season. In 6 starts for Lincoln, he went 3–3 with a 3.16 ERA and 21 strikeouts across 31 1/3 innings pitched.

=== Dorados de Chihuahua ===
On June 20, 2010, Castro signed with the Dorados de Chihuahua of the Mexican League. In five starts with Chihuahua, Castro pitched to a 3–1 record and 4.70 ERA with 24 strikeouts across 30 2/3 innings of work.

=== Saraperos de Saltillo ===
On May 24, 2011, Castro signed with the Saraperos de Saltillo of the Mexican League. In 21 appearances for Saltillo, Castro logged a 5.45 ERA with 34 strikeouts and 4 saves across 39 2/3 innings.

=== Fukuoka SoftBank Hawks ===
Castro signed with the Fukuoka SoftBank Hawks of Nippon Professional Baseball for the 2012 season. He only made three appearances for the Hawks' main club, recording a 6.00 ERA with two strikeouts in three innings of work.

=== Los Angeles Dodgers ===
On December 7, 2012, Castro signed a minor league contract with the Los Angeles Dodgers. In 25 games (19 starts) for the Triple–A Albuquerque Isotopes, he registered an 8–5 record and 3.48 ERA with 91 strikeouts across 116 1/3 innings pitched. Castro elected free agency following the season on November 4, 2013.

=== St. Louis Cardinals ===
On December 11, 2013, Castro signed a one-year deal with the St. Louis Cardinals. On March 23, 2014, he was removed from the 40–man roster and sent outright to the Triple–A.Memphis Redbirds. Castro made 26 appearances (14 starts) for Memphis, logging a 9–6 record and 4.01 ERA with 63 strikeouts across 94 1/3 innings pitched.

=== Oakland Athletics ===
On August 8, 2014, Castro was traded to the Oakland Athletics organization for cash considerations. He spent the remainder of the year with the Triple–A Sacramento River Cats, posting a 7.78 ERA across 4 starts.

Castro began the 2015 season with the Triple-A Nashville Sounds. On May 8, 2015, Castro was selected to the 40-man roster and promoted to the major leagues for the first time. He would be optioned down to Nashville on June 2. In 5 appearances for Oakland during his rookie campaign, Castro recorded a 2.25 ERA with 4 strikeouts across 4 innings pitched. On September 1, he was removed from the 40–man roster and sent outright to Triple–A Nashville. Castro elected free agency after the season on October 5.

On November 4, 2015, Castro re–signed with Oakland on a minor league contract. He made 37 appearances (10 starts) for Nashville in 2016, registering a 2–8 record and 5.15 ERA with 58 strikeouts across 92 2/3 innings. Castro elected free agency following the season on November 7, 2016.

=== Sultanes de Monterrey ===
On March 30, 2017, Castro signed with the Sultanes de Monterrey of the Mexican League. In 22 starts for Monterey, he compiled an 11–6 record and 4.28 ERA with 96 strikeouts across 138 2/3 innings of work. Castro was released by the Sultanes on January 12, 2018.

=== Bravos de Leon ===
On March 4, 2018, Castro signed with the Bravos de León of the Mexican Baseball League. In 7 games (5 starts) for León, Castro recorded a 4.44 ERA with 11 strikeouts across 26 1/3 innings pitched.

=== Guerreros de Oaxaca ===
On June 27, 2018, Castro was traded to the Guerreros de Oaxaca of the Mexican League. In 7 starts for Oaxaca, he struggled to a 5.66 ERA with 30 strikeouts in 35 innings. Castro was released by the organization on August 9.

=== Toronto Maple Leafs ===
On June 26, 2022, after three years of inactivity, Castro signed with the Toronto Maple Leafs of the Intercounty Baseball League. In 9 starts for the club, he posted a 3–4 record and 5.98 ERA with 45 strikeouts across 52 2/3 innings of work.

On April 21, 2024, Castro re–signed with the Maple Leafs after spending the 2023 season out of baseball. In 11 starts for Toronto, he struggled to a 2-6 record and 6.03 ERA with 71 strikeouts across 62 2/3 innings pitched. Castro was released by the Maple Leafs on May 7.

== International career ==
Castro played for the Dominican Republic national baseball team in the 2011 Baseball World Cup and the 2013 World Baseball Classic.
