= Joe Padilla =

American baseball umpire (1964–2013)

Padilla

Joe G. Padilla (March 22, 1964 – January 5, 2013) was an American Major League Baseball (MLB) umpire for a brief time in 1995.

== Early life ==
Padilla was born in Silver City, New Mexico on March 22, 1964. His parents were Joe and Patsy Padilla; he died before them.

== Umpiring career ==
He attended umpiring school in Florida and later umpired at the collegiate level in the states of Arizona and New Mexico. Padilla also umpired in the Alaska Baseball League for one season.

During the 1995 major league umpire strike, he was called upon to umpire during spring training and he was also asked to be part of a National League umpire crew to start the 1995 regular season. On April 26, 1995, Padilla umpired his first MLB game as the Colorado Rockies defeated the New York Mets by an 11–9 score. Fellow umpires Mike Riggins and Dick Jackson also made their Major League debuts in that game. Padilla's crew officiated the inaugural series played by the Rockies in their new stadium, Coors Field.

Padilla umpired a total of seven major league games, his last coming on May 2, 1995. In that game, the Pittsburgh Pirates beat the St. Louis Cardinals 7–6 and Padilla served as the home plate umpire.

== Personal life ==
Padilla graduated from the high school in 1982. He was employed by a pair of food companies and later went into business, operating Acme Grill Cleaning, which was located in Phoenix, Arizona. Retrosheet lists his full name as Joe G. Padilla. He died in Mesa, Arizona on January 5, 2013, at the age of 48. Padilla's obituary did not state the circumstances surrounding his death or how he died.
