= Mario Lisson =

Venezuelan baseball player (born 1984)

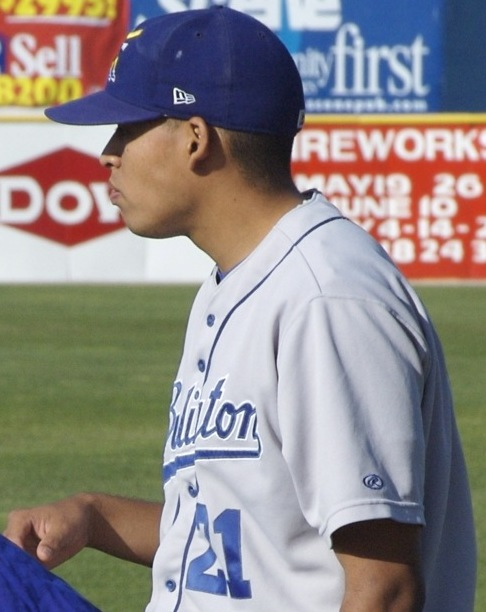
- Lisson with the Burlington Bees in 2006
- Infielder
- Born: May 31, 1984 (age 41); Caracas, Venezuela
- Bats: Right Throws: Right
- Stats at Baseball Reference

Mario Lisson Ortega (born May 31, 1984) is a Venezuelan former professional baseball shortstop. He was signed as an undrafted free agent by the Kansas City Royals in 2002.

== Professional career ==
=== Kansas City Royals ===
On April 1, 2002, Lisson signed with the Kansas City Royals organization as an international free agent. He made his professional debut with the rookie ball GCL Royals. Lisson did not play in 2003 and spent the 2004 season with the rookie ball Idaho Falls Chukars, slashing .289/.398/.438 with 8 home runs and 49 RBI. In 2005, he played for the Single-A Burlington Bees, batting .250/.386/.408 in 78 games. He remained in Burlington for the 2006 season, hitting .263/.368/.421 with 13 home runs and 73 RBI in 130 games. Lisson spent the next year with the High-A Wilmington Blue Rocks, batting .285/.348/.408 in 126 contests.

On November 20, 2007, Lisson was added to Kansas City's 40-man roster. He spent the 2008 season in Double-A with the Northwest Arkansas Naturals, slashing .225/.284/.374 with 14 home runs and 65 RBI. He split the 2009 season between the Triple-A Omaha Royals and Northwest Arkansas, hitting .227/.283/.373 between the two teams. On January 25, 2010, Lisson was designated for assignment by the Royals to clear room on the 40-man roster for Rick Ankiel. He did not play in a game in 2010 and re-signed with the Royals on November 18, 2010, on a new minor league contract. Lisson spent the 2011 season with Northwestern Arkansas, slashing .293/.372/.527 with 15 home runs and 45 RBI. He elected free agency after the season and again re-signed with Kansas City on November 10, on another minor league deal. He again played in Northwest Arkansas for the 2012 season, where he hit .247/.338/.410 in 116 games. On November 2, 2012, Lisson elected free agency.

=== Guerreros de Oaxaca ===
On March 20, 2013, Lisson signed with the Guerreros de Oaxaca of the Mexican League. In 36 games for Oaxaca, Lisson batted .264/.331/.493 with 8 home runs and 22 RBI.

=== Petroleros de Minatitlan ===
On May 13, 2013, Lisson was traded to the Petroleros de Minatitlan of the Mexican League. He hit .254/.361/.430 in 30 games before being released by the club on June 24, 2013.

On January 7, 2014, Lisson playing for the Magallanes tied a mark in the Venezuelan League with three home runs in a postseason game.

=== San Francisco Giants ===
On December 13, 2013, Lisson signed a minor league contract with the San Francisco Giants organization. He spent the year with the Double-A Richmond Flying Squirrels, where he was the team's regular third baseman On the year, he batted .266 with 18 home runs and 76 RBI.

=== Washington Nationals ===
On December 12, 2014, Lisson signed a minor league contract with the Washington Nationals organization. He split the year between the Triple-A Syracuse Chiefs and the Double-A Harrisburg Senators, slashing .269/.321/.366 with 6 home runs and 37 RBI. On November 7, 2015, he elected free agency.

=== Saraperos Saltillo ===
On February 19, 2016, Lisson signed with the Saraperos de Saltillo of the Mexican League. Lisson batted .278/.398/.474 in 111 games and was a mid-season all-star.

=== Washington Nationals (second stint) ===
On March 18, 2017, Lisson signed a minor league deal with the Washington Nationals. He split the year between Triple-A Syracuse and Double-A Harrisburg, slashing .191/.278/.348 between the two clubs. On November 6, Lisson elected free agency.

== Coaching career ==
Lisson was named manager of the Gulf Coast League Nationals, the rookie-level affiliate of the Washington Nationals, for the 2018 season. Lisson managed the club through the 2019 season. On December 19, 2019, Lisson was named the manager of the Single-A Hagerstown Suns. However, Lisson never managed the club due to the cancellation of the minor league season because of the COVID-19 pandemic. On December 15, 2020, the Nationals announced that Lisson would manage the Single-A Fredericksburg Nationals for the 2021 season. Lisson led the team to a 44–76 record in 2021 following an 0–15 start.

In January 2022, The Nationals named Lisson the manager of Single-A Wilmington Blue Rocks for the 2022 season. On December 19, 2024, Lisson was named as the development coach for the Triple-A Rochester Red Wings.
