= Elmer Guckert =

American baseball umpire (1929-2013)

Guckert

Umpire Elmer Bernard Guckert (January 15, 1929 – June 6, 2013) worked a single Major League Baseball game, which took place on May 21, 1976. When the regular umpires refused to cross a food service picket line that day, Guckert filled in, serving as the third base officiator. The game was between the Pittsburgh Pirates and the Chicago Cubs.

Guckert was born in Pittsburgh, Pennsylvania. He attended Oliver High School and then the University of Pittsburgh.
