= Sergio Pérez (baseball) =

Spanish baseball player (born 1984)

- Pitcher
- Born: 5 December 1984 (age 41); Tampa, Florida, U.S.
- Bats: Right Throws: Right
- Stats at Baseball Reference

Sergio Daniel Pérez (born 5 December 1984) is an American professional baseball pitcher. Born in the United States, he represents Spain internationally

== Career ==
Pérez is a graduate out of University of Tampa. In 2006, he was drafted by the Houston Astros in the 2nd round.

Pérez has played in the off-season with the Venezuelan Professional Baseball League for several seasons and has helped the Navegantes del Magallanes go into the playoffs.

On 16 March 2013, he signed a minor league contract with the Oakland Athletics.

On 4 March 2014, he signed a minor league contract with the Tampa Bay Rays.

== International career ==
Pérez played for the Spain national baseball team in the 2013 World Baseball Classic.
