= Doug Clark (baseball) =

American baseball player (born 1976)

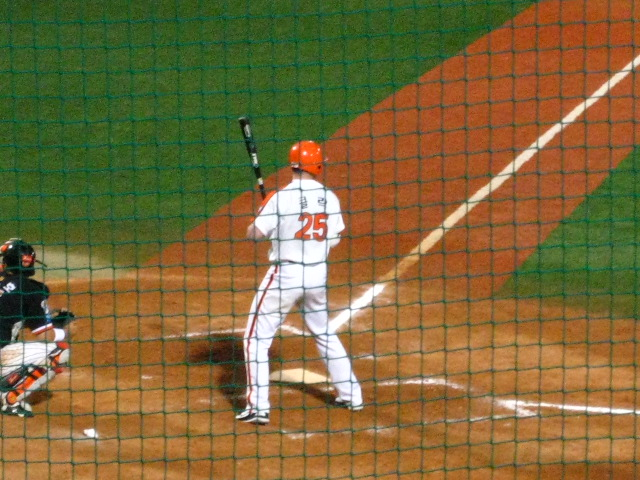
- Clark with the Hanwha Eagles in 2008
- Outfielder
- Born: March 5, 1976 (age 49); Springfield, Massachusetts
- Batted: Left Threw: Right

Professional debut
- MLB: September 14, 2005, for the San Francisco Giants
- KBO: 2008, for the Hanwha Eagles

Last appearance
- MLB: June 29, 2006, for the Oakland Athletics
- KBO: July, 2010, for the Nexen Heroes

MLB statistics
- Batting average: .091
- Home run: 0
- Runs batted in: 0

KBO statistics
- Batting average: .267
- Home run: 58
- Runs batted in: 219
- Stats at Baseball Reference

Teams
- San Francisco Giants (2005); Oakland Athletics (2006); Hanwha Eagles (2008); Nexen Heroes (2009–2010)

Douglas Dwyer Clark (born March 5, 1976) is an American professional baseball coach and former player. He played in Major League Baseball (MLB) for the San Francisco Giants and Oakland Athletics, and in the KBO League for the Hanwha Eagles and Nexen Heroes.

== Early career ==
Clark was a star high-school football, basketball and tennis player at Springfield Central High School in Springfield, Massachusetts. He attended the University of Massachusetts Amherst on a football scholarship as a wide receiver. He was a walk-on to the baseball team, and in three seasons posted a career batting average of .366 with 21 home runs, 137 runs batted in (RBIs), and 49 stolen bases. Clark was selected by the Milwaukee Brewers in the 20th round of the 1997 MLB draft following his sophomore season, but returned for his junior year. Following that season, he was selected in the 7th round of the 1998 MLB draft by the San Francisco Giants.

== Professional career ==
=== San Francisco Giants ===
Clark signed with the Giants in 1998 and was assigned to the Single-A Salem-Keizer Volcanoes of the Northwest League. He spent the majority of the 1999 season with the Single-A Bakersfield Blaze and had a successful stint with them, batting .326 with 11 home runs, 58 RBI and 17 stolen bases. He also played 15 games with the Double-A Shreveport Captains. Clark spent the entire 2000 and 2001 seasons in Shreveport. He enjoyed two fairly successful seasons, hitting .272 with 10 home runs and 75 RBI in 2000, and .275 with 6 home runs, 51 RBI and 20 stolen bases in 2001. In 2002, Clark started the season again with the Double-A Captains before being called up to the Triple-A Fresno Grizzlies. He also spent 2003 between Double-A and Triple-A, although with a new Double-A affiliate of the Giants, the Norwich Navigators. Clark played the entire 2004 season in Norwich, batting .292 with 4 home runs and 49 RBI.

Clark started the 2005 season with the Triple-A Grizzlies. He played in 127 games with the Grizzlies batting .316 with 13 home runs and 59 RBI. On September 14, 2005, Clark made his major league debut with the Giants. Clark appeared in eight games with San Francisco, mainly as a pinch hitter, pinch runner, or defensive replacement. He did not record a hit, but scored two runs.

=== Oakland Athletics ===
At the end of the season, Clark was granted free agency by the Giants and was signed by the Oakland A's. Clark started the 2006 season with the Triple-A Sacramento River Cats. He was called up to the major-league A's and made his first appearance with them on June 20, 2006. Clark appeared in six games as a pinch hitter and recorded his first major-league hit. He was then returned to Sacramento where he finished the season hitting .287 with 15 home runs and 67 RBI.

=== Atlanta Braves ===
At the end of the 2006 season, Clark was again granted free agency, and was signed by the Atlanta Braves. He attempted to make the major-league roster in spring training, and while he batted .429 during spring training he failed to secure a roster spot and was assigned to the Triple-A Richmond Braves. Clark played in 134 games with Richmond and hit .275 with 15 home runs and 69 RBI. At the end of the 2007 season, Clark was released by the Braves.

=== Hanwha Eagles ===
Prior to a game in Richmond during the 2007 season, Clark had been introduced to a Korean baseball scout who stated that he liked the way that Clark played. Prior to the 2008 season, Clark signed on with the Hanwha Eagles of the KBO League. That season in Korea, Clark hit 23 home runs with 80 RBI and 23 stolen bases, and was named an all-star. However, a midseason knee injury caused his average to drop from .315 to .250.

=== Nexen Heroes ===
In 2009, Clark signed and played with the Nexen Heroes within the KBO League, hitting .290 with 24 home runs and 90 RBI. He started the 2010 season with the Heroes, hitting .265 with 12 homers and 50 RBI, but was released from the team in July.

=== Mexican baseball ===
After leaving the Korean league, Clark was signed by the Mexican League team Tigres de Quintana Roo for the 2011 season. He compiled a .315 batting average, .424 on-base percentage, and .579 slugging percentage, and by the end of the season was the team's starting left fielder. The team won the league championship in 2011. Clark returned to the Tigres in 2012 and 2013, batting .328 and .319 during those seasons, respectively. During the 2014 season, Clark played 30 games with Broncos de Reynosa where he batted .272, and 25 games with Diablos Rojos del México where he had a .306 average.

Clark also played multiple seasons of winter baseball in the Mexican Pacific League, first in 2005–06 with Mayos de Navojoa and finally in 2014–15 with Venados de Mazatlán, his final professional team.

== Coaching career ==
Clark coached for seven years in the San Francisco Giants organization, reaching the Double-A level as hitting coach for the Richmond Flying Squirrels. For the 2022 season, Clark moved to the Boston Red Sox organization, and was named hitting coach for the Double-A Portland Sea Dogs. In 2024 Clark was promoted to the AAA affiliate, Worcester Red Sox.
